= Subhash =

Subhash may refer to:

== People ==
- Subhash Agarwal, Indian professional player and coach of English billiards and snooker
- Subhash Awchat (born 1960), Indian artist and author based in Mumbai
- Subhash Bapurao Wankhede (born 1963), Indian politician and a member of the Shiv Sena (SS) political party. He is a member of the 15th Lok Sabha of India and represents the Hingoli constituency in Maharashtra state
- Subhash Bhaskar Nair (1964–2004), was a gangster and hitman, who was shot dead by the Gujarat police during an encounter in Valsad in June 2004
- Subhas Chandra Bose (1897–1945), one of the most prominent Indian nationalist leaders who attempted to liberate India from British rule during the waning years of World War II
- Subhas Chakraborty (1942–2009), popular leader in the Communist Party of India (Marxist) and Transport, Sports and Youth Services Minister in the Government of West Bengal
- Subhas Sumbhu Chakrobarty (born 1985), Indian football player. He is currently playing for United Sports Club in the I-League in India as a Midfielder
- Subhas Anandan (1947–2015), prominent criminal lawyer in Singapore
- Subhas Brigade, a unit of the Indian National Army (INA)
- Subhash Mukhopadhyay (disambiguation)
  - Subhash Mukhopadhyay (poet) (1919–2003), Indian Bengali poet
  - Subhash Mukhopadhyay (physician) (1931–1981), Indian gynecologist
- Subhash Bhatt (born 1945), Indian cricketer who played for Gujarat. He was born in Ahmedabad
- Subhash Bhende (died 2010), Marathi writer from Goa, India. He died in December, 2010
- Subhash Bhowmick, nicknamed Bhombal, born at West Bengal is a retired Indian football international player and club level coach and manager
- Subhash Chandra (born 1950), onetime rice exporter-turned media baron and Chairman of Essel Group, that launched India's satellite television revolution
- Subhash Chandran (born 1972), Malayalam author who has won the Confederation of Tamil Nadu Malayali Associations (CTMA) literary prize for outstanding young writers
- Subhash Sureshchandra Deshmukh (born 1957), member of the 14th Lok Sabha of India. He represents the solapur constituency of Maharashtra and is a member of the Bharatiya Janata Party
- Subhash Ghai (born 1945), Indian film director, producer and screenwriter
- Subhash Ghisingh (born 1936), leader of Gorkhaland National Liberation Front (GNLF) which he founded in 1980. He was the chairman of the Darjeeling Gorkha Hill Council in West Bengal, India from 1988 to 2008. He spearheaded the Gorkhaland movement in the 1980s
- Subhash Gupte (1929–2002), pronunciation (help·info) (11 December 1929 in Bombay, India – 31 May 2002, Port of Spain, Trinidad and Tobago) was one of Test cricket's finest spin bowlers
- Subhash Kak (born 1947), Indian American computer scientist, most notable for his controversial Indological publications on history, the philosophy of science, ancient astronomy, and the history of mathematics
- Subhash Khot, Associate Professor at New York University. He is best known for his Unique games conjecture
- Subhash Maharia (born 1957), former union minister of state, rural development in Government of India. He was minister from 1999 to 2004. He is a leader of Bharatiya Janta Party and was a member of 12th, 13th and 14th Lok Sabha from Sikar in Rajasthan
- Subhash Modi (born 1946), Kenyan umpire. Modi has served as the Kenya Cricket Umpires and Scorers Association as chairman, secretary and treasurer, the organisation awarded him life membership for his services. He also played for Kenya in 1969
- Subhash Bhaskar Nair (1964–2004), was a gangster and hitman, who was shot dead by the Gujarat police during an encounter in Valsad in June 2004
- Subhash Saini, senior computer scientist at NASA Ames Research Center
- Subhash C Kashyap (born 1929), born 10 May 1929) is a former Secretary-General of 7th Lok Sabha, 8th Lok Sabha and 9th Lok Sabha and Lok Sabha Secretariat (Lower House of Parliament of India) from 1984 to 1990
- Subhash Suri (born 1960), Indian-American computer scientist, a professor at the University of California, Santa Barbara. He is known for his research in computational geometry, computer networks, and algorithmic game theory
- Subhash Prasad Yadav, politician of the Rashtriya Janata Dal party and is presently a Member of the Parliament of India representing Bihar in the Rajya Sabha, the upper house of the Indian Parliament
- Subhash Zanak, present MLA from Risod Constituency and Ex-Cabinet Minister of Women and Child Development in the Government of Maharashtra in India
- Subhash Singh (born 1990), Indian football player
- Subhash Dutta (1930–2012), Bangladeshi filmmaker
- Subhash Kapoor, Indian film director, producer and screenwriter
- Subhash Bhojwani, a retired Indian Air Force Air Marshal
- Subhas Mungra, a Surinamese diplomat and former Foreign Minister
- Subhas Panday, Trinidad and Tobago politician

== Places ==
- Subhash Bridge, Ahmedabad, India
- Subhash Vihar, Delhi, India
- Subhash Nagar metro station (disambiguation)

== See also ==
- Subash (disambiguation)
- Netaji (disambiguation)
