= List of Kolkata Metro stations =

List of all operational, under-construction and planned stations of Kolkata Metro

This is the list of the stations of Kolkata Metro, a mass rapid transit urban railway network serving the city of Kolkata, India. It was the first underground railway built in India. The first operations commenced in October 1984, and the full stretch that was initially planned was operational by February 1995.

As of 22 August 2025, there are 58 metro stations with five operational lines, the Blue Line (with 26 stations), Green Line (with 12 stations), Purple Line (with 7 stations), Yellow Line (with 4 stations) and Orange Line (with 9 stations).

== Metro stations ==
=== Operational ===
Station name		Station code	Photo	Line	Opened	Layout	Platform type	Notes	Coordinates	Ref.
English	Bengali	Station code	Photo	Line	Opened	Layout	Platform type	Notes	Coordinates	Ref.
Kavi Subhash	কবি সুভাষ	KKSO		Blue Line; Orange Line	7 October 2010; 6 March 2024	At grade	1 island and 4 side	Also known as New Garia, named after Bengali poet Subash Mukherjee.	22°28′19″N 88°23′53″E	
Shahid Khudiram	শহীদ ক্ষুদিরাম	KSKD		Blue Line	7 October 2010	Elevated	Side	Also known as Briji/Dhalai Bridge, named after Shahid Khudiram Bose.	22°27′57.5″N 88°23′30″E	
Kavi Nazrul	কবি নজরুল	KKNZ		Blue Line	22 August 2009	Elevated	Side	Also known as Garia Bazar, named after the Indian poet Kazi Nazrul Islam	22°46′42″N 88°38′04″E	
Gitanjali	গীতাঞ্জলি	KGTN		Blue Line	22 August 2009	Elevated	Side	Also known as Naktala, named after Rabindranath Tagore's Noble winning poetry collection Gitanjali.	22°47′00″N 88°37′00″E	
Masterda Surya Sen	মাস্টারদা সূর্য সেন	KMSN		Blue Line	22 August 2009	Elevated	Side	Also known as Bansdroni, named after Freedom Fighter of India, Surya Sen.	22.473521°N 88.360871°E	
Netaji	নেতাজি	KNTJ		Blue Line	22 August 2009	Elevated	Side	Also known as Kudghat, named after Bengali freedom fighter Netaji Subhash Chandra Bose	22.480976°N 88.346000°E	
Mahanayak Uttam Kumar	মহানায়ক উত্তম কুমার	KMUK		Blue Line	29 April 1986	At grade	1 island and 1 side	Also known as Tollygunge, named after the Bengali actor Uttam Kumar.	22°29′41″N 88°20′42″E	
Rabindra Sarobar	রবীন্দ্র সরোবর	KRSB		Blue Line	29 April 1986	Underground	Island	Also known as Charu Market and Dhakuria.	22°30′26″N 88°20′44″E	
Kalighat	কালীঘাট	KKHG		Blue Line	29 April 1986	Underground	Island	Also known as Rashbehari Basu, named after the Indian goddess Maa Kali.	22.516652°N 88.346003°E	
Jatin Das Park	যতীন দাস পার্ক	KJPK		Blue Line	29 April 1986	Underground	Island	Also known as Hazra, named after the Bengali freedom fighter Jatin Das.	22.524262°N 88.346489°E	
Netaji Bhavan	নেতাজি ভবন	KNBN		Blue Line	24 October 1984	Underground	Island	Also known as Bhawanipore, meaning Netaji's house in Bengali.	22°32′00″N 88°20′46″E	
Rabindra Sadan	রবীন্দ্র সদন	KRSD		Blue Line	24 October 1984	Underground	Island	Also known as Exide	22°32′29″N 88°20′50″E	
Maidan	ময়দান	KMDI		Blue Line	24 October 1984	Underground	Island	Also known as Gostho Pal	22°32′58″N 88°20′56″E	
Park Street	পার্ক স্ট্রীট	KPSK		Blue Line	24 October 1984	Underground and Double Track	Side	Also known as Mother Teresa	22°33′18″N 88°21′01″E	
Esplanade	এসপ্ল্যানেড	KESP		Blue Line; Green Line	24 October 1984; 6 March 2024	Underground	2 island and 2 side	It is the Kolkata Metro's largest station. Also known as Dharmatala	22°33′52″N 88°21′06″E	
Chandni Chowk	চাঁদনি চক	KCWC		Blue Line	15 February 1995	Underground	Island	Also known as Ganesh Chandra Avenue	22.566796°N 88.354137°E	
Central	সেন্ট্রাল	KCEN		Blue Line	15 February 1995	Underground	Island	Also known as Bepin Behari Ganguly Street	22.572470°N 88.358788°E	
Mahatma Gandhi Road	মহাত্মা গান্ধী রোড	KMHR		Blue Line	27 September 1995	Underground	Island	Also known as Mahajati Sadan and Chittaranjan Avenue	22.580858°N 88.361401°E	
Girish Park	গিরীশ পার্ক	KGPK		Blue Line	15 February 1995	Underground	Island	Also known as Jorasanko, the birthplace of Rabindranath Tagore	22.587143°N 88.363083°E	
Shobhabazar Sutanuti	শোভাবাজার সুতানুটি	KSHO		Blue Line	15 February 1995	Underground	Island	Also known as Hatkhola	22.596029°N 88.365285°E	
Shyambazar	শ্যামবাজার	KSHY		Blue Line	15 February 1995	Underground	Island	None	22.601313°N 88.372586°E	
Belgachhia	বেলগাছিয়া	KBEL		Blue Line	12 November 1984	Underground	Island	None	22°36′21″N 88°23′11″E	
Dum Dum	দমদম	KDMI		Blue Line	12 November 1984	Elevated	Side	Connection to Eastern Railway at Dum Dum Junction railway station	22°37′16″N 88°23′34″E	
Noapara	নোয়াপাড়া	KNAP		Blue Line; Yellow Line	10 July 2013; 22 August 2025	Elevated	2 side and 1 island	Also known as Maa Sarada	22°38′23″N 88°23′38″E	
Baranagar	বরাহনগর	KBAR		Blue Line	22 February 2021	Elevated	Side	Also known as Swami Vivekananda Baranagar Road railway station	22.653529°N 88.378873°E	
Dakshineswar	দক্ষিণেশ্বর	KDSW		Blue Line	22 February 2021	Elevated	Side	Also known as Sri Ramakrishna ; connected to Dakshineswar railway station	22.653971°N 88.363724°E	
Salt Lake Sector-V	সল্টলেক সেক্টর V	SVSA		Green Line; Orange Line	13 February 2020	Elevated	Side	Largest station on Green Line	22.581318°N 88.429822°E	
Karunamoyee	করুণাময়ী	KESA		Green Line	13 February 2020	Elevated	Side	First station in Kolkata to have Platform Screen Door	22.586435°N 88.421515°E	
Central Park	সেন্ট্রাল পার্ক	CPSA		Green Line	13 February 2020	Elevated	Side	None	22.590437°N 88.415605°E	
City Center	সিটি সেন্টার	CCSC		Green Line	13 February 2020	Elevated	Side	Caters to CC1	22.587069°N 88.407875°E	
Bengal Chemical	বেঙ্গল কেমিক্যাল	BCSD		Green Line	13 February 2020	Elevated	Side	Also known as Acharya Prafulla Chandra Ray, Mani Square	22.580076°N 88.401283°E	
Salt Lake Stadium	সল্টলেক স্টেডিয়াম	SSSA		Green Line	13 February 2020	Elevated	Side	Salt Lake Stadium	22°34′23″N 88°24′11″E	
Phoolbagan	ফুলবাগান	PBGB		Green Line	4 October 2020	Underground	Island	None	22.572140°N 88.390282°E	
Sealdah	শিয়ালদহ	SDHM		Green Line	11 July 2022	Underground	1 island and 2 side	Connected with Sealdah railway station. Interchange with local, suburban and national rail services.	22.567207°N 88.371497°E	
Mahakaran	মহাকরণ	MKNA		Green Line	6 March 2024	Underground	Island	For B. B. D. Bagh, Writers' Building, and Lalbazar, also headquarters of Kolkata Police	22.571189°N 88.350106°E	
Howrah	হাওড়া	HWHM		Green Line	6 March 2024	Underground	1 island and 2 side	Deepest station in India, Interchange with local suburban and national rail services at Howrah railway station	22.584454°N 88.340578°E	
Howrah Maidan	হাওড়া ময়দান	HWMM		Green Line	6 March 2024	Underground	1 island	Serving Howrah Municipal Corporation Stadium	22.581998°N 88.332994°E	
Joka	জোকা	KJKA		Purple Line	30 December 2022	Elevated	Side	Also known as Diamond Park	22.452244°N 88.301751°E	
Thakurpukur	ঠাকুরপুকুর	KTKP		Purple Line	30 December 2022	Elevated	Side	None	22.464261°N 88.307555°E	
Behala Sakherbazar	সখেরবাজার	KSKB		Purple Line	30 December 2022	Elevated	Side	Also known as Silpara	22.474611°N 88.309991°E	
Behala Chowrasta	বেহালা চৌরাস্তা	KBCR		Purple Line	30 December 2022	Elevated	Side	None	22.487529°N 88.313426°E	
Behala Bazar	বেহালা বাজার	KBBR		Purple Line	30 December 2022	Elevated	Side	None	22.498929°N 88.317354°E	
Taratala	তারাতলা	KTRT		Purple Line	30 December 2022	Elevated	Side	Also known as Pathakpara	22.508165°N 88.320563°E	
Majerhat	মাঝেরহাট	KMJH		Purple Line	6 March 2024	Elevated	Side	None	22.5191°N 88.3234°E	
Satyajit Ray	সত্যজিৎ রায়	KSJR		Orange Line	6 March 2024	Elevated	Side	Also known as Chak Garia / Ajoy Nagar, named after Bengali movie director Satyajit Ray.	22.4846°N 88.3926°E	
Jyotirindra Nandi	জ্যোতিরিন্দ্র নন্দী	KJNN		Orange Line	6 March 2024	Elevated	Side	Also known as Singhbari, named after the Bengali author Jyotirindra Nath Nandi.	22.495915°N 88.398667°E	
Kavi Sukanta	কবি সুকান্ত	KKSK		Orange Line	6 March 2024	Elevated	Side	Also known as Avishikta More, named after the Bengali teenage poet Sukanta Bhattacharya.	22.505262°N 88.400996°E	
Hemanta Mukhopadhyay	হেমন্ত মুখোপাধ্যায়	KHMD		Orange Line	6 March 2024	Elevated	Side	Also known as Ruby More, named after the Bengali playback singer Hemanta Mukherjee.	22.514777°N 88.401469°E	
VIP Bazar	ভিআইপি বাজার	KVIB		Orange Line	22 August 2025	Elevated	Side	None	22.525500°N 88.395860°E	
Ritwik Ghatak	ঋত্বিক ঘটক	KRWG		Orange Line	22 August 2025	Elevated	Side	Also known as Bantala Road/Uttar Panchanagram, named after the Bengali movie director Ritwik Ghatak.	22.5328605°N 88.3957647°E	
Barun Sengupta	বরুণ সেনগুপ্ত	KBST		Orange Line	22 August 2025	Elevated	Side	Also known as Metropolitan/Science City/Dhapa/Mathpukur, named after the Bengali journalist Barun Sengupta.	22.543986°N 88.339274°E	
Beleghata	বেলেঘাটা	KBGA		Orange Line	22 August 2025	Elevated	Side	Also known as Tangra Metropolitan Township	22.550703°N 88.404094°E	
Dum Dum Cantonment	দমদম ক্যান্টনমেন্ট	KDCM		Yellow Line	22 August 2025	Elevated	Side	Connected to Dum Dum Cantonment railway station of Bangaon Line of Sealdah division	22.6380°N 88.4123°E	
Jessore Road	যশোহর রোড	KJRO		Yellow Line	22 August 2025	At grade	Side	None	22.6395137°N 88.4297765°E	
Jai Hind	জয় হিন্দ	KJHD		Yellow Line	22 August 2025	Underground	Side & Island	Also known as Biman Bandar, named after Netaji Subhash Chandra Bose's slogan Jai Hind. For Netaji Subhas Chandra Bose International Airport	22.64619°N 88.43591°E	

=== Under construction ===
Kolkata Metro is undergoing a significant expansion, with an additional line (Pink Line) in the planning stages. There is ongoing work on three existing lines (Purple Line, Yellow Line and Orange Line) to complete their planned length. Once all construction phases are finished, the Kolkata Metro network will gain 48 additional stations, currently 19 stations are under construction and 29 stations are in the planning stage. Here is the list of all planned and under construction stations along with their respective lines.

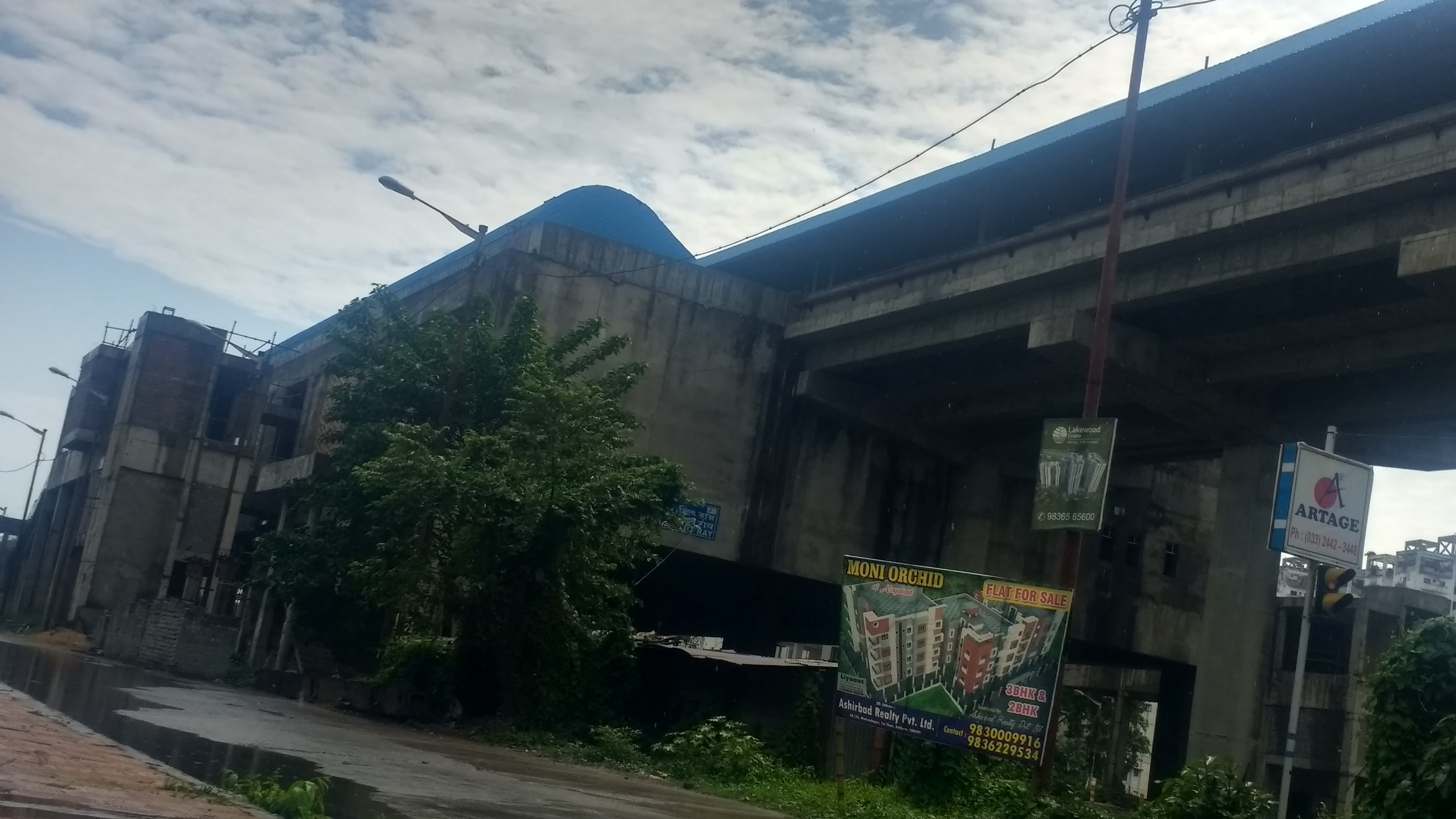
Satyajit Ray metro station

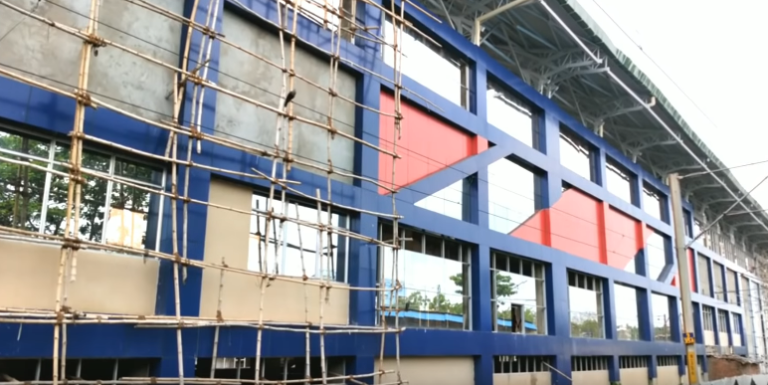
Dum Dum Cantonment metro station

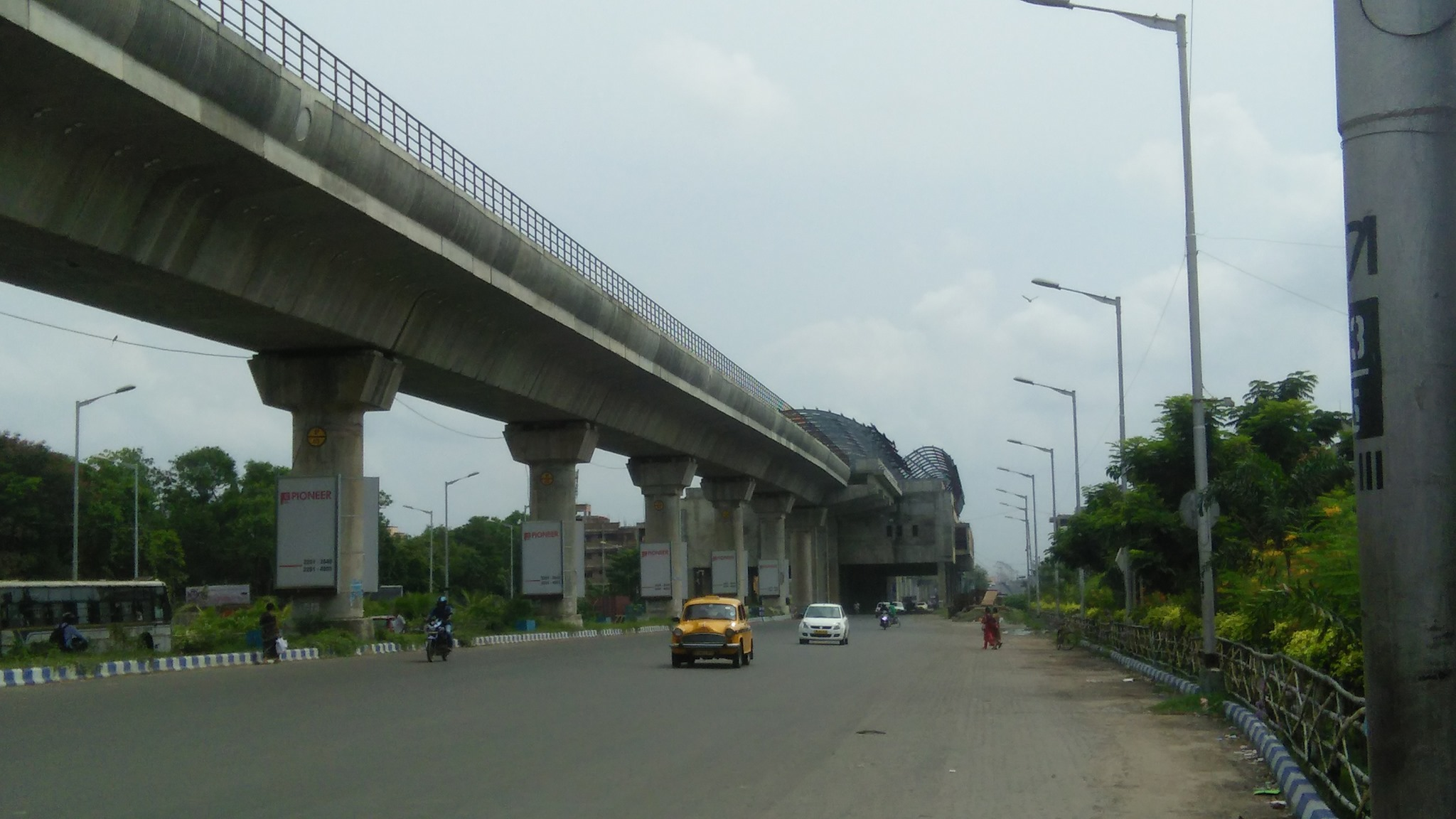
Metro flyover near Satyajit Ray metro station

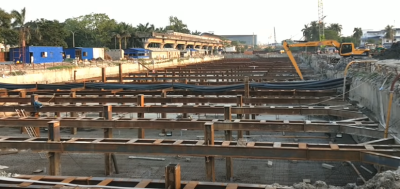
Construction of Airport metro station

==== Green Line ====
From Howrah Maidan to Teghoria via Dharmatala and Salt Lake

#	Name of the planned station		Location	Distance from Howrah Maidan (in km)	Status	Deadline
#	English	Bengali	Location	Distance from Howrah Maidan (in km)	Status	Deadline
1	Teghoria	তেঘরিয়া	Teghoria	16.7	Approved	–
2	Raghunathpur	রঘুনাথপুর	Baguiati	14.2	Approved	–
3	Baguiati	বাগুইআটি	Baguiati	13.6	Approved	–
4	Kestopur	কেষ্টপুর	Dum Dum Park and Kestopur	12.2	Approved	–
5	Krishnapur	কৃষ্ণপুর	Kestopur	14.6	Approved	–

As of 2018, extension of the west side of Kolkata Metro Green Line has been proposed up to Santragachi and to be sanctioned by the Railway Ministry of the Government of India.

==== Purple Line ====
From IIM-Joka to Eden Gardens via Behala, Kidderpore, Maidan and Esplanade

Main Line
#	Name of proposed station		Location	Distance from Joka (in km)	Status	Deadline
#	English	Bengali	Location	Distance from Joka (in km)	Status	Deadline
1	Eden Gardens	ইডেন গার্ডেনস	Babughat	15.815	Approved	–
2	Esplanade	এসপ্ল্যানেড	Esplanade	14.215		2030
3	Park Street	পার্ক স্ট্রীট	Park St.	13.29		2030
4	Victoria	ভিক্টোরিয়া	Maidan	12.025		2030
5	Khidirpur	খিদিরপুর	Kidderpore	9.87		2030
6	Mominpur	মোমিনপুর	Mominpore	8.755		2030
7	IIM Calcutta	আই আই এম জোকা	IIM Calcutta	1.7	Tender floated	–

From IIM-Joka to Diamond Park via Joka Charial canal.

Branch Line
#	Name of proposed station		Location	Distance from IIM-Joka (in km)	Status	Deadline
#	English	Bengali	Location	Distance from IIM-Joka (in km)	Status	Deadline
1	IIM Calcutta	আই আই এম জোকা	IIM Calcutta	0.00	Tender floated	–
2	Diamond Park	ডায়মন্ড পার্ক	Diamond Park	1.69	Land acquisition ongoing	–

On 25 March 2025, The Times of India reported that Metro Railway had sent a proposal to the Ministry of Railways to extend this branch line from Diamond Park to Tollygunge, which will be 8.5 km (5.3 mi) long. This route will run under Mahatma Gandhi Road, and three underground stations at Thakurpukur Cancer Hospital, Ramchandrapur and Panchanantala will come.

==== Yellow Line ====
From Noapara to Barasat via Kolkata Airport

#	Name of proposed station		Location	Distance from Noapara (in km)	Status	Deadline
#	English	Bengali	Location	Distance from Noapara (in km)	Status	Deadline
1	Birati	বিরাটি	Birati	7.810	Under Construction	2030
2	Michael Nagar	মাইকেল নগর	Michael Nagar	9.000	Under Construction	2030
3	New Barrackpur	নিউ ব্যারাকপুর	New Barrackpore	10.250	Planned	–
4	Madhyamgram	মধ্যমগ্রাম	Madhyamgram	12.310	Planned	–
5	Hridaypur	হৃদয়পুর	Hridaypur	14.930	Planned	–
6	Barasat	বারাসাত	Barasat	16.876	Planned	–

==== Pink Line ====
From Baranagar to Barrackpore via Barrackpore Trunk Road Also proposal for extension to Kalyani to cater AIIMS Kalyani, MAKAUT and IISER Kolkata.

#	Name of proposed station		Location	Distance from Baranagar (in km)	Status	Deadline
#	English	Bengali	Location	Distance from Baranagar (in km)	Status	Deadline
1	Baranagar	বরাহনগর	Baranagar	0.00	Proposed	–
2	Krishna Kali	কৃষ্ণ কলি	Kamarhati	1.20	Proposed	–
3	Acharya Prafulla Chandra	আচার্য প্রফুল্ল চন্দ্র	Agarpara	2.80	Proposed	–
4	Gandhi Ashram	গান্ধী আশ্রম	Panihati	4.20	Proposed	–
5	Sarat Chandra	শরৎ চন্দ্র	Sodepur	5.40	Proposed	–
6	Subhas Nagar	সুভাষ নগর	Sukchar	6.50	Proposed	–
7	Rishi Bankim	ঋষি বঙ্কিম	Khardaha	7.90	Proposed	–
8	Dr. Rajendra Prasad	ডঃ রাজেন্দ্র প্রসাদ	Titagarh Power Plant	8.80	Proposed	–
9	Shah Nawaz Khan	শাহ নওয়াজ খান	Titagarh	10.10	Proposed	–
10	Anukul Thakur	অনুকূল ঠাকুর	Talpukur	11.40	Proposed	–
11	Mangal Pandey	মঙ্গল পাণ্ডে	Barrackpore	12.40	Proposed	–

==== Orange Line ====
From New Garia to Kolkata Airport via Salt Lake and New Town.

#	Name of proposed station		Location	Distance from Kavi Subhash (in km)	Status	Deadline
#	English	Bengali	Location	Distance from Kavi Subhash (in km)	Status	Deadline
1	Gour Kishore Ghosh	গৌর কিশোর ঘোষ	Sukant Nagar	11.1	Under construction	2031
2	Nalban	নলবন	Nicco Park	12.57	Under construction	2031
3	IT Centre	আই টি সেন্টার	Sector-V: CM Block, also conncection to Salt Lake Sector-V metro station	14.02	Under construction	2031
4	Nabadiganta	নবদিগন্ত	Technopolis Signal	15.15	Under construction	2031
5	Nazrul Tirtha	নজরুল তীর্থ	New Town Bus Stand	16.22	Under construction	2031
6	Swapnabhor	স্বপ্নভোর	Axis Mall	17.55	Under construction	2031
7	Biswa Bangla Convention Centre	বিশ্ব বাংলা কনভেনশন সেন্টার	Biswa Bangla Convention Centre	18.69	Under construction	2031
8	Shiksha Tirtha	শিক্ষা তীর্থ	Fintech Hub	20.07	Under construction	2031
9	Mother's Wax Museum	মাদার্স ওয়াক্স মিউজিয়াম	Eco Park: Gate 2	20.91	Under construction	2031
10	Eco Park	ইকো পার্ক	Eco Park: Gate 4	22.17	Under construction	2031
11	Mangaldeep	মঙ্গলদীপ	Automobile Hub	23.37	Under construction	2031
12	City Centre-2	সিটি সেন্টার ২	City Centre-II	24.25	Under construction	2031
13	Chinar Park	চিনার পার্ক	Chinar Park	26.34	Under construction	2031
14	VIP Road	ভি আই পি রোড	Haldirams Signal	27.88	Under construction	2031
15	Jai Hind	জয় হিন্দ	Kolkata Airport	29.87	Under construction	2031

== See also ==
- List of Ahmedabad Metro stations
- List of Chennai Metro stations
- List of Coimbatore Metro stations
- List of Delhi Metro stations
- List of Hyderabad Metro stations
- List of Jaipur Metro stations
- List of Kochi Metro stations
- List of Lucknow Metro stations
- List of Madurai Metro stations
- List of Mumbai Metro stations
- List of Noida Metro stations
- List of Nagpur Metro stations
- List of Namma Metro stations
- List of Navi Mumbai Metro Stations
- List of Pune Metro stations
- List of Surat Metro stations
