= Subha =

Subha may refer to:

- Subah, subdivision of the Moghul Empire territories
- Misbaha, Muslim prayer beads, also known as subha

== People ==
- Subha (writers), Indian detective novelists
- Subha Devakul, Thai writer
- Subha Ghosh, Indian footballer
- Subha Jay, Malaysian-Indian businesswoman and actress
- Subha Nagalakshmi Munchetty-Chendriah or Naga Munchetty, British-Indian journalist and television presenter
- Subha Srinivasan, Indian cricketer
- Subha Tulfah al-Mussallat, mother of former President of Iraq Saddam Hussain
- Subha Varier, Indian space engineer
- Subha Venkatesan, Indian sprinter
- Subha Rajput Indian actress and model

== Film and television ==
- Subha Lagnam, 1994 Indian film
- Subha Sankalpam, 1995 Indian film by K. Viswanath
- Subha Sankalpam (TV series), 2019 Indian soap opera

== See also ==
- Subah (disambiguation)
- Shubha (disambiguation)
- Suba (disambiguation)
- Subhash (disambiguation)
- Subash (disambiguation)
