= Baranagar (disambiguation) =

Baranagar is a city in West Bengal, India, formerly called Barahanagore.

Baranagar may also refer to:

== Places ==
- Baranagar, is a city of the Indian state of West Bengal, established in 1869
- Bulandshahr, India, earlier known as Baranagar
- Baranagar Municipality, a municipality (civic administration body) of city Baranagar, established in 1869
- Baranagar, Murshidabad, a temple village in West Bengal, India

=== Constituencies ===
- Baranagar (Vidhan Sabha constituency)

== Schools ==
- Baranagore Ramakrishna Mission Ashrama High School, a senior secondary boys' school

== Transport ==
- Baranagar Road railway station, a railway station
- Baranagar metro station, a metro railway station

== Other uses ==
- Baranagar Math, first monastery of Ramakrishna Order
