= Barrackpore Trunk Road =

Road in Kolkata, India

- BT Road
- Barrackpore Trunk Road highlighted in red
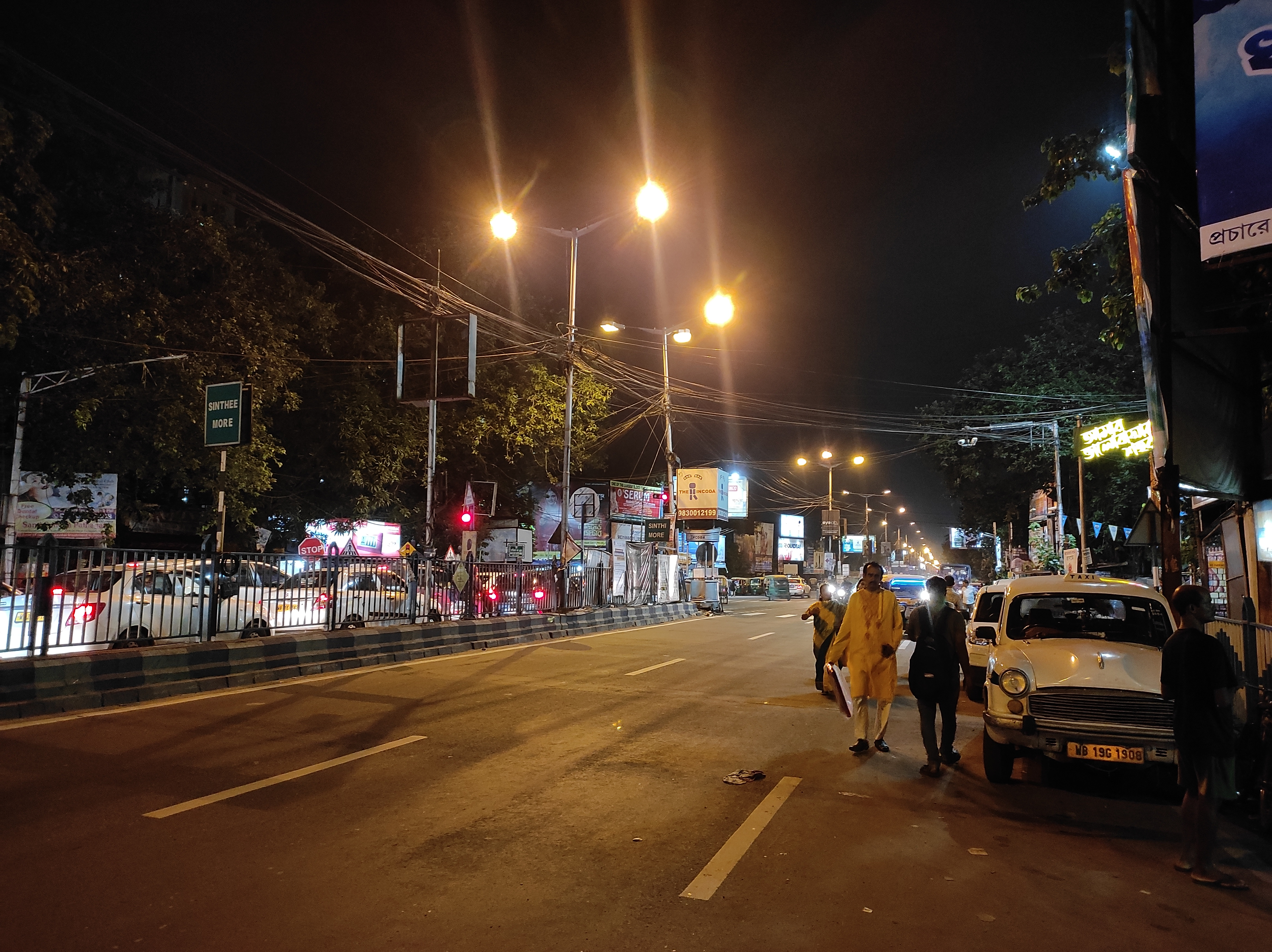
- BT Road, Sinthee

Route information
- Length: 18.1 km (11.2 mi)
- Existed: 1775–present

Location
- Country: India
- States: West Bengal
- Districts: Kolkata and North 24 Parganas
- Municipalities: Barrackpore Municipality, Titagarh Municipality, Khardaha Municipality, Panihati Municipality, Kamarhati Municipality, Baranagar Municipality, Kolkata Municipal Corporation

Highway system
- Roads in India; Expressways; National; State; Asian

Barrackpore Trunk Road, commonly known as BT Road, is 6 laned trunk road in Kolkata West Bengal, India. It connects Shaymbazar with Barrackpore via Baranagar. Built in 1775, it is the oldest metalled road and one of the busiest roads in the country. The 18.1 km (11.2 mi) long road is a part of both State Highway 1 and State Highway 2.

Barrackpore Trunk Road has multiple institutes and other landmarks along it, including the Indian Statistical Institute and Rabindra Bharati University. Once the areas around the road were industrial zones, but gradually, residential areas sprawled and replaced the industries. The city's 160-year-old water supply pipeline runs under the road. An elevated metro line was planned in 2010–2011 over the road from Baranagar to Barrackpore. BT Road has a major intersection at Dunlop.

== Route description ==
The 18.1-kilometre (11.2-mile) trunk road starts from the Shyambazar 5-point crossing in North Kolkata, goes straight northward and ends at Barrackpore. It serves Tala, Paikpara, Sinthee, Cossipore, Baranagar, Dunlop, Belghoria, Kamarhati, Agarpara, Panihati, Sodepur, Sukchar, Khardaha, Titagarh, Barrackpore areas under the municipalities of Barrackpore, Titagarh, Khardaha, Panihati, Kamarhati, Baranagar and Kolkata Municipal Corporation. The West Bengal State Highway 1 and State Highway 2 runs through BT Road. It is a six-lane road of 21 m (69 ft) width except some areas where it is 4 laned. The traffic volume on the trunk road fewer than 7,000 passenger car units a day in the late 1990s, which had increased to 12,000 passenger car units a day in 2010. A six-lane flyover is planned between Tallah Bridge and Dunlop to decongest the BT Road.

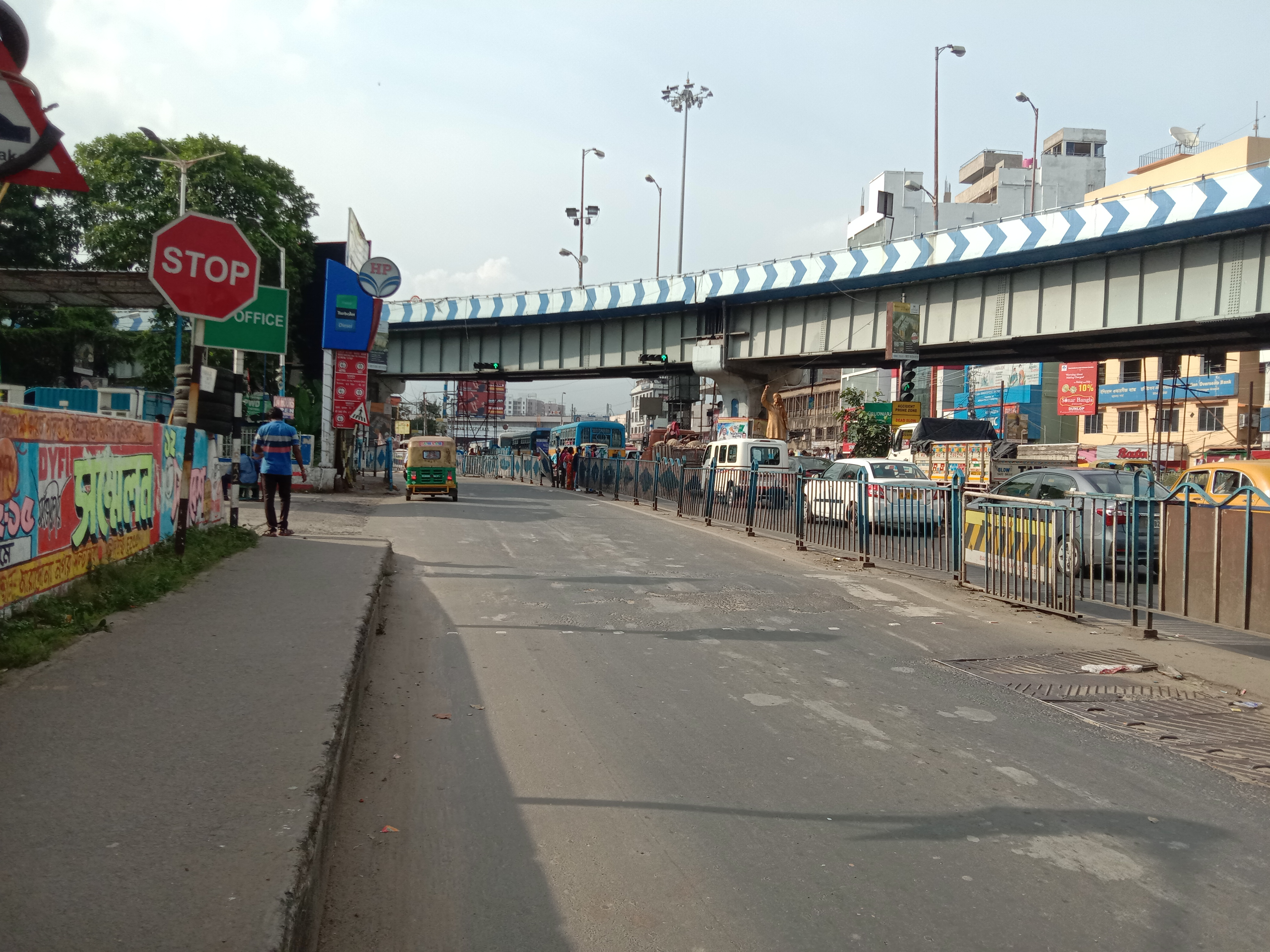
Barrackpore Trunk Road at Dunlop More

Dunlop More is a T-shaped major intersection in the route. There, it passes under the Belghoria Expressway (AH1). The branched out road from BT Road at Dunlop joins the Belghoria Expressway, which further connects with National Highways 16 and 19 on the other side of Hooghly River. It also has a one-way flyover from the branched road, which joins BT Road on the Shyambazar-facing lane. Barrackpore Trunk Road passes under Kolkata Metro Blue Line and Chord Link Line (Kolkata Suburban Railway) and has an interchange facility with Baranagar metro station and Baranagar Road railway station respectively, at Dunlop.

== History ==
Barrackpore was the first British cantonment in India, set up in 1772. To connect it with the then country capital, Calcutta, the trunk road was built in 1775; it was the first metalled road in India and is also one of the busiest roads in the country.

Later the areas including Khardah, Sodepur and Titagarh, along BT Road grew into industrial zones. Some of the notable mills included Mohini Mills in Belghoria, Basanti Cotton Mills in Khardah Jute Mill/ But during the late 1970–80s, deindustrialization began under the then Chief Minister Jyoti Basu's tenure in the state. This led to a shift from heavy industries to small and cottage industries, with many of the industrial developments on the road closing. Gradually, property developers took up the vacant lands and built housing infrastructure along the road. The announcement of metro projects also increased the demand of residential properties.

== Landmarks ==
=== Institutes ===
Some major institutes and campuses including Indian Statistical Institute, a Statistical Laboratory set up by Prasanta Chandra Mahalanobis in Kolkata; Rabindra Bharati University, a public research university; College of Medicine & Sagore Dutta Hospital, a referral government hospital, medical college and research institute; University of Calcutta BT Road Campus, a collegiate public state research university; are situated on Barrackpore Trunk Road.

=== Other landmarks ===
Other notable landmarks along the route include the Bengal Chemicals and Pharmaceuticals, Panihati factory; NCERT Production-cum-Distribution Centre, Panihati; Texmaco Rail & Engineering Limited, Belgharia; and CESC Titagarh generating station.

== Kolkata Metro ==
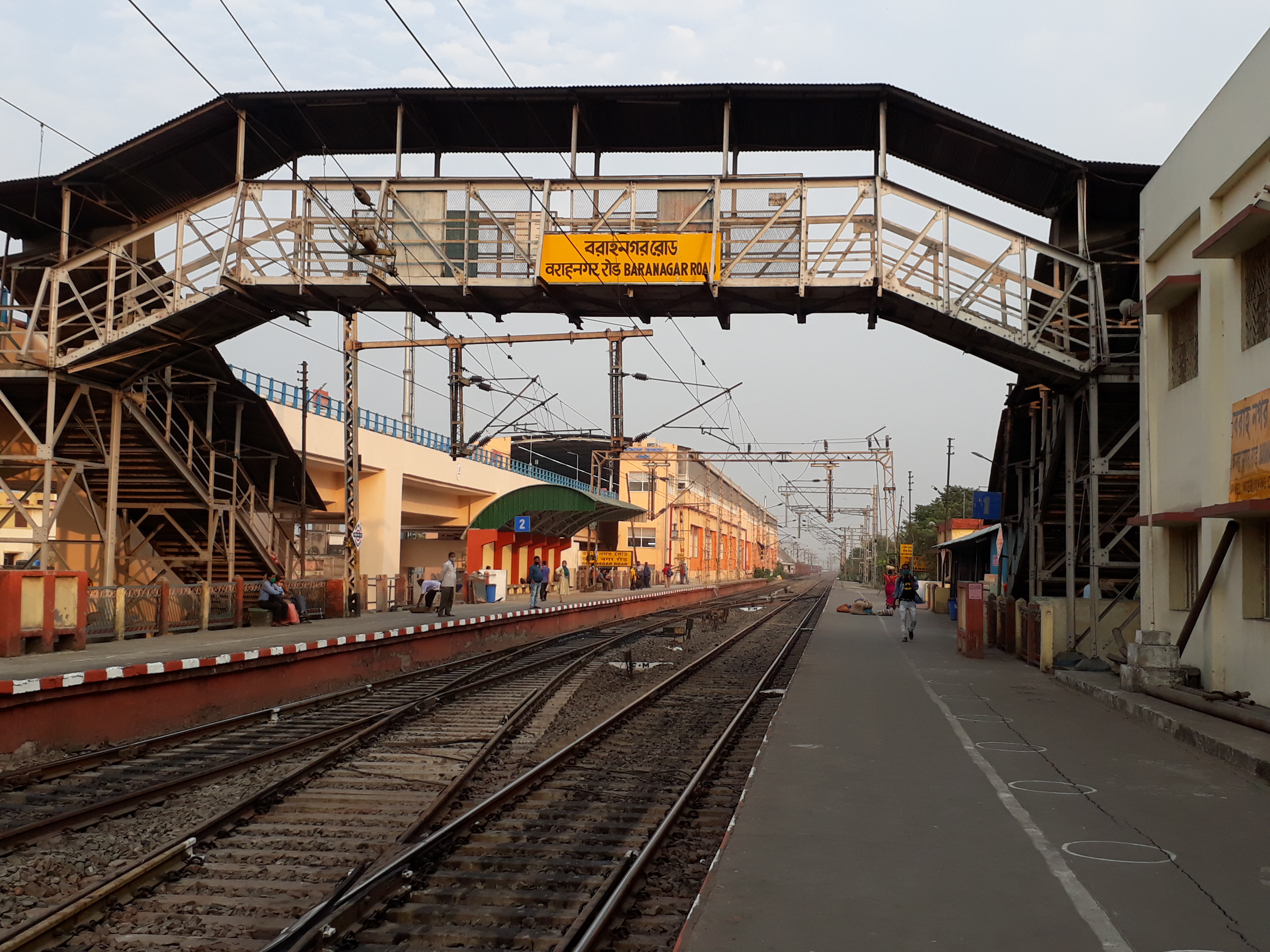
Baranagar Road railway station and Baranagar metro station (behind)

The Baranagar–Barrackpore metro line (or Pink Line) is a 12.5 km (7.8 mi) northward extension of the Kolkata Metro network along BT Road with Baranagar metro station serving as the interchange between Blue and Pink Lines. It was sanctioned at a cost of ₹2,069.6 crore (equivalent to ₹51 billion or US$530 million in 2026) in the 2010–2011 budget. This line was meant to enable a quick commute from the northernmost suburbs to South Kolkata.

Although the work never started as the Government of West Bengal had proposed for realignment of the line via Kalyani Expressway, due to the presence of arterial water pipelines under BT Road, that supply water to Kolkata. The construction work might damage the water pipelines, cutting off the city's water supply. It might also create huge traffic congestion on the busy road. As of 2021, Shyambazar and Baranagar metro station are connected with the trunk road.

== Palta-Tala pipeline ==
Potable water pipeline connections from Palta Waterworks to Kolkata, along the BT Road, existed since the late 1860s. After the construction of the Tala tank, it was joined with 42 in (110 cm) diameter cast iron pipes. There are six pipelines of 42–70 in (110–180 cm) diameter, under BT Road connecting the Tala reservoir with Palta. It also carries water pipes of other municipalities including Sodepur and Panihati.

== Major intersections ==
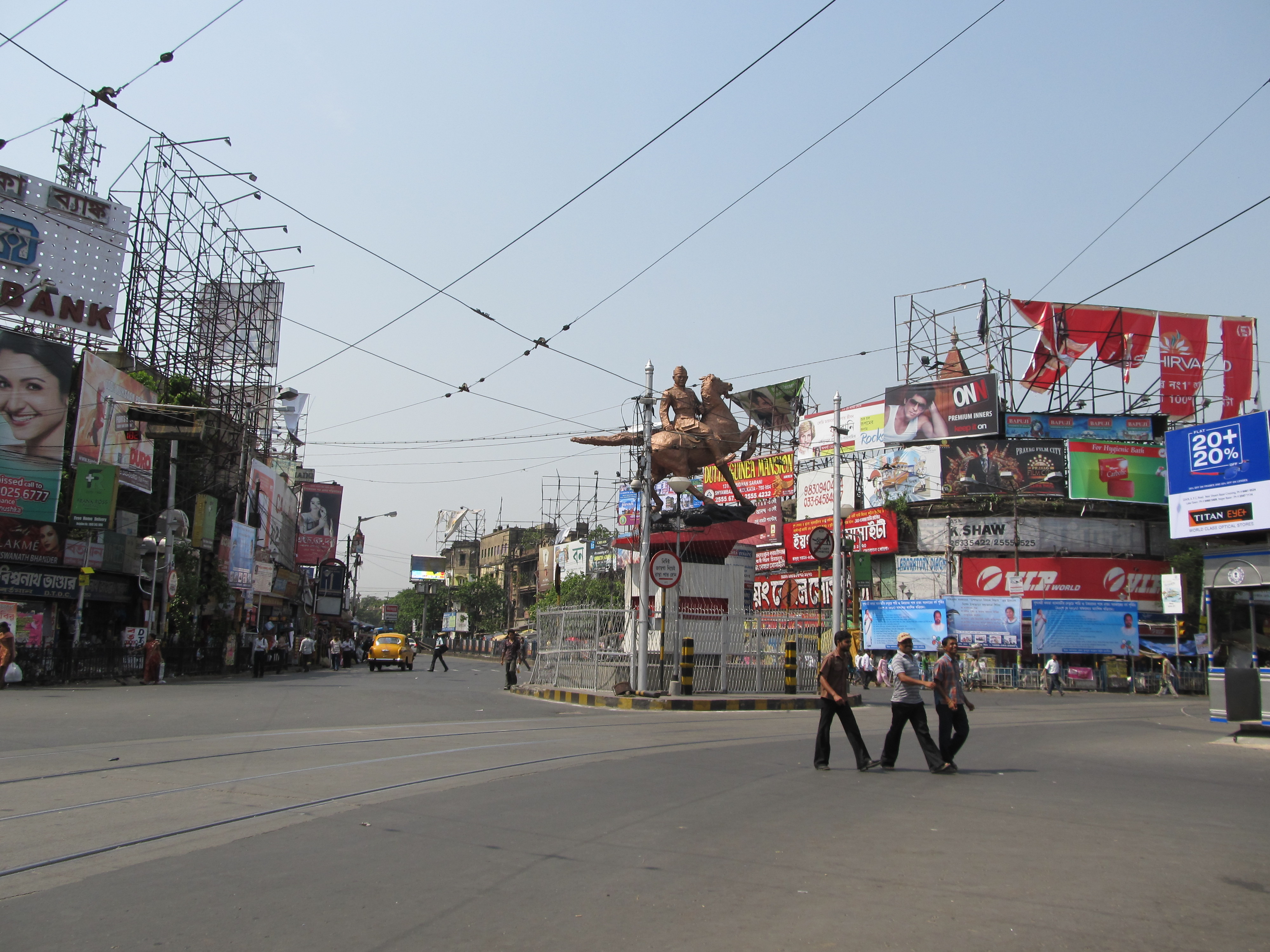
Barrackpore Trunk Road end at Shyambazar 5-point crossing

The entire route is in West Bengal.

| Location | Distance | Destinations | Notes |
|---|---|---|---|
| Shyambazar | 0.0 km (0 mi) | | Southern terminus |
| Dunlop | 5.8 km (3.6 mi) | Belghoria Expressway | |
| Barrackpore | 18.1 km (11.2 mi) | State Highway 1 State Highway 2 | Northern terminus |

== See also ==
- Jessore Road
- Dum Dum Road
- National Highway 12 (India)
