= Subhash Nagar metro station =

Subhash Nagar metro station may refer to these metro stations in India named after Indian independence activist Subhas Chandra Bose:

- Subhash Nagar metro station (Delhi)
- Subhash Nagar metro station (Nagpur)
- Subhash Nagar metro station on the Jaipur Metro Orange Line
- Subhas Nagar metro station on Pink Line (Kolkata Metro)

== See also ==
- Subhash (disambiguation)
- Nagar (disambiguation)
