= Shubha =

Shubha may refer to:

- Shubha (Arabic), doubt, obscurity, suspicion or mis-grounded conceit
- Shubha (name), a Hindu given name
- Shubha (film), a 2006 Bangladeshi film
- Shubha (actress), Indian film actress mainly in Malayalam films

== See also ==
- Subah (disambiguation)
- Suba (disambiguation)
- Subha (disambiguation)
