= Subah (disambiguation) =

Subah may refer to:

- Subah, a country division in Mughal India
  - Subah, a misnomer for a subahdar or nazim (governor) of a Subah
- Umbartha, also released as Subah, a 1982 Indian film by Jabbar Patel
- Subah (TV series), a 1987 Indian Hindi-language TV series
- Subah, a character from The Lingo Show, a children's TV show

== See also ==
- Subha (disambiguation)
- Suba (disambiguation)
- Shubha (disambiguation)
- Subedar, rank of a junior commissioned officer in the Indian and Pakistan armies
  - Subedar-major
