= Titagarh =

- City
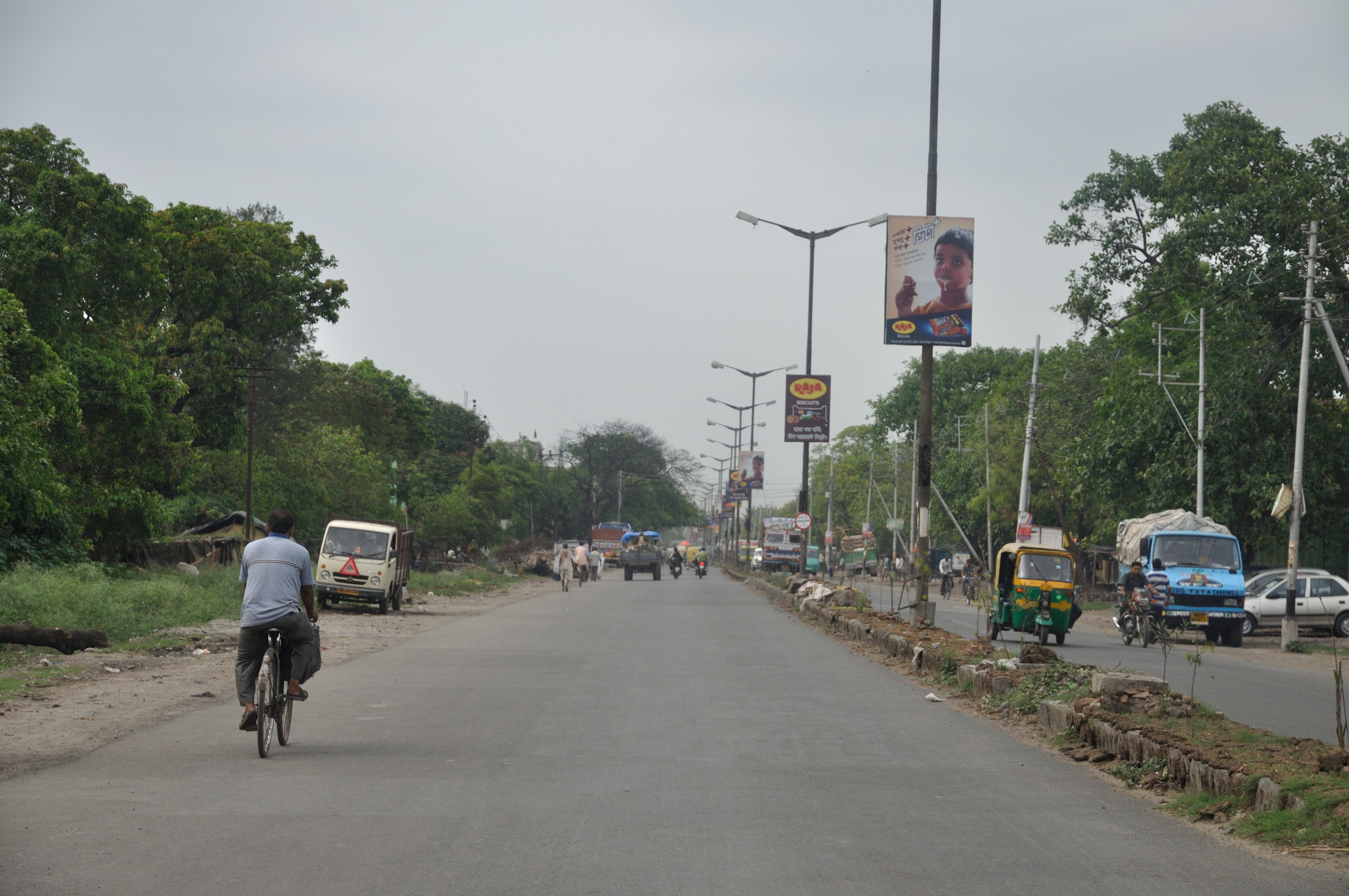
- Barrackpore Trunk Road in Titagarh

- Location in West Bengal, India Titagarh (India)
- Coordinates: 22.74°N 88.37°E
- Country: India
- State: West Bengal
- Division: Presidency
- District: North 24 Parganas

Government
  - Type: Municipality
  - Body: Titagarh Municipality
  - Chairman: KAMLESH SHAW

Area
  - Total: 3.24 km^{2} (1.25 sq mi)
- Elevation: 15 m (49 ft)

Population (2011)
  - Total: 116,541
  - Density: 36,000/km^{2} (93,200/sq mi)

Languages
  - Official: Bengali, Hindi, Telugu, Odia, English & Urdu
- Time zone: UTC+5:30 (IST)
- PIN: 700119
- Telephone code: +91 33
- Vehicle registration: WB
- Lok Sabha constituency: Barrackpore
- Vidhan Sabha constituency: Barrackpore

Titagarh is a city and a municipality of North 24 Parganas district in the Indian state of West Bengal. It is a part of the area covered by Kolkata Metropolitan Development Authority (KMDA).

== Geography ==
Cities and towns in the southern portion of Barrackpore subdivision in North 24 Parganas district
M: municipal city/ town, CT: census town,
N: neighbourhood/ administrative location
Owing to space constraints in the small map, the actual locations in a larger map may vary slightly

=== Location ===
Titagarh is located at 22.74°N 88.37°E. It has an average elevation of 15 metres (49 feet).

96% of the population of Barrackpore subdivision (partly presented in the map alongside, all places marked in the map are linked in the full screen map) lives in urban areas. In 2011, it had a population density of 10,967 per km^{2}. The subdivision has 16 municipalities and 24 census towns.

For most of the cities/ towns information regarding density of population is available in the Infobox. Population data is not available for neighbourhoods. It is available for the entire Municipal area and thereafter ward-wise.

Titagarh is bounded by Barrackpore on the north, Khardaha on the east and south and Hooghly River on the west.

== Demographics ==
=== Population ===
Population of Titagarh
| Year | Pop. | ±% |
|---|---|---|
| 1901 | 16,065 | — |
| 1911 | 45,171 | +181.2% |
| 1921 | 52,451 | +16.1% |
| 1931 | 49,584 | −5.5% |
| 1941 | 57,416 | +15.8% |
| 1951 | 71,622 | +24.7% |
| 1961 | 76,429 | +6.7% |
| 1971 | 88,218 | +15.4% |
| 1981 | 104,534 | +18.5% |
| 1991 | 114,085 | +9.1% |
| 2001 | 124,213 | +8.9% |
| 2011 | 116,541 | −6.2% |

As per the 2011 Census of India, Titagarh had a total population of 116,541, of which 62,735 (54%) were males and 53,806 (46%) were females. Population below 6 years was 11,510. The total number of literates in Titagarh was 84,160 (80.13% of the population over 6 years).

=== Languages ===
Languages spoken in Titagarh City (2011)
1. Bengali (12.9%)
2. Hindi (52.1%)
3. Urdu (22.5%)
4. Odia (4.70%)
5. Telugu (5.86%)
6. Others (1.94%)

As of 2001 India census, Titagarh had a population of 124,198. Males constitute 57% of the population and females 43%. Titagarh has an average literacy rate of 67%, higher than the national average of 59.5%: male literacy is 74% and female literacy is 57%. In Titagarh, 10% of the population is under 6 years of age.

=== Kolkata Urban Agglomeration ===
The following Municipalities, Census Towns and other locations in Barrackpore subdivision were part of Kolkata Urban Agglomeration in the 2011 census: Kanchrapara (M), Jetia (CT), Halisahar (M), Balibhara (CT), Naihati (M), Bhatpara (M), Kaugachhi (CT), Garshyamnagar (CT), Garulia (M), Ichhapur Defence Estate (CT), North Barrackpur (M), Barrackpur Cantonment (CB), Barrackpore (M), Jafarpur (CT), Ruiya (CT), Titagarh (M), Khardaha (M), Bandipur (CT), Panihati (M), Muragachha (CT) New Barrackpore (M), Chandpur (CT), Talbandha (CT), Patulia (CT), Kamarhati (M), Baranagar (M), South Dumdum (M), North Dumdum (M), Dum Dum (M), Noapara (CT), Babanpur (CT), Teghari (CT), Nanna (OG), Chakla (OG), Srotribati (OG) and Panpur (OG).

=== Police ===
Titagarh police station under Barrackpore Police Commissionerate has jurisdiction over Titagarh Municipal area.

=== Post Office ===
Titagarh has a delivery sub post office, with PIN 700119 in the North Presidency Division of Kolkata district in Calcutta region. Other post offices with the same PIN are Bisalaxmi Ghat, Bandipur, Bramhasthan and Patulia.

=== Infrastructure ===
As per the District Census Handbook 2011, Titagarh municipal city covered an area of 3.24 km^{2}. Amongst the civic amenities it had 34 km of roads and both open and closed drains. Amongst the educational facilities It had 85 primary schools, 10 middle schools, 10 secondary schools and 7 senior secondary schools. Amongst the commodities manufactured were jute, fertiliser and wagons. It had 4 bank branches.

According to the Barrackpore administration, the facilities available at Titagarh include 80 km roads (65 pucca, 11 kuchha, 4 others), 80 km drains (50 pucca, 30 kuchha), 1 ferry ghat (Lakshmi ghat), 2 cinema halls (Lakshmi cinema hall, Sandhya cinema hall), medical centres (Titagarh Municipal Matrisadan, ESOPD, Health Admn Unit I, Health Admn Unit II) and 4 post offices/ sub post offices (Titagarh, Bramhasthan, Bisalaxmighat, Jeliapara).

See also Cities and towns in Barrackpore subdivision

== Economy ==
=== Industry ===
The Titagarh Paper Mills were set up at Titagarh and Kakinara in 1882. The group consisted of two paper mills in West Bengal, along with several jute mills and other associated factories, including Kinnison Jute Mill, Titagarh Jute Mill No. 2, Standard Jute Mill, Empire Jute Mill, George Salter India, Britannia Engineering Works, a CESC generating station, and other facilities, most of which were located in Titagarh, and at one time held under and governed by a single managing agency. The Titagarh Paper Mills, long established as India's leading manufacturer of specialty papers, currency note paper, and newsprint, produced a total of 38,550 tons of paper in 1947. The paper production facilities were extensively modernized and expanded between 1966 and 1974, to keep pace with the demands of India's burgeoning post-Independence press, and a third, leading-edge, paper mill of the TPM group was developed in Choudwar, Orissa, but the third paper mill was later sold to Ballarpur Industries Ltd. The successor of Titagarh Paper Mills is Titagarh Industries Ltd., located in Kolkata and formed as an umbrella organization, which in 1994 acquired Titagarh Paper Mills and its related facilities in West Bengal. The diversified company now includes Titagarh Paper Mills, Titagarh Wagons Ltd., Titagarh Steels, and, in other locations, Continental Valves, TIL Valves, Tecalemit Industries Ltd., and Panihati Rubber Ltd. A brief about the industries in Titagarh follows.

- Titagharh Industries Limited was incorporated in 2004. As of 2017, the directors of Titagarh Industries Ltd. are: Nandan Bhattacharya, Nikhil Kumar Barat, Ashoke Kumar Bose and Dinesh Arya. As of 2017, Titaghur Paper Mills Co. Ltd. is in the process of striking off. In 1998, Titagarh Industries Limited decided to spin off its steel and paper divisions into two different companies. In 2007, Titagarh Industries Limited changed its name to Titagarh Steels Limited.
- Titagarh Wagons Limited, established in 1997, is the second largest freight wagon manufacturer in India. It is headed by Jagdish Prasad Chowdhury, Executive Chairman of the company. It manufactures railway wagons, Bailey bridges, earth-moving and mining equipment etc. and a wholly owned subsidiary, Titagarh Marines Ltd. has forayed into ship building.
- The Empire Jute Co. Ltd. was established at Talpukur, Titagarh, in 1912. It employs around 3,000 people.
- Kinnison Jute Mill Co. Ltd. was incorporated in 1918. Kinnison Jute Mill was nationalised in 1980 and made a part of National Jute Manufactures Corporation Limited. It was closed in 2004 and after implementation of a revival scheme Kinnison Jute Mill was reopened in 2011. The Union Cabinet, at a meeting held on 10 October 2018, chaired by Prime Minister Narendra Modi, gave the green signal for the closure of National Jute Manufacturers Corporation Ltd. (NJMC) along with its subsidiary Birds Jute and Exporters Ltd. (BJEL). NJMC had been incurring losses for several years and was under reference to BIFR since 1993. The Mills of NJMC which were proposed for revival, namely, Kinnison Mill at Titagarh, Khardah Mill at Khardah and RBHM Mill at Katihar were under suspension since August, 2016.

There are a number of jute mills in the Titagarh area listed by the Jute Commissioner: Kelvin Jute Mill (Trend Vyapar), Titagarh Jute Mill (Loomtex Engineering) and Sunbeam Vanijya. These mills are not declared as closed but they do not seem to be in operation. Information about these mills is not readily available.

• The Jay Shree Chemicals & Fertilizers

•The Factory of The Jay Shree Chemicals & Fertilizers is situated on the eastern bank of river Hooghly about one Km interior of B.T. Road in Khardah, West Bengal, India. •The Factory was commissioned in 1961 with facilities for manufacturing Sulphuric Acid and Single Superphosphate. We are marketing the Single Superphosphate under our Brand “Annapurna”..

== Transport ==
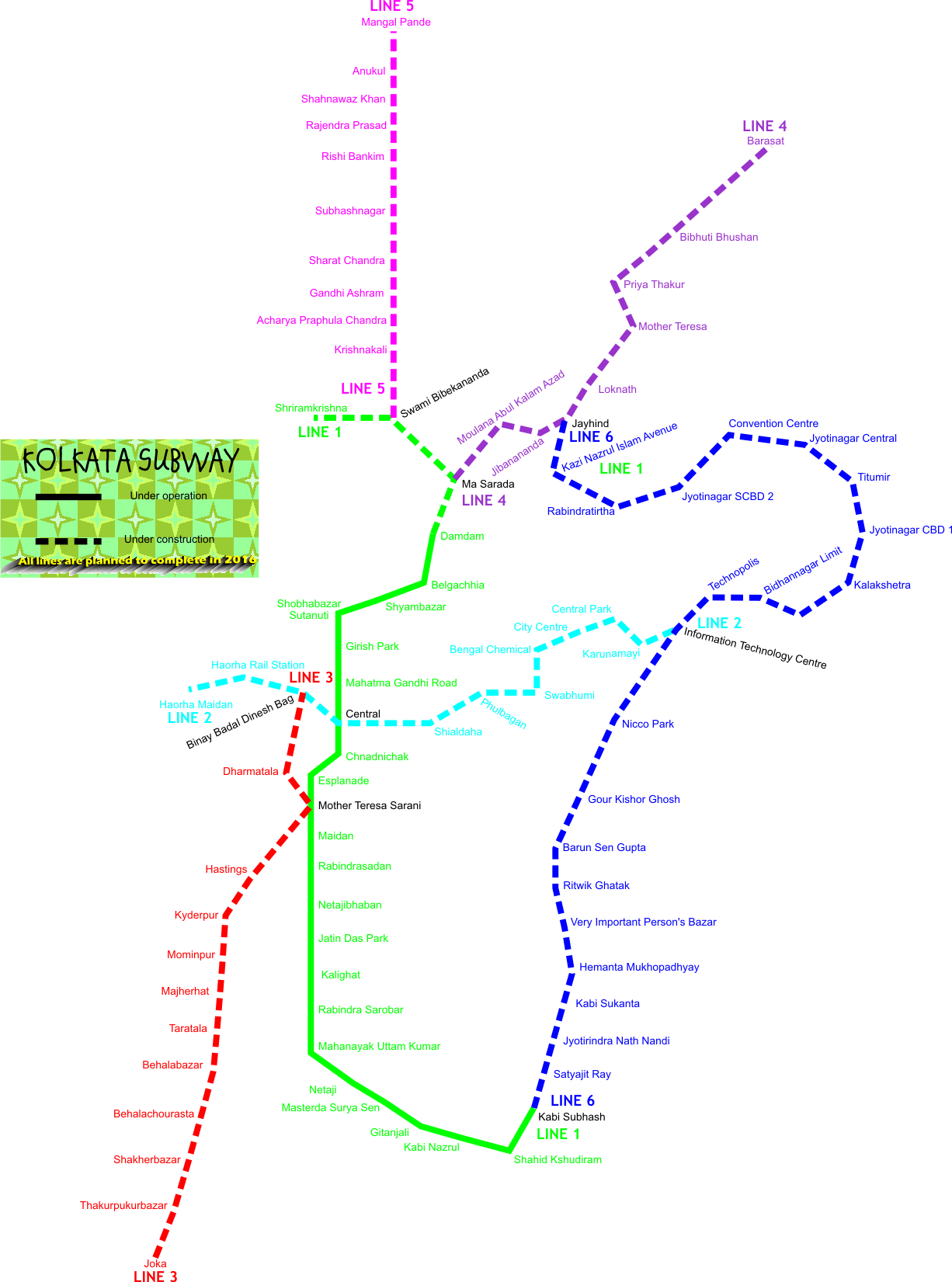
Kolkata new proposed Metro Pink Line (Baranagar - Barrackpore)

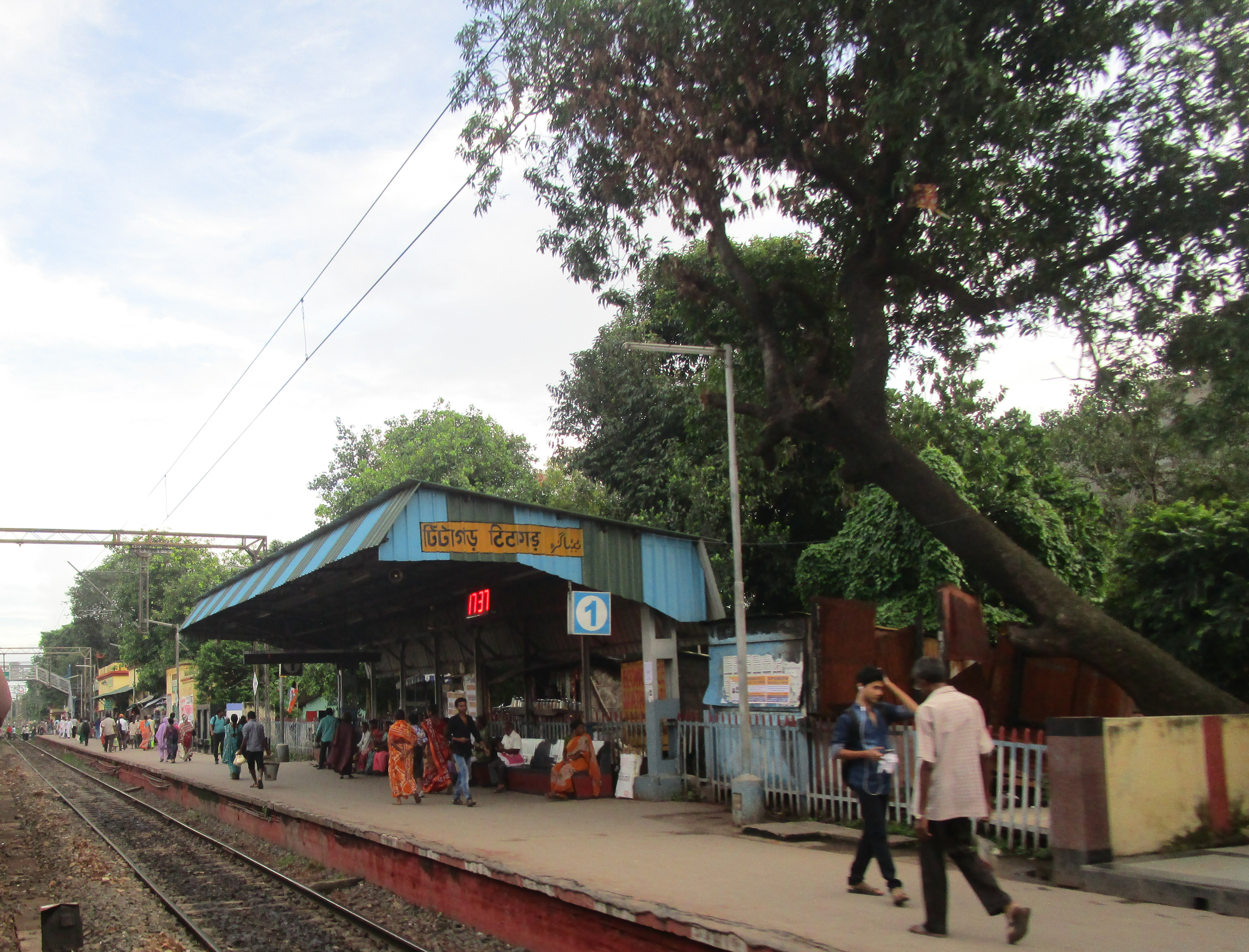
Titagarh railway station

Barrackpore Trunk Road (B.T. Road) passes through Titagarh.

78 is the most frequent bus in Titagarh which runs from Barrackpore Court to Esplanade. Besides many buses connect Titagarh to various neighbourhoods - 81/1 (Barasat to Rajchandrapur), C28 and S32 (Barrackpore Court to Howrah Station), S11 (Nilganj to Esplanade), E32 (Nilganj to Howrah Station) etc.

Titagarh railway station on the Sealdah-Ranaghat line is 20 km from Sealdah Station. It is part of the Kolkata Suburban Railway system.

Peer Ghat links to Maniktala Ferry Ghat (also popular as Sri Sri Radhaballabh Jiu Ganga Ghat) at Serampore. Lakshmi Ghat links to Mahesh Jagganath Ferry Ghat at Rishra.

== Education ==
The schools here are:

- Titagarh Upendra Bhajna Vidyapith High School, affiliated to West Bengal Board (Odia medium)
- Titagarh A.G.M. High School, affiliated to West Bengal Board (Urdu medium)
- Titagarh Angelo Vernacular High School, affiliated to West Bengal Board (Hindi medium)
- Titagarh Free India High School, affiliated to West Bengal Board (Urdu medium)
- Titagarh Arya Vidyalaya, affiliated to West Bengal Board (Hindi medium)
- Titagarh Andhra vidyalayam, affiliated to West Bengal board(Telugu medium)
- Jyotirmaya yuvajana vidhyakendram, affiliated to West Bengal board (Telugu medium)

== Culture ==
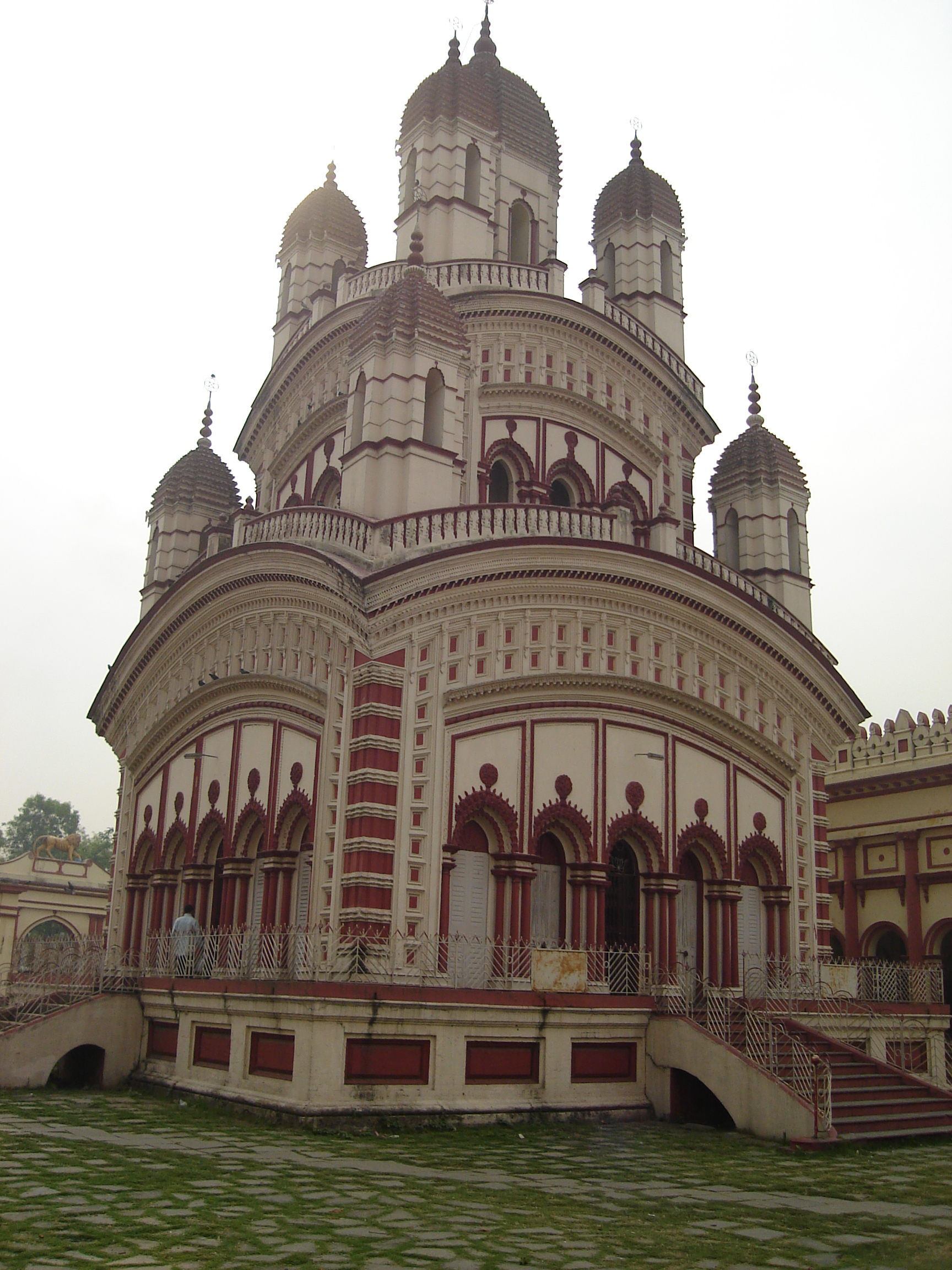
Annapurna temple

The Annapurna Temple, Titagarh, a temple of Devi Annapurna situated at Talpukur, Titagarh, Barrackpore, was built in 1875, by Jagadamba Devi, youngest daughter of Rani Rashmoni. She was married to Mathur Mohan Biswas, who after the death of his first wife Karunamoyee, third daughter of Rani Rashmoni, married Jagadamba Devi. The temple was opened to devotees by Ramakrishna Paramahansadeb. The temple, located on the bank of the Ganges at Rasmani ghat, has many similarities with the Bhavatarini temple at Dakshineswar. It is a Navaratna temple.
