= Suba =

Suba may refer to:

== Groups of people ==
- Suba people (Kenya), a people of Kenya
  - Suba language
- Suba people (Tanzania), a people of Tanzania
- Subha (writers), alternatively spelt Suba, Indian writer duo

== Individual people ==
- Suba (musician), Serbian-Brazilian musician
- Mihai Șubă (1947–2025), Romanian chess grandmaster
- Miklos Suba (1880–1944), Hungarian-born American artist and architect
- Susanne Suba (1913–2012), Hungarian-born watercolorist and illustrator, active in the United States; daughter of Miklos

== Places ==
- Suba District, a former district of Nyanza Province, Kenya
- Suba, Bogotá, a locality of Bogotá
  - Avenida Suba (Bogotá), main avenue in the city, named after the locality
- Suba, Jerusalem, a Palestinian village near Jerusalem depopulated in 1948

== Other ==
- Suba (film), a 2010 Sri Lankan Sinhala drama film
- Okinawa soba

== See also ==
- Subah (disambiguation)
- Subba (disambiguation)
- Shubha (disambiguation)
- Subha (disambiguation)
