= Subba =

Subba may refer to:

- Ṣubba: The name by which adherents of Mandaeism are commonly known in the Middle East.
- Subba: A historical title given to government officials in Kingdom of Nepal prior to the establishment of democracy.
- Subba: A surname associated with the Limbu people, an Kirati ethnic group of Nepal.

== People with the surname ==
- Abhaya Subba, Nepalese singer-songwriter and musician
- Dinesh Subba (born 1962), Nepalese composer, singer and lyricist
- Diwash Subba (born 1989), Bhutanese-Nepalese footballer
- Malvika Subba (born 1981), Nepalese media personality, beauty queen, actress, social activist, and entrepreneur
- Moni Kumar Subba (born 1958), Indian-Nepalese politician
- Nabin Subba (born 1967), Nepalese film director, screenwriter and producer
- Tanka Bahadur Subba, Indian-Nepalese anthropologist

== See also ==
- Subba Rao
- Suba (disambiguation)
