= Dunlop, Kolkata =

Neighbourhood in Baranagar of West Bengal, India

Dunlop
- Neighbourhood
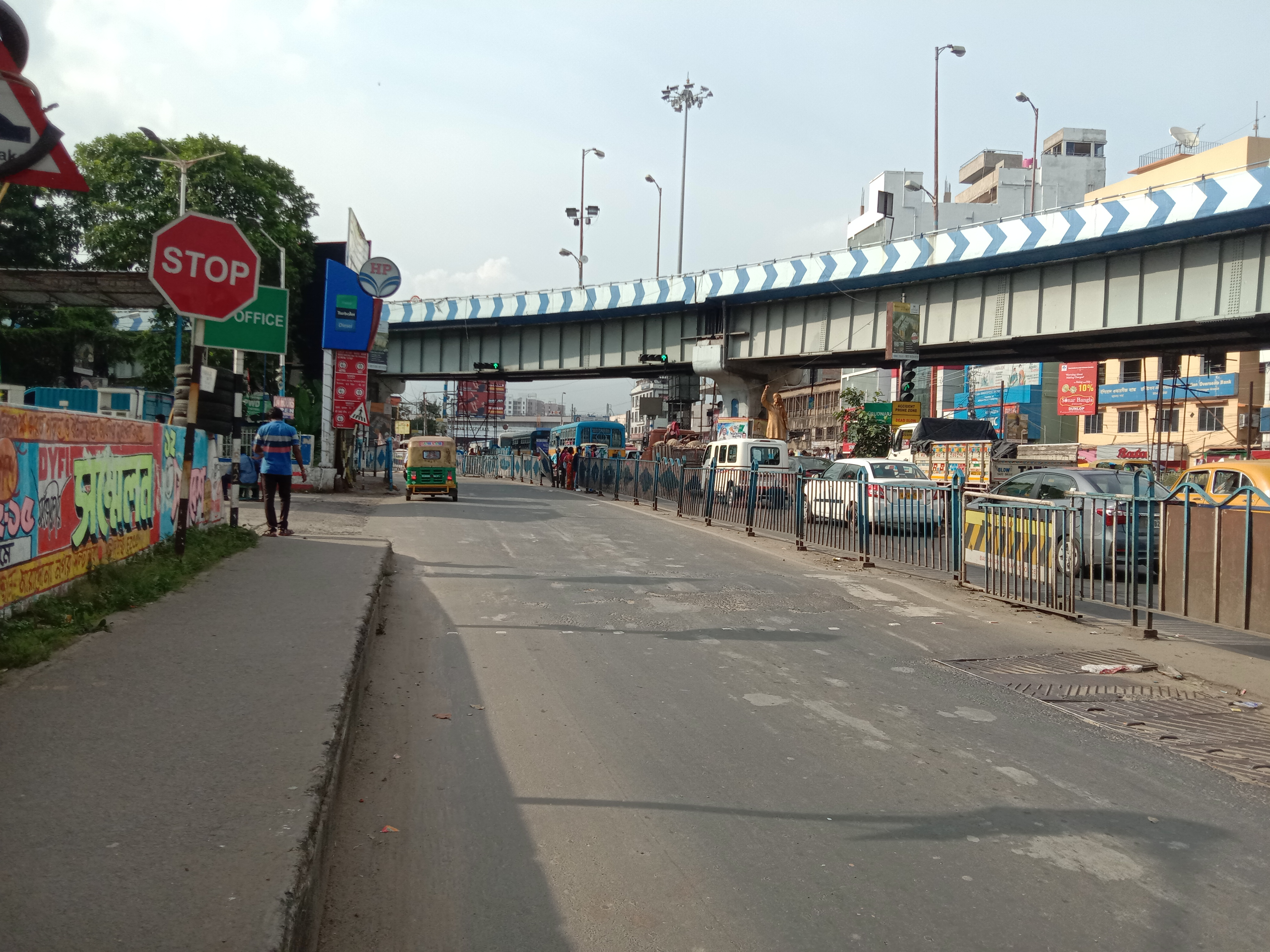
- Dunlop Crossing

- Location in Kolkata, West Bengal, India Dunlop (West Bengal) Dunlop (India) Dunlop (Asia)
- Coordinates: 22°39′08″N 88°22′37″E
- Country: India
- State: West Bengal
- Division: Presidency
- District: North 24 Parganas
- Metro Station: Baranagar
- Railway station: Baranagar Road

Government
  - Type: Municipality
  - Body: Baranagar Municipality
- Elevation: 12 m (39 ft)

Languages
  - Official: Bengali, English
- Time zone: UTC+5:30 (IST)
- PIN: 700108
- Telephone code: +91 33
- Vehicle registration: WB-23, WB-24
- Lok Sabha constituency: Dum Dum
- Vidhan Sabha constituency: Baranagar
- Website: baranagarmunicipality.org

Dunlop is a neighbourhood in Baranagar of North 24 Parganas district in the Indian state of West Bengal. It is a part of the area covered by Kolkata Metropolitan Development Authority (KMDA).

== Geography ==
=== Location ===
The boundary of Dunlop is :- in the east – the Rail line from Sealdah towards Dankuni and Baruipara; in the west – Dakshineswar and Hooghly River; in the north – Kamarhati and Belgharia and in the south – Alambazar, Baranagar Bazar and Bonhooghly. Dakshineswar Kali Temple lies just a quarter of a mile from this place.

== Transport ==
=== Road ===
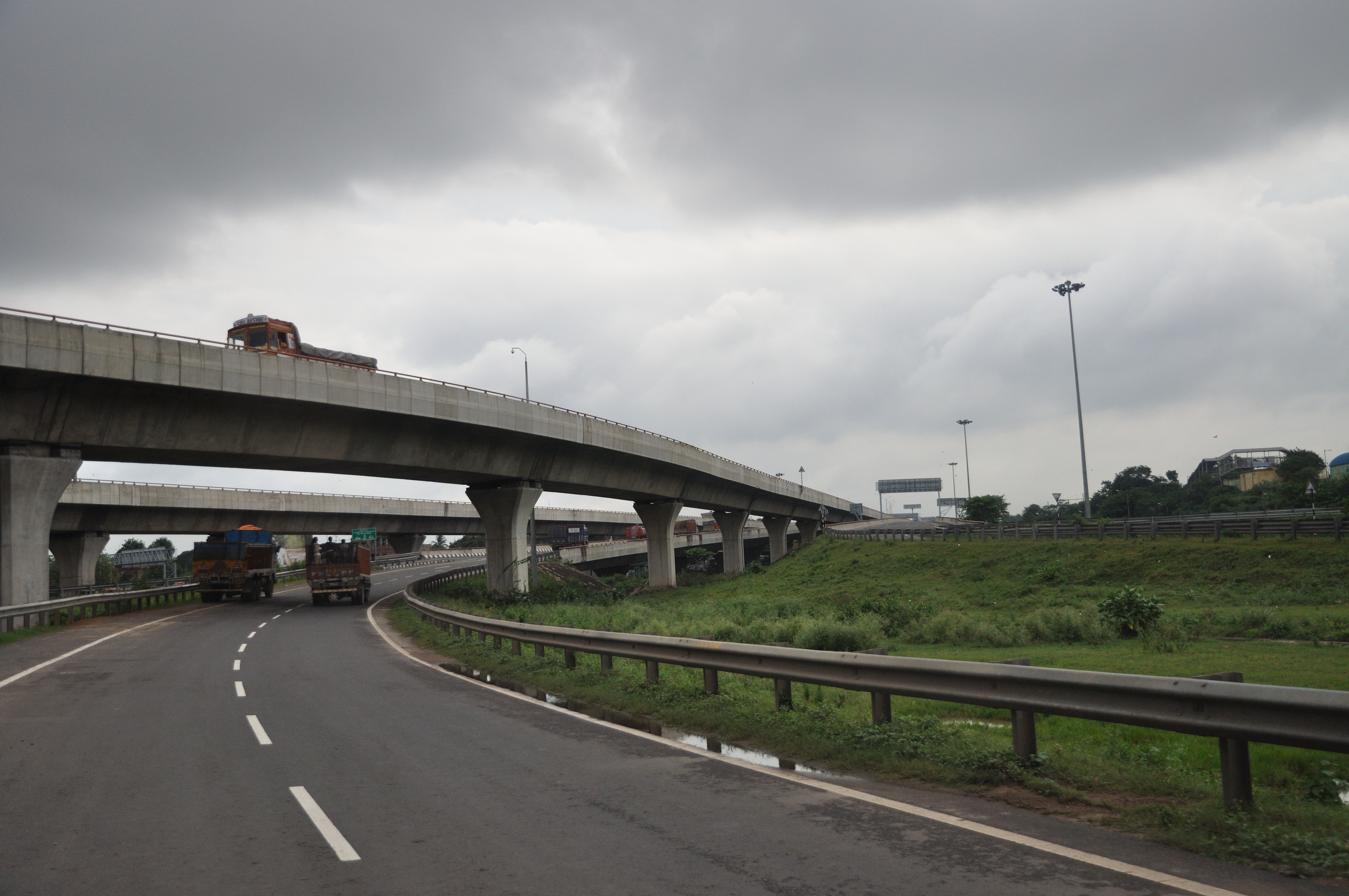
Belghoria Expressway, Dunlop

B.T. Road (part of both SH 1 and SH 2) passes through Dunlop. Belghoria Expressway also passes through Dunlop. "Dunlop Crossing" (B.T. Road, Gopal Lal Tagore Road and PWD Road Junction) is one of the largest crossings near Kolkata which connects Kolkata with Northern suburban areas and Howrah, Hooghly.

Shahid Bhagat Singh Flyover (Dunlop Bridge) connects B.T. Road (Saket Nagar) with PWD Road (Ashokgarh). It has easened smooth passing of the light vehicles at Dunlop Crossing. The flyover was opened on 8 October 2012.

=== Bus ===
Bus route numbers 26, 32A, 34B, 43, 56, 78, 78/1, 79, 81/1, 201, 214, 214A, 222, 230, 234, 234/1, 285, K4, DN2/1, DN9/1, DN43, DN44, DN46, S164 (Mini), S180 (Mini), S185 (Mini), AC54, AC54B, E32, ACT-32, ACT-23, S9A, S17A, S32, S57, S58, AC20, S23A, AC23A, AC50A, S11, C23 etc. ply through Dunlop in Baranagar.

=== Railways ===
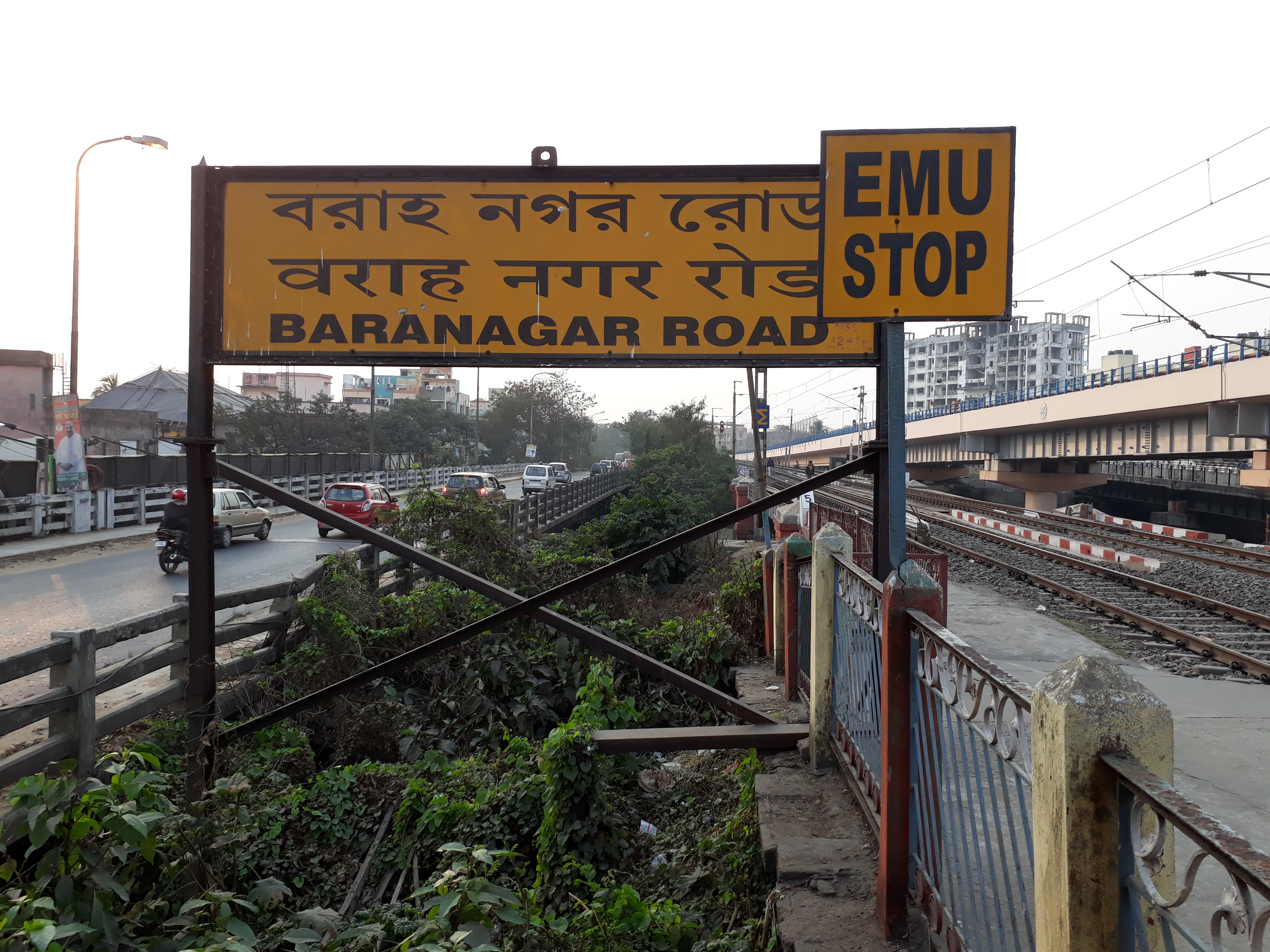
Baranagar Road railway station

Baranagar Road railway station is situated at Dunlop. It is a Kolkata suburban railway station. It is one of the oldest railway station. Sealdah - Dankuni line's trains pass through this station.

=== Metro railways ===
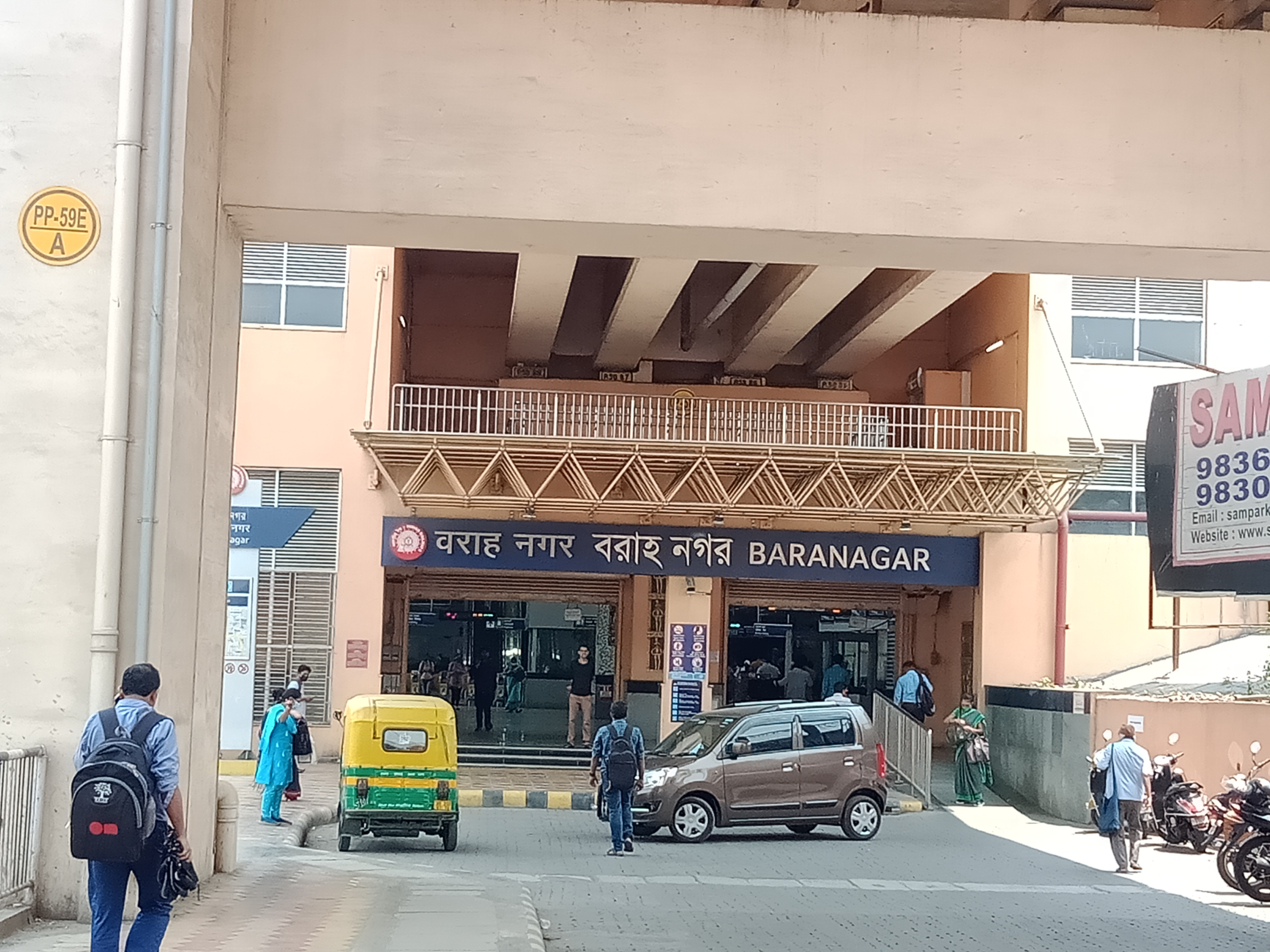
Baranagar metro station

The extension of Kolkata Metro Blue Line from Dum Dum to Dakshineswar was sanctioned in 2010–11. It was extended up to Noapara in 2013. The subsequent work was held up because of the encroachments on railway land. The Baranagar metro station was inaugurated on 22 February 2021 and commercial metro services were started on the following day.
