= Tala Bridge =

Tallah Bridge
- Coordinates: 22.6087115°N 88.3756963°E
- Carries: Four lane BT road; Footpaths on both sides for pedestrians
- Crosses: Kolkata Circular railway
- Locale: Kolkata, West Bengal
- Official name: Hemanta Setu
- Named for: Hemanta Kumar Basu
- Maintained by: Department of Public Works

Characteristics
- Total length: 743.43 metres (2,439 ft)
- Width: 24 metres (79 ft)

History
- Opened: 1962 (dismantled); 22 September 2022

Statistics
- Toll: No

Tala Bridge (officially Hemanta Setu) is a bridge on the Kolkata Circular railway in the Indian state state of West Bengal. It connects the Shyambazar area of Kolkata with the Kolkata's northern suburbs.

The bridge was opened in 1962, but due to structural weakness of the bridge, demolition work was started by Indian Railways from February 2020. The demolition work was completed by April 2020. The new bridge was opened on 22 September 2022. The total length of the new bridge is 743.43 meters. A total of 468 crore was spent to build the bridge. The bridge was built on a government initiative under the Department of Public Works.
