= Subhash Mukhopadhyay =

Subhash Mukhopadhyay may refer to:

- Subhash Mukhopadhyay (poet) (1919–2003), Indian Bengali poet
- Subhash Mukhopadhyay (physician) (1931–1981), Indian gynecologist
