= Baranagar metro station =

Metro station in North 24 Parganas, WB, India

Baranagar
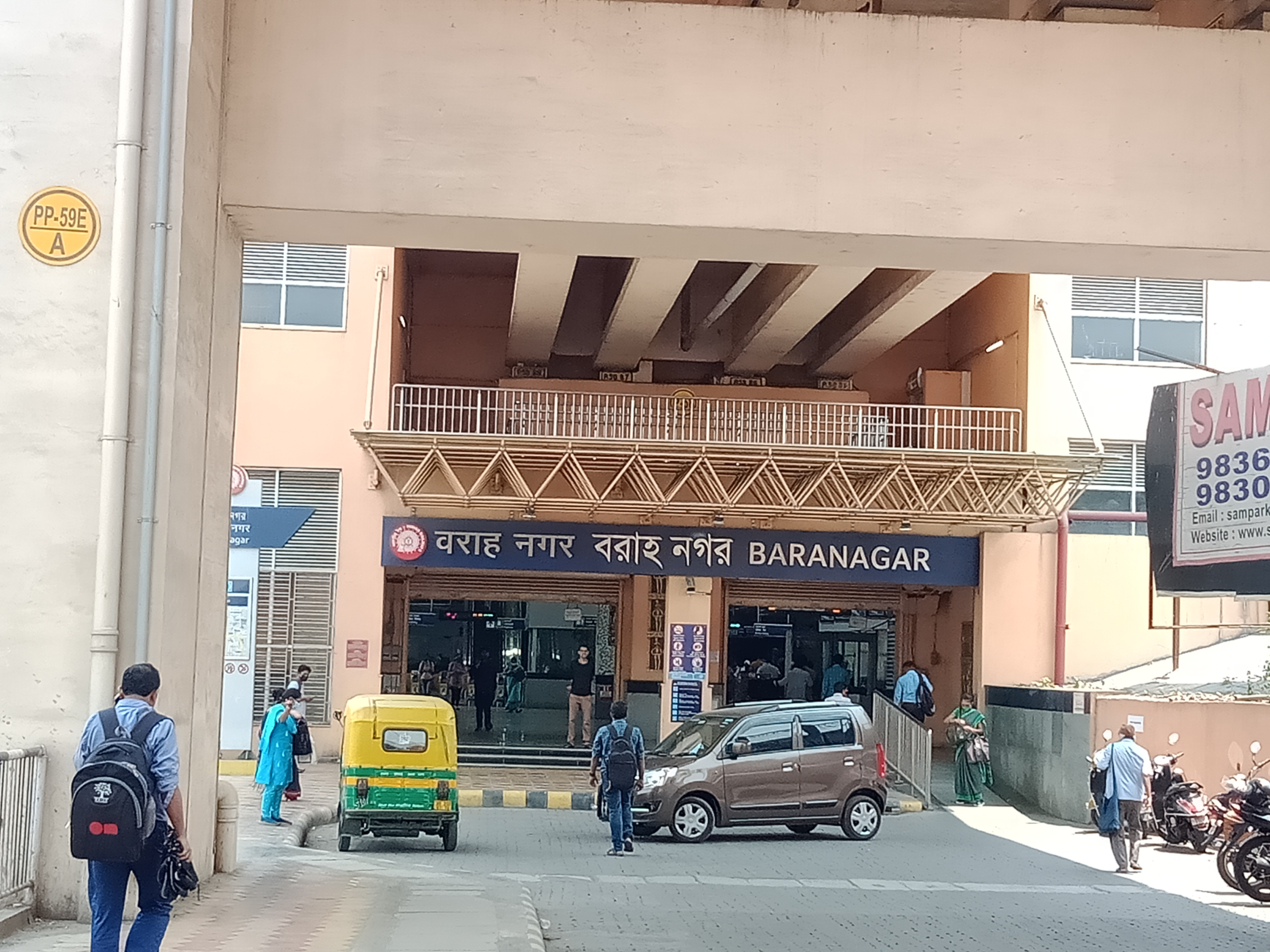
- Main entrance of station

General information
- Location: Baranagar Rd, Belghoria Expressway, Dunlop, Baranagar; North 24 Parganas, West Bengal 700108; India
- Coordinates: 22.6535°N 88.3788°E
- System: Kolkata Metro
- Operator: Metro Railway, Kolkata
- Lines: Blue Line; Pink Line (planned)
- Platforms: 2 (2 side platforms)
- Tracks: 2
- Connections: Baranagar Road: Chord link

Construction
- Parking: Yes
- Cycle facilities: No
- Accessible: Yes
- Architect: H K Barjatya

Other information
- Status: Operational
- Station code: KBAR

History
- Opened: 22 February 2021; 5 years ago

Services
Preceding station	Kolkata Metro	Following station
Dakshineswar Terminus	Blue Line	Noapara towards Shahid Khudiram
Krishna Kali towards Mangal Pandey	Pink Line (planned)	Terminus
Route map
Location

Baranagar (also known as JSW Baranagar for sponsorship reasons) is an elevated metro station on the Blue Line of Kolkata Metro which is off Barrackpore Trunk Road at Dunlop in Baranagar, Kolkata, West Bengal, India. The metro station adjoins the platforms of the Baranagar Road railway station where connections can be made with Indian Railways services. The station was inaugurated on 22 February 2021. The station will be a future interchange when it hosts Pink Line of Kolkata Metro till Barrackpore.

== History ==
Then in February 2019, the metro line to the Dakshineswar station was projected to be operational by February 2020. A slightly delayed March 2020 projected operation date was announced in late 2019. And a July 2020 projected operation date was mentioned in February 2020. By June 2019, over 95 percent of the viaduct had been completed for the between Noapara and Dakshineswar and that work had begun on the signalling system and laying of the tracks.

== Station layout ==
L2	Side platform, Doors will open on the left
L2	Platform 2	Train towards Shahid Khudiram (Noapara) →
L2	Platform 1	← Train towards Dakshineswar (terminus)
L2	Side platform, Doors will open on the left
L1	Concourse	Fare control, station agent, Metro QR ticket vending machines, crossover
G	Street level	Exit/Entrance

== Connections ==
=== Train ===
It is connected with Baranagar Road railway station of Chord link line of Kolkata Suburban Railway.

=== Bus ===
This station is connected with B.T. Road and Belghoria Expressway. Bus route numbers 26, 26C, 32A, 34B, 43, 56, 78, 78/1, 79, 81/1, 201, 214, 214A, 222, 230, 234, 234/1, 285, K4, DN2, DN2/1, DN9/1, DN43, DN44, DN46, S164 (Mini), S180 (Mini), S185 (Mini), AC54, AC54B, E32, S9A, AC20, S23A, AC23A, C23, AC50A, S11, S32, S57, S58 etc. serve the station.

=== Auto ===
Several auto services are available on B. T. Road towards Dakshineswar, Sinthee, Barrackpore and Sodepur.

== See also ==
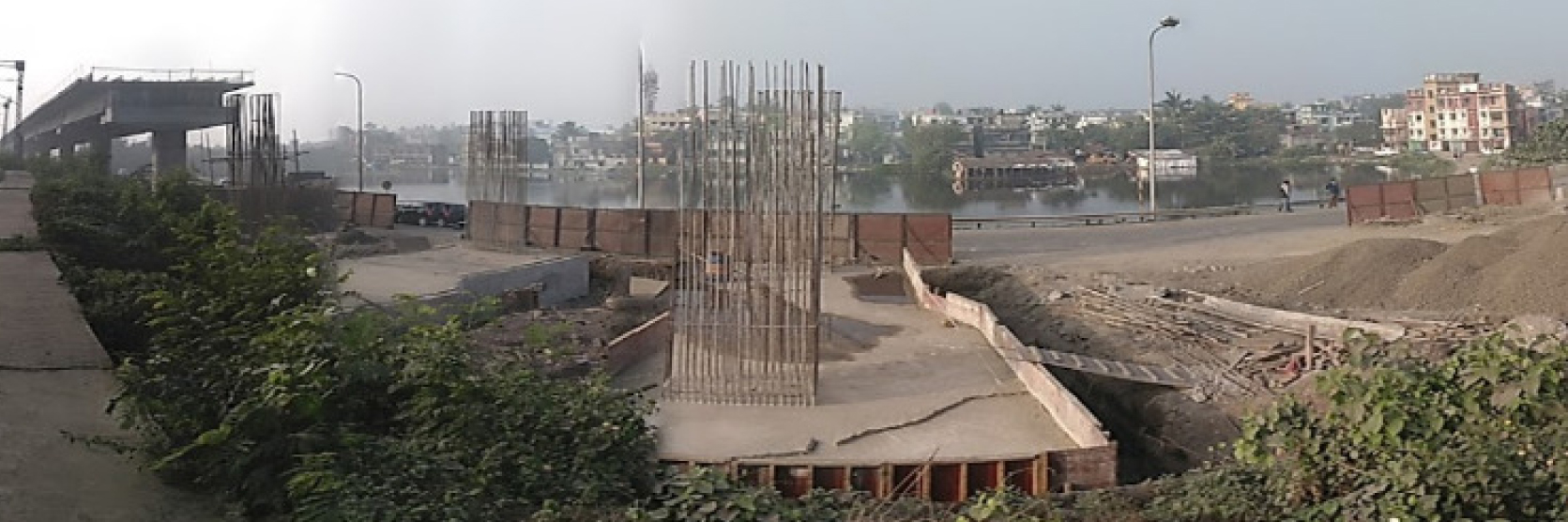
Baranagar metro station during construction

- List of Kolkata Metro stations
