= Subhash Bhojwani =

Indian air force officer

Air Marshal Subhash Bhojwani PVSM, AVSM, VSM
- Military career
- Allegiance: India
- Branch: Indian Air Force
- Service years: 1965–2006
- Rank: Air Marshal
- Commands: Training Command; Air Force Academy, Dundigul; No. 28 Squadron IAF
- Conflicts: Indo-Pakistani War of 1971; Kargil War
- Awards: Mentioned in Despatches; Ati Vishisht Seva Medal

Air Marshal Subhash Bhojwani is a former air officer of the Indian Air Force. He last served as the Air Officer Commanding-in-Chief Training Command between 2004 and 2006. His prior commands included those as the Commandant of Air Force Academy, Dundigul and as the Commanding Officer of 28 Squadron. He served as the Director of Air Operations (Offensive) during the 1999 Kargil War. He earned a Mention-in-Despatches for combat operations during the Indo-Pakistani War of 1971.

== Service career ==
Subhash Bhojwani was commissioned into the Indian Air Force (IAF) on 16 October 1965. As a flight lieutenant in the No. 1 Squadron IAF during the Indo-Pakistan War of 1971, he earned a Mentioned in Despatches for combat operations.

Bhojwani went on to become the commanding officer of the No. 28 Squadron IAF. He has served as a frontline combat pilot on a number of fighter aircraft, including the Hawker Hunter, MiG-21, Mirage 2000 and SEPECAT Jaguar.

During the Kargil War in 1999, then Air Commodore Bhojwani served as the director of air operations (offensive).

Following the war, he served as the commandant of the Air Force Academy. He was appointed the senior air staff officer (SASO) of the Western Air Command (WAC) in 2002. Air Marshal Bhojwani was appointed the air officer commanding-in-chief (AOC-in-C) of the Training Command (TC) in 2004. He retired from the Indian Air Force on 31 January 2006.

He has a postgraduate degree in defence & strategic studies from the University of Madras. He was named a Fellow of the Australian College of Defence & Strategic Studies in 1997.

Military offices
Preceded by Jogendra Singh Sisodia	Commandant – Air Force Academy; 2000 - 2002	Succeeded by Vinod Kumar Verma
