= Subhash vihar =

Subhash vihar subhash vihar
- city
- Location in Delhi, India
- Coordinates: 28.41°N 77.16°E
- Country: India
- State: Delhi
- District: Northeast Delhi

Government
  - Body: Municipal Corporation of Delhi

Languages
  - Official: Hindi, English
- Time zone: UTC+5:30 (IST)
- Telephone code: 011
- Civic agency: Municipal Corporation of Delhi

subhash vihar water tank

Subhash vihar is a residential area of the Northeast Delhi district of Delhi, India, near Bhajanpura and Yamuna vihar. Subhash vihar is 1 km from the Bhajanpura bus stand. It is 5 km from River Yamuna and 8 km to ISBT Kashmiri Gate, it come under the legislative assembly of Ghonda. The counsellor of this area is vijay bahal of Bharatiya Janata Party.

== See also ==
- Sahab Singh Chauhan
- Bhajanpura
