= Texmaco Rail & Engineering =

Rolling stock manufacturer in Kolkata, West Bengal, India

Texmaco Rail & Engineering Ltd.

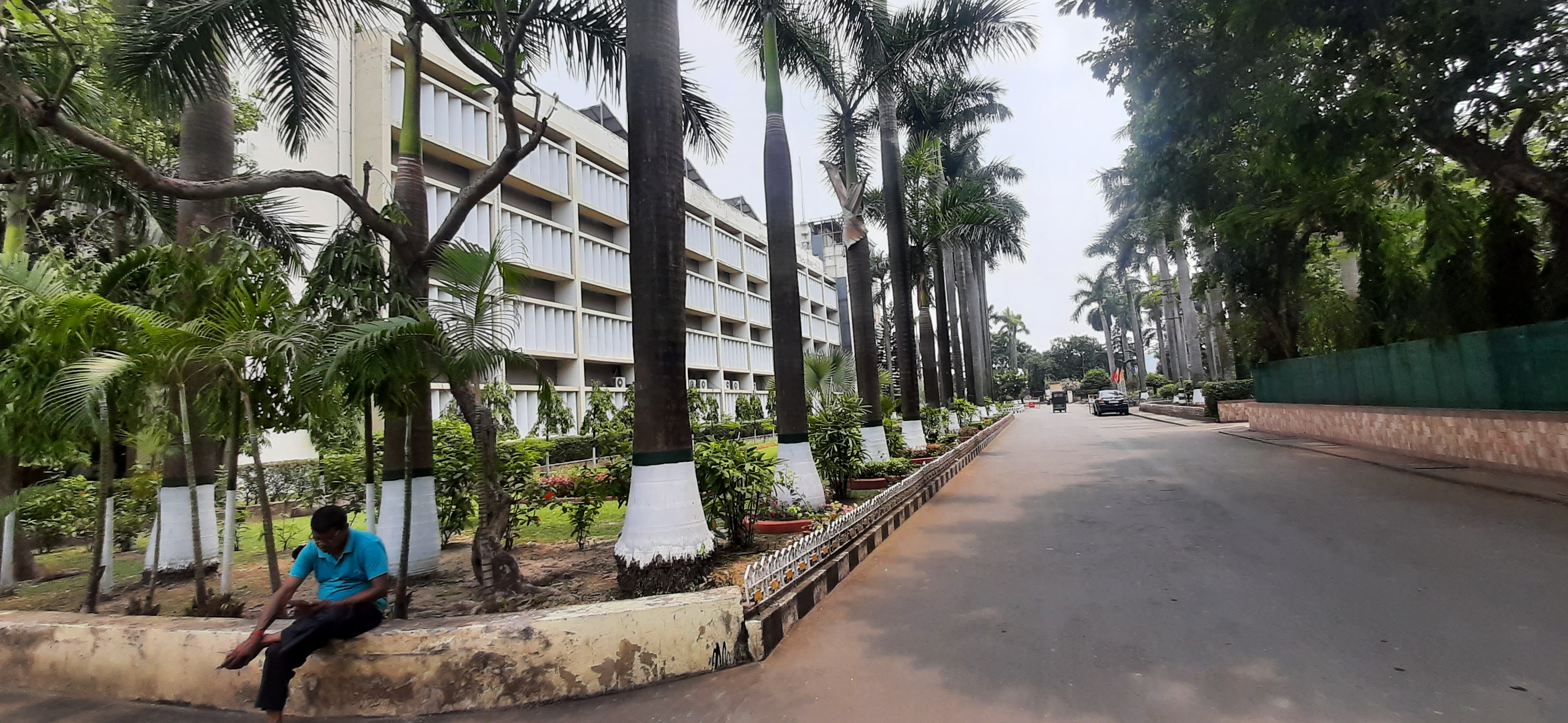
- Texmaco Rail's headquarter in Kolkata
- Type: Public
- Traded as: BSE: 533326; NSE: TEXINFRA
- ISIN: INE621L01012
- Industry: Railways; Heavy equipment Defense
- Founded: 1939; 87 years ago
- Founder: K. K. Birla
- Headquarters: Kolkata, West Bengal, India
- Area served: Worldwide
- Key people: Saroj Poddar (Executive Chairman); D.H. Kela (Executive Director & CEO); Indrajit Mookerjee (Vice Chairman)
- Products: Freight wagons; Locomotive shells; Rolling stock
- Revenue: ▲₹2,269.65 crore (US$240 million) (2023)
- Net income: ▲₹26.02 crore (US$2.7 million) (2023)
- Total assets: ▲₹2,664.05 crore (US$280 million) (2022)
- Total equity: ▲₹1,330.54 crore (US$140 million) (2022)
- Parent: Adventz Group
- Website: www.texmaco.in

Texmaco Rail & Engineering Ltd. is an Indian engineering and infrastructure company that is primarily engaged in manufacturing railway wagons, coaches, and locomotives, as well as providing related services. The company is part of Adventz Group and headquartered in Kolkata. The company manufactures coaches for the Indian Railways and private firms.

== Operations ==
Texmaco Rail and Engineering Ltd is involved in the business of manufacturing of rolling stock, such as wagons, coaches, EMUs, loco shells & parts, etc., hydro mechanical equipment, steel castings, rail EPC, bridges and other steel structures. It has supplied its products to Indian Railways, private freight operators, and metro rail projects in India. The company also exports its rolling stock and services to international markets.

Apart from manufacturing rolling stock, Texmaco Rail and Engineering Ltd is involved in executing infrastructure projects related to railways and urban transport systems. It undertakes the construction of railway bridges, signalling systems, electrification, and track laying, among other aspects of railway infrastructure.

Texmaco Rail and Engineering Ltd has partnerships with Wabtec Corporation (formerly GE Transportation) and Nymburk, among others.

=== Subsidiaries ===
Texmaco Rail and Engineering Ltd has subsidiaries including Texmaco Infrastructure and Holdings Ltd (focused on infrastructure projects) and Bright Power Projects (India) Pvt Ltd (involved in renewable energy projects).

Texmaco also holds 41% stake in Texmaco Defence Systems Private Ltd. (TDSPL).

== Shareholding ==
The equity shares of Texmaco Rail & Engineering are listed on the Bombay Stock Exchange, and the National Stock Exchange of India. As on 31 March 2023, Saroj Poddar-led Adventz Group held 58.56% shares in Texmaco Rail & Engineering.

== See also ==
- Rail transport in India
