= Subhash Bhaskar Nair =

Subhash Bhaskar Nair (1964–2004) was a gangster and hitman, who was shot dead by the Gujarat police during an encounter in Valsad in June 2004. He was convicted of multiple murders, including that of the former Daman MP Kalidas Patel on 6 January 2003. For many years, Subhash Nair topped the list of Gujarat's most wanted criminals.

== Background ==
Subhash Nair was born in a Keralite family and joined the Indian Army when he was 18 years of age. He served for 10 years and was discharged in 1993 for bad conduct. After this he turned to criminal activities by robbing a petrol pump in Surat. He came to the attention of the Gujarat law enforcement agencies after he murdered two labourers in 1995.

Nair was attacked and severely injured by gangster Mahalingam Shiva in 2003.. In April 2004, he murdered Deepak Patel, a famous bootlegger of Surat. At the time of his death, Nair was accused in more than 20 cases of murder and attempt to murder. Among his associates were Kartar Singh and Sojan Mathew.
