= Shubha (name) =

Shubha (शुभा) is a female given-name among Hindus and means auspicious, or bringing good luck. The meaning comes from the root, Shubh (शुभ). Notable people named Shubha include:

- Shubha Mudgal (born 1959), Hindustani classical music singer
- Shubha Raul (born 1967), Mayor of the Indian metropolis of Mumbai 2007–2009
