= Subash =

Subash may refer to:

- Subash Chandra Bose, Indian nationalist and freedom fighter
- Subash (film), a 1996 Indian Tamil-language action film
- Kuldu or Subash, a village in Kyrgyzstan

== See also ==
- Subhash (disambiguation)
