= Baranagar Road railway station =

Railway station in West Bengal, India

Baranagar Road
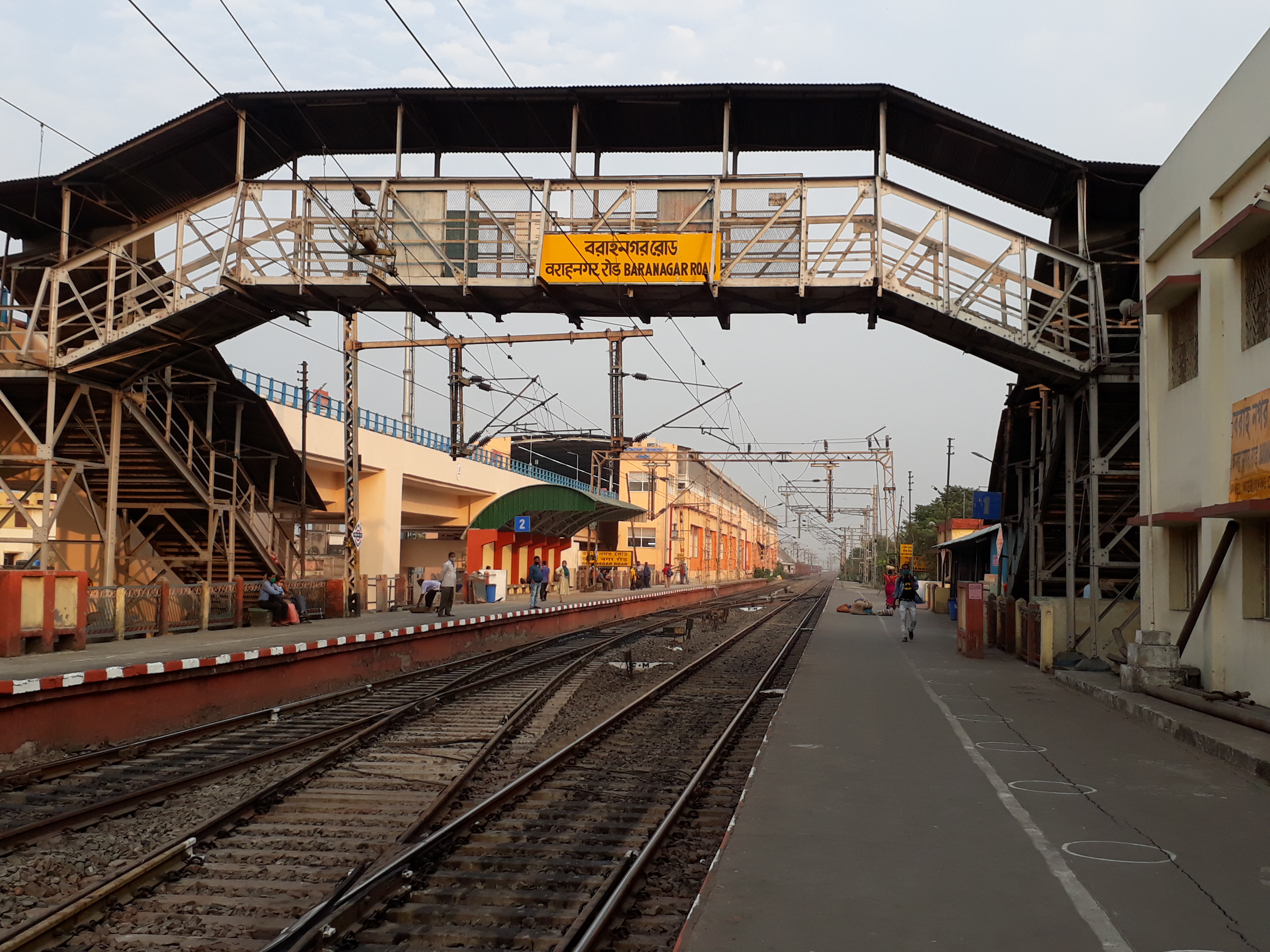
- Baranagar Road railway station

General information
- Location: Barrackpore Trunk Rd, Dunlop, Baranagar, Kolkata, West Bengal 700108; India
- Coordinates: 22.653482°N 88.378856°E
- Elevation: 10.00 metres (32.81 ft)
- System: Kolkata Suburban Railway
- Owner: Indian Railways
- Operator: Eastern Railway
- Platforms: 2 (Side platforms)
- Tracks: 2
- Connections: Baranagar; Belghoria Expressway; Barrackpore Trunk Road

Construction
- Structure type: At grade
- Parking: Not available
- Cycle facilities: Not available
- Accessible: Not available

Other information
- Status: Functioning
- Station code: BARN
- Zone(s): Eastern Railway
- Division(s): Sealdah

History
- Opened: 1932; 94 years ago
- Electrified: 1964–65
- Former names: Eastern Bengal Railway

Services
Preceding station	Kolkata Suburban Railway	Following station
Dum Dum towards Sealdah	Chord link Line	Dakshineswar towards Dankuni Junction
Route map
Location
- Location within Kolkata Location within West Bengal Location within India

Baranagar Road is a Kolkata Suburban Railway station on the Sealdah–Dankuni line in the city of Baranagar. The Baranagar metro station is adjacent to Baranagar Road railway station. It serves the local areas of Baranagar in North 24 Parganas district in the Indian state of West Bengal.

== History ==
Sealdah–Dankuni line was opened in 1932 by the Eastern Bengal Railway. The line was electrified in 1965.

== Station complex ==
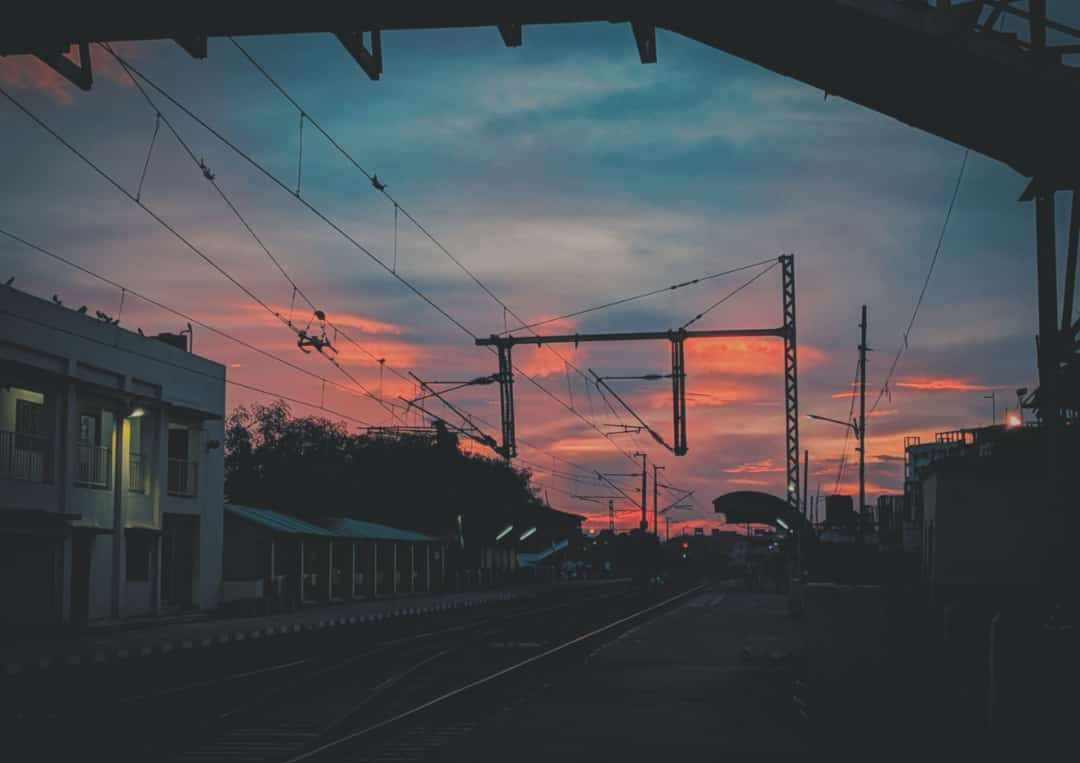
A view of station complex at afternoon

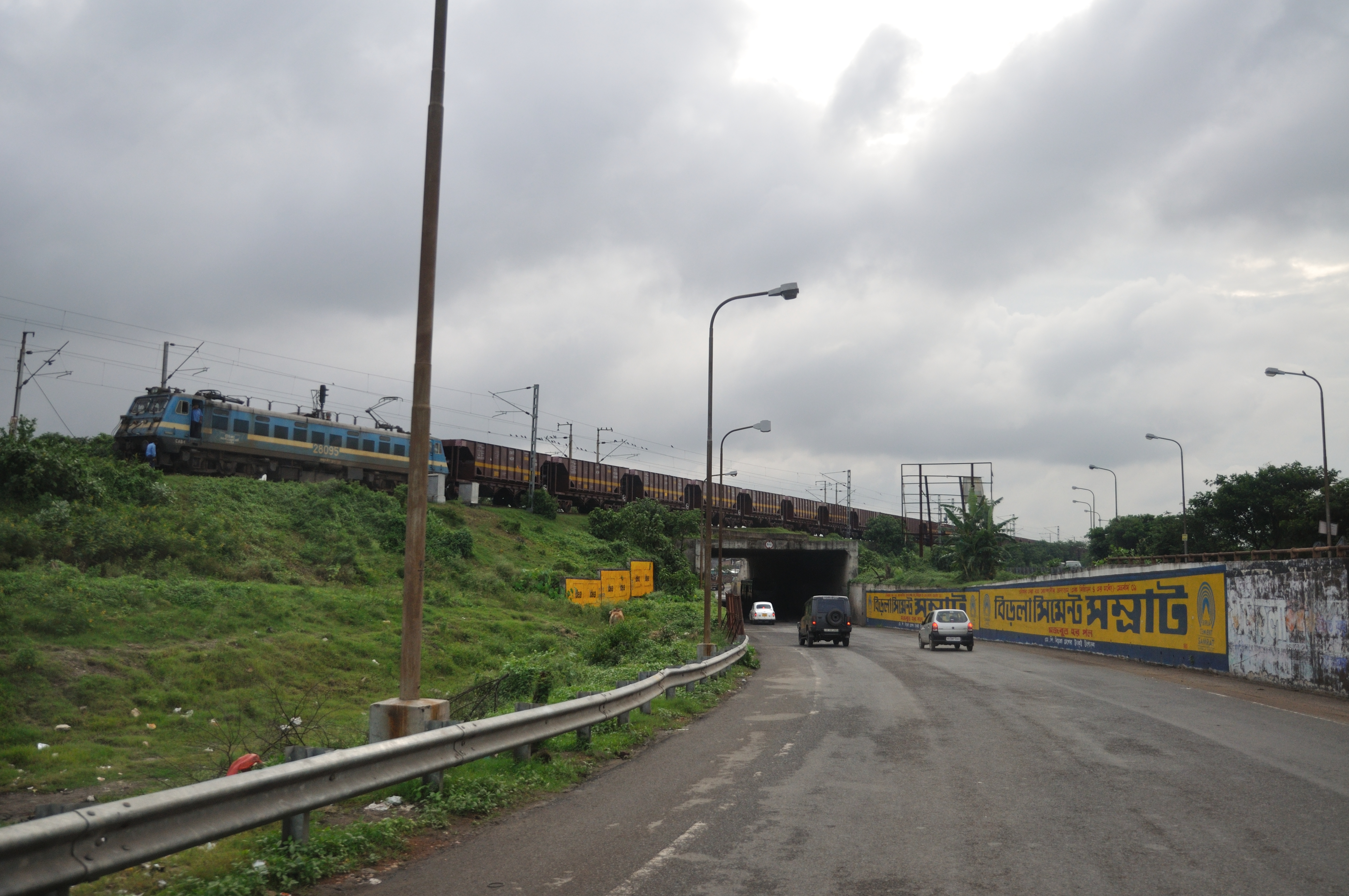
Belghoria Expressway beside railway station

The station complex is clean overall, and there are porters/escalators and food available. Excellent transport systems is available as well–Belghoria Expressway is beside the station and Barrackpore Trunk Road is under the station. A lodging systems and railfanning systems are also available in the station complex.

== Electrification ==
The Sealdah–Dankuni sector was electrified in 1964–65.

== Connections ==
The station is connected with Baranagar metro station of the Blue Line and Pink Line of Kolkata Metro,Barrackpore Trunk Road, Belghoria Expressway, and Gopal Lal Thakur Road. Various buses serve the station.

Several auto services are also available on Barrackpore Trunk Road towards Sodepur, Dakshineswar, Sinthee, and Baranagar Bazar.

== See also ==
- List of railway stations in India
