= Pink Line (Kolkata Metro) =

Transit line in Kolkata, India

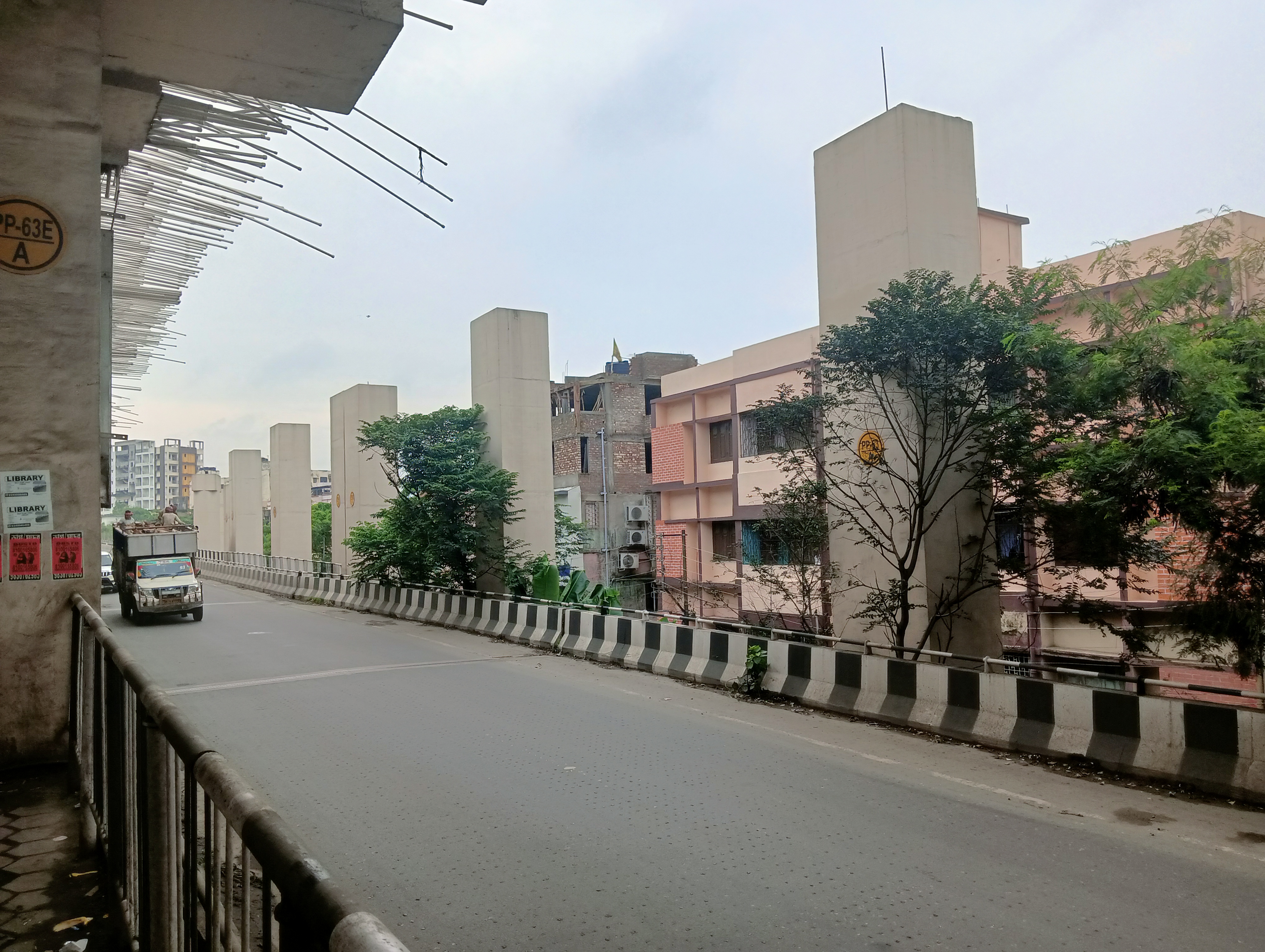
- Kolkata Metro Pink line pillars, under construction

Overview
- Status: Planned but construction not started
- Owner: Indian Railways
- Locale: Kolkata Metropolitan Region, India
- Termini: Baranagar (south); Barrackpore (north)
- Connecting lines: Blue Line
- Stations: 11
- Website: Indian Railways

Service
- Type: Rapid transit
- System: Kolkata Metro
- Operator: Metro Railway, Kolkata
- Depot: Noapara Depot

Technical
- Line length: 12.50 kilometres (7.77 mi)
- Number of tracks: 2
- Character: Elevated
- Track gauge: 5 ft 6 in (1,676 mm) broad gauge
- Electrification: 750 V DC using third rail
- Operating speed: 80 km/h (designed)
Route Map
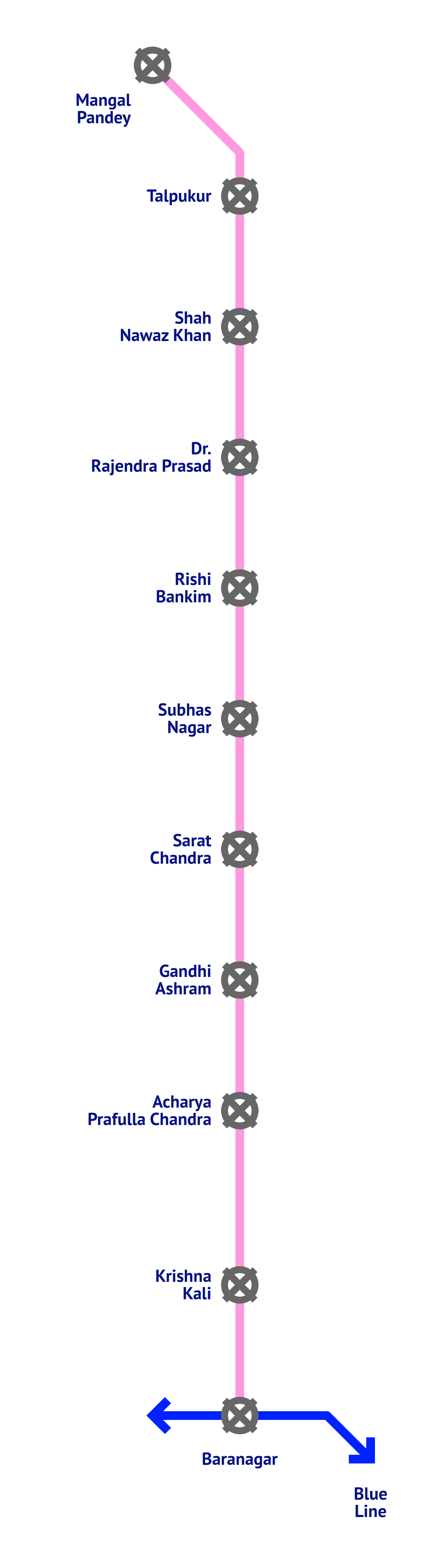

Pink Line is a planned rapid transit metro line of the Kolkata Metro in Kolkata, West Bengal, India. The line will run from Baranagar to Barrackpore,(with a proposed extension to Kalyani to cater AIIMS Kalyani and IISER Kolkata) with a length of 12.50 km (7.77 mi). It was sanctioned in 2009, at a cost of Rs.2070 crore, to enable a quicker commuter service from the northern suburbs to Kolkata.

After proposal in 2009, there were problems related to construction due to the presence of arterial water pipelines, that supply water from Tala tank to Palta, below Barrackpore Trunk Road (or BT Road). Later, objections came from Kolkata Municipal Corporation (KMC) under Trinamool Congress rule, causing a postponement of this route. In 2026, after the Bharatiya Janata Party came to power in West Bengal, talks were resumed, followed by a No-Objection Certificate from KMC for realignment of pipelines under BT Road.

== Route ==
=== Stations (South to North) ===
The stations in this line are:

Pink Line
| # | Station Name | | Distance [KM] | Opening | Connections | Layout | Platform type |
| # | English | Bengali | Distance [KM] | Opening | Connections | Layout | Platform type |
|---|---|---|---|---|---|---|---|
| 1 | Baranagar | বরাহনগর | 0 | Approved | Blue Line; Baranagar Road | Elevated | Side |
| 2 | Krishna Kali (Kamarhati) | কৃষ্ণ কলি | 1.2 | Approved | | Elevated | To be decided |
| 3 | Acharya Prafulla Chandra (Agarpara) | আচার্য প্রফুল্ল চন্দ্র | 1.6 | Approved | | Elevated | To be decided |
| 4 | Gandhi Ashram (Sodepur) | গান্ধী আশ্রম | 1.4 | Approved | | Elevated | To be decided |
| 5 | Sarat Chandra (Panihati) | শরৎ চন্দ্র | 1.2 | Approved | | Elevated | To be decided |
| 6 | Subhas Nagar (Sukchar) | সুভাষ নগর | 1.1 | Approved | | Elevated | To be decided |
| 7 | Rishi Bankim (Khardaha) | ঋষি বঙ্কিম | 1.4 | Approved | | Elevated | To be decided |
| 8 | Dr. Rajendra Prasad (Tatagate) | ড. রাজেন্দ্র প্রসাদ | 0.9 | Approved | | Elevated | To be decided |
| 9 | Shah Nawaz Khan (Titagarh) | শাহ নওয়াজ খান | 1.3 | Approved | | Elevated | To be decided |
| 10 | Anukul Thakur (Talpukur) | অনূকুল ঠাকুর | 1.3 | Approved | | Elevated | To be decided |
| 11 | Mangal Pandey (Barrackpore) | মঙ্গল পাণ্ডে | 1 | Approved | Barrackpore | Elevated | To be decided |

== Proposed realignment ==
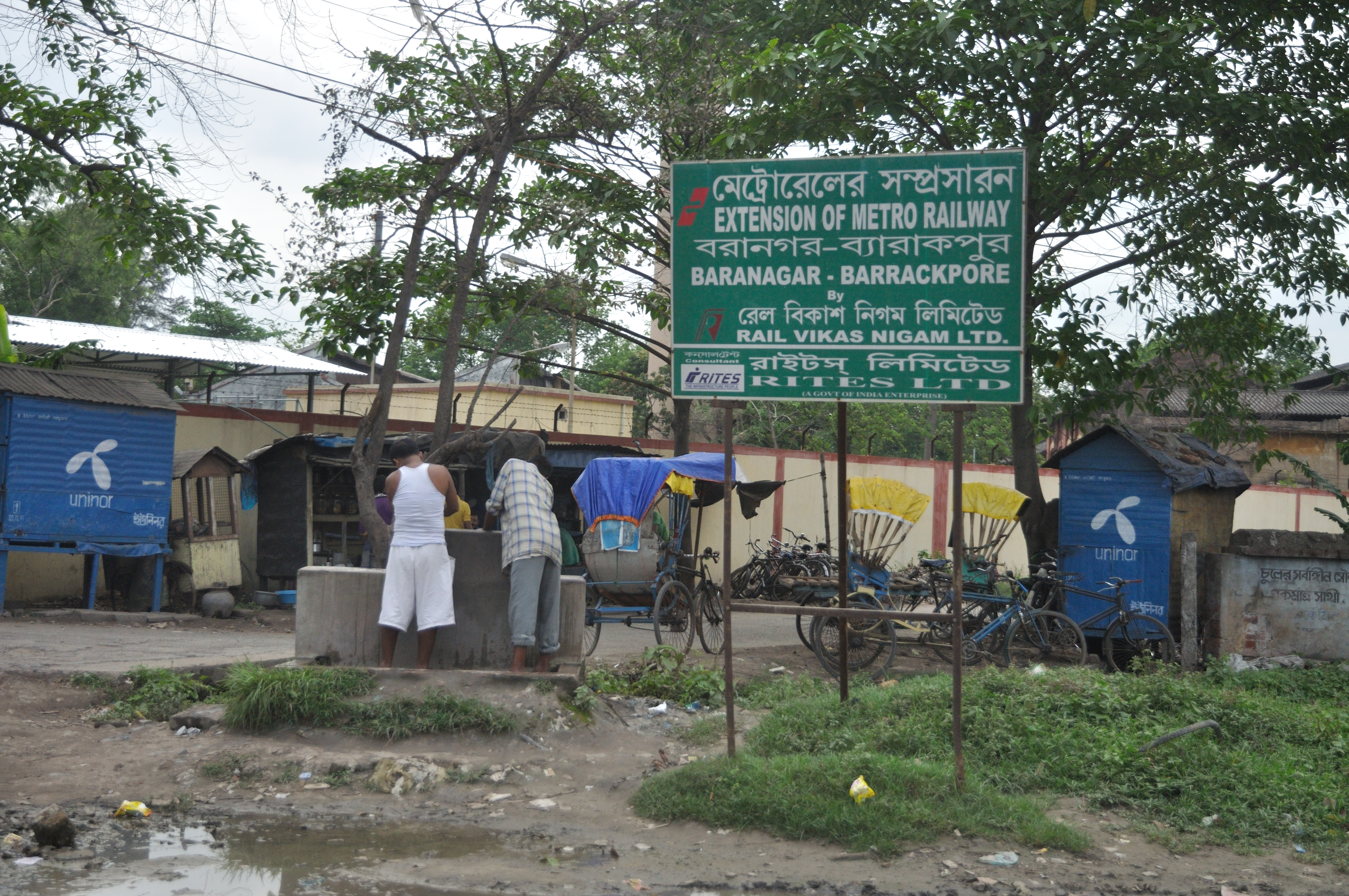
Kolkata Metro Pink Line Signage

State government proposed for realigning the line via Kalyani Expressway, instead of B.T. Road, due to the presence of arterial water pipelines, that supply water to the city, below BT Road. The construction might create huge traffic jam along the road and also damage the water pipelines, which will cutoff the city's water supply. This will increase the length to 17 km (10.56 mi). . This proposal is not feasible as fresh sanctioned from rail way board was required . It would provide the eassy movement to the residents near by BT Road which is huge traffic congesent . There are 6 nos pipe lines of 64'', 72'', 42'',60'' 48'' & 62'' diameter have been laid in the year 2012, 1957–61, 1868–84, 1922–36, 1888-93 1971-96 respectively. Arrangement of pipe lines are east to west sidesunder BT road. ROW of BT Road is average 40–42 m. KMC'S Engineers views that constructions of central pier system metro stations like others metro cities is possible. on diverting the flow of existing 48'', 60'', & 42'' pipelines on laying one by one new pipe line.

Accordingly Project implemeting agency RVNL has submitted the revised sequence of construction as under .

1. Laying an additional 60 inches diameter pipe line between Baranagar (Dunlop Bridge) to Barrackpore (Chiriamore) and installation of connection of newly laid 60 inch diameter (MS welded pipe line by Micro Tunneling Method) with existing old 60 inch diameter pipe line and existing 48 inch diameter old pipe line by means of butterfly valve arrangement after taking shut down in stages to suit the site requirements.

2. On diverting flow of existing 48 inches pipeline through the newly laid 60 inches pipe line, the work along this pipe line (Casting of pile and realignment of 48 inches pipe line by DI pipe) will be taken up.

3. On completing the mentioned work along existing 48 inches pipeline, the flow of this pipe line will be restored as earlier and the flow of existing 60 inches pipeline will be diverted through the newly laid 60 inches diameter pipe line to defunct this pipe line. The casting of pipe, pile cap and other structural work will be taken up along this 60 inches diameter pipeline on defunct condition without disturbing the 42 inch diameter pipe line as it is not infringing / influencing Metro construction and installation. It is also proposed that the entire work will be done in two phase ie. 1st phase Baranagar to Gandhi Ashram Metro station and 2nd phase remaining portion.

== Current Status ==
Recently Kolkata Municipal Corporation had given a NOC for the removal of the 48-inch diameter water transmission line from under the high density BT road along with the realignment of pipe line. Also a tender had been floated by RVNL for the construction of this corridor with 10 stations and viaduct with a tender closing date of 26 September 2026.

== See also ==
- List of Kolkata Metro stations
- Kolkata Metro rolling stock
- Lists of rapid transit systems
- Trams in Kolkata
- Kolkata Light Rail Transit
- Kolkata Monorail
- Kolkata Suburban Railway
