= Telenipara =

- Census Town
- Location in West Bengal, India Telenipara (India)
- Coordinates: 22.77867°N 88.41562°E
- Country: India
- State: West Bengal
- District: North 24 Parganas

Area
  - Total: 7.81 km^{2} (3.02 sq mi)

Population (2011)
  - Total: 17,781
  - Density: 2,280/km^{2} (5,900/sq mi)

Languages
  - Official: Bengali, English
- Time zone: UTC+5:30 (IST)
- PIN: 700121
- Telephone code: +91 33
- Vehicle registration: WB
- Lok Sabha constituency: Barrackpore
- Vidhan Sabha constituency: Noapara
- Website: north24parganas.nic.in

Telenipara is a census town in Barrackpore II CD Block in Barrackpore subdivision of North 24 Parganas district in the state of West Bengal, India.

== Geography ==
Cities and towns in the northern portion of Barrackpore subdivision in North 24 Parganas district
M: municipal city/ town, CT: census town,
N: neighbourhood, OG: outgrowth
Owing to space constraints in the small map, the actual locations in a larger map may vary slightly

=== Location ===
Babanpur, Jafarpur, Mohanpur and Telenipara form a cluster of census towns around Barrackpore.

96% of the population of Barrackpore subdivision (partly presented in the map alongside) live in urban areas. In 2011, it had a density of population of 10,967 per km^{2}. The subdivision has 16 municipalities and 24 census towns.

For most of the cities/ towns information regarding density of population is available in the Infobox. Population data is not available for neighbourhoods. It is available for the entire Municipal area and thereafter ward-wise.

All places marked on the map are linked in the full-screen map.

=== Police station ===
Khardaha police station under Barrackpore Police Commissionerate has jurisdiction over Khardaha Municipal area and Barrackpore II CD Block.

=== Post Office ===
Sewli Teilinipara has a delivery sub post office, with PIN 700121 in the North Presidency Division of North 24 Parganas district in Calcutta region. Other post offices with the same PIN are Nilganj Bazaar, Beraberia and Suryapur.

== Demographics ==
As per the 2011 Census of India, Telenipara had a total population of 17,781, of which 9,124 (51%) were males and 8,657 (49%) were females. Population below 6 years was 1,714. The total number of literates in Telenipara was 13,813 (85.97% of the population over 6 years).

== Infrastructure ==
As per the District Census Handbook 2011, Telenipara covered an area of 7.8086 km^{2}. Amongst the medical facilities it had were 5 medicine shops, Amongst the educational facilities it had were 11 primary schools, 5 middle schools, 5 secondary schools and 4 senior secondary schools. The nearest degree college was available 4 km away at Barrackpore.

== Transport ==
Telenipara is located on the Barrackpore-Barasat Road (part of State Highway 2).

=== Bus ===
==== Private Bus ====
- 81 Barasat - Barrackpore Fishery Gate
- 81/1 Barasat - Rajchandrapur

==== WBTC Bus ====
- C29 Barasat - Barrackpore Court
- E32 Nilganj - Howrah Station
- S11 Nilganj - Esplanade
- S34B Barasat State University - Barrackpore Court
- AC10 Nilganj - Howrah Station

=== Train ===
The nearest railway stations are Barasat Junction railway station on the Sealdah-Bangaon line and Barrackpore railway station on the Sealdah-Ranaghat line.

== Education ==
P.N. Das College at Palta is located nearby.
