= Chak Kanthalia =

- Census Town
- Location in West Bengal, India Chak Kanthalia (India)
- Coordinates: 22.754694°N 88.395694°E
- Country: India
- State: West Bengal
- District: North 24 Parganas

Area
  - Total: 0.71 km^{2} (0.27 sq mi)

Population (2011)
  - Total: 11,108
  - Density: 16,000/km^{2} (41,000/sq mi)

Languages
  - Official: Bengali, English
- Time zone: UTC+5:30 (IST)
- PIN: 700121
- Telephone code: +91 33
- Vehicle registration: WB
- Lok Sabha constituency: Barrackpore
- Vidhan Sabha constituency: Noapara
- Website: north24parganas.nic.in

Chak Kanthalia is a census town in Barrackpore II CD Block in Barrackpore subdivision of North 24 Parganas district in the state of West Bengal, India.

== Geography ==
Cities and towns in the southern portion of Barrackpore subdivision in North 24 Parganas district
M: municipal city/ town, CT: census town,
N: neighbourhood/ administrative location
Owing to space constraints in the small map, the actual locations in a larger map may vary slightly

=== Location ===
Chak Kanthalia, Ruiya, Patulia and Bandipur form a cluster of census towns around Titagarh/ Khardaha. Karna Madhabpur, with the CD Block headquarters, is also located nearby.

96% of the population of Barrackpore subdivision (partly presented in the map alongside, all places marked on the map are linked in the full screen map) lives in urban areas. In 2011, it had a density of population of 10,967 per km^{2}. The subdivision has 16 municipalities and 24 census towns.

For most of the cities/ towns information regarding density of population is available in the Infobox. Population data is not available for neighbourhoods. It is available for the entire Municipal area and thereafter ward-wise.

=== Police station ===
Khardaha police station under Barrackpore Police Commissionerate has jurisdiction over Khardaha Municipal area and Barrackpore II CD Block.

== Demographics ==
As per the 2011 Census of India, Chak Kanthalia had a total population of 11,108, of which 5,704 (51%) were males and 5,404 (49%) were females. Population below 6 years was 1,023. The total number of literates in Chak Kanthalia was 8,722 (86.48% of the population over 6 years).

== Infrastructure ==
As per the District Census Handbook 2011, Chak Kanthalia covered an area of 0.7108 km^{2}. Amongst the medical facilities it had were 7 medicine shops. Amongst the medical facilities it had were 1 primary school and 1 middle school. The nearest secondary and senior secondary schools were available 3 km away at Senri.

== Transport ==
Kalyani Expressway runs through Chak Kanthalia.

=== WBTC Bus ===
- AC10 Nilganj - Howrah Station

=== Train ===
Barrackpore railway station and Titagarh railway station on the Sealdah-Ranaghat line are located nearby.

== Education ==
P.N. Das College at Palta is located nearby.

== Healthcare ==
Block Primary Health Centre at Bandipur is located nearby.
