= Mohanpur, North 24 Parganas =

Mohanpur
- Census Town
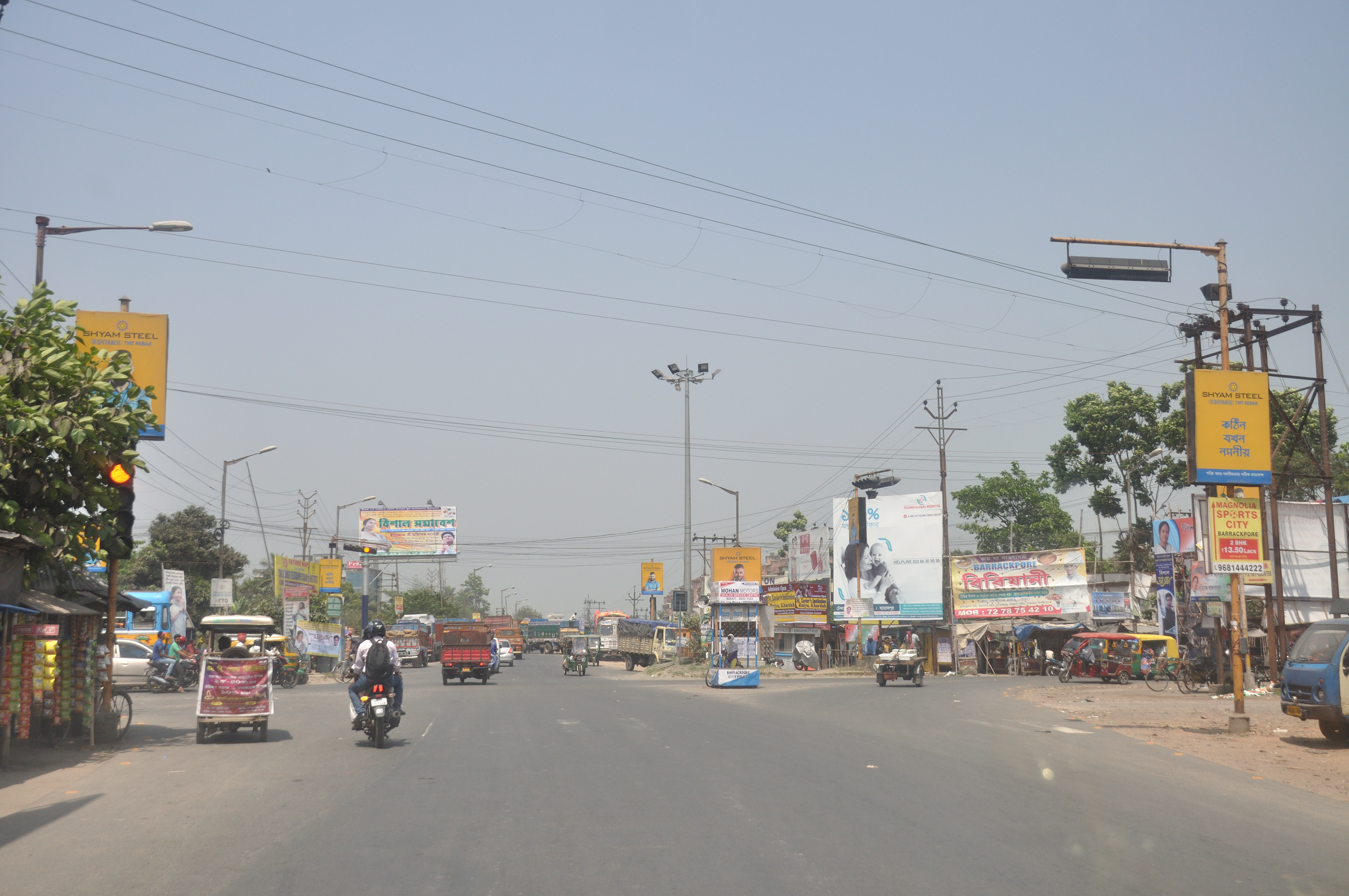
- Wireless More, Mohanpur

- Location in West Bengal, India Mohanpur (India)
- Coordinates: 22.77297°N 88.39562°E
- Country: India
- State: West Bengal
- District: North 24 Parganas

Area
  - Total: 1.45 km^{2} (0.56 sq mi)

Population (2011)
  - Total: 9,096
  - Density: 6,270/km^{2} (16,200/sq mi)

Languages
  - Official: Bengali, English
- Time zone: UTC+5:30 (IST)
- PIN: 700122
- Telephone code: +91 33
- Vehicle registration: WB
- Lok Sabha constituency: Barrackpore
- Vidhan Sabha constituency: Noapara
- Website: north24parganas.nic.in

Mohanpur is a census town in Barrackpore II CD Block in Barrackpore subdivision of North 24 Parganas district in the state of West Bengal, India.

== Geography ==
Cities and towns in the northern portion of Barrackpore subdivision in North 24 Parganas district
M: municipal city/ town, CT: census town,
N: neighbourhood, OG: outgrowth
Owing to space constraints in the small map, the actual locations in a larger map may vary slightly

=== Location ===
Babanpur, Jafarpur, Mohanpur and Telenipara form a cluster of census towns around Barrackpore.

96% of the population of Barrackpore subdivision (partly presented in the map alongside) live in urban areas. In 2011, it had a density of population of 10,967 per km^{2}. The subdivision has 16 municipalities and 24 census towns.

For most of the cities/ towns information regarding density of population is available in the Infobox. Population data is not available for neighbourhoods. It is available for the entire Municipal area and thereafter ward-wise.

All places marked on the map are linked in the full-screen map.

=== Police station ===
Khardaha police station under Barrackpore Police Commissionerate has jurisdiction over Khardaha Municipal area and Barrackpore II CD Block.

== Demographics ==
As per the 2011 Census of India, Mohanpur had a total population of 9,096, of which 4,646 (51%) were males and 4,450 (49%) were females. Population below 6 years was 699. The total number of literates in Mohanpur was 7,712 (91.84% of the population over 6 years).

== Infrastructure ==
As per the District Census Handbook 2011, Mohanpur covered an area of 1.4463 km^{2}. Amongst the medical facilities it had were a mobile health clinic and 6 medicine shops. Amongst the educational facilities It had were 3 primary schools, the nearest middle and secondary schools were available 1 km away at Jafarpur and the nearest senior secondary school was available 1.5 km away at Santinagar.

== Transport ==
Mohanpur is located beside the junction (Wireless More) of the Barrackpore-Barasat Road (part of State Highway 2) and the Kalyani Expressway.

=== Bus ===
==== Private Bus ====
- 81 Barasat - Barrackpore Fishery Gate
- 81/1 Barasat - Rajchandrapur

==== WBTC Bus ====
- C29 Barasat - Barrackpore Court
- E32 Nilganj - Howrah Station
- S11 Nilganj - Esplanade
- S34B Barasat State University - Barrackpore Court
- AC10 Nilganj - Howrah Station

=== Train ===
The nearest railway stations are Barasat Junction railway station on the Sealdah-Bangaon line and Barrackpore railway station on the Sealdah-Ranaghat line.

== Education ==
DAV Public School, Barrackpore, was started in 2011. The school presently has around 800 students. It is located beside Kalyani Expressway at Mohanpur.
