= Bandipur (disambiguation) =

Bandipur is a hill top settlement and municipality in Nepal. It may also refer to:

- Bandipur National Park in Karnataka, India
- Bandipur, North 24 Parganas, a census town in Barrackpore II CD Block, North 24 Parganas district, West Bengal, India
- An alternative spelling of Bandipore, a town and district in India's Union Territory of Jammu and Kashmir
