= Babanpur =

- Census Town
- Location in West Bengal, India Babanpur (India)
- Coordinates: 22.78897°N 88.38962°E
- Country: India
- State: West Bengal
- District: North 24 Parganas

Area
  - Total: 1.43 km^{2} (0.55 sq mi)

Population (2011)
  - Total: 8,942
  - Density: 6,250/km^{2} (16,200/sq mi)

Languages
  - Official: Bengali, English
- Time zone: UTC+5:30 (IST)
- PIN: 743144
- Telephone code: +91 33
- Vehicle registration: WB
- Lok Sabha constituency: Barrackpore
- Vidhan Sabha constituency: Noapara
- Website: north24parganas.nic.in

Babanpur is a census town in Barrackpore II CD Block in Barrackpore subdivision of North 24 Parganas district in the state of West Bengal, India.

== Geography ==
Cities and towns in the northern portion of Barrackpore subdivision in North 24 Parganas district
M: municipal city/ town, CT: census town,
N: neighbourhood, OG: outgrowth
Owing to space constraints in the small map, the actual locations in a larger map may vary slightly

=== Location ===
Babanpur, Jafarpur, Mohanpur and Telenipara form a cluster of census towns around Barrackpore.

96% of the population of Barrackpore subdivision (partly presented in the map alongside) live in urban areas. In 2011, it had a density of population of 10,967 per km^{2}. The subdivision has 16 municipalities and 24 census towns.

For most of the cities/ towns information regarding density of population is available in the Infobox. Population data is not available for neighbourhoods. It is available for the entire Municipal area and thereafter ward-wise.

All places marked on the map are linked in the full-screen map.

=== Police station ===
Khardaha police station under Barrackpore Police Commissionerate has jurisdiction over Khardaha Municipal area and Barrackpore II CD Block.

== Demographics ==
=== Population ===
As per the 2011 Census of India, Babanpur had a total population of 8,942, of which 4,555 (51%) were males and 4,387 (49%) were females. Population below 6 years was 877. The total number of literates in Babanpur was 6,953 (86.21% of the population over 6 years).

=== Kolkata Urban Agglomeration ===
The following Municipalities, Census Towns and other locations in Barrackpore subdivision were part of Kolkata Urban Agglomeration in the 2011 census: Kanchrapara (M), Jetia (CT), Halisahar (M), Balibhara (CT), Naihati (M), Bhatpara (M), Kaugachhi (CT), Garshyamnagar (CT), Garulia (M), Ichhapur Defence Estate (CT), North Barrackpur (M), Barrackpur Cantonment (CB), Barrackpore (M), Jafarpur (CT), Ruiya (CT), Titagarh (M), Khardaha (M), Bandipur (CT), Panihati (M), Muragachha (CT) New Barrackpore (M), Chandpur (CT), Talbandha (CT), Patulia (CT), Kamarhati (M), Baranagar (M), South Dumdum (M), North Dumdum (M), Dum Dum (M), Noapara (CT), Babanpur (CT), Teghari (CT), Nanna (OG), Chakla (OG), Srotribati (OG) and Panpur (OG).

== Infrastructure ==
As per the District Census Handbook 2011, Babanpur covered an area of 1.4261 km^{2}. Amongst the medical facilities it had were 2 charitable hospital/ nursing homes and 8 medicine shops. Amongst the educational facilities it had were 3 primary schools, and the nearest middle, secondary and senior secondary schools were available almost next door at Jafarpur (officially half a kilometre way).

== Transport ==
Babanpur is located on Kalyani Expressway.

Palta railway station on the Sealdah-Ranaghat line is located nearby.
