= Karna Madhabpur =

- Village
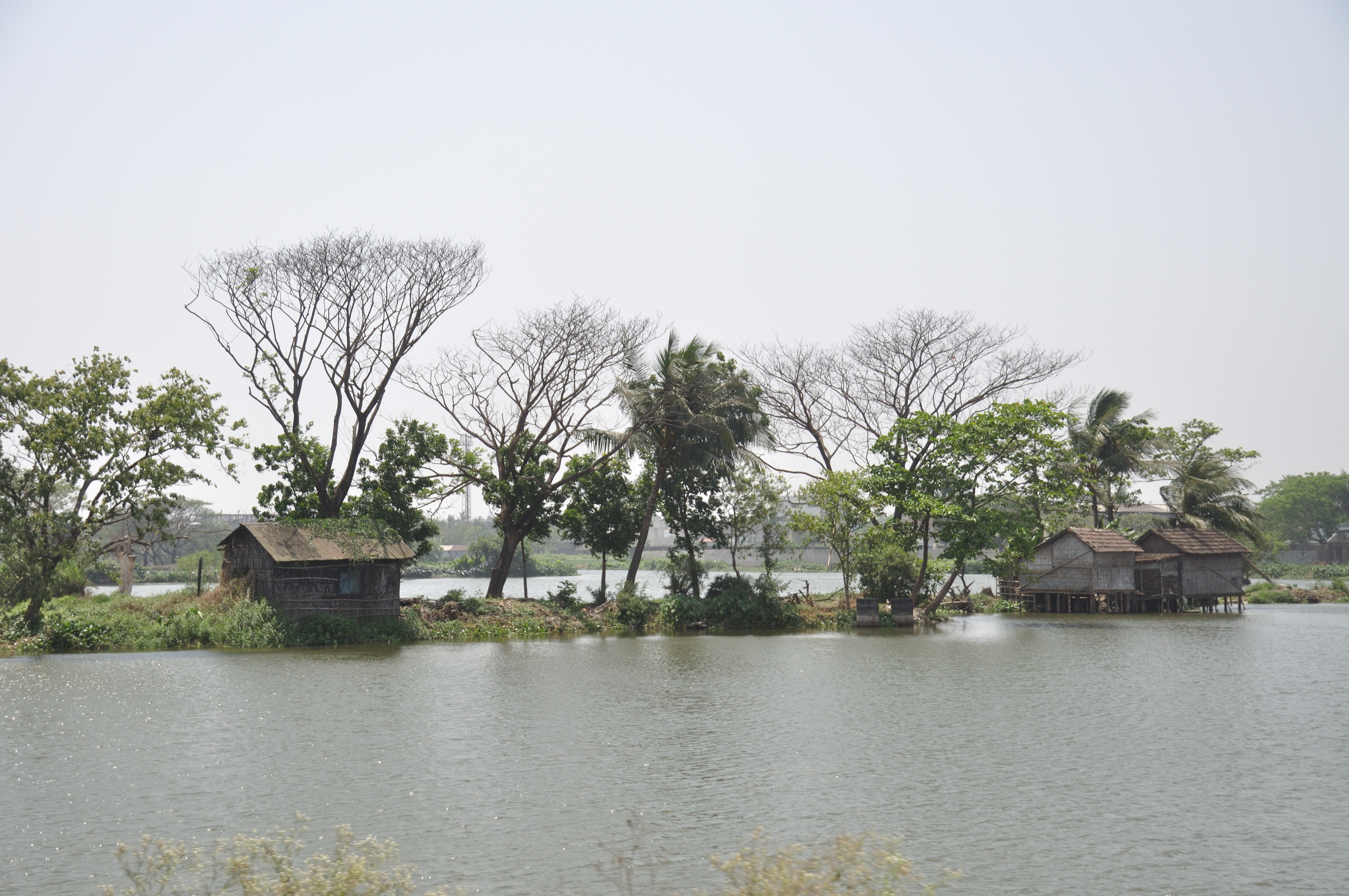
- Karna Madhabpur Wetland

- Location in West Bengal, India Karna Madhabpur (India)
- Coordinates: 22.7252°N 88.4135°E
- Country: India
- State: West Bengal
- District: North 24 Parganas

Population (2011)
  - Total: 3,088

Languages
  - Official: Bengali, English
- Time zone: UTC+5:30 (IST)
- PIN: 700113
- Telephone/STD code: 033
- Lok Sabha constituency: Dum Dum
- Vidhan Sabha constituency: Khardaha
- Website: north24parganas.nic.in

Karna Madhabpur is a village in Barrackpore II CD Block in Barrackpore subdivision of North 24 Parganas district in the state of West Bengal, India.

== Geography ==
Cities and towns in the southern portion of Barrackpore subdivision in North 24 Parganas district
M: municipal city/ town, CT: census town,
N: neighbourhood/ administrative location
Owing to space constraints in the small map, the actual locations in a larger map may vary slightly

=== Location ===
Khardaha, Bandipur, Bilkanda and Nilganj are located nearby.

96% of the population of Barrackpore subdivision (partly presented in the map alongside, all places marked in the map is linked in the full screen map) lives in urban areas. In 2011, it had a density of population of 10,967 per km^{2}. The subdivision has 16 municipalities and 24 census towns.

For most of the cities/ towns information regarding density of population is available in the Infobox. Population data is not available for neighbourhoods. It is available for the entire Municipal area and thereafter ward-wise.

=== Police station ===
Khardaha police station under Barrackpore Police Commissionerate has jurisdiction over Khardaha Municipal area and Barrackpore II CD Block.

=== CD Block HQ ===
The headquarters of Barrackpore II CD Block is at Karna Madhabpur.

== Demographics ==
As per the 2011 Census of India, Karna Madhabpur had a total population of 3,088, of which 1,592 (52%) were males and 1,496 (48%) were females. Population below 6 years was 321. The total number of literates in Karna Madhabpur was 2,313 (83.59% of the population over 6 years).

== Transport ==
Kalyani Expressway runs through Karna Madhabpur.

=== Bus ===
==== Private Bus ====
- 56 Ruiya Purbapara - Howrah Station

==== WBTC Bus ====
- AC10 Nilganj - Howrah Station

=== Train ===
Both Sodepur railway station and Khardaha railway station on the Sealdah-Ranaghat line are located nearby.

== Education ==
Elitte Institute of Engineering and Management was established at PO Karna Madhabpur in 2009. It offers diploma (3-years) courses in automobile, civil, electronics & telecommunication, electrical and mechanical engineering, computer science & technology, and hotel management & catering technology.

== Healthcare ==
Block Primary Health Centre at Bandipur is located nearby.
