= St. Mary's Technical Campus Kolkata =

Engineering college in West Bengal, India

- SMTCK
- Motto: Knowledge, Wisdom and Truth
- Type: Private Engineering Institute
- Established: 2011; 15 years ago
- Founder: K.V.K. Rao
- Accreditation: Approvals
- Academic affiliations: St. Mary's Group of Institutions; Maulana Abul Kalam Azad University of Technology
- Campus Head: Suneel Chinnakandukuri
- Academic staff: c. 100
- Students: c. 1800
- Location: Opposite West Bengal State University Saibona, Barasat Kolkata, West Bengal, 700 126, India; 22.7441671°N 88.4276214°E
- Campus: Urban, 25 acres (0.10 km^{2}) of land
- Website: stmaryskolkata.com
- Location within West Bengal Location within India

The St. Mary's Technical Campus Kolkata or, popularly known as SMTCK is a private engineering college in West Bengal, India, situated in Barrackpore-Barasat Road, Kolkata, located in Saibona Village, Nilganj, Kolkata, 700120. The college is affiliated to Moulana Abul Kalam Azad University of Technology (MAKAUT) and is approved by AICTE and UGC. It is one of the nine colleges under the St. Mary's Group of Institutions, a Christian Minority Educational society. It has over 17,00 students from 29 states of India and 25 countries.

== Location ==
SMTCK is located by the Barrackpore–Barasat road, and is 15 km (9.3 mi) from the city of Barrackpore. The nearest railway station is at Barrackpore and Barasat, while the nearest airport is Netaji Subhash Chandra Bose International Airport at Dum Dum, Kolkata.

== Campus ==
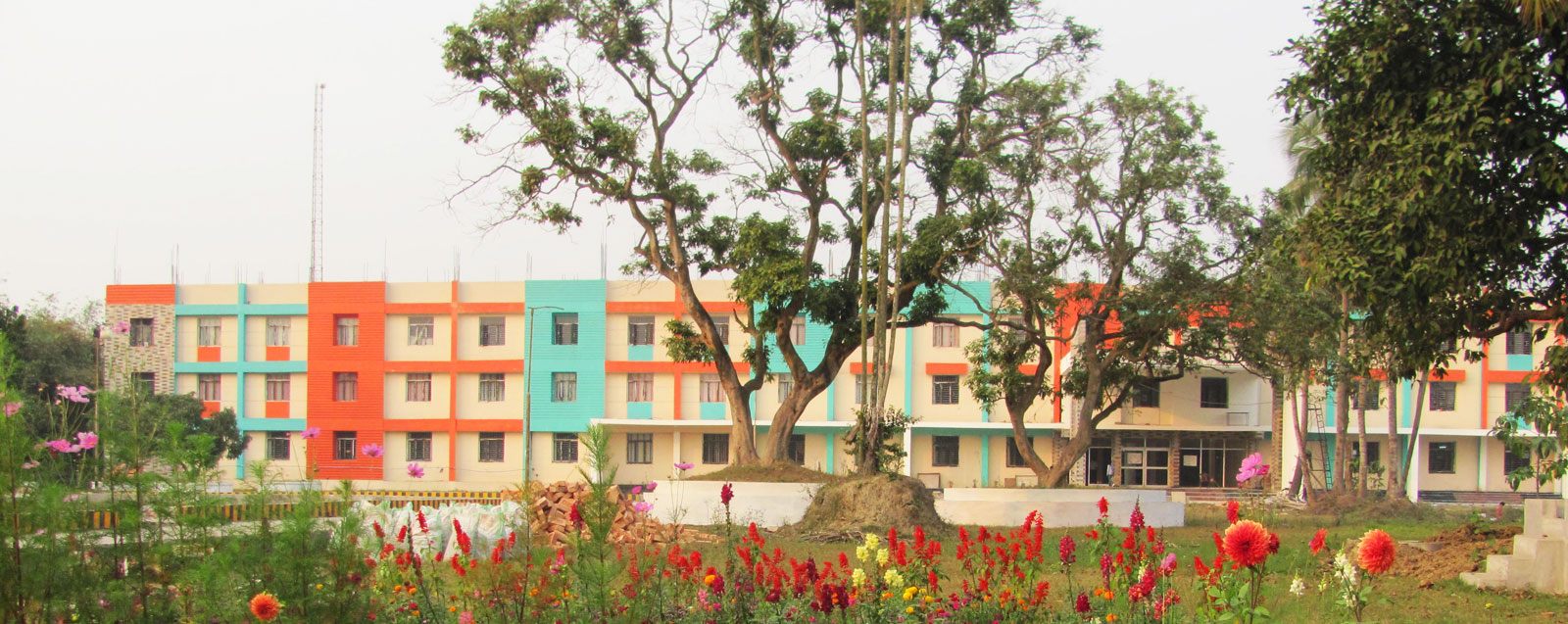
B.Tech Building of St. Mary's Technical Campus Kolkata

The institute has the following main buildings:

- The Central Block or the B.Tech. building houses the engineering departments
- The MCA Block houses the Master of Computer Application department
- The MBA Block houses the Master of Business Administration department

Other than this, SMTCK offers internet connectivity at its browsing center, has six computer labs with high speed internet and an AutoCAD lab, with Wi-Fi facility, spread across the campus. It has two Seminar hall and also has an Indoor Stadium for cultural activities.

== Academics ==
St. Mary's Technical Campus Kolkata offers one undergraduate program (B.Tech.) and also offers three post graduation programs (MBA). All courses are approved by the All India Council for Technical Education AICTE, Government of India and the Department of Higher Education, Government of West Bengal. The institute has an educational tie up with Osmania University, according to which students of the institute can use some facilities of the university. Admission to the undergraduate B.Tech. courses is done through the West Bengal Joint Entrance Examination (WBJEE) and JEE Mains, while The Management Education Center offers Master of Business Administration (MBA) degree as a full-time two-year course at the graduate level.

== Departments ==
Engineering departments

Sl	Department
1	Civil Engineering
2	Artificial Intelligence and Data Science
3	Computer Science and Engineering (Data Science)
4	Computer Science and Engineering (Artificial Ingtelligence and Machine Learning)
5	Hospitality and Tourism Administration

Non-engineering departments

Sl	Department
2	Master of Business Administration (MBA)

== Training and placements ==
There are regular interactive workshops, seminars and short-term courses goes on every month. Many core companies like Kyzen which are basically IT companies, visit the college along with IT companies. The placement of B.Tech. in Computer Science and Engineering is best currently,

== Hostels and cafeteria ==
SMTCK is a fully residential campus. There are three boys hostel and one girls hostel, both inside the SMTCK campus, each equipped with high-speed Internet access and Wi-Fi, with guest rooms also available for visitor.

== Student life ==
=== Activities ===
Provisions have been made for extracurricular activities and games and sports on the hostels premises, in other locations within the campus. It has a football and a cricket playground. Besides these, students, faculty and staff have facilities for football and volleyball. Every year, cricket, kabaddi, volleyball, football and badminton tournaments are conducted within the campus for students' leisure.

=== Annual festival ===
Marythesis is the annual cultural festival of St. Mary's Technical Campus Kolkata. It was started in 2011 by the first batch of the college i.e., the M.C.A. batch and is generally held for two days and two nights. Many renowned artists and Rock Music Bands like Anupam Roy, Underground Authority, The SPUNK!, Ginger Feet etc. have performed in Marythesis.

== See also ==
- List of institutions of higher education in West Bengal
- Education in India
- Education in West Bengal
