= Bandipur, North 24 Parganas =

Bandipur
- Census Town
- Location in West Bengal, India Bandipur (India)
- Coordinates: 22.7357°N 88.3957°E
- Country: India
- State: West Bengal
- District: North 24 Parganas

Area
  - Total: 0.83 km^{2} (0.32 sq mi)

Population (2011)
  - Total: 8,115
  - Density: 9,800/km^{2} (25,000/sq mi)

Languages
  - Official: Bengali, English
- Time zone: UTC+5:30 (IST)
- PIN: 700118, 700119
- Telephone code: +91 33
- Vehicle registration: WB
- Lok Sabha constituency: Dum Dum
- Vidhan Sabha constituency: Khardaha
- Website: north24parganas.nic.in

Bandipur is a census town in Barrackpore II CD Block in Barrackpore subdivision of North 24 Parganas district in the state of West Bengal, India.

== Geography ==
Cities and towns in the southern portion of Barrackpore subdivision in North 24 Parganas district
M: municipal city/ town, CT: census town,
N: neighbourhood/ administrative location
Owing to space constraints in the small map, the actual locations in a larger map may vary slightly

=== Location ===
Chak Kanthalia, Ruiya, Patulia and Bandipur form a cluster of census towns around Titagarh/ Khardaha. Karna Madhabpur, with the CD Block headquarters, and Nilganj are located nearby.

96% of the population of Barrackpore subdivision (partly presented in the map alongside, the places marked on the map are linked in full screen map) lives in urban areas. In 2011, it had a density of population of 10,967 per km^{2}. The subdivision has 16 municipalities and 24 census towns.

For most of the cities/ towns information regarding density of population is available in the Infobox. Population data is not available for neighbourhoods. It is available for the entire Municipal area and thereafter ward-wise.

=== Police station ===
Khardaha police station under Barrackpore Police Commissionerate has jurisdiction over Khardaha Municipal area and Barrackpore II CD Block.

=== Post Office ===
Bandipur has a delivery branch post office, with PIN 700119 in the North Presidency Division of North 24 Parganas district in Calcutta region. Other post offices with the same PIN are Bisalakshi Ghat, Titagarh, Bramhasthan and Patulia.

== Demographics ==
=== Population ===
As per the 2011 Census of India, Bandipur had a total population of 8,115, of which 4,118 (52%) were males and 3,927 (48%) were females. Population below 6 years was 905. The total number of literates in Bandipur was 5,611 (77.82% of the population over 6 years).

=== Kolkata Urban Agglomeration ===
The following Municipalities, Census Towns and other locations in Barrackpore subdivision were part of Kolkata Urban Agglomeration in the 2011 census: Kanchrapara (M), Jetia (CT), Halisahar (M), Balibhara (CT), Naihati (M), Bhatpara (M), Kaugachhi (CT), Garshyamnagar (CT), Garulia (M), Ichhapur Defence Estate (CT), North Barrackpur (M), Barrackpur Cantonment (CB), Barrackpore (M), Jafarpur (CT), Ruiya (CT), Titagarh (M), Khardaha (M), Bandipur (CT), Panihati (M), Muragachha (CT) New Barrackpore (M), Chandpur (CT), Talbandha (CT), Patulia (CT), Kamarhati (M), Baranagar (M), South Dumdum (M), North Dumdum (M), Dum Dum (M), Noapara (CT), Babanpur (CT), Teghari (CT), Nanna (OG), Chakla (OG), Srotribati (OG) and Panpur (OG).

== Infrastructure ==
As per the District Census Handbook 2011, Bandipur covered an area of 0.83 km^{2}. Amongst the medical facilities it has a dispensary/ primary health centre, a family welfare centre, a maternity home and a medicine shop. Amongst the educational facilities it has 3 primary schools. The nearest middle, secondary and senior secondary schools are available almost next door at Rahara (officially 0.5 km away). The nearest degree college is available within 1.5 km at Khardah (Ramkrishna Mission V.C.College).

== Transport ==
Bandipur is a little away from Kalyani Expressway and is linked to the latter by short local roads.

Titagarh railway station and Khardaha railway station on the Sealdah-Ranaghat line are located nearby.

== Healthcare ==
Bandipur Block Primary Health Centre, with 15 beds, is the main medical facility in Barracpore II CD Block. There are primary health centres at Muragachha (Bilkanda (Tegharia) PHC with 6 beds) and Sultanpur (with 6 beds).
