= Nilganj =

- Village
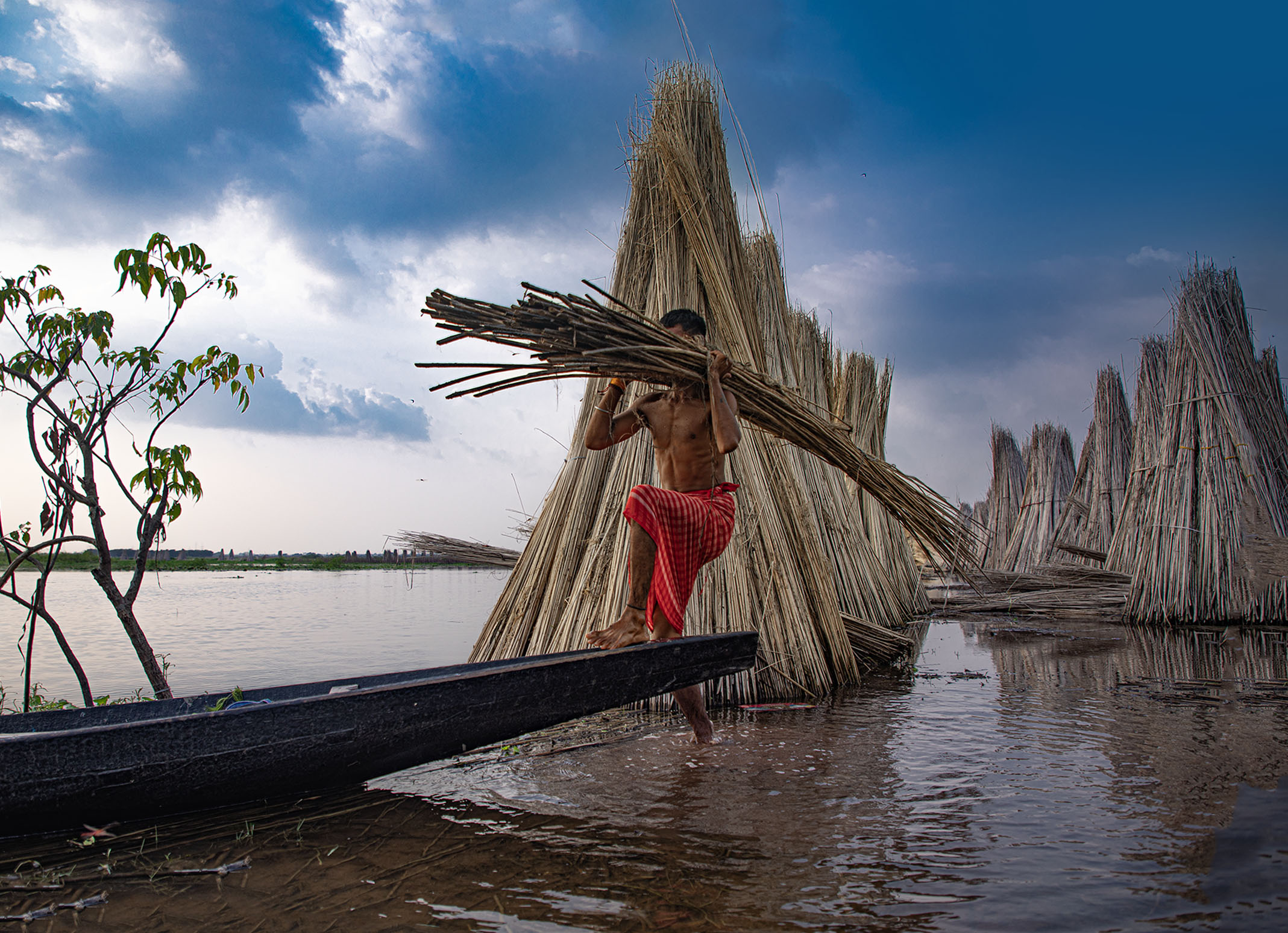

- Location in West Bengal, India Nilganj (India)
- Coordinates: 22.76117°N 88.42462°E
- Country: India
- State: West Bengal
- District: North 24 Parganas

Population (2011)
  - Total: 2,662

Languages
  - Official: Bengali, English
- Time zone: UTC+5:30 (IST)
- PIN: 700121
- Telephone/STD code: +91 33
- Lok Sabha constituency: Barrackpore
- Vidhan Sabha constituency: Noapara
- Website: north24parganas.nic.in

Nilganj is a village in Barrackpore II CD Block in Barrackpore subdivision of North 24 Parganas district in West Bengal, India.

== Geography ==
Cities and towns in the southern portion of Barrackpore subdivision in North 24 Parganas district
M: municipal city/ town, CT: census town,
N: neighbourhood/ administrative location
Owing to space constraints in the small map, the actual locations in a larger map may vary slightly

=== Location ===
Chak Kanthalia, Ruiya, Patulia and Bandipur form a cluster of census towns around Titagarh/ Khardaha. Karna Madhabpur, with the CD Block headquarters, is located nearby.

=== Police station ===
Khardaha police station under Barrackpore Police Commissionerate has jurisdiction over Khardaha Municipal area and Barrackpore II CD Block.

== Demographics ==
As per the 2011 Census of India, Nilganje had a total population of 2,662, of which 1,381 (52%) were males and 1,281 (48%) were females. Population below 6 years was 225. The total number of literates in Nilganje was 2,049 (84.08% of the population over 6 years).

== Transport ==
Nilganj is located at the crossing of the Barrackpore-Barasat Road (part of State Highway 2) and the Nilganj Road.

=== Bus ===
==== WBTC Bus ====
- E32 Nilganj Depot - Howrah Station
- S11 Nilganj Depot - Esplanade
- C29 Barasat - Barrackpore Court
- DS-34 Barrackpore - Barasat

==== Private Bus ====
- 81 Barasat - Barrackpore Fishery Gate
- 81/1 Barasat - Rajchandrapur

=== Train ===
The nearest railway stations are Barasat Junction railway station on the Sealdah-Bangaon line and Barrackpore railway station on the Sealdah-Ranaghat line.

== Education ==
St. Mary's Technical Campus Kolkata, a private engineering college, was established at Saibona, near Nilganj, in 2011.
