= Khardaha =

- City
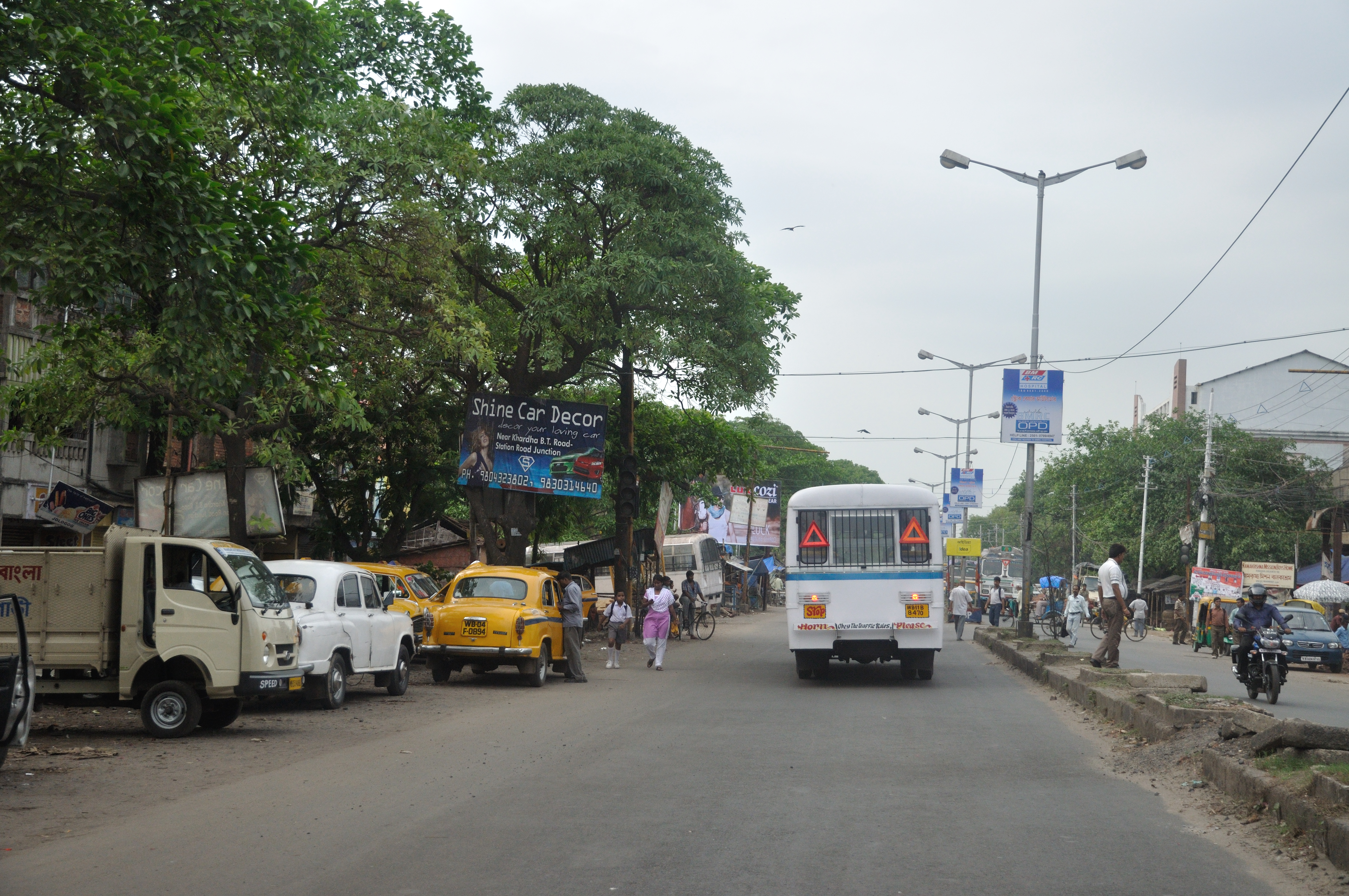
- B.T. Road in Khardaha

- Location in West Bengal, India Khardaha (India)
- Coordinates: 22.72°N 88.38°E
- Country: India
- State: West Bengal
- Division: Presidency
- District: North 24 Parganas

Government
  - Type: Municipality
  - Body: Khardaha Municipality
  - Chairman: Nilu Sarkar

Area
  - Total: 6.87 km^{2} (2.65 sq mi)
- Elevation: 15 m (49 ft)

Population (2011)
  - Total: 108,496
  - Density: 15,800/km^{2} (40,900/sq mi)

Languages
  - Official: Bengali, English
- Time zone: UTC+5:30 (IST)
- PIN: 700115, 700116, 700112, 700117, 700118
- Telephone code: +91 33
- Vehicle registration: WB
- Lok Sabha constituency: Dum Dum
- Vidhan Sabha constituency: Khardaha
- Website: khardahmunicipality.in

Khardaha is a city and a municipality of North 24 Parganas district in the Indian state of West Bengal. It is a part of the area covered by Kolkata Metropolitan Development Authority (KMDA).

== History ==
Initially Khardah was a part of South Barrackpore and West Barrackpore municipalities established in 1877. South Barrackpore Municipality was renamed Khardah Municipality in 1920.

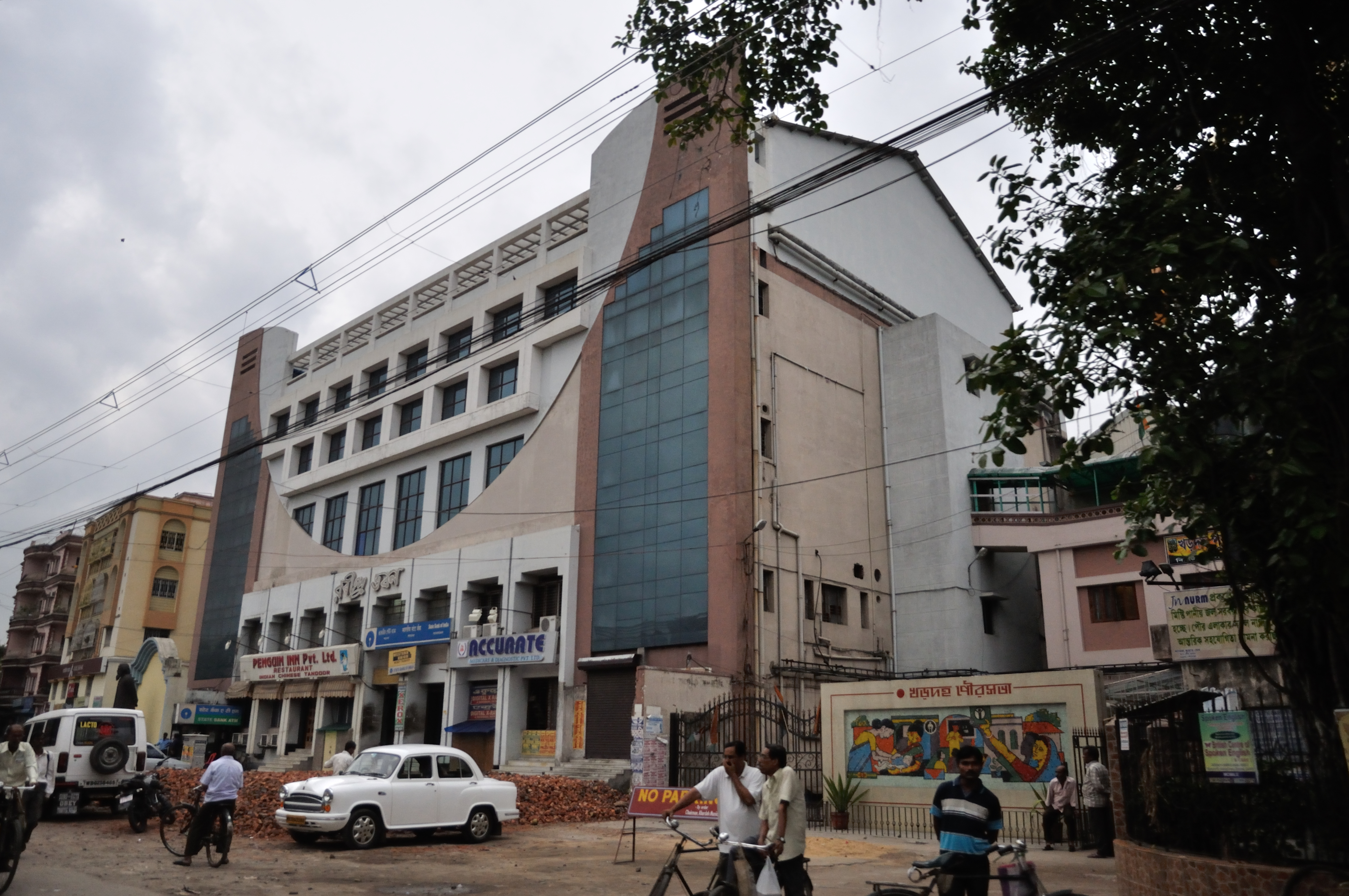
Khardah Municipality

== Geography ==
Cities and towns in the southern portion of Barrackpore subdivision in North 24 Parganas district
M: municipal city/ town, CT: census town,
N: neighbourhood/ administrative location
Owing to space constraints in the small map, the actual locations in a larger map may vary slightly

=== Location ===
Khardaha is located at 22.72°N 88.38°E. It has an average elevation of 15 m (49 ft). It has a railway station on the Sealdah-Ranaghat section, sandwiched between Sodepur and Sukchar (to the south) and Titagarh (to the north). The railway station divides the town into two parts – the eastern part is known as Rahara, while the western part is known as Khardaha.

Khardaha is bounded by Titagarh to the north, Patulia and Bandipur to the east, Panihati to the south and the Hooghly River to the west.

96% of the population of Barrackpore subdivision (partly presented in the map alongside, all places marked in the map are linked in the full screen map) lives in urban areas. In 2011, it had a density of population of 10,967 per km^{2}. The subdivision has 16 municipalities and 24 census towns.

== Demographics ==
=== Population ===
Historical population
Year	Pop.	±%
1921	5,486	—
1931	6,018	+9.7%
1941	9,568	+59.0%
1951	18,524	+93.6%
1961	28,362	+53.1%
1971	36,679	+29.3%
1981	50,202	+36.9%
1991	88,358	+76.0%
2001	122,133	+38.2%
2011	108,496	−11.2%
Source: Census of India

As per the 2011 Census of India, Khardaha had a total population of 108,496, of which 54,879 (51%) were male and 53,617 (49%) were female. 7,332 were under 6 years old. The total number of literates in Khardaha was 95,469 (94.37% of the population over 6 years).

As of the 2001 India census, Khardaha had a population of 116,252. Males constituted 53% of the population and females 47%. Khardaha had an average literacy rate of 81%, higher than the national average of 59.5%: male literacy was 83% and female literacy was 79%. 8% of the population was under 6 years old.

=== Kolkata Urban Agglomeration ===
The following Municipalities, Census Towns and other locations in Barrackpore subdivision were part of Kolkata Urban Agglomeration in the 2011 census: Kanchrapara (M), Jetia (CT), Halisahar (M), Balibhara (CT), Naihati (M), Bhatpara (M), Kaugachhi (CT), Garshyamnagar (CT), Garulia (M), Ichhapur Defence Estate (CT), North Barrackpur (M), Barrackpur Cantonment (CB), Barrackpore (M), Jafarpur (CT), Ruiya (CT), Titagarh (M), Khardaha (M), Bandipur (CT), Panihati (M), Muragachha (CT) New Barrackpore (M), Chandpur (CT), Talbandha (CT), Patulia (CT), Kamarhati (M), Baranagar (M), South Dumdum (M), North Dumdum (M), Dum Dum (M), Noapara (CT), Babanpur (CT), Teghari (CT), Nanna (OG), Chakla (OG), Srotribati (OG) and Panpur (OG).

=== Police station ===
Khardaha police station under Barrackpore Police Commissionerate has jurisdiction over Khardaha Municipal area and Barrackpore II CD Block.

== Infrastructure ==
As per the District Census Handbook 2011, Khardaha covered an area of 6.87 km^{2}, with both open and closed drains. It had 115 medicine shops, 37 primary schools, one middle school, 13 secondary/senior secondary schools and one college for arts/science/commerce, one orphanage home, one stadium, three cinemas, three public libraries and three reading rooms. It had 6 bank branches.

== Economy ==
=== Industry ===
Major industries in Khardaha are:

- Khardah Jute Mill was nationalised in 1980 and made a part of National Jute Manufactures Corporation Limited. It was closed in 2004 and after implementation of a revival scheme Khardah Jute Mill was reopened in 2011. The Union Cabinet, at a meeting held on 10 October 2018, chaired by Prime Minister Narendra Modi, gave the green signal for the closure of National Jute Manufacturers Corporation Ltd. (NJMC) along with its subsidiary Birds Jute and Exporters Ltd. (BJEL). NJMC had been incurring losses for several years and was under reference to BIFR since 1993. The Mills of NJMC which were proposed for revival, namely, Kinnison Mill at Titagarh, Khardah Mill at Khardah and RBHM Mill at Katihar were under suspension since August 2016.
- Electrosteel Castings Ltd. started manufacturing cast iron pipes at Khardaha in 1955, and evolved as a pioneer in ductile iron pipe manufacturing. It produces 280,000 tonnes of ductile iron pipes annually and exports over half of its production. At Khardaha it also produces ductile iron fittings (5,000 tonnes per annum) and 250,000 tonnes of pig iron annually for captive use. Umang Kejriwal and Mayank Kejriwal have been managing directors since 1979.
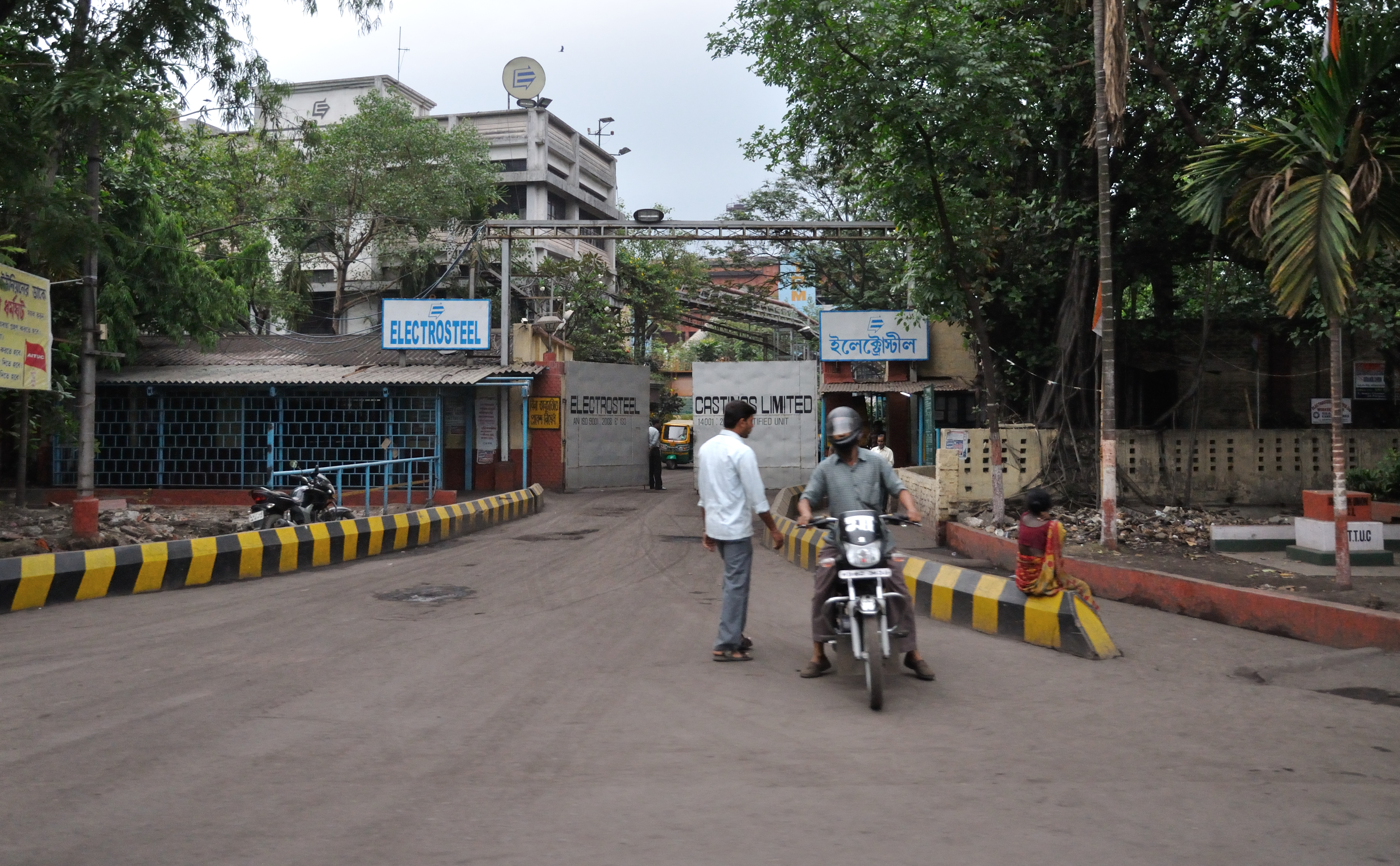
  Electrosteel

== Transport ==
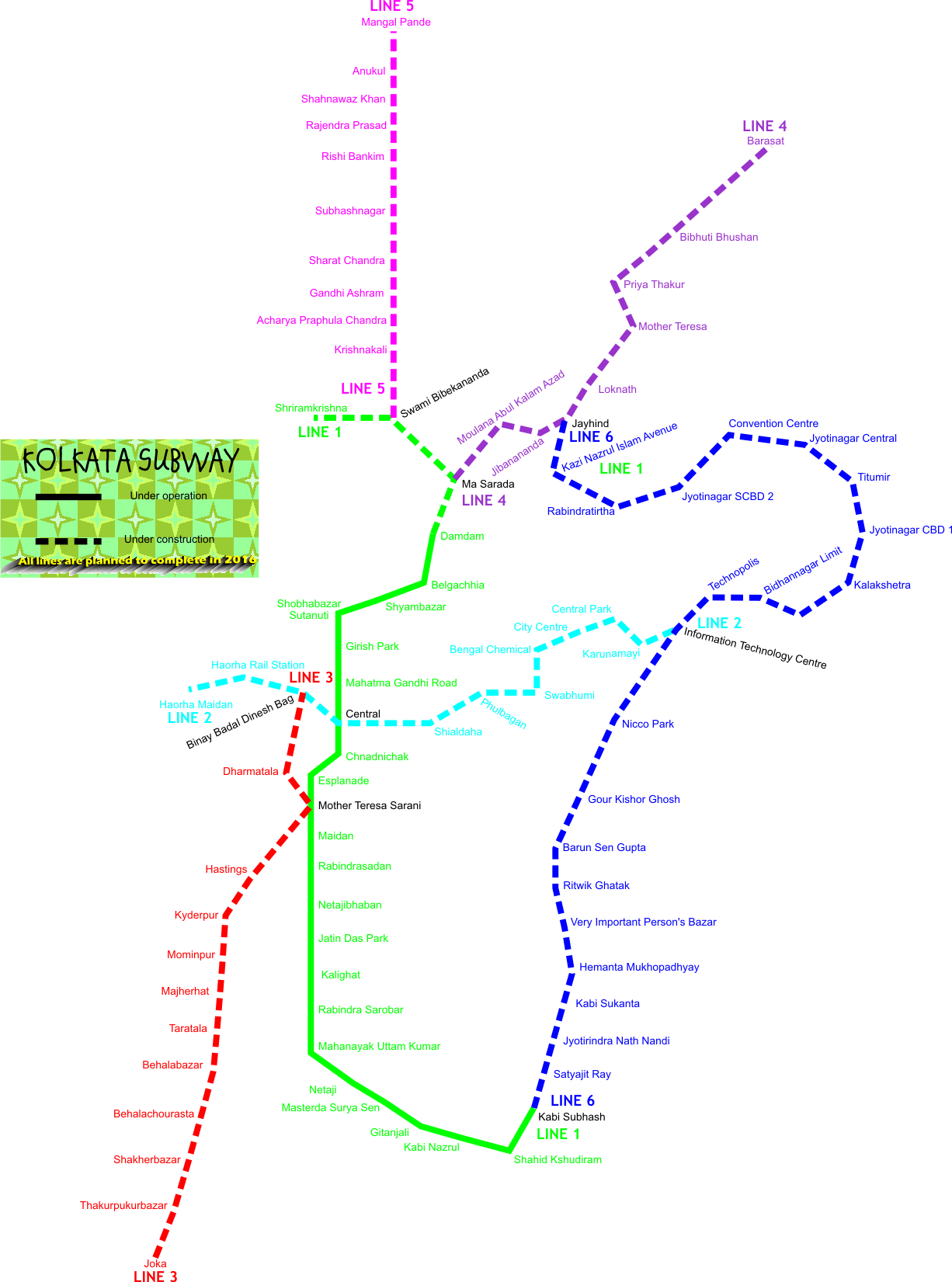
Kolkata new proposed Metro Pink Line (Baranagar - Barrackpore)

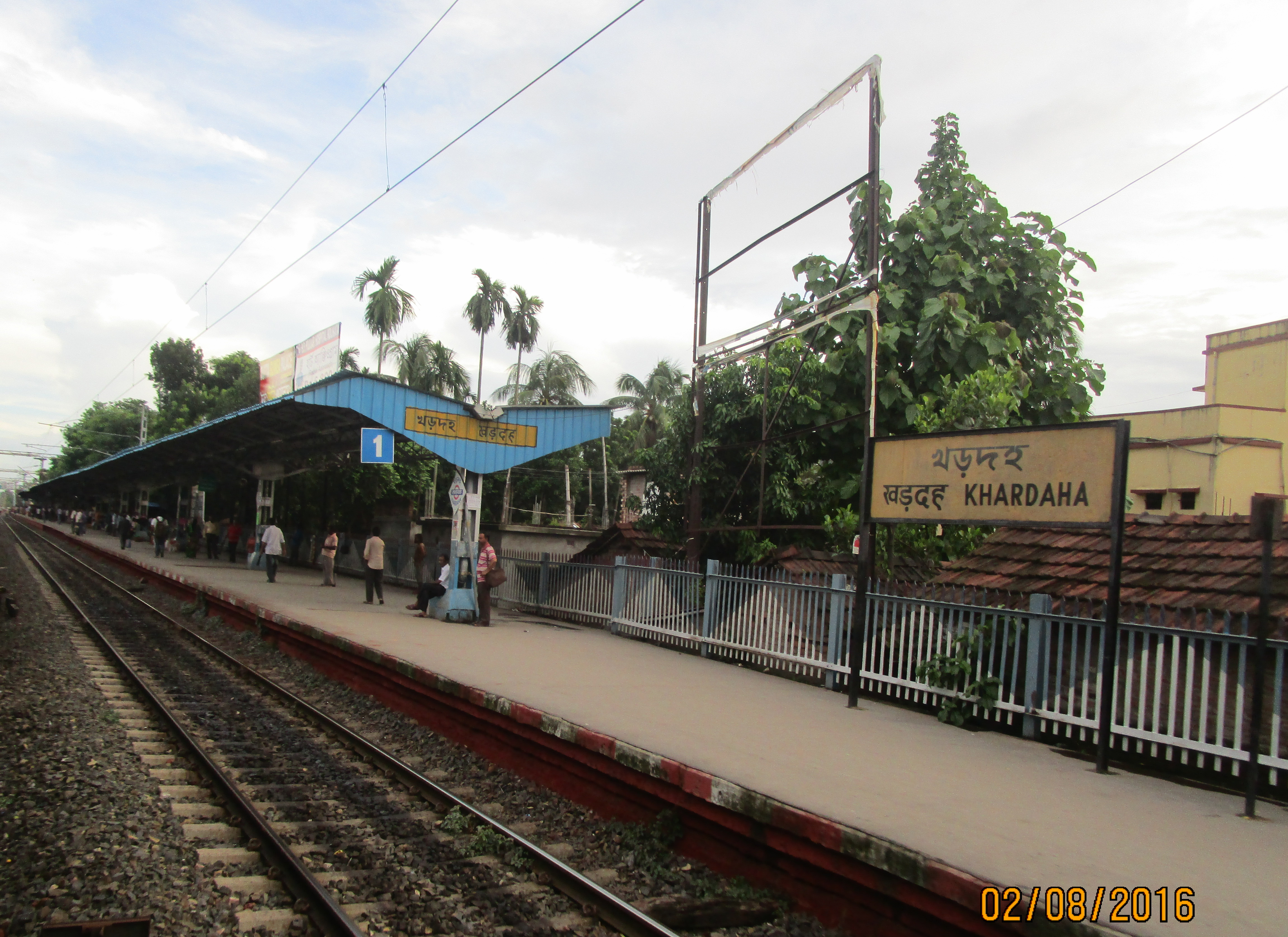
Khardaha railway station

B.T. Road passes through Khardaha.

78 is the most frequent bus in Khardaha which runs from Barrackpore Court to Esplanade. Besides many buses connect Khardaha to various neighbourhoods - 81/1 (Barasat to Rajchandrapur), C28 and S32 (Barrackpore Court to Howrah Station), S11 (Nilganj to Esplanade), E32 (Nilganj to Howrah Station) etc.

Khardaha railway station on the Sealdah-Ranaghat line is 18.5 km from Sealdah railway station. It is part of the Kolkata Suburban Railway system.

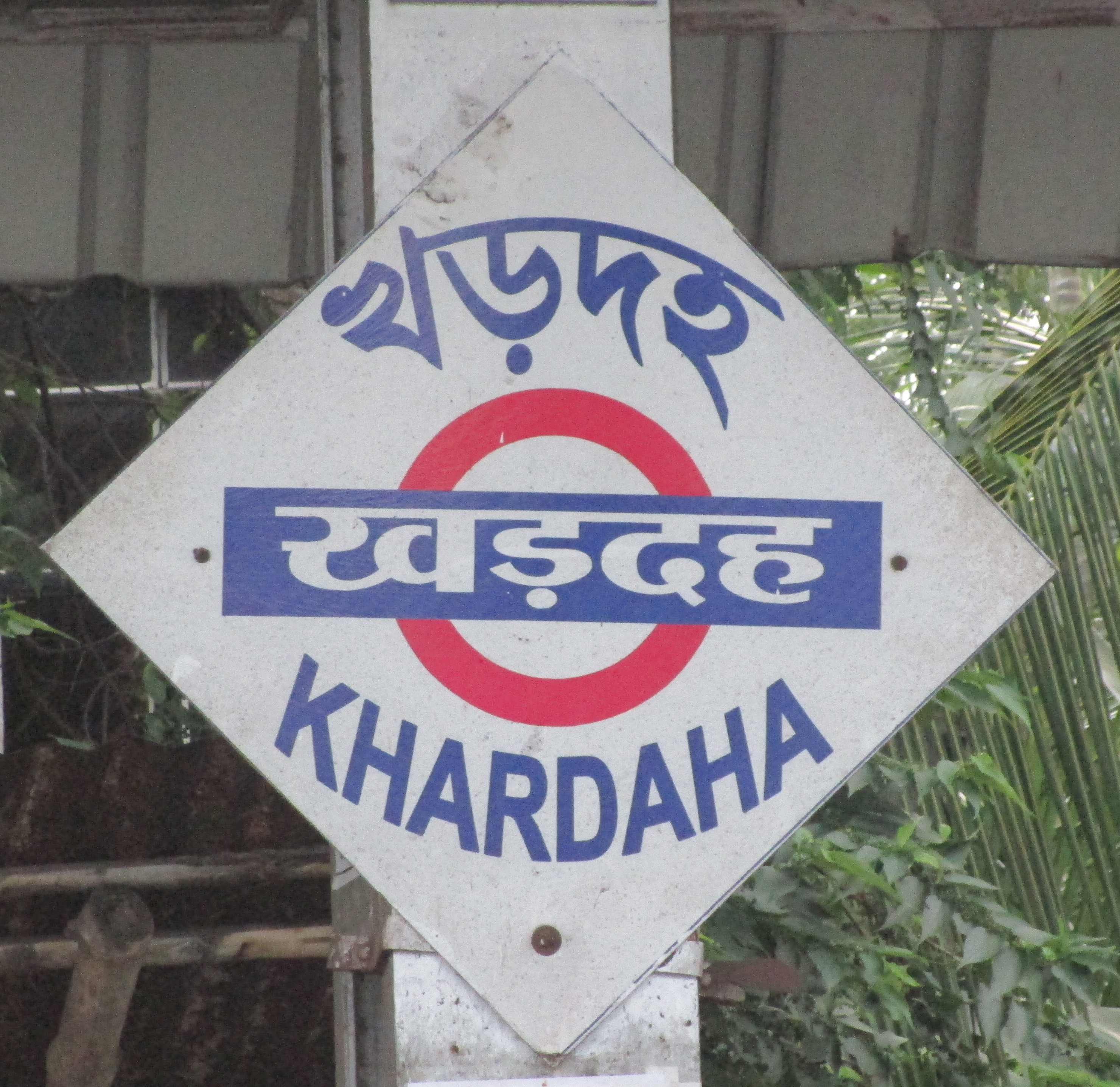

Shyamsundar ferry ghat is used by commuters to reach Rishra on the other side of Hooghly River. There is auto service available from station to ferry ghat. Ferry doesn't operate till late night.

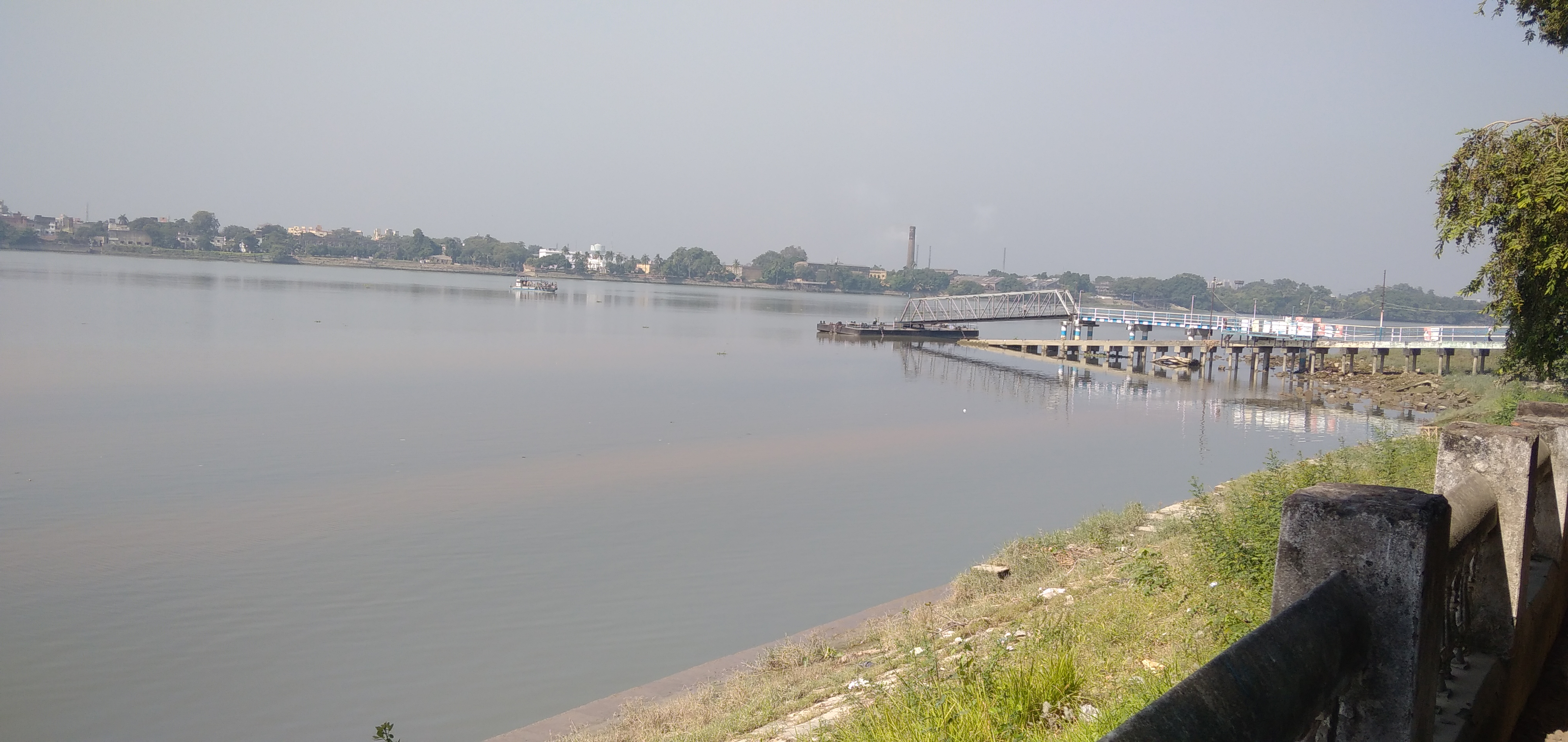
Khardah ShyamSundar Ferry Ghat

=== Commuters ===
Around a total of 3.2 million people from all around the city commute to Kolkata daily for work. In the Sealdah-Krishnanagar section there are 34 trains that carry commuters from 30 railway stations. In the Sealdah-Shantipur section 32 trains carry commuters from 29 stations.

== Education ==
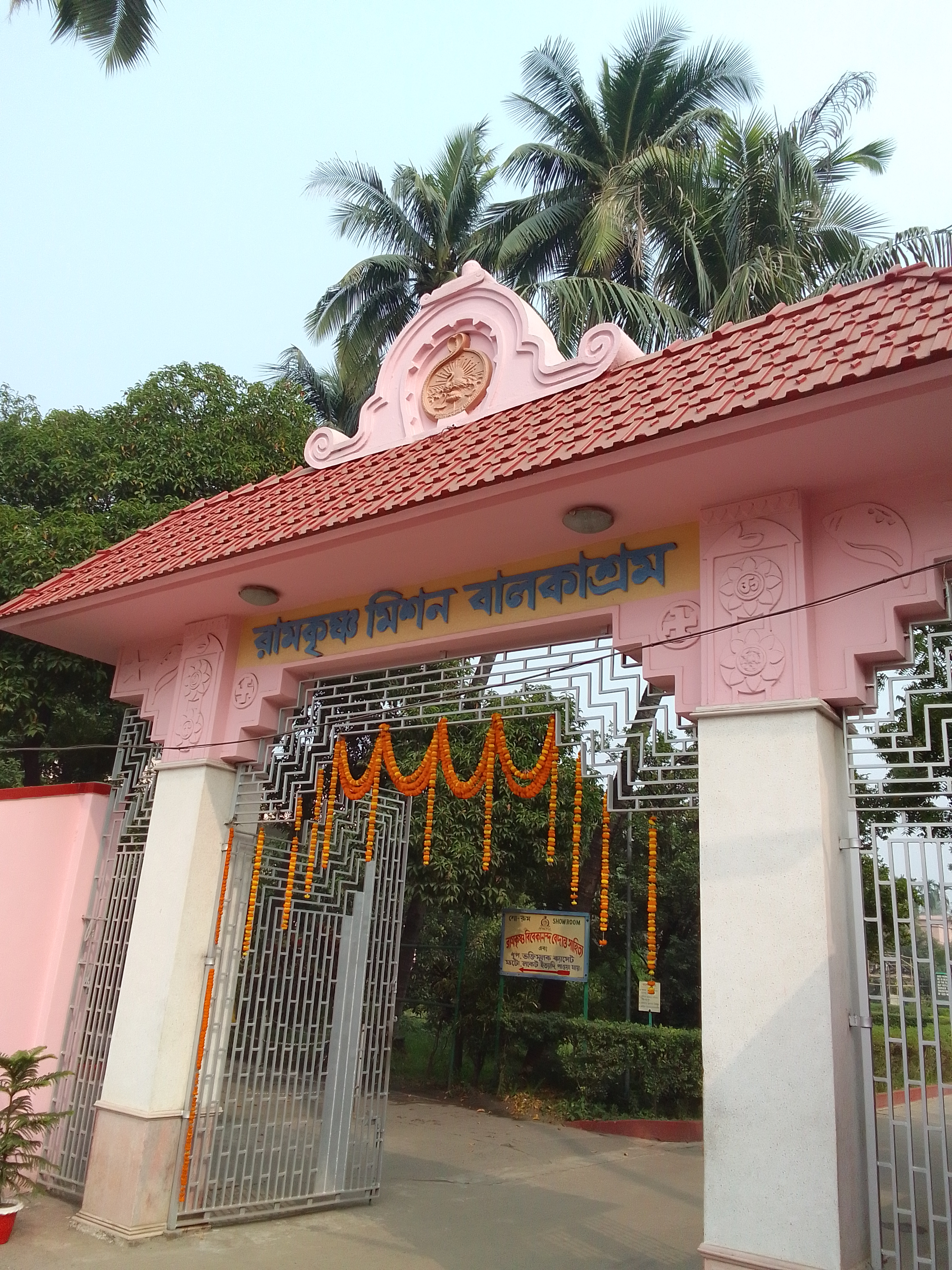
Entry gate to Rahara Ramakrishna Mission

Rahara Ramakrishna Mission Boys' Home High School has facilities for teaching from class 1 to 12 (Higher secondary) in both Bengali and English mediums. It is an all boys' school.

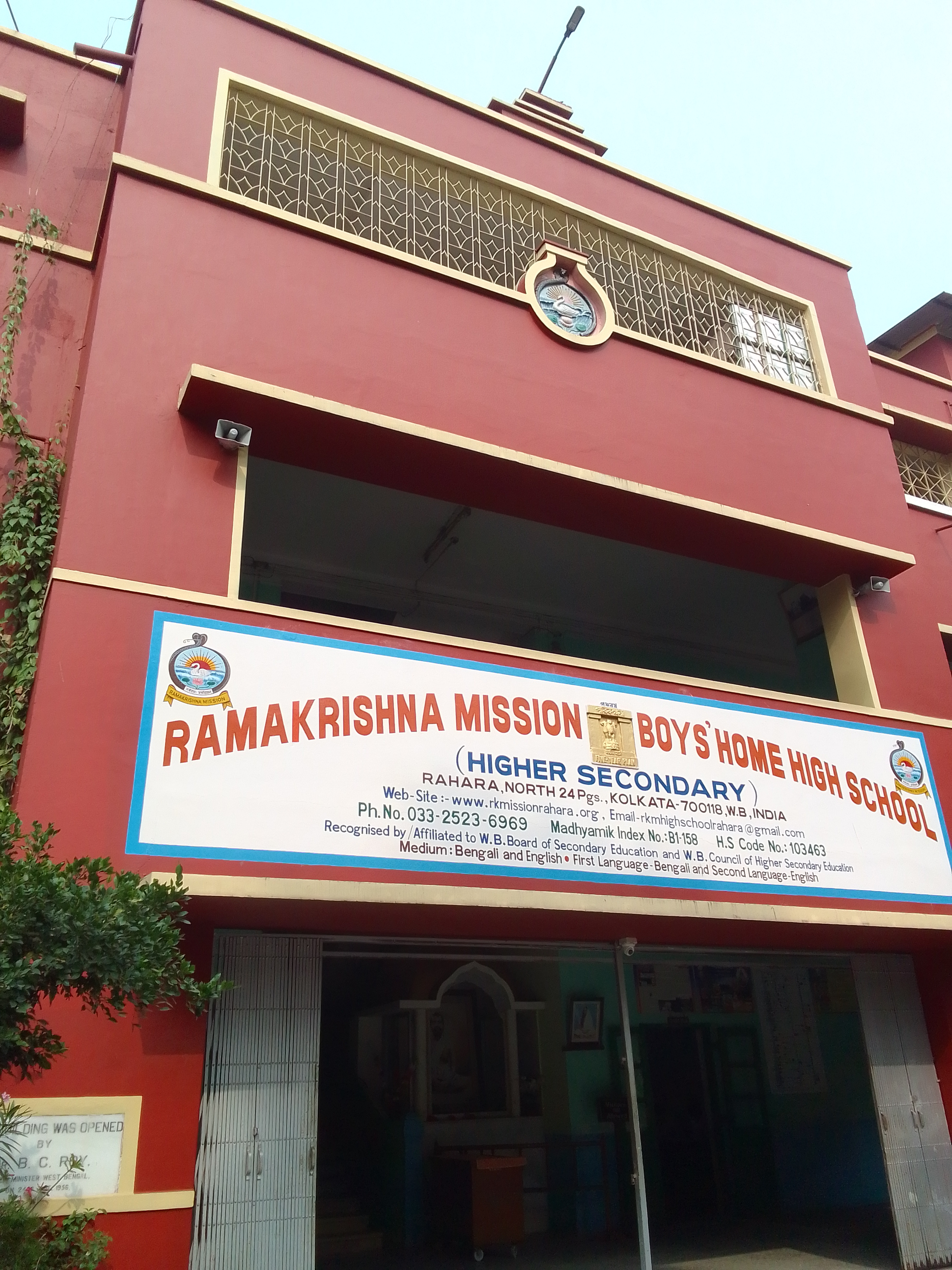
RK Mission Boys' Home High School

Khardaha also has an all boys' college which is called, Ramakrishna Mission Vivekananda Centenary College, a part of Ramakrishna Math and Mission. Both graduate and post graduate courses are taught. But, only Science subjects are offered here.

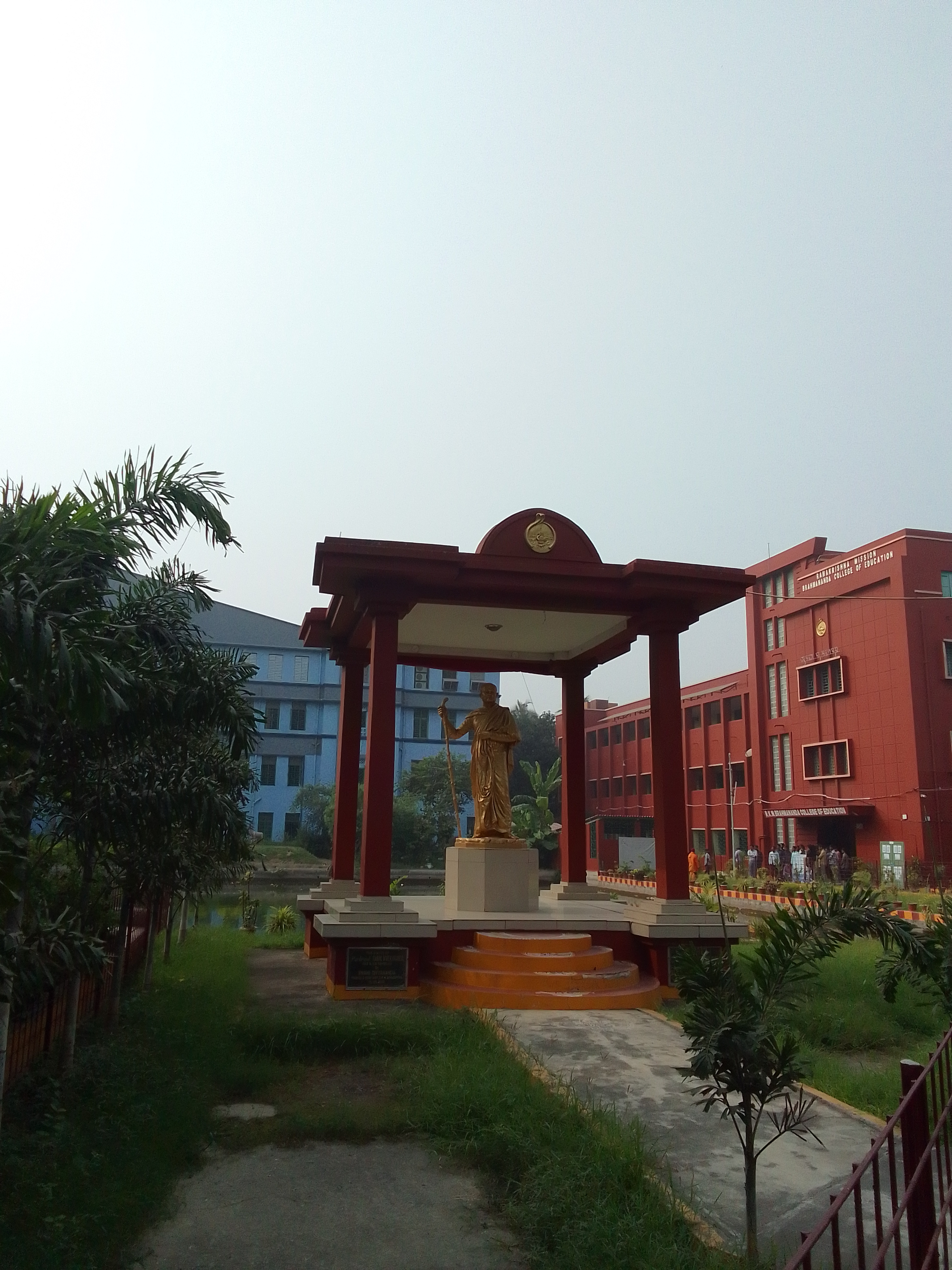
RK Mission Brahmananda College

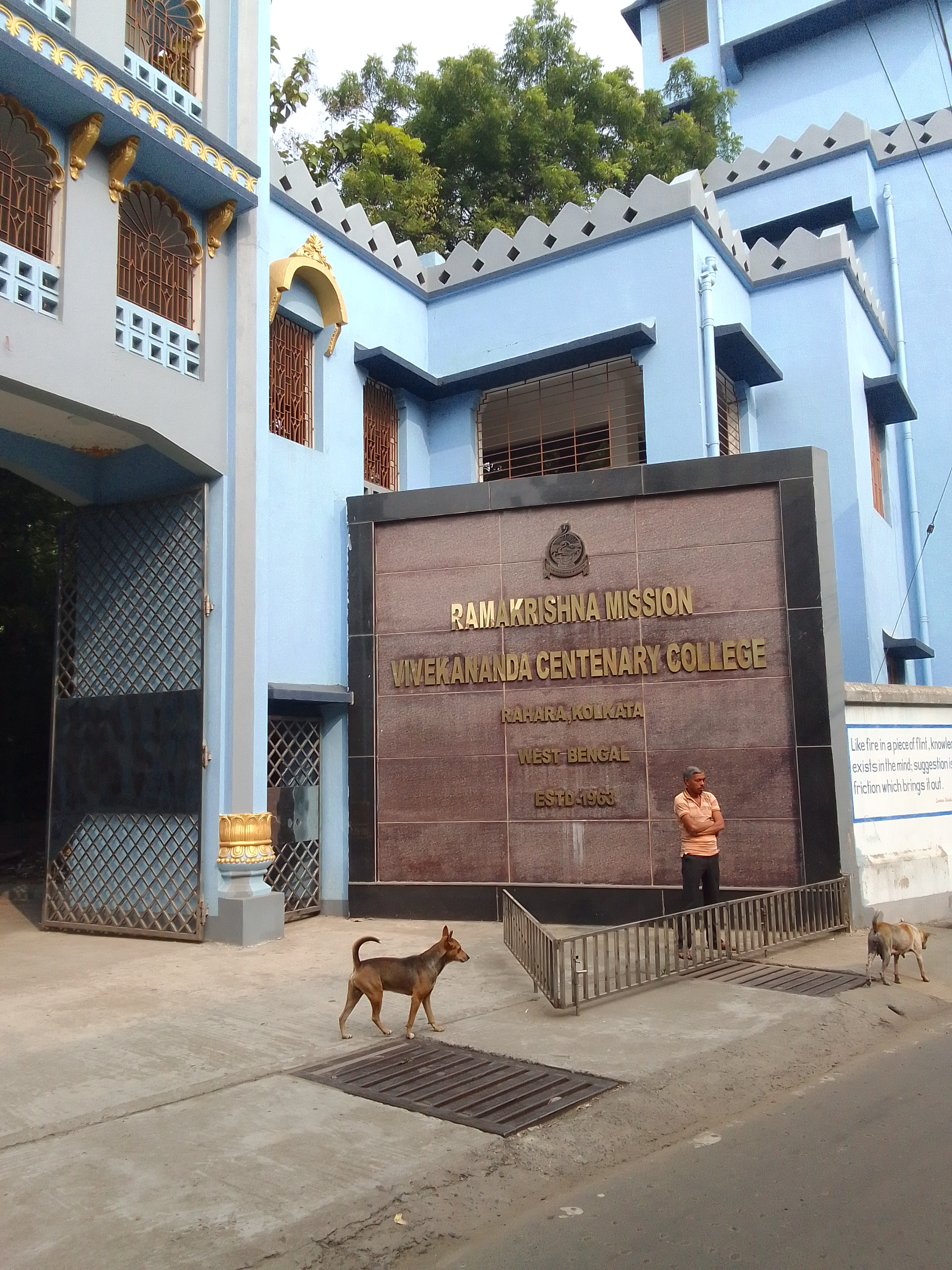
Centenary College gate, Brahmananda College

An all girls' school is located right by the side of Rahara Mission, called, Bhabhanath Institution for Girls. Kalyannagar Vidyapith, another school is also located in the area. There are also two High school situated at right side, they are Shibnath High School for Boys and Priyanath Girls School for Girls. Recently another English Medium school for secondary section has been established in the name of Khardaha Indira Memorial School.

== Health ==
Khardaha Municipal hospital or Balaram sevamandir is the main Govt. funded hospital in Khardaha. There are many private medical dispensaries with their own doctors and specialists scattered through town.

== Culture ==
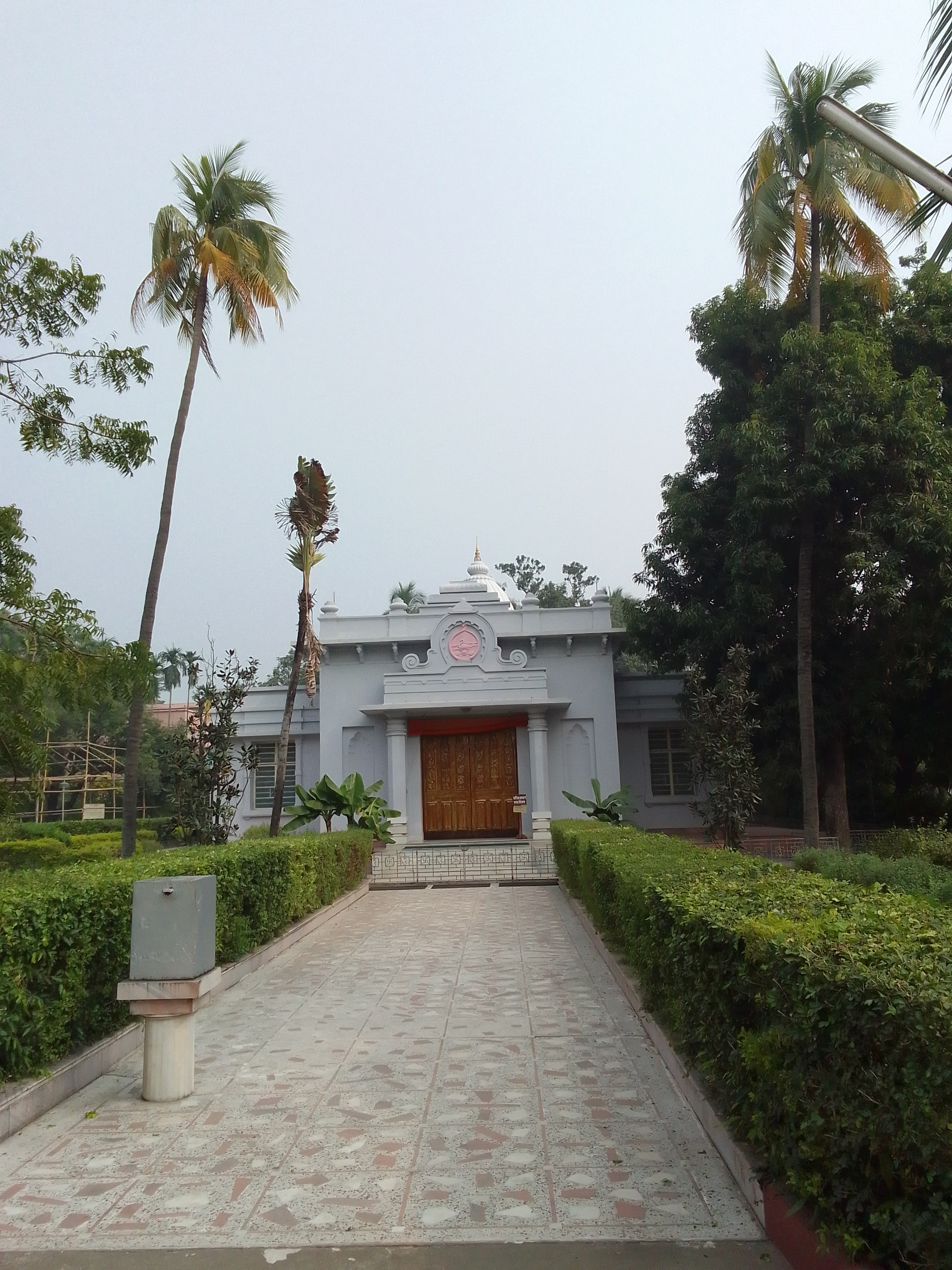
Rahara Ramakrishna Mission temple

Every year in the month of December, Khardaha municipality organizes a flower show. Khardaha Sanskritik Utsav (Cultural Festival) is organized on a regular basis, where performers from all over India come to entertain people. Khardaha book fair is a culturally significant event that takes place every year.

Nityananda Mahaprabhu, a primary religious figure within the Gaudiya Vaishnava tradition of Bengal, came and settled in a hut named Kunjabati at Khardaha.

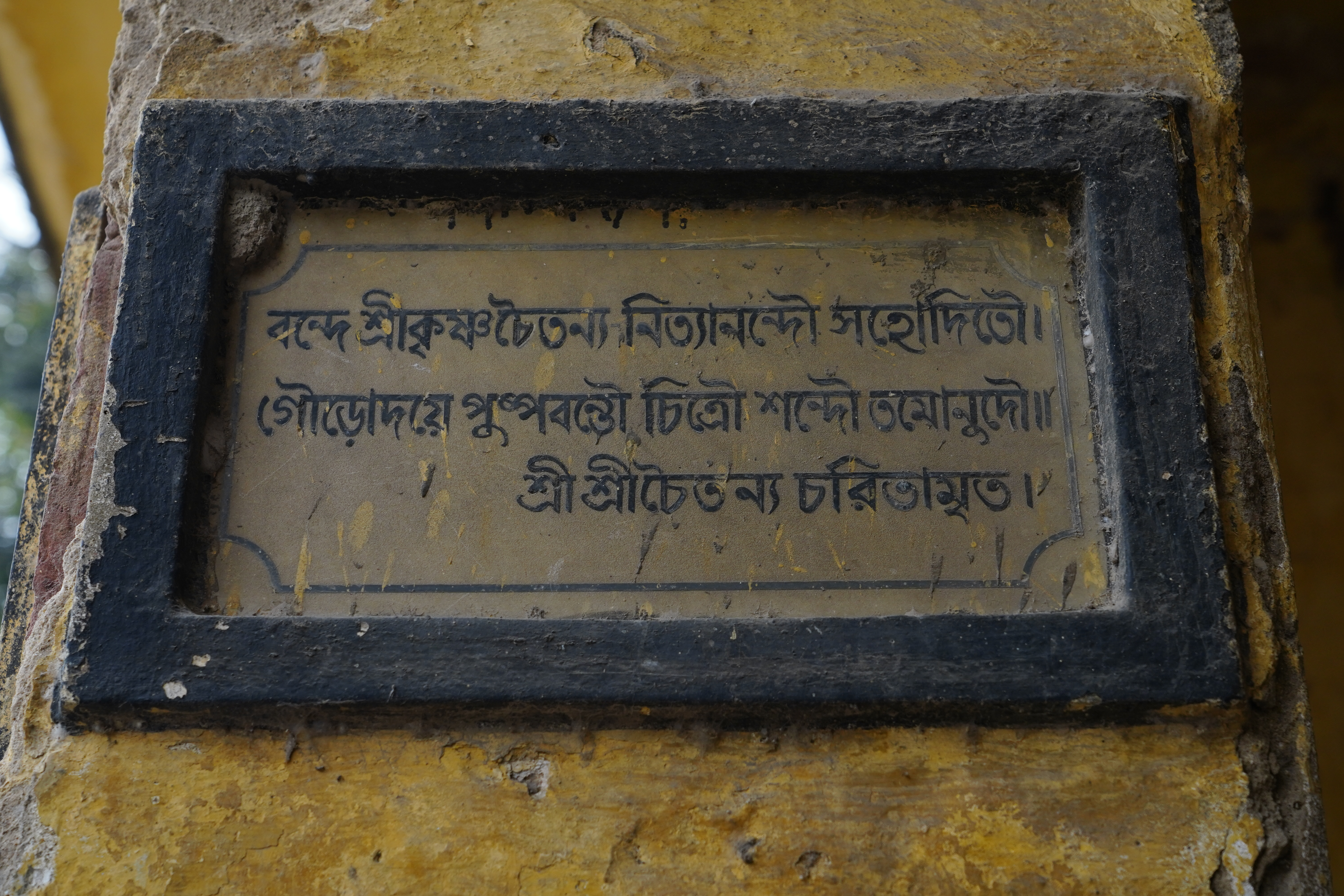
Kunjabati

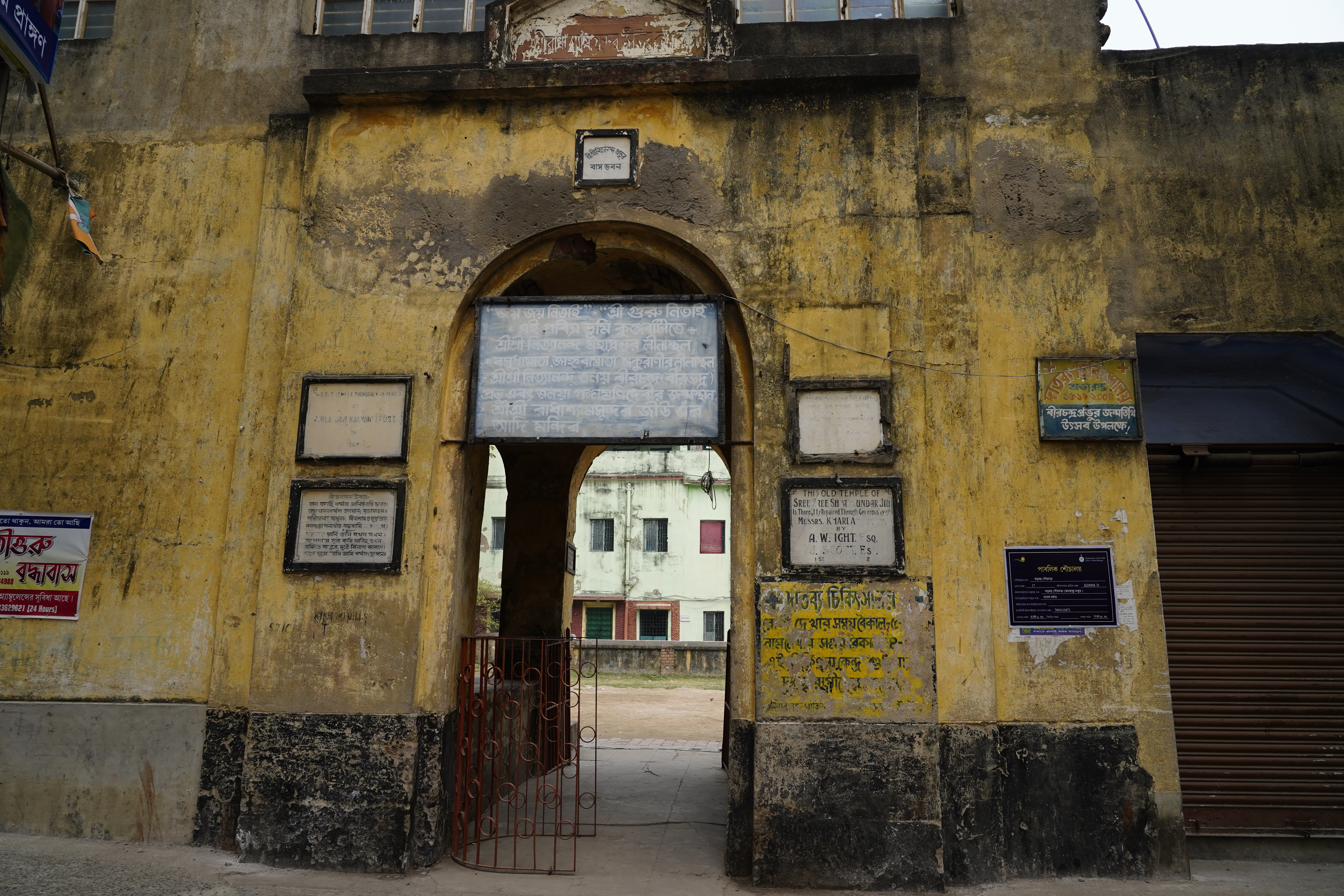
Kunjabati

His son and daughter were born at this place. After their death, they were buried here (read Samadhi (shrine) ).

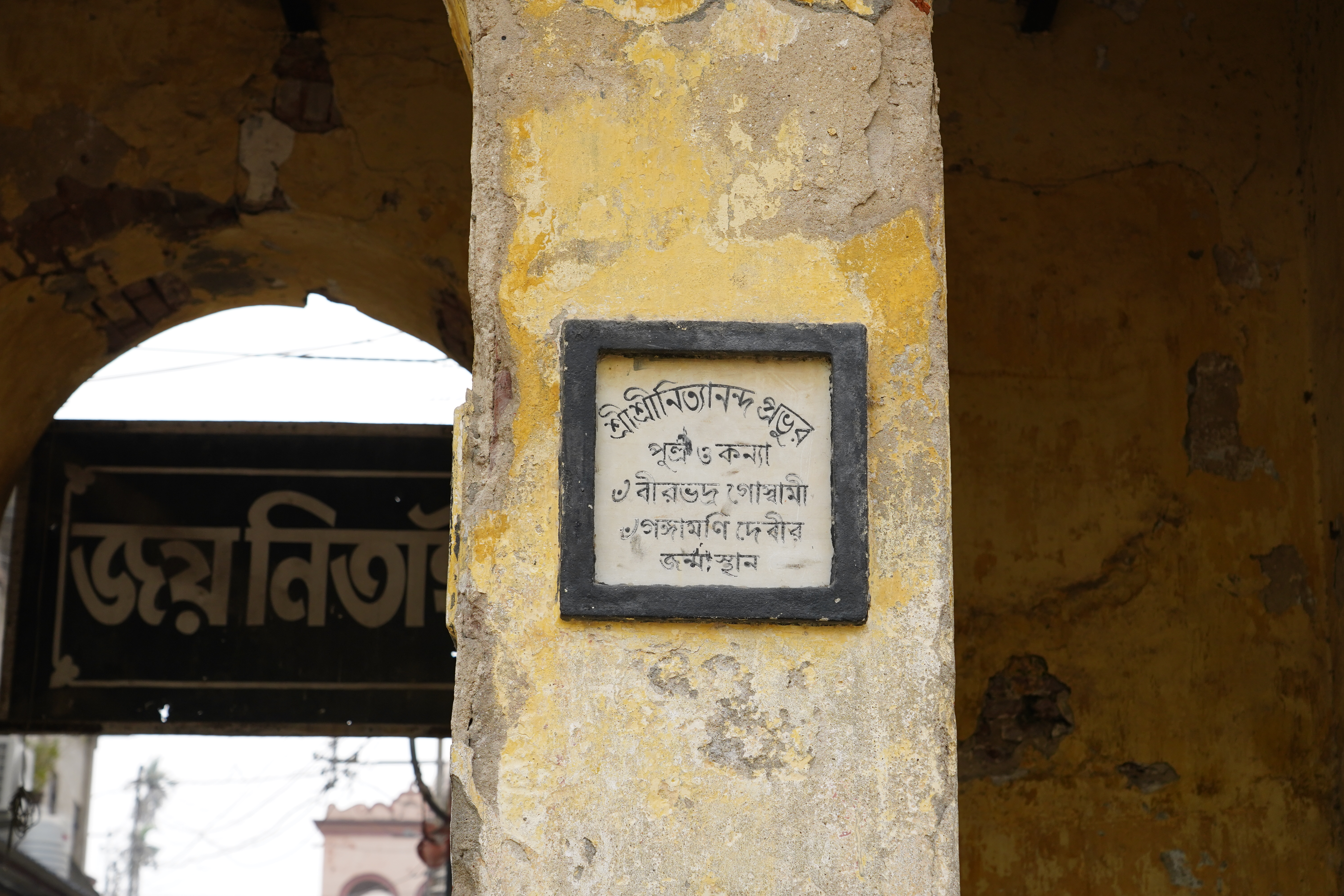
Kunjabati

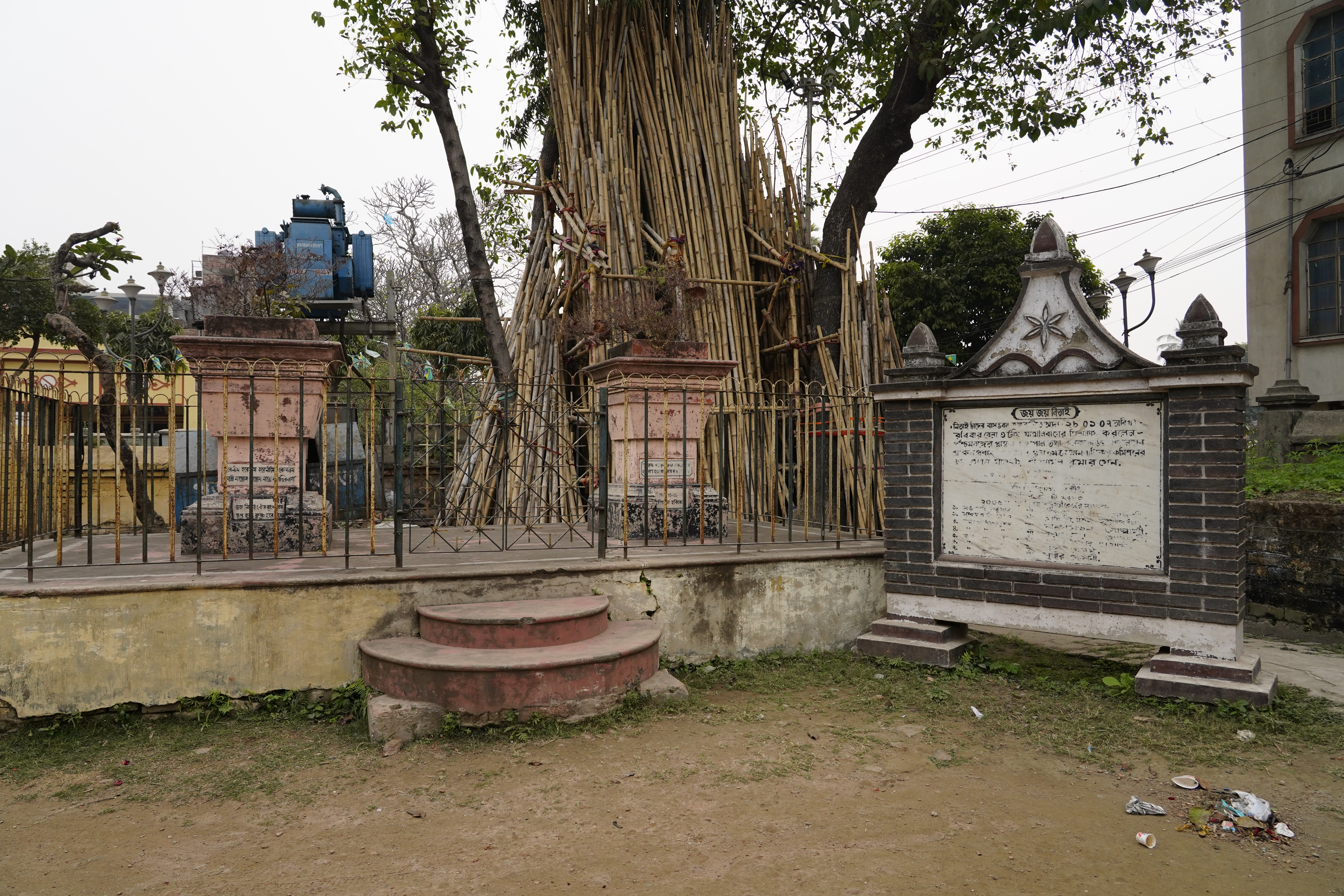
Kunjabati

26 Shiva temples were built on the bank of the Ganges, in the early 19th century by Ramhari Biswas and his son, Prankrishna.

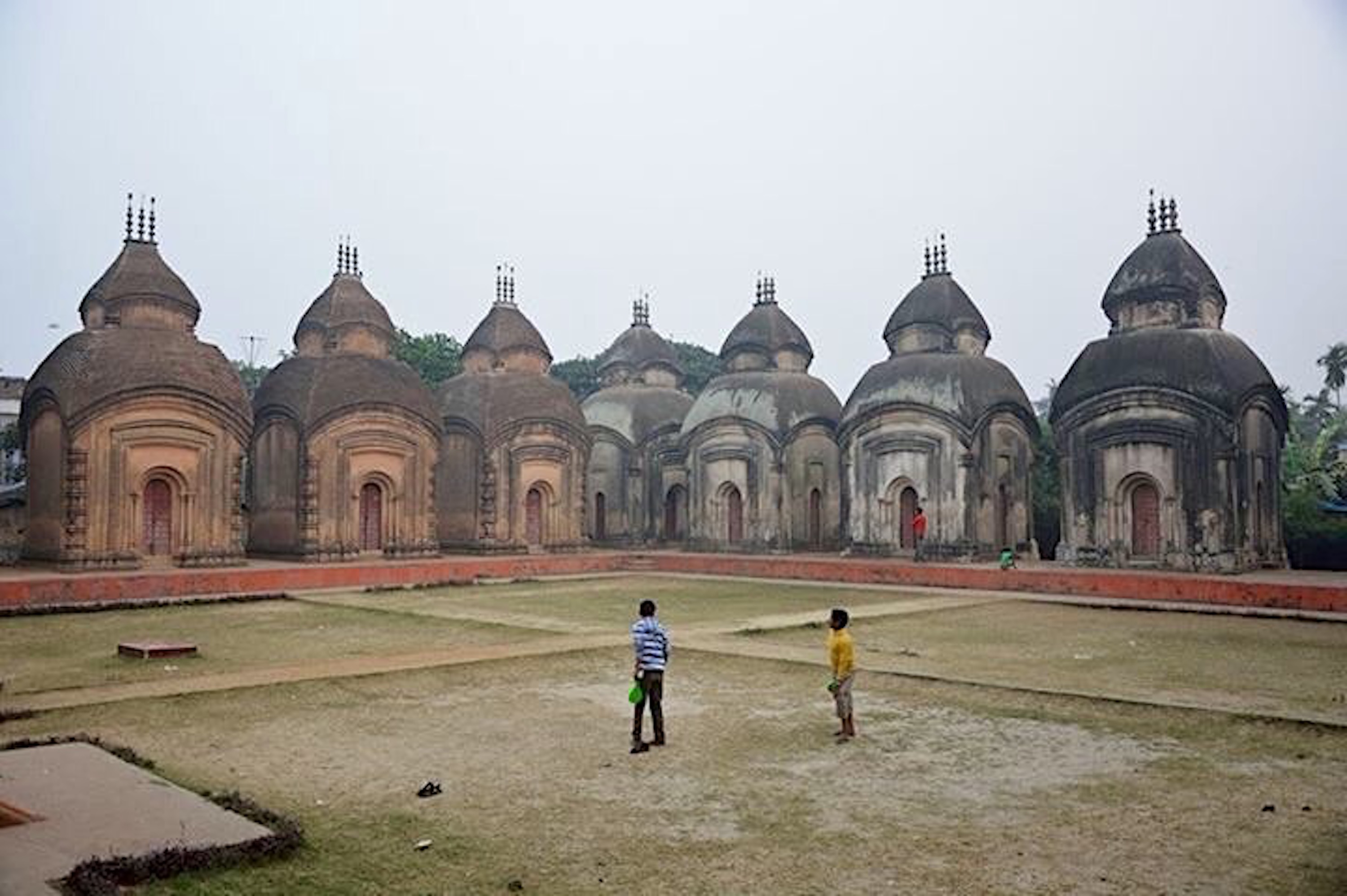
26 Shiva Temple complex of Khardah

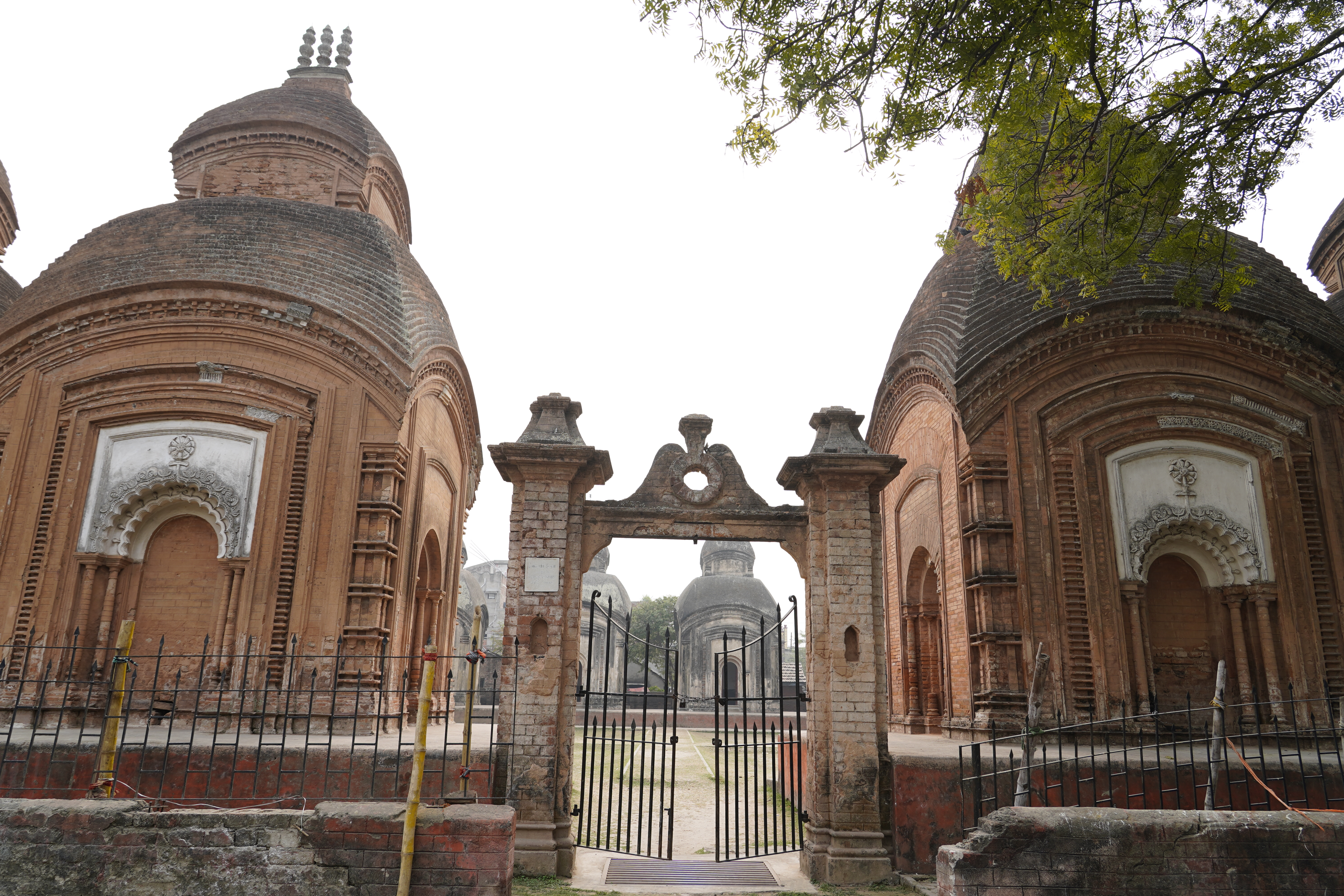
Entry to temple complex

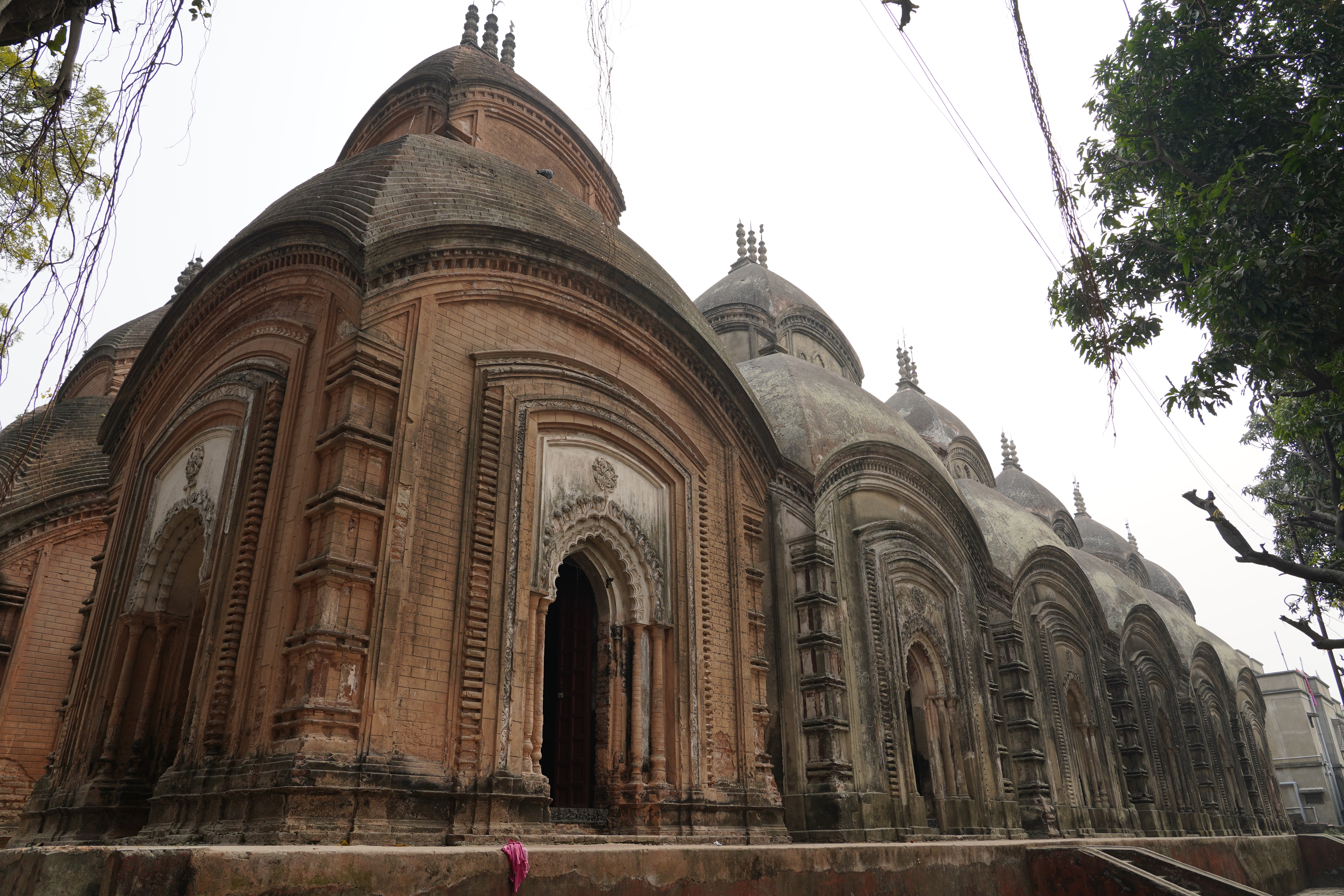
Near a temple

David J. McCutchion describes several temples at Khardaha:

- Shyama Sundar temple (18th century?) – renovated atchala with porch on triple archway

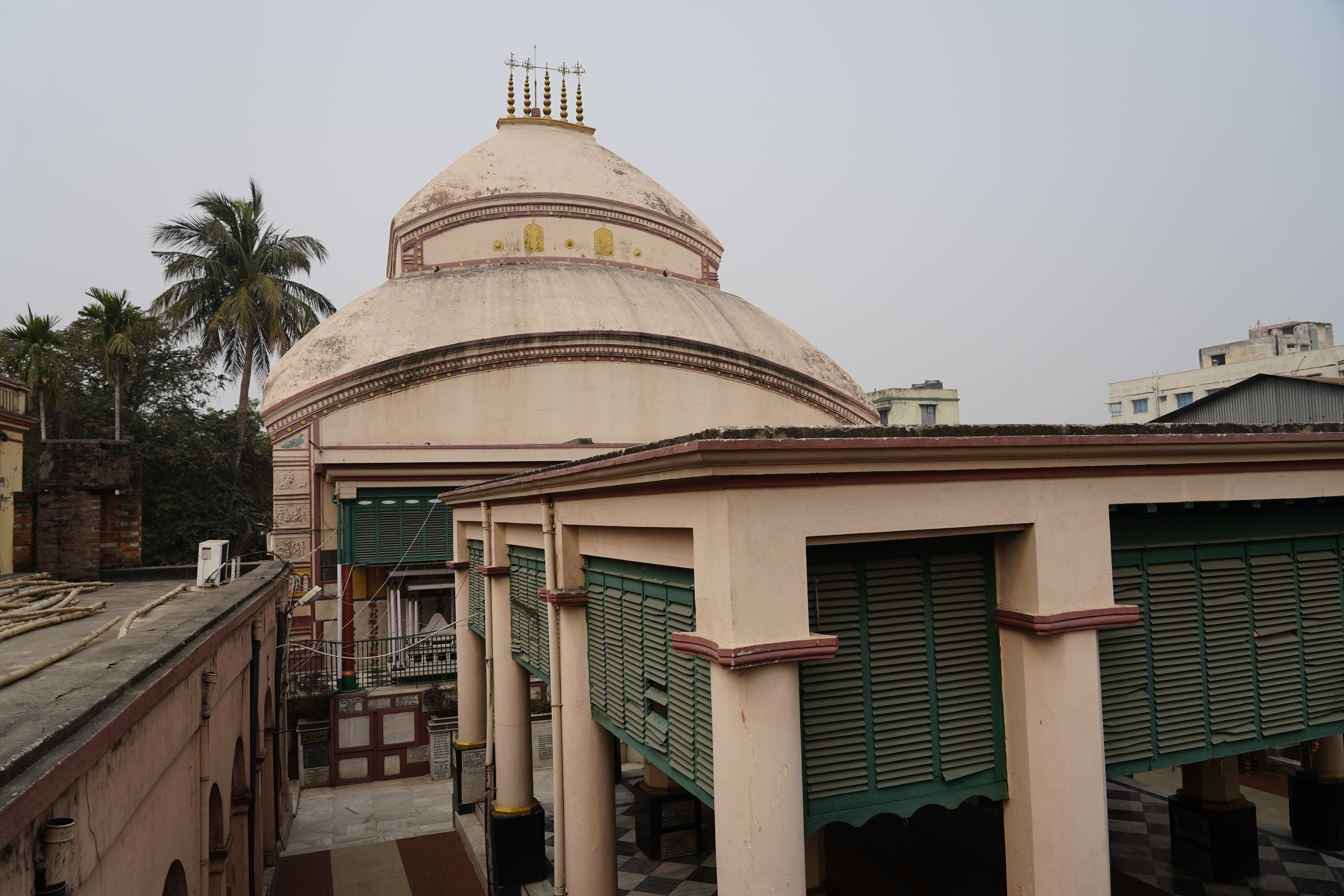
Shyamsundar Jiu temple

- Mahaprabhu Navaratna temple – straight corniced navaratna structure

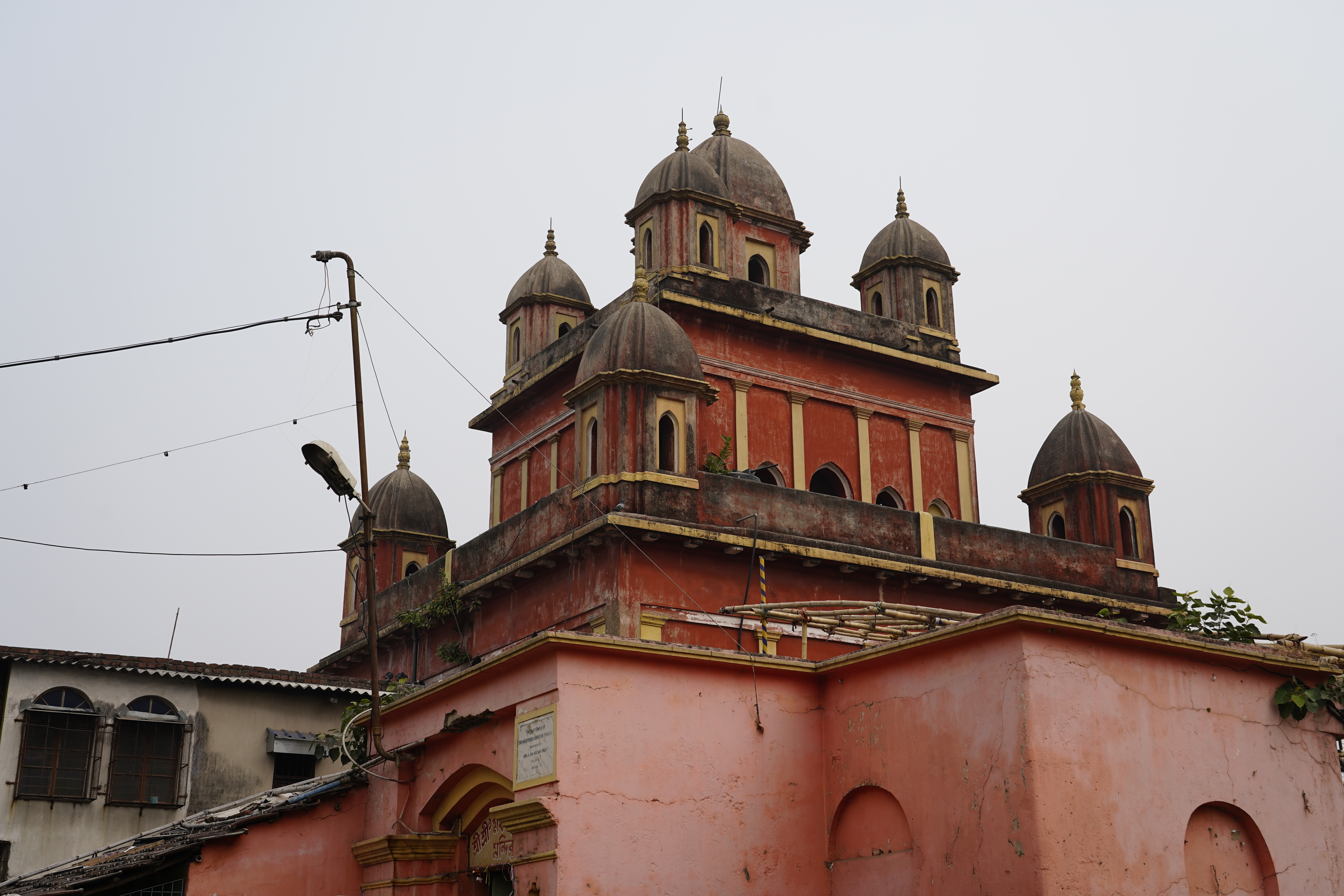
Mahaprabhu Navaratna temple

- Radhakanta Jiu temple - looks similar to Shyamsundar Jiu temple but smaller

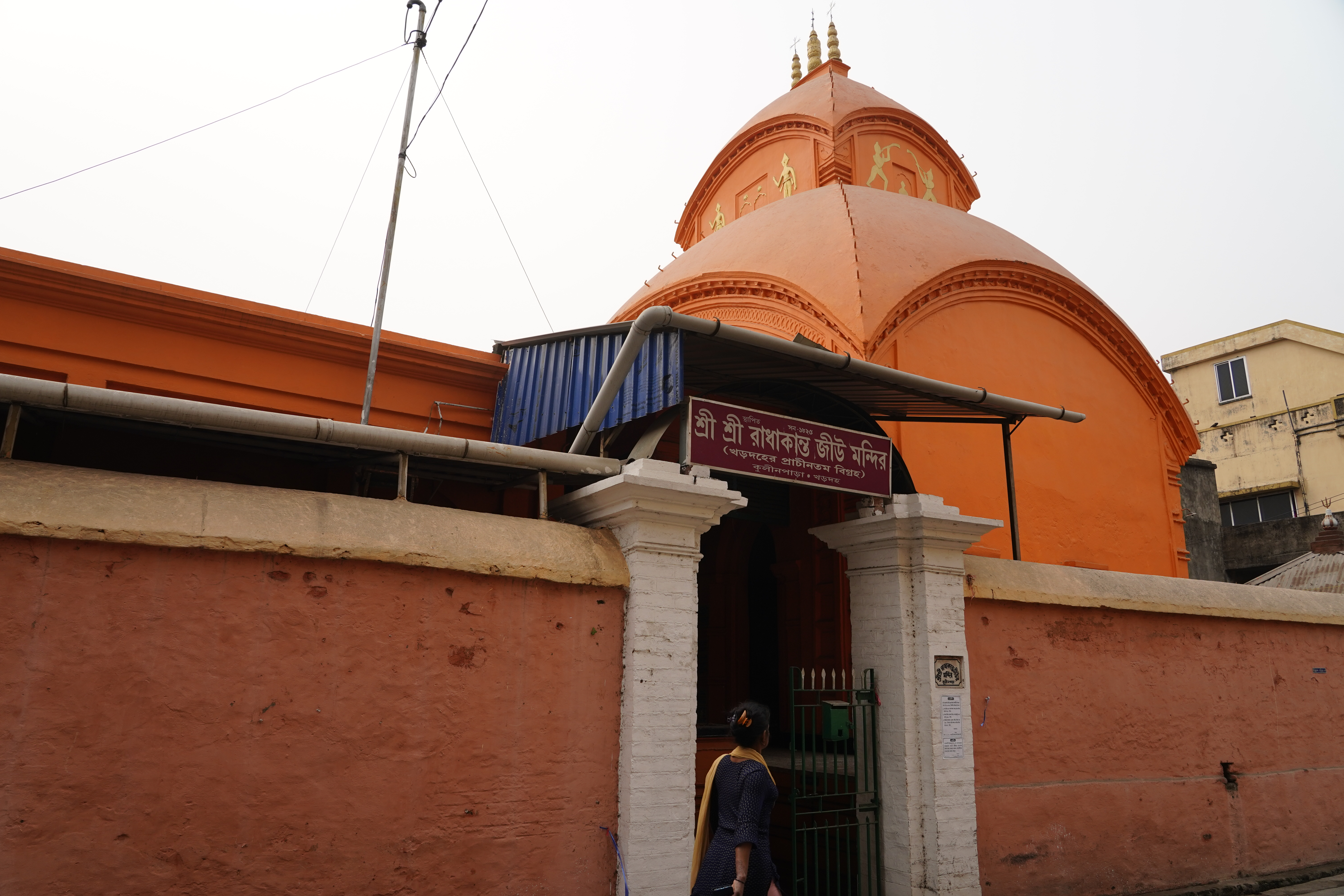
Radhakanta Jiu temple

- Rasmancha – low octagonal structure with 16 turrets

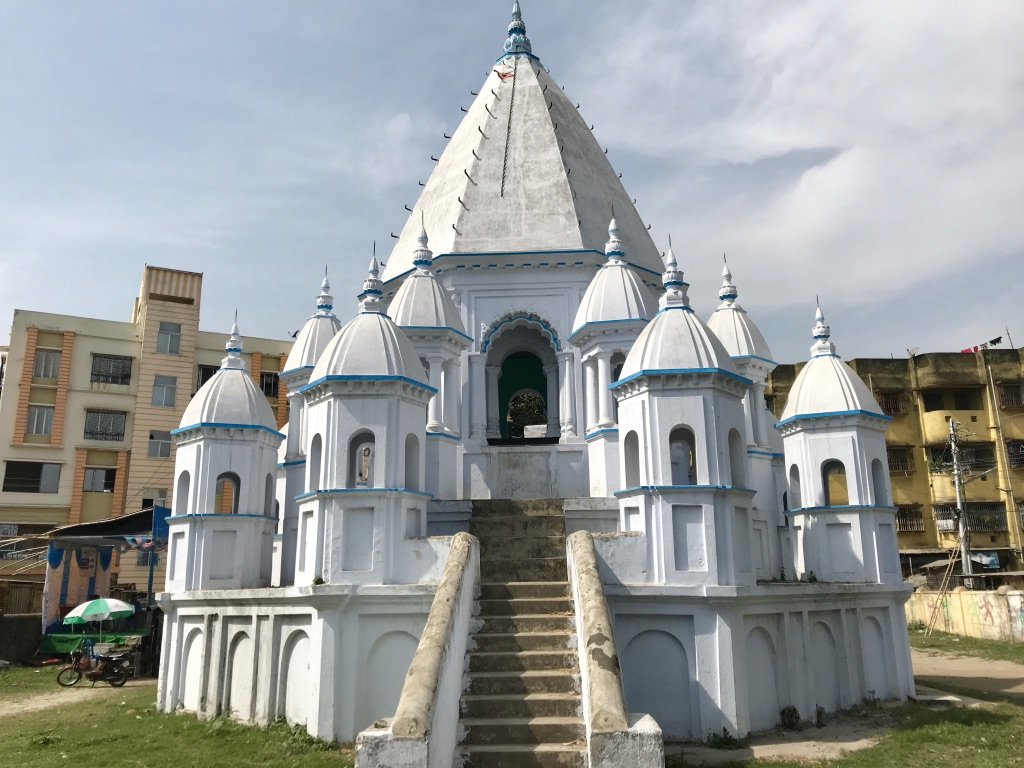
Rasmancha, Khardaha

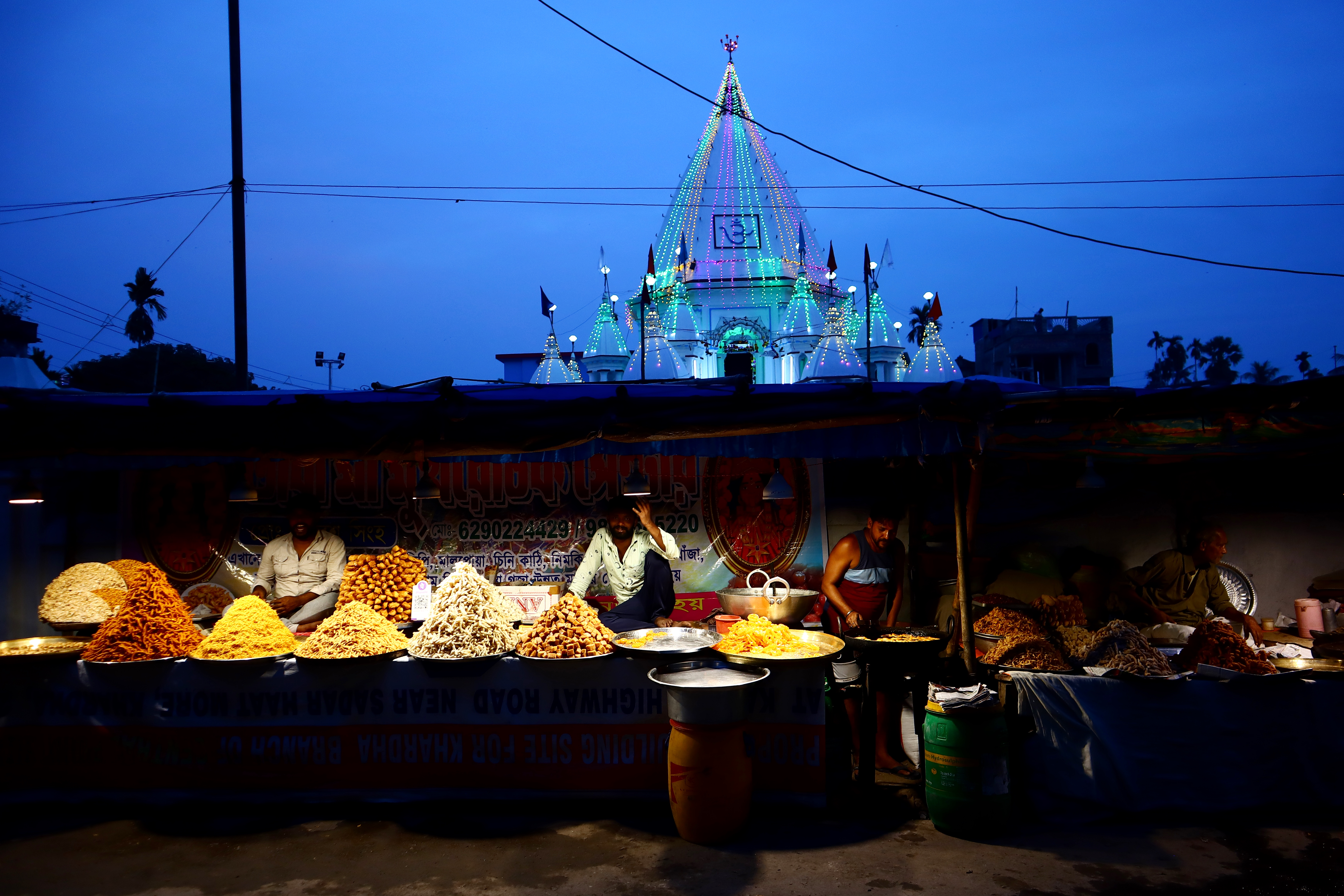
Gope Astami Mela at Rasmancha

- Rabindranath Tagore's one house was once near the ferry ghat but today only the entry Gate remains.
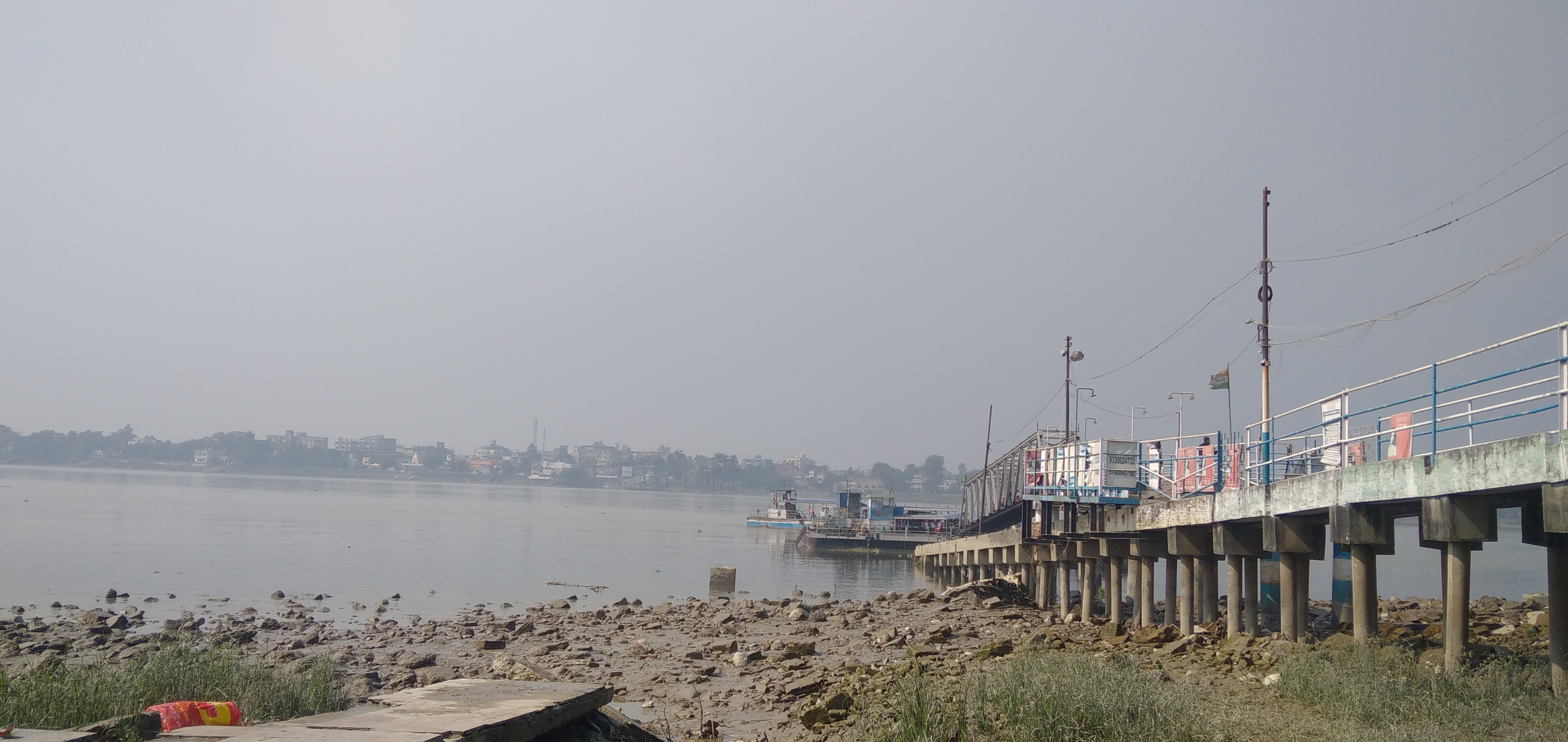
  Khardah ferry ghat
- Durga puja immersion ceremony near the Rashkhola ghat

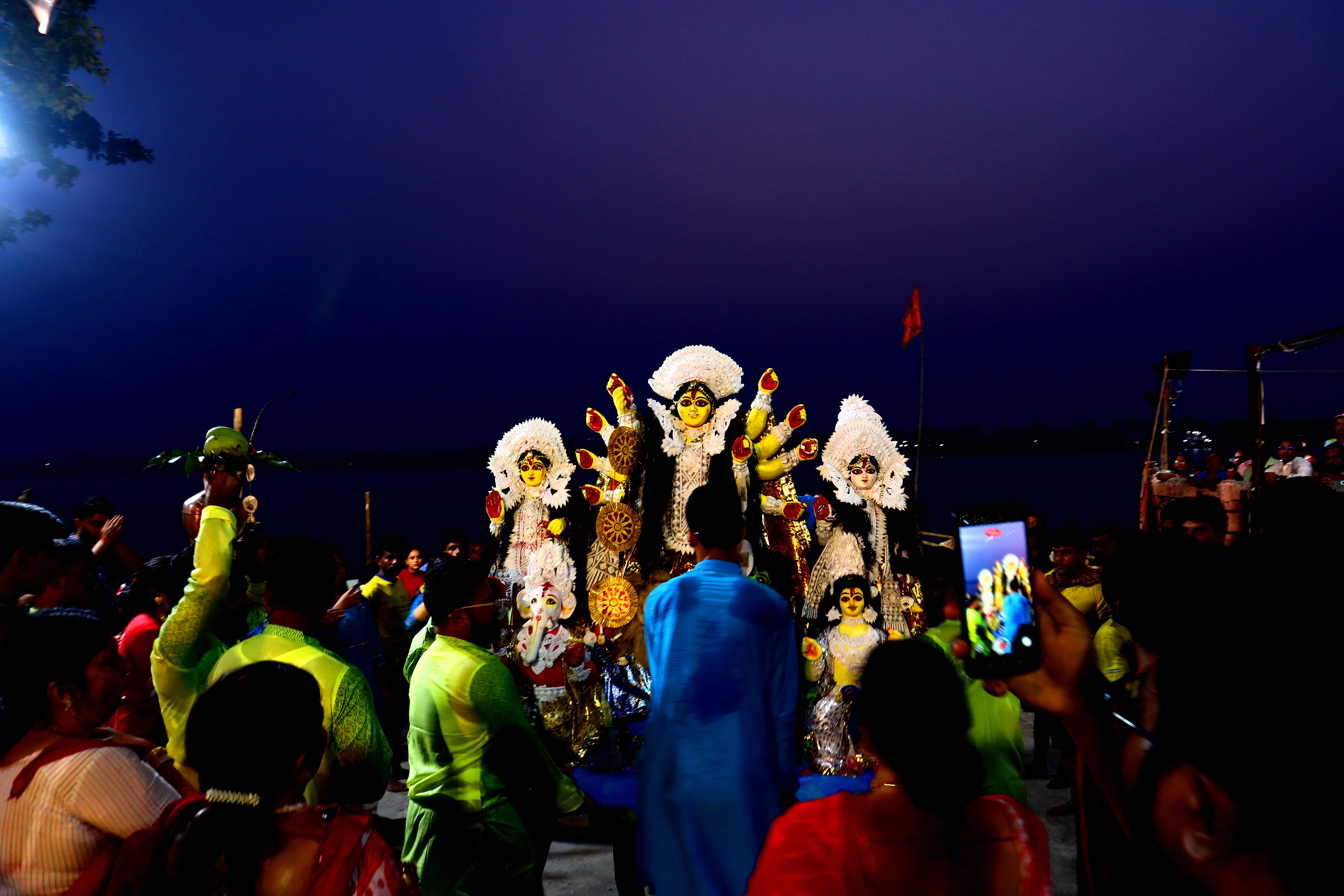
Immersion at Khardah ghat

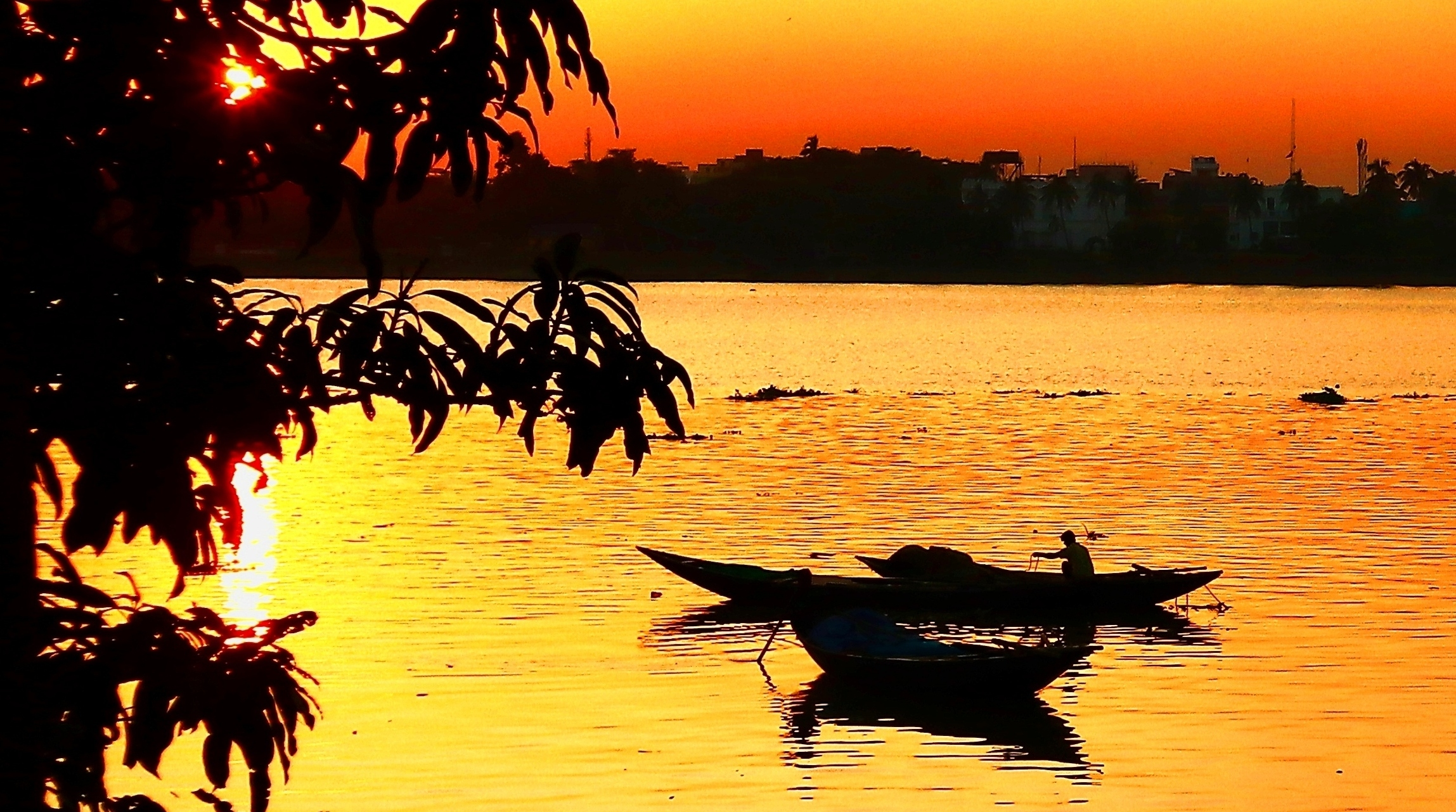
Sunset

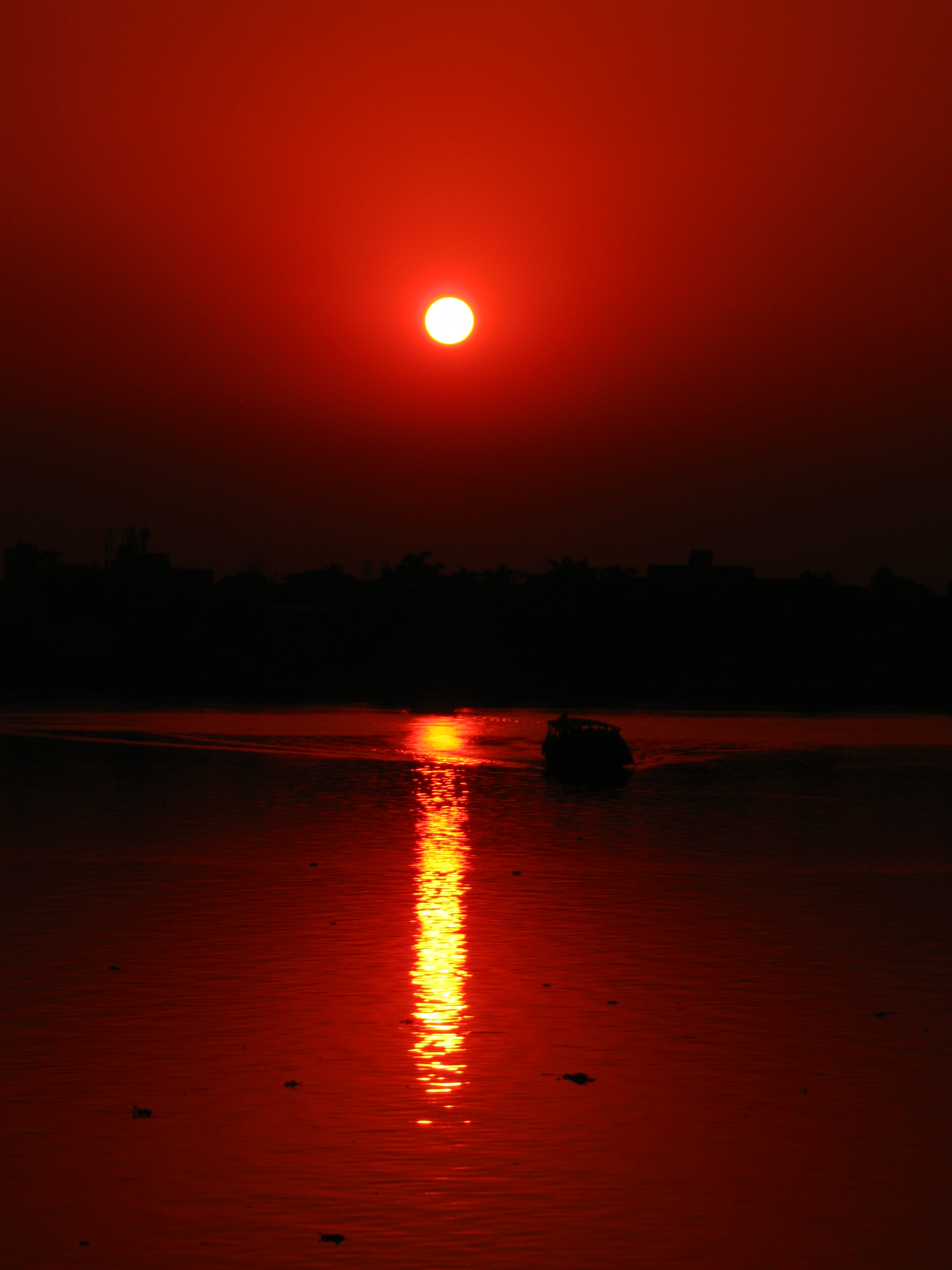
Sunset

== Notable people ==
- Shankar Chakraborty
- Jeetu Kamal
