= North Dum Dum =

Neighbourhood of Kolkata, India

- City
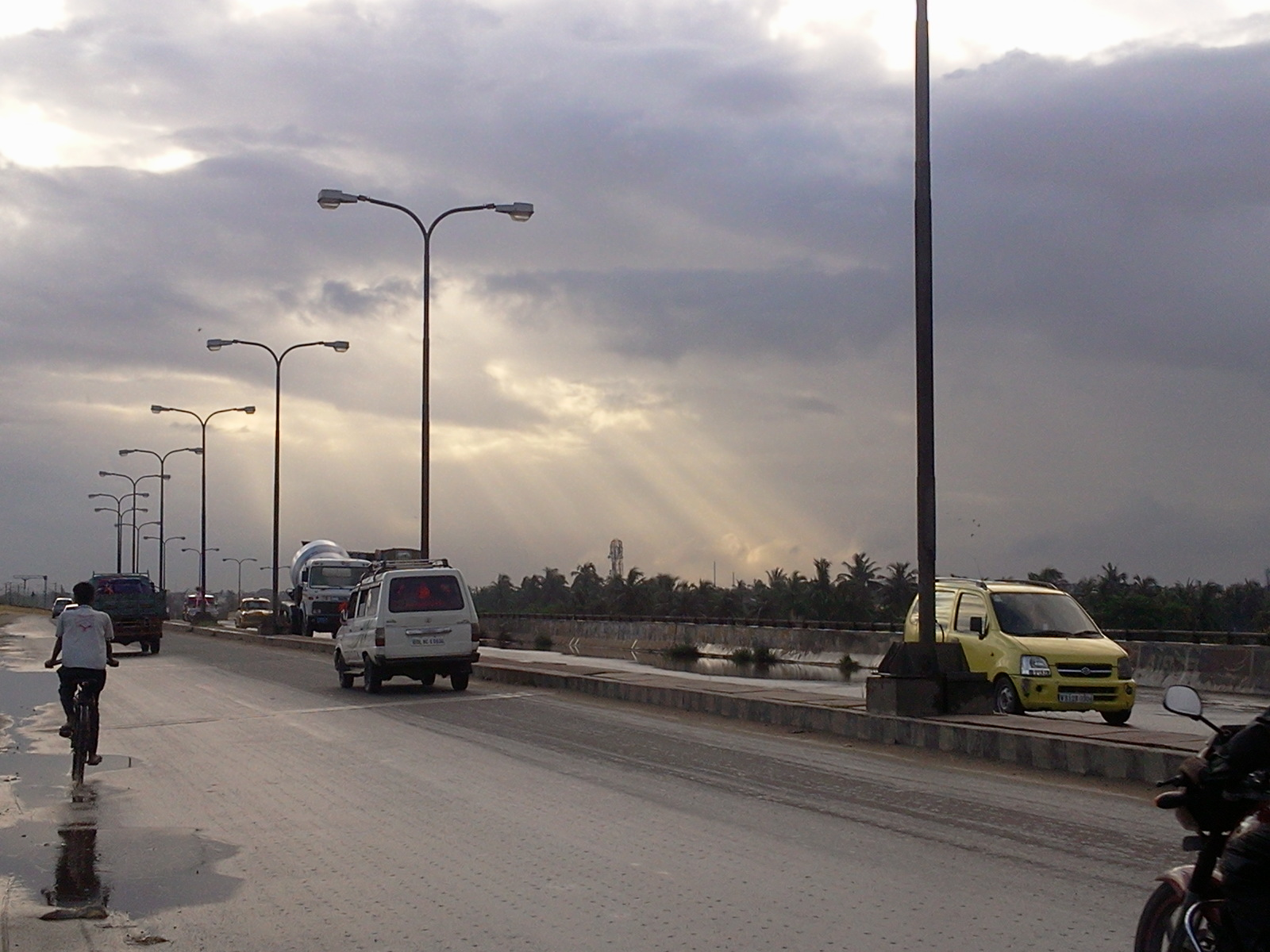
- Belghoria Expressway

- Location in West Bengal, India North Dum Dum (West Bengal) North Dum Dum (India)
- Coordinates: 22.6531°N 88.4194°E
- Country: India
- State: West Bengal
- Division: Presidency
- District: North 24 Parganas
- Metro Station: Jai Hind; Birati (under construction)
- Railway Station: Durganagar; Birati; Belgharia; Bisharpara
- Established: 1870; 156 years ago (as North Dum Dum Municipality)

Government
  - Type: Municipality
  - Body: North Dumdum Municipality
  - Chairman: Bidhan Biswas

Area
  - Total: 26.45 km^{2} (10.21 sq mi)

Population (2011)
  - Total: 251,142
  - Density: 9,495/km^{2} (24,590/sq mi)

Languages
  - Official: Bengali, English
- Time zone: UTC+5:30 (IST)
- PIN: 700049, 700051, 700065, 700081, 700134, 700158
- Telephone code: +91 33
- Vehicle registration: WB
- Lok Sabha constituency: Dum Dum
- Vidhan Sabha constituency: Dum Dum Uttar
- Website: northdumdummunicipality.org

North Dum Dum or Uttar Dum Dum is a city and a municipality of North 24 Parganas district in the Indian state of West Bengal. It is a part of the area covered by Kolkata Metropolitan Development Authority (KMDA).

== History ==
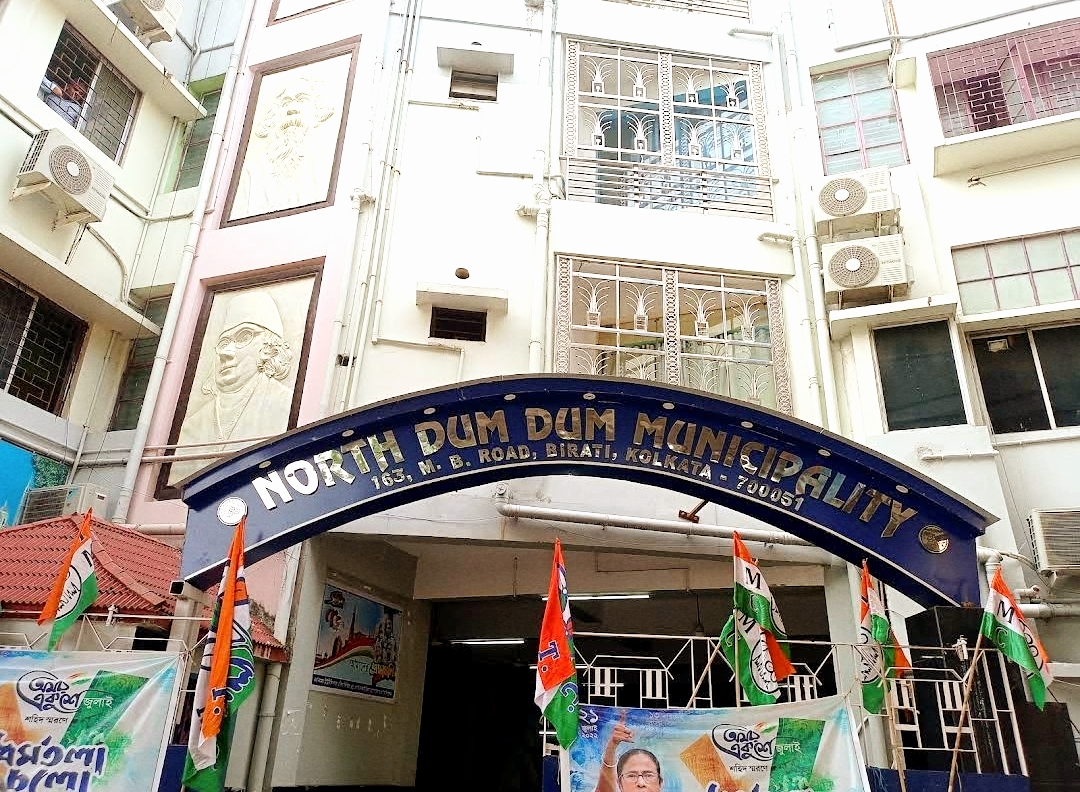
North Dum Dum Municipality, Birati

In 1870, Dum Dum was divided into two parts named as North Dum Dum and South Dum Dum. Though North Dum Dum Municipality was established on 10 September 1870. It comprised villages known as Birati, Nimta, Kadihati, Jangalpur Patna, Gouripur and a large area of what is now Netaji Subhas Chandra Bose International Airport. In 1998, Bisharpara gram panchayat and half of Sultanpur gram panchayat were merged with the Municipality.

With the partition of Bengal in 1947, "millions of refugees poured in from erstwhile East Pakistan." In the initial stages bulk of the refugees were non-agriculturists. A few of them made their own arrangements, but "it was squatters who made the East Bengali refugees famous or infamous." Squatting (jabardakhal in Bengali) ranged from the forcible occupation of barracks to the collective take-over of private, government and waste land. By 1949, there were 65 refugee colonies in the Dum Dum and Panihati zone. The squatters were in a way “self-settlers” in the absence of adequate official arrangements for rehabilitation. Within a very short time the refugees (quite often with government/ administrative support) not only found a place to stay but developed a society with markets, schools, temples and sometimes even colleges, hospitals and recreational centres.

== Geography ==
Cities and towns in the southern portion of Barrackpore subdivision in North 24 Parganas district
M: municipal city/ town, CT: census town,
N: neighbourhood/ administrative location
Owing to space constraints in the small map, the actual locations in a larger map may vary slightly

=== Location ===
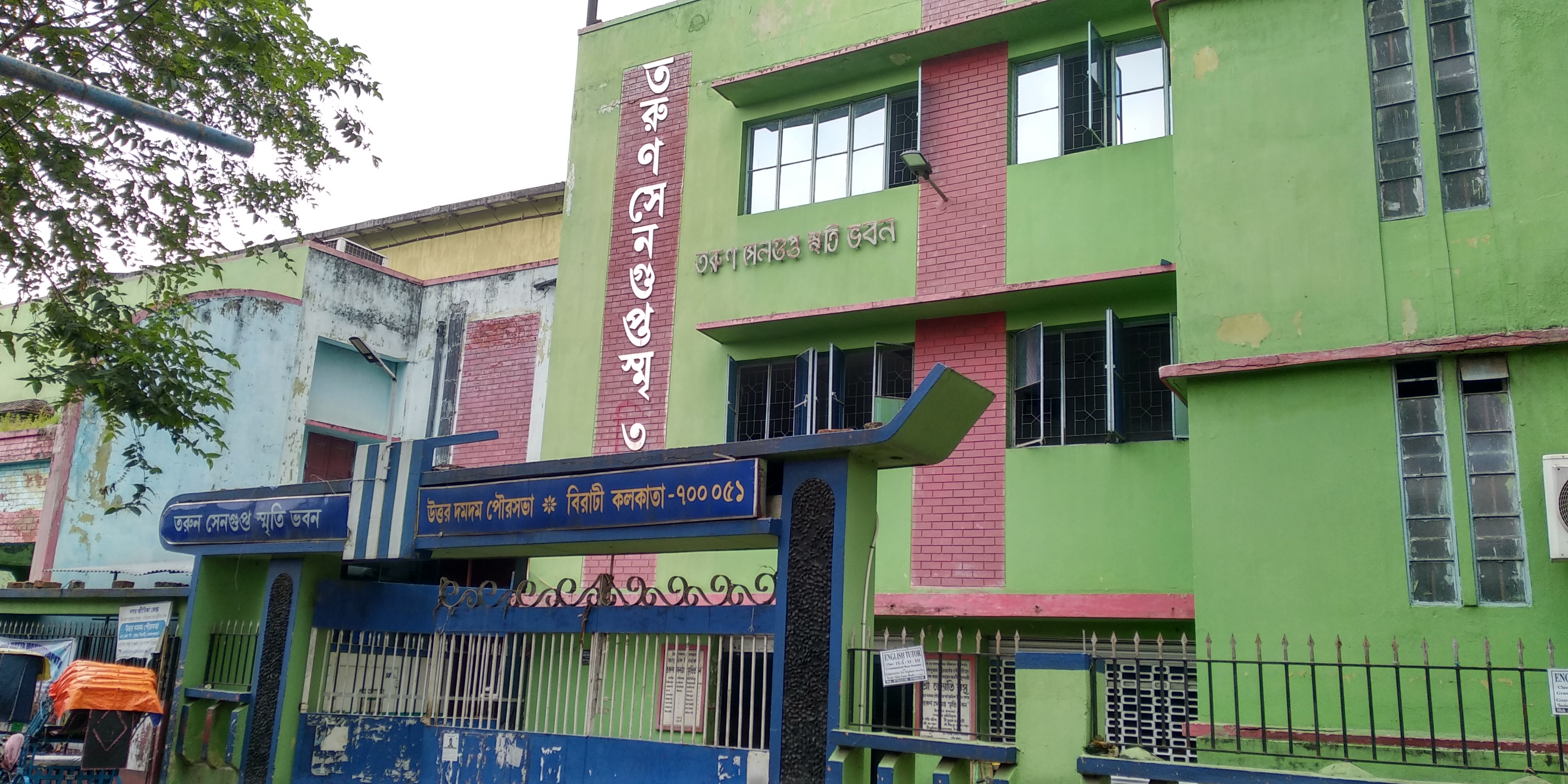
Tarun Sengupta Smriti Bhavan

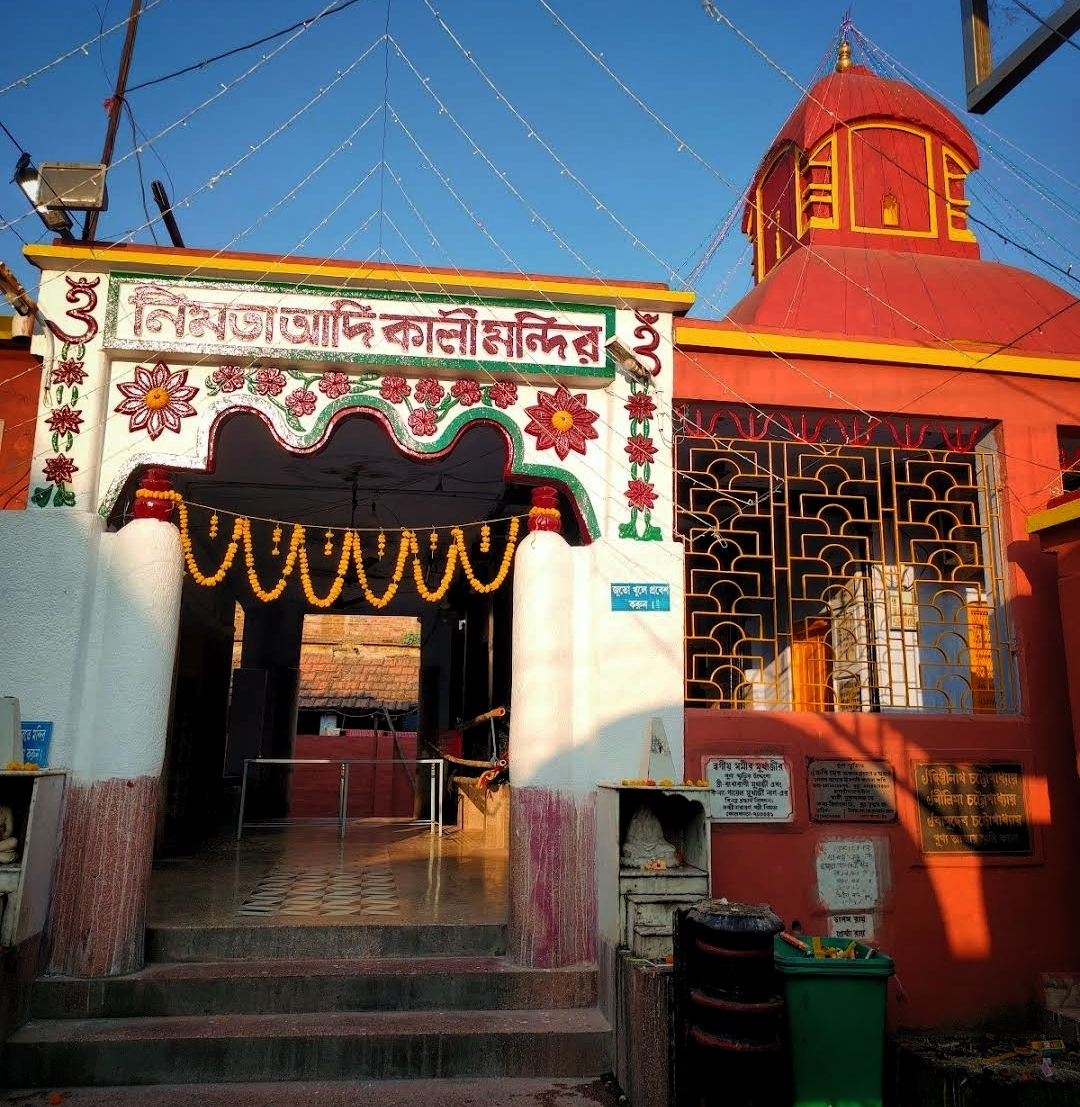
Nimta Adi Kalibari

North Dum Dum is located at 22.6520800°N 88.4190700°E.

North Dumdum is bounded by Panihati (Municipality) and New Barrackpore (Municipality) on the north, Madhyamgram (Municipality) and BMC areas on the east, Dum Dum (Municipality) and South Dum Dum (Municipality) on the south and Kamarhati (Municipality) on the west.

North Dum Dum consists of localities such as Birati, Nimta, Durganagar and Bisharpara.

96% of the population of Barrackpore subdivision (partly presented in the map alongside, all places marked on the map are linked in the full screen map) lives in urban areas. In 2011, it had a density of population of 10,967 per km^{2} The subdivision has 16 municipalities and 24 census towns.

For most of the cities/ towns information regarding density of population is available in the Infobox. Population data is not available for neighbourhoods. It is available for the entire municipal area and thereafter ward-wise.

=== Police station ===
Nimta police station under Barrackpore Police Commissionerate has jurisdiction over North Dumdum Municipal areas.

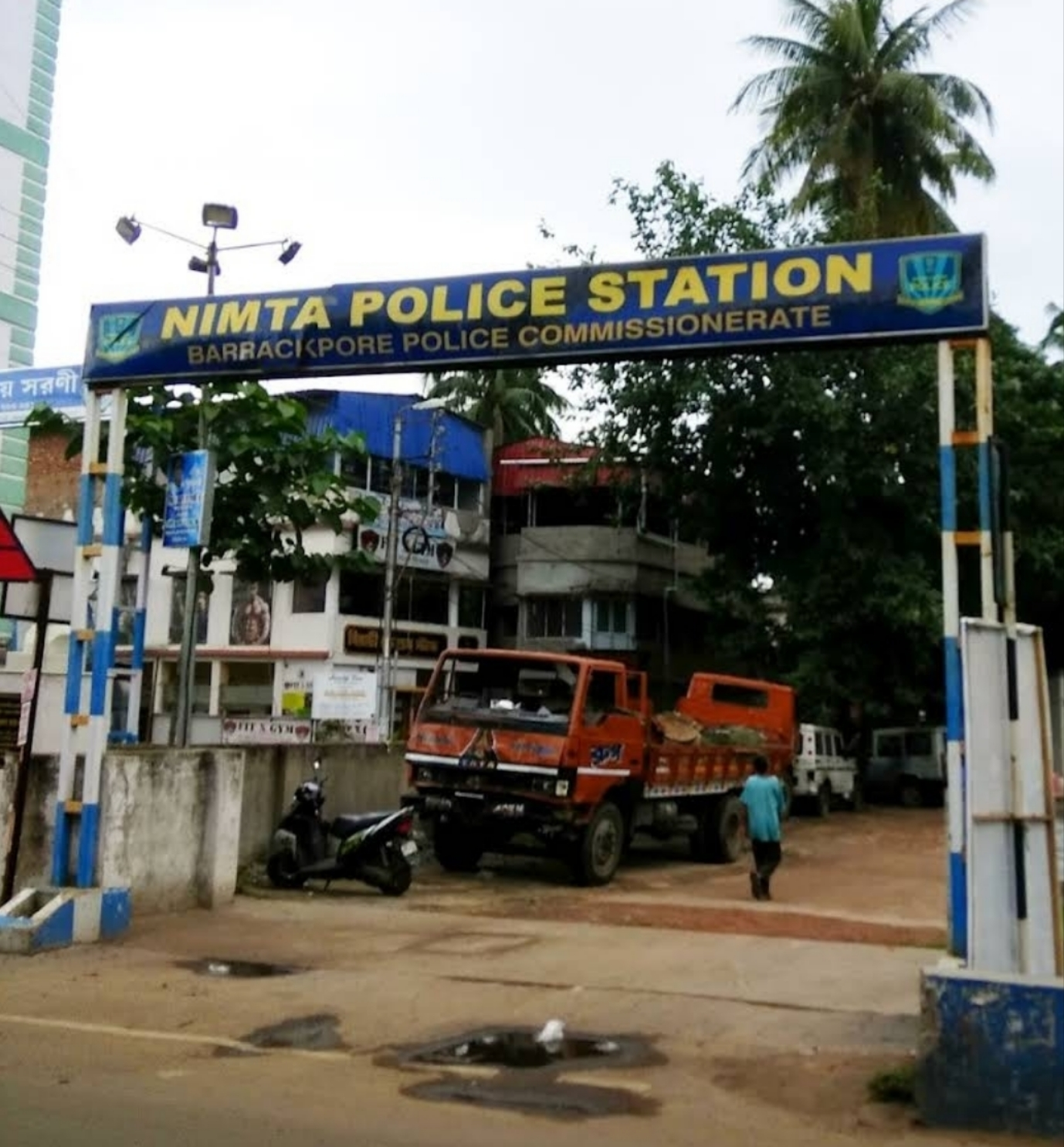
Nimta Police Station

Airport police station under Bidhannagar Police Commissionerate also has jurisdiction over North Dumdum municipal areas.

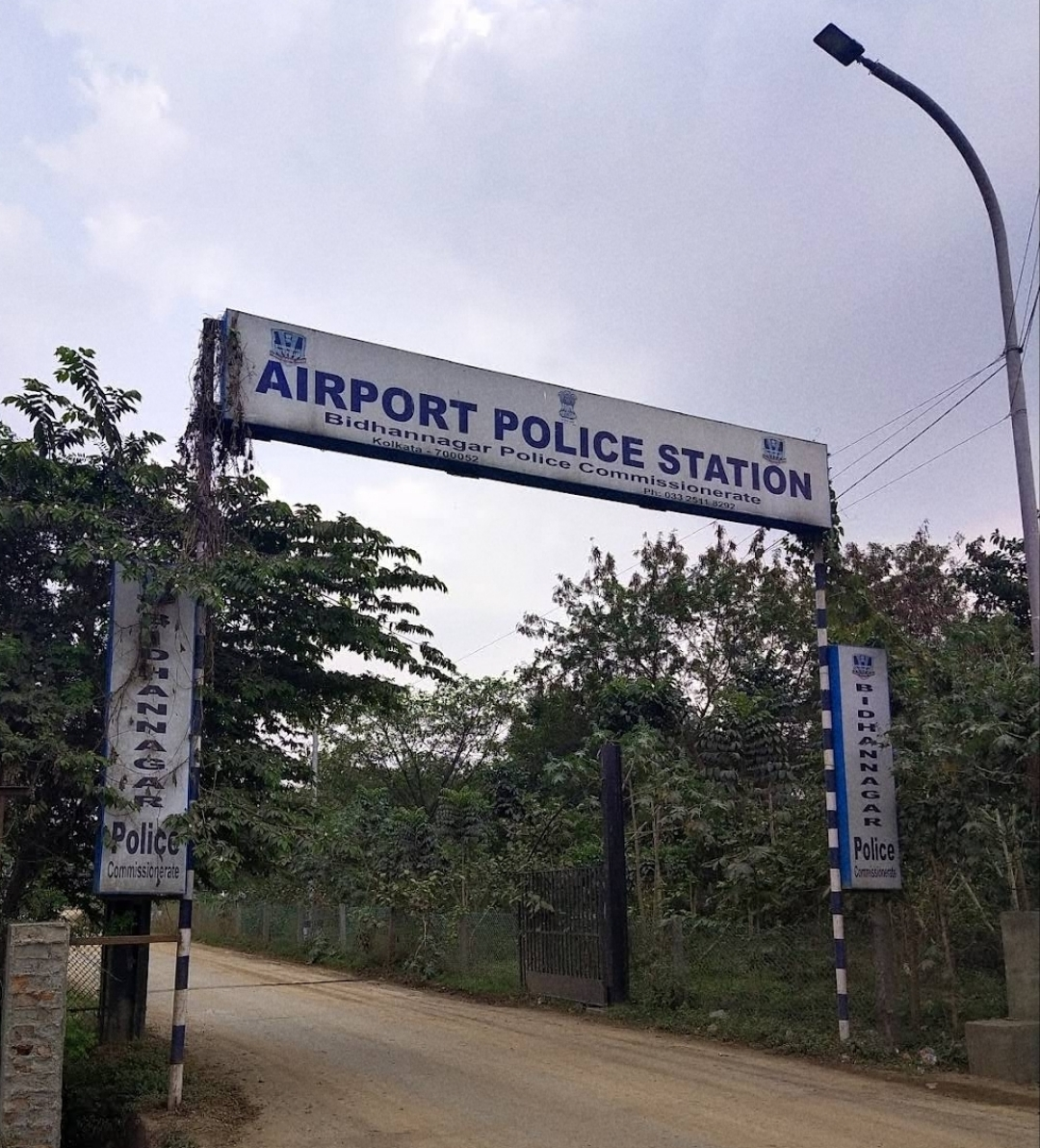
Airport Police Station

=== Post Offices ===
North Dum Dum is a vast locality with many Postal Index Numbers:

Nimta has a delivery sub post office, with PIN 700049. The only other post offices with the same PIN is Udaipur.

Birati has a delivery sub post office, with PIN 700051. The only other post offices with the same PIN is Sultanpur.

Durganagar has a non-delivery sub post office, with PIN 700065.

Rajbari Colony has a delivery sub post office, with PIN 700081.

Nilachal has a delivery sub post office, with PIN 700134.

Bisharpara has a delivery sub post office, with PIN 700158.

== Demographics ==
=== Population ===
Historical population
Year	Pop.	±%
1901	9,916	—
1911	8,865	−10.6%
1921	8,224	−7.2%
1931	4,535	−44.9%
1941	5,974	+31.7%
1951	12,156	+103.5%
1961	38,140	+213.8%
1971	63,873	+67.5%
1981	96,418	+51.0%
1991	149,965	+55.5%
2001	220,042	+46.7%
2011	249,142	+13.2%
Source: Census of India

As per the 2011 Census of India, North Dum Dum had a total population of 249,142, of which 126,279 (51%) were males and 122,863 (49%) were females. Population below 6 years was 18,411. The total number of literates in New Barrackpore was 209,964 (91.00% of the population over 6 years).

As of 2001 India census, North Dumdum had a population of 220,032. Males constitute 51% of the population and females 49%. North Dumdum has an average literacy rate of 82%, higher than the national average of 59.5%: male literacy is 86%, and female literacy is 79%. In North Dumdum, 9% of the population is under 6 years .

=== Kolkata Urban Agglomeration ===
The following Municipalities, Census Towns and other locations in Barrackpore subdivision were part of Kolkata Urban Agglomeration in the 2011 census: Kanchrapara (M), Jetia (CT), Halisahar (M), Balibhara (CT), Naihati (M), Bhatpara (M), Kaugachhi (CT), Garshyamnagar (CT), Garulia (M), Ichhapur Defence Estate (CT), North Barrackpur (M), Barrackpur Cantonment (CB), Barrackpore (M), Jafarpur (CT), Ruiya (CT), Titagarh (M), Khardaha (M), Bandipur (CT), Panihati (M), Muragachha (CT) New Barrackpore (M), Chandpur (CT), Talbandha (CT), Patulia (CT), Kamarhati (M), Baranagar (M), South Dumdum (M), North Dumdum (M), Dum Dum (M), Noapara (CT), Babanpur (CT), Teghari (CT), Nanna (OG), Chakla (OG), Srotribati (OG) and Panpur (OG).

== Economy ==
=== KMDA ===
North Dum Dum municipality is included in the Kolkata Metropolitan Area for which the KMDA is the statutory planning and development authority.

== Transport ==
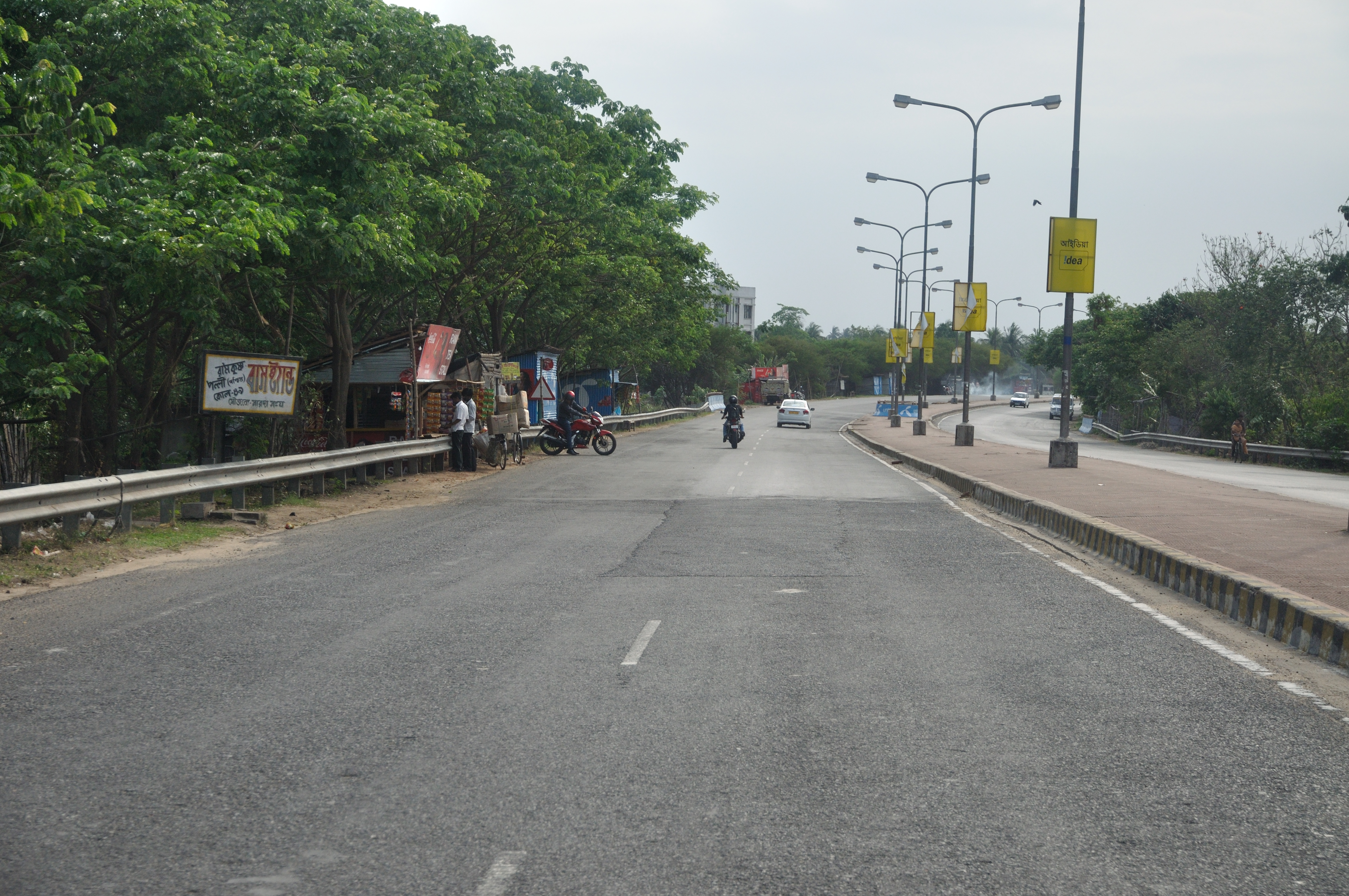
Belghoria Expressway, Durganagar

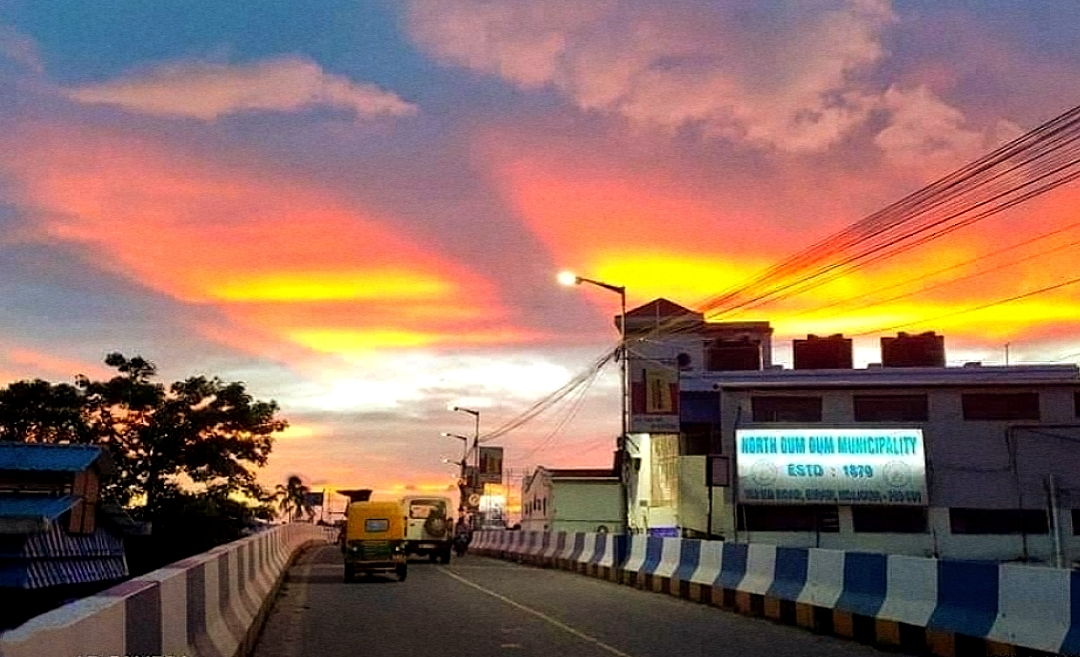
Manik Bandhopadhyay Setu (Birati Flyover)

Belghoria Expressway, locally popular as Delhi Road, passes through North Dumdum which connects NH 12 (Jessore Road) near Kolkata Airport. The Madhusudan Banerjee Road also known as M.B Road, is a road in Birati that connects Birati to Belgharia, passes through North Dumdum which connects Kalyani Expressway at Nimta. The construction of 6 lane elevated connector between Belghoria Expressway and Kalyani Expressway including widening of Kalyani Expressway to 6 lane from Nimta to Muragacha is in progress. After meeting Kalyani Expy. at Nimta, M.B Road also connects NH 12 (Jessore Road) at Birati More. A flyover named Manik Bandhopadhyay Setu also known as Birati Flyover was constructed between Birati College and Banik More over Birati railway station. Another road named Muzaffar Ahmed Sarani passes through Bisharpara in North Dumdum. Several buses ply on Madhusudan Banerjee Rd, Belghoria Expressway, Kalyani Expressway and NH 12 (Jessore Road).

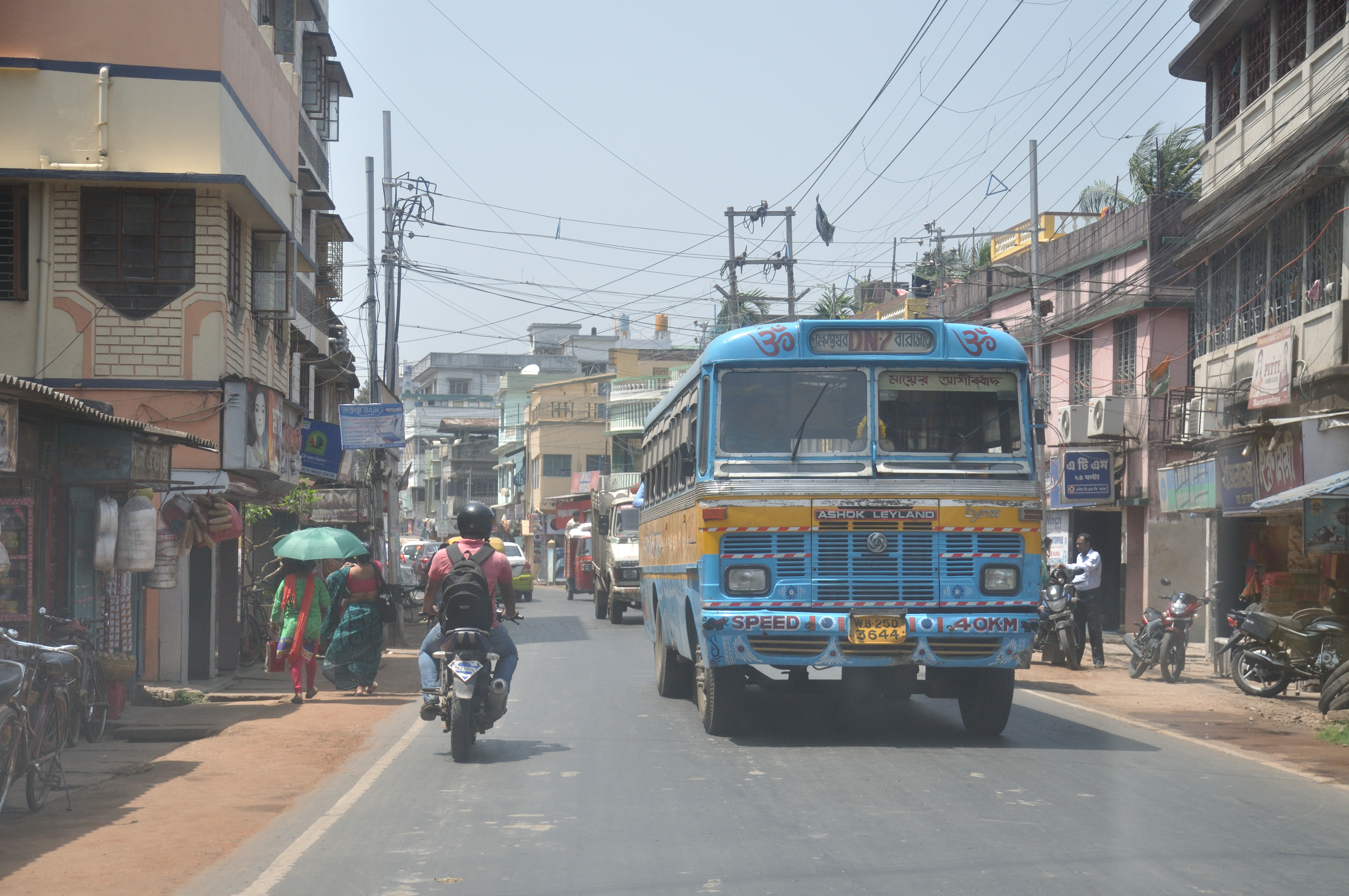
Madhusudan Banerjee Road (M.B Road), Birati

Durganagar, Birati and Bisharpara Kodaliya railway stations on the Sealdah-Bangaon line besides Belgharia railway station on the Sealdah-Ranaghat line are the nearest railway stations.

== Education ==
The following institutions are located in North Dum Dum:

- Mrinalini Datta Mahavidyapith was established by Birati Shiksha Sansad at Birati in 1964. It offers honours courses in Bengali, English, Sanskrit, history, political science, philosophy, education, sociology, geography, journalism & mass communication, economics, anthropology, physics, mathematics, computer science, botany, zoology, accountancy and BBA. It also offers general courses in arts, science and commerce, and post graduation in Bengali. It caters to the needs of 18,000 students from Birati and the surrounding areas.
- Uttar Dum Dum Vidyapith for Boys (H.S) and Uttar Dum Dum Vidyapith for Girls (H.S) are higher secondary schools established by Birati Siksha Sansad at Birati in 1954.
- Birati Vidyalaya for Boys and Birati Vidyalaya for Girls are higher secondary schools at Birati.
- Birati High School is a boys higher secondary school. Being one of the earliest boys schools in North Dum Dum, it has a very spacious campus facilitating the various academic needs of the science and commerce students. The school has a big library, computer room, chemistry, physics, biology labs and a huge playground for various sports activities.
- Nimta High School at Nimta is a boys-only higher secondary school. It was established in 1875.
- Udaypur Haradayal Nag Adarsha Vidyalaya for Boys (H.S) and Udaypur Haradayal Nag Adarsha Vidyalaya for Girls (H.S) are higher secondary schools at Nimta.
- Shyamaprasad Nagar High School at Nimta is a co-educational higher secondary school.
- Nimta Jibantosh Memorial Girls High School is a girls higher secondary school at Nimta.
- Nimta Ishan Chandra Balika Vidyalaya is a girls high school at Nimta.
- Rishi Aurobindo Memorial Academy at P.K.Guha Road (near Airport Gate No. 1), is an English-medium co-educational ICSE school.
- St. Stephen’s School, at R.B.C. Road, is a co-educational English-medium school, that has produced toppers in both ICSE and ISC examination. Managed by the Barrackpore Diocesan Education Society, it was established in 1971. It is the main school with 18 branches.
- Indira Gandhi Memorial High School, at P.K.Guha Road, is an English-medium coeducational school affiliated to the CBSE. It was established in 1996 and has facilities for teaching in Classes Nursery to XII.
- Birati Mahajati Vidyamandir For Boys' (H.S.). It is located at Mahajati Nagar in Birati. Near Punjab & Sind Bank. It is established in 1968.
- Birati Mahajati Balika Vidyamandir (H.S.). It is located at Mahajati Nagar in Birati. It is established in 1956.
- Durganagar Nepal Chandra Vidyapith High School (H.S) is a higher secondary school at School Rd, Durganagar.
- Durganagar High School (H.S) is a higher secondary school at Rabindra Sarani, North Durganagar.
- Swarnamayee Smriti Vidyalaya High School is a high school at Nirmal Sengupta Sarani, East Durganagar.
- Khalisakota Adarsha Vidyalaya for Girls' (H.S) is a higher secondary school at Khalisakota Pally, P.O Italgacha.
- Khalisakota Adarsha Vidyalaya for Boys (H.S) is a higher secondary school at Khalisakota Pally, P.O Rajbari.

== Healthcare ==
- North Dum Dum Municipality Hospital, 96C, Madhusudan Banerjee Rd, (Mahajati Nagar, Birati) North Dumdum, Kolkata 700051 (Hernia, Appendix, Piles, Phimosis, Ortho Surgery, Laprosopic Surgery, Eye).
- Dr. B.K. Memorial Hospital, Madhusudan Banerjee Rd (near Nimta High School), North Dumdum, Kolkata 700049 (Multidisciplinary Hospital).
- Health Pillar Hospitals, Belgharia Expressway (near Airport Gate No 3), North Dumdum, Kolkata 700081 (Multi-speciality Hospital).

== Markets ==
Major markets in Uttar Dum Dum:

- Durganagar Market
- Menu Chatterjee Market
- Jodu Babur Bazar
- Siddheshwari Bazar
- Nilachal Bazaar
- Pathanpur Natun Bazar
- Nimta Majherhati Bazaar
- Nimta Golbagan Market
- Nimta Bazar
- Nimta Alipur Bazar
- 6 no. Railgate Bazar

== Infrastructure ==
As per the District Census Handbook 2011, North Dumdum municipal city covered an area of 26.45 km^{2} (10.21 sq mi). Amongst the civic amenities it had both open and closed drains. Amongst the educational facilities It had 56 primary schools and 18 secondary schools. Amongst the social, recreational and cultural facilities it had 1 auditorium/ community hall and 3 public libraries. It had 9 bank branches.

== See also ==
- Dum Dum
- South Dumdum
- Barrackpore subdivision
