= Durganagar, Kolkata =

Durganagar
- Neighbourhood
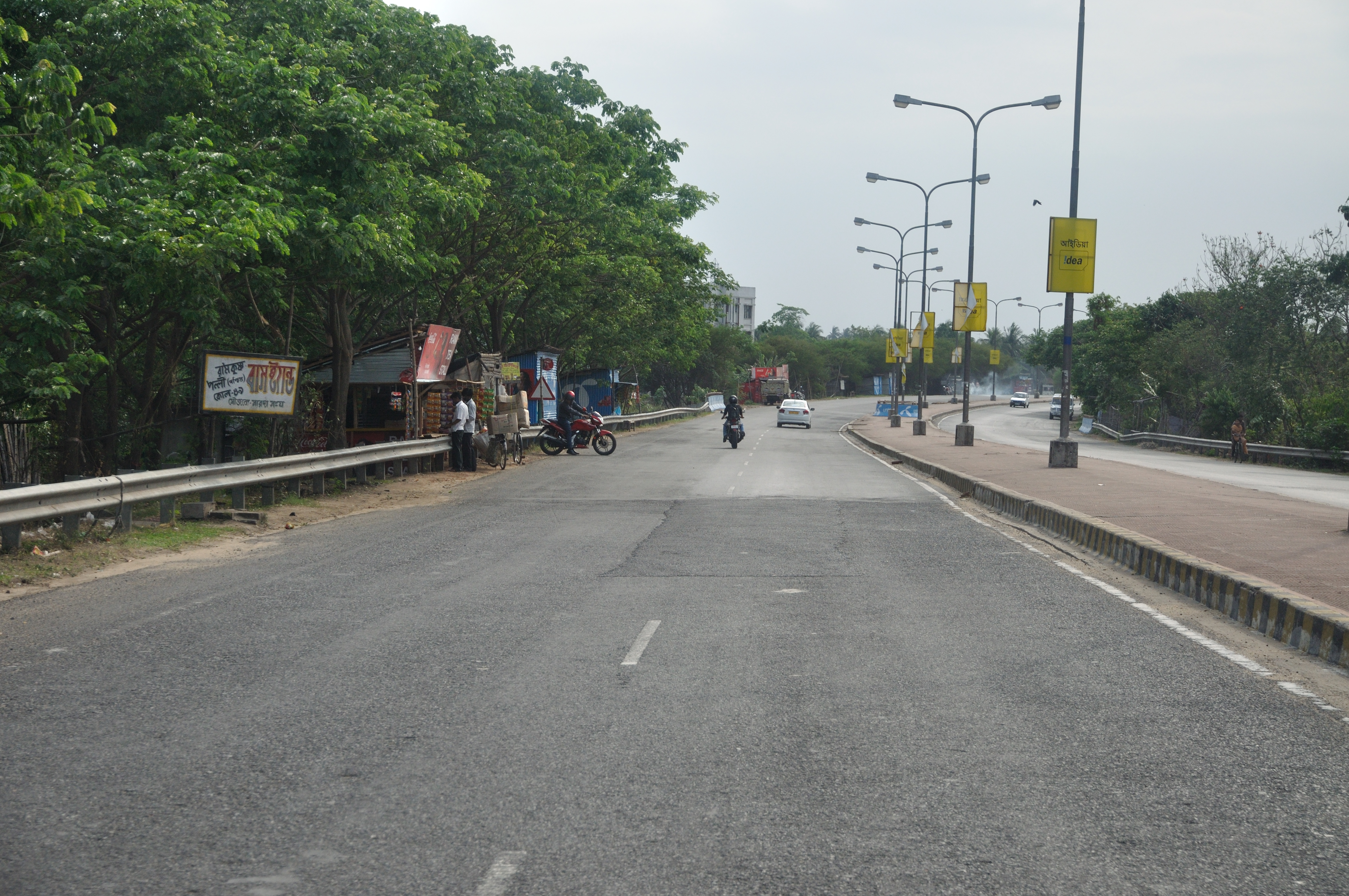
- Belghoria Expressway, Durganagar

- Location in West Bengal, India Durganagar (West Bengal) Durganagar (India)
- Coordinates: 22.6531°N 88.4194°E
- Country: India
- State: West Bengal
- Division: Presidency
- District: North 24 Parganas
- Metro Station: Dum Dum Cantonment; Jai Hind
- Railway Station: Durganagar

Government
  - Type: Municipality
  - Body: North Dumdum Municipality

Languages
  - Official: Bengali, English
- Time zone: UTC+5:30 (IST)
- PIN: 700065, 700049, 700079
- Telephone code: +91 33
- Vehicle registration: WB
- Lok Sabha constituency: Dum Dum
- Vidhan Sabha constituency: Dum Dum Uttar
- Website: northdumdummunicipality.org

Durganagar is a locality in North Dumdum of North 24 Parganas district in the Indian state of West Bengal. It is a part of the area covered by Kolkata Metropolitan Development Authority (KMDA).

== Geography ==
It is flanked by Birati and Nimta areas in the north, Netaji Subhash Chandra Bose International Airport in the east, area of Belgharia and adjoining areas of Dakshineswar in the west and the posh areas of Dum Dum Cantonment and Dum Dum Cantonment metro station in the south.

Durganagar is a part of the North Dum Dum Municipality. Previously it was known as Sultanpur. Durganagar area is situated in the northern suburbs of the Kolkata Metropolitan Area. It is about 6.2 km from Dakshineswar Kali Temple and 1 km west of Netaji Subhas Chandra Bose International Airport.

=== Police station ===
Nimta police station under the Barrackpore Police Commissionerate have jurisdiction over North Dumdum Municipal areas.

=== Post office ===
Durganagar has a non-delivery sub post office, with PIN 700065 in the Kolkata North Division of North 24 Parganas district in Calcutta region.

== Education ==
Prominent schools in Durganagar and surrounding areas are as follows:

- Durganagar Nepal Chandra Vidyapith High School (H.S) at School Rd, Durganagar
- Durganagar High School (H.S) at Rabindra Sarani, North Durganagar.
- Swarnamayee Smriti Vidyalaya High School at Nirmal Sengupta Sarani, Manikpur.
- Khalisakota Adarsha Vidyalaya for Girls' (H.S) at Khalisakota Pally, P.O Italgacha.
- Khalisakota Adarsha Vidyalaya for Boys (H.S) at Khalisakota Pally, P.O Rajbari.
- Nalta Mahajati High School for Girls (H.S) and Nalta Mahajati High School for Boys (H.S) at Nalta School Rd, Dum Dum Cantonment.
- Uttar Rabindranagar Vivekananda High School (H.S) at Vivekananda Pally, Rabindra Nagar (N), Dum Dum Cantonment.

== Transport ==
Durganagar has good transportation facilities. Belghoria Expressway (locally known as Delhi Road) passes through Durganagar. It is very close to the Dumdum/Kolkata Airport.

Durganagar railway station on the Sealdah-Bangaon line is the nearest railway station.

Dum Dum Cantonment metro station and Biman Bandar metro station of Yellow Line of Kolkata Metro are the nearest metro stations.

=== Bus ===
Buses ply along Belghoria Expressway are:

==== WBTC Bus ====
- AC23A Rajchandrapur - Salt Lake Karunamoyee
- AC50A Rajchandrapur - Garia 6 no. Bus stand
- ACT-23 Park Circus - Dankuni
- C23 Park Circus - Dankuni
- S23A Rajchandrapur - Salt Lake Karunamoyee

==== Private Bus ====
- 285 Serampore - Salt Lake Sector-V
- DN2/1 Dakshineswar - New Town
- DN9/1 Barasat - Dakshineswar
- DN44 Dakshineswar - Bangaon
- DN46 Dankuni Housing - Salt Lake Karunamoyee

Many unnumbered shuttle buses also pass through Durganagar along Belghoria Expressway.

== Culture ==
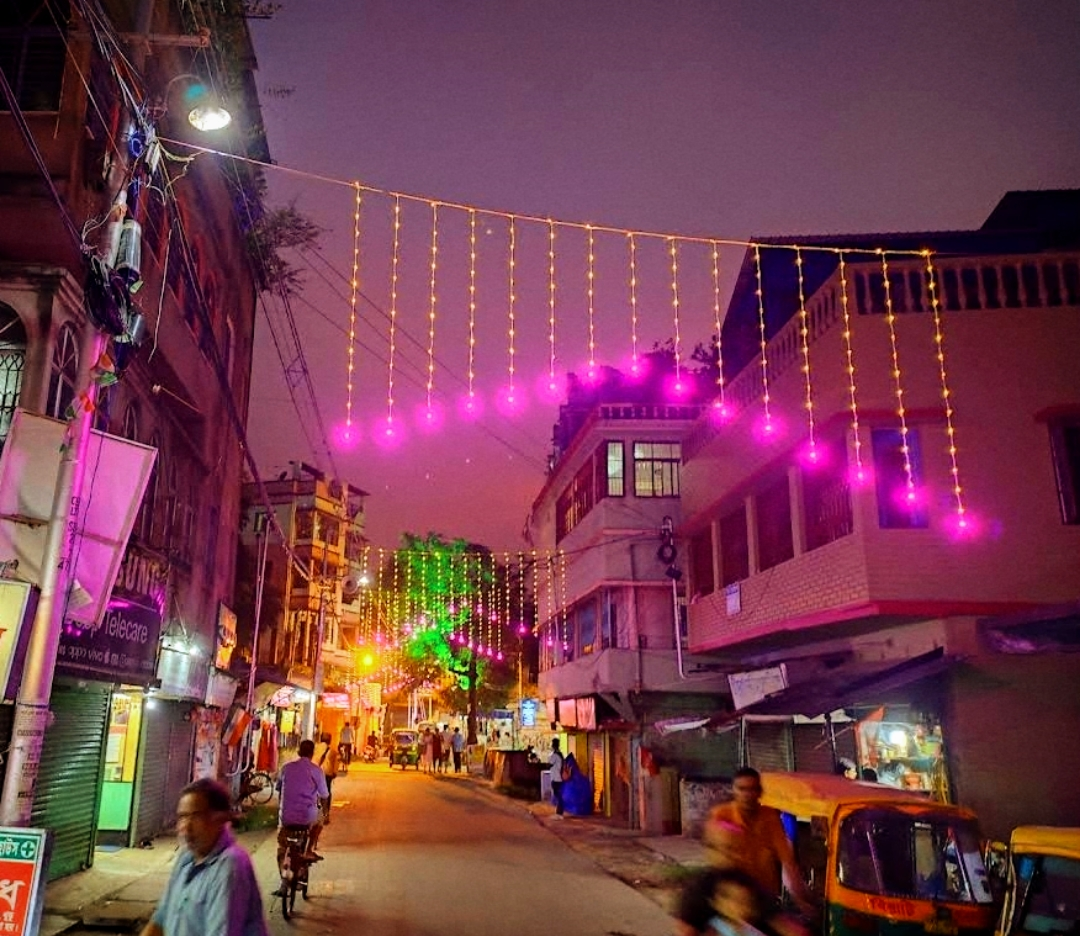
Durganagar streets during Durga Puja

Kolkata’s reverence and love for Goddess Durga are known facts. This reverence yet again takes centerstage as the locality is popularly known to be named after the goddess herself. Durga Puja in Durganagar has been organised by various local clubs such as Durganagar Sporting Club, Alok Sangha Club, Badra Agragami Club, Durganagar Bandhu Milan Sangha, Durganagar Aikatan Club and others.

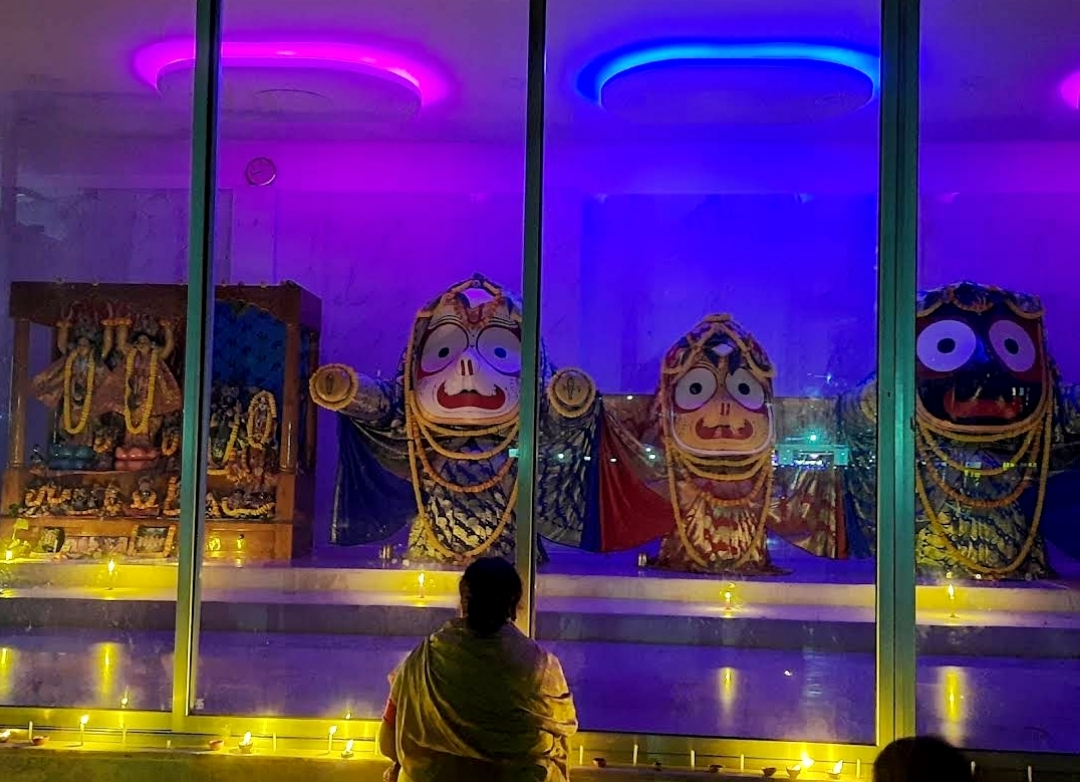
Sri Jagannath Radha Madanmohan Temple, ISKCON Durganagar

Sri Jagannath Radha Madanmohan Temple has been established by ISKCON at Durganagar near Belghoria Expressway or Delhi Road. Every year religious procession has been organised here during Ratha Yatra with great enthusiasm. Hindus celebrate a lot of festivals and follow a lot of traditions and rituals throughout the year. One among all the Hindu festivals is the Krishna Janmashtami, this festival has been celebrated at Sri Jagannath Radha Madanmohan Temple by ISKCON with a lot of devotion.

== Markets ==
Markets in Durganagar area are:

- Durganagar Market
- Menu Chatterjee Market
- Shibtala Bazar

== Notable residents ==
Bhaskar Ganguly

- Bhaskar Ganguly is a former Indian football goalkeeper from Durganagar, West Bengal. He was the captain of India national football team which participated in the 1982 Asian Games held in New Delhi.
- Gourav Roy - Gourav Roy is a phd from prestigious MICA Ahmedabad and a post doctoral researcher at IIT Madras (Source https://sciprofiles.com/profile/3318043) Dr Roy has been known for his academic achievements, and efficient conceptualization of his research. He frequently appears in leading management conferences and his research is published in leading marketing journals. Apart from an academican he is also a philanthropist who aspires to abridge the existing gap between poverty and wealth.

https://www.scilit.com/scholars/20296765

== See also ==
- Dum Dum Cantonment metro station
- North Dum Dum
- Dum Dum
