= List of expressways in West Bengal =

This is a list of expressways in the Indian state of West Bengal. The list is divided into following categories:

- National Expressway: Built by NHAI, these expressways connect two or more different states and have been declared as "National Expressways" (NE) by Government of India.
- Intrastate Expressway: Built by NHAI, these expressways run entirely through the state (West Bengal) and connects areas within the state. These are declared as expressways by Government of India.
- Bypass Expressway: Built by NHAI, these expressways runs through the outskirts or metropolitan area of a city to bypass the city core. West Bengal has bypass expressways only around Kolkata. These are declared as expressways by Government of India.
- State Expressway: Built by the West Bengal Highway Development Corporation (WBHDCL) and declared as expressways by Government of West Bengal, not by Government of India. Although, they have similar characteristics as NHAI expressways.

Legends
Fully operational Under construction Partially operational and partially under construction Planned but construction not started Proposed

== National Expressways by NHAI ==
Name	Mark	Part of	Endpoints in WB	Length (km)	Lanes	Status	Ref(s)
Kharagpur-Burdwan-Moregram Expressway	NE-9	EC14	Kharagpur to Moregram	230	4	Under construction (as of 2026)	
Varanasi–Kolkata Expressway	NE-8	NH-319B	Purulia to Kolkata	242	6	Under construction (as of 2026)	
Kharagpur Visakhapatnam Expressway			Kharagpur		6	Tender released (as of September 2024)	
Katihar-Kishanganj-Siliguri-Guwahati Expressway	NE-10		Siliguri			Planned (as of 2024)	
Patna Kolkata Expressway			Kolkata			Planned (as of 2024)	
Gorakhpur–Siliguri Expressway			Uttar Dinajpur to Siliguri	519	4	Land acquisition in process (as of 2026)	
Haldia–Raxaul Expressway			Haldia	650		Land acquisition in process (as of 2026)	

== Intrastate Expressways by NHAI ==
Name	Part of	Endpoints	Length (km)	Lanes	Status	Ref(s)
Durgapur Expressway	AH1 NH19	Dankuni - Durgapur	168	6	Almost operational (except some intersections) as of 2024	
Kona Expressway	NH12	Hastings, Kolkata - NH16, Nibra, Howrah	11	6	At grade road operational and elevated corridor under construction (as of 2024)	

== Bypass Expressways (by NHAI) ==
Name	Part of	Endpoints in WB	Length (km)	Lanes	Status	Ref(s)
Belghoria Expressway	AH1 NH12	Dankuni to Kolkata airport	16	4	Fully operational	

== State expressways by WBHDCL ==
Name	Part of	Endpoints in WB	Length (km)	Lanes	Status	Ref(s)
Kalyani Expressway		NH12 at Nimta, Kolkata - Ishwar Gupta Setu, Kalyani	42	4-6	Mostly operational except-New Ishwar Gupta Bridge (as of June-2026)	

== See also ==
- Expressways in India
