= Birati railway station =

Railway station in West Bengal, India

Birati
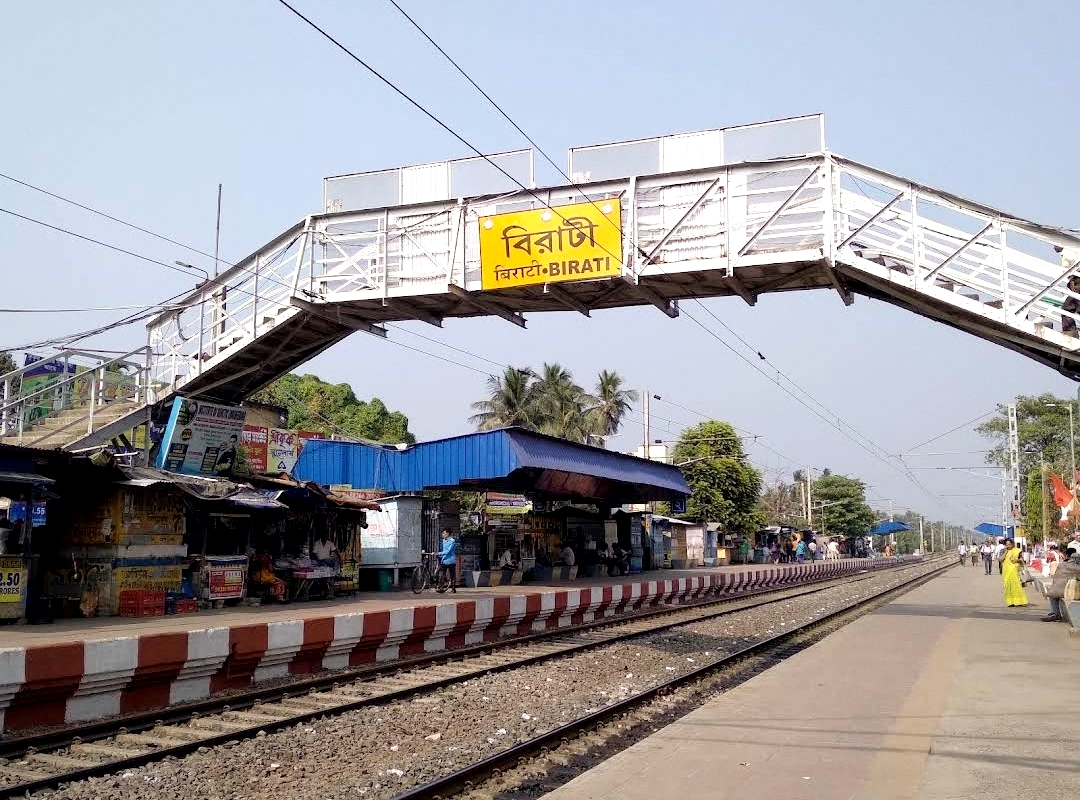

General information
- Location: Birati, North Dumdum, West Bengal 700051; India
- Coordinates: 22.664136°N 88.427360°E
- Elevation: 10 metres (33 ft)
- System: Kolkata Suburban Railway station
- Owner: Indian Railways
- Operator: Eastern Railway
- Line: Sealdah–Hasnabad–Bangaon–Ranaghat line of Kolkata Suburban Railway
- Platforms: 3
- Tracks: 3

Construction
- Structure type: At grade
- Parking: Not available
- Cycle facilities: Not available

Other information
- Status: Active
- Station code: BBT
- Zone(s): Eastern Railway
- Division(s): Sealdah

History
- Opened: 1906; 120 years ago
- Electrified: 1972; 54 years ago

Services
Preceding station	Kolkata Suburban Railway	Following station
Durganagar towards Sealdah	Eastern Line Dum Dum–Bangaon branch line	Bisharpara Kodaliya towards Bangaon Junction
Route map
Location
- Location within Kolkata Location within West Bengal

Birati railway station is a Kolkata Suburban Railway station in Birati. It serves Birati and Nimta areas in North Dumdum, West Bengal, India. It lies between the Durganagar railway station and Bisharpara Kodaliya railway station. Madhusudan Banerjee Road connects the Barrackpore Trunk Road and Jessore Road through Birati.

== History ==
In 1882-84, the Bengal Central Railway company built a railway from Dumdum to Khulna (at present, this line is the part of Bangladesh). Passenger rail services are operational between Sealdah and Bangaon on the Indian section of this railway. The East Bengal Railway main line from Sealdah to Ranaghat was opened in 1862 and extended to Kushtia in present-day Bangladesh within two months. Subsequently, the Bengal Central Railway Company constructed Ranaghat-Bangaon line in 1882–84 to connect the Sealdah-Bangaon line with the Sealdah-Ranaghat line.

== Connectivity ==
It is well connected to the Birati Mini Bus Terminal. Autos and totos are available from Belgharia to Birati through MB road.

== Railway ==
Birati railway station is located on the Sealdah - Bangaon railway line that stretches between Kolkata district and North 24 Parganas district. This railway consists of 4 rail lines or rail tracks from Sealdah to Dum Dum and 2 from Dum Dum to Bangaon.

== Station complex ==
The platform is not very well sheltered. It has many facilities including drinking water and sanitation. There are three platforms - 1, 2 and 3. Platform 1 is used for the down local trains heading towards Sealdah Railway Station and Platform 3 is used for the up local trains heading towards Bangaon Junction railway station. Platform 2 is used for goods trains and its not generally used for local trains.

== Electrification ==
The Sealdah–Dum Dum–Barasat–Ashok Nagar–Bangaon route was electrified in 1972.

== Railway Service ==
This station provides rail services to the surrounding area of the station. Trains approach for Bangaon, Hasnabad and Sealdah, Barasat and Majherhat run through this station. Local trains of Kolkata Suburban Railway serve rail passengers daily at this station.

== Securities ==
All the responsibilities of station management are vested in the head of the station "Station Master". Apart from this, temporary mobile GRP personnel are employed for the security of the station and its premises. The security of the adjoining areas is provided by the local police administration.

== See also ==
- North 24 Parganas district
- Indian Railways
- Sealdah
- Sealdah–Hasnabad–Bangaon–Ranaghat line
- Bangaon Junction
- Transport in West Bengal
- List of railway stations in India
