= Belgharia railway station =

Railway station in West Bengal, India

Belgharia
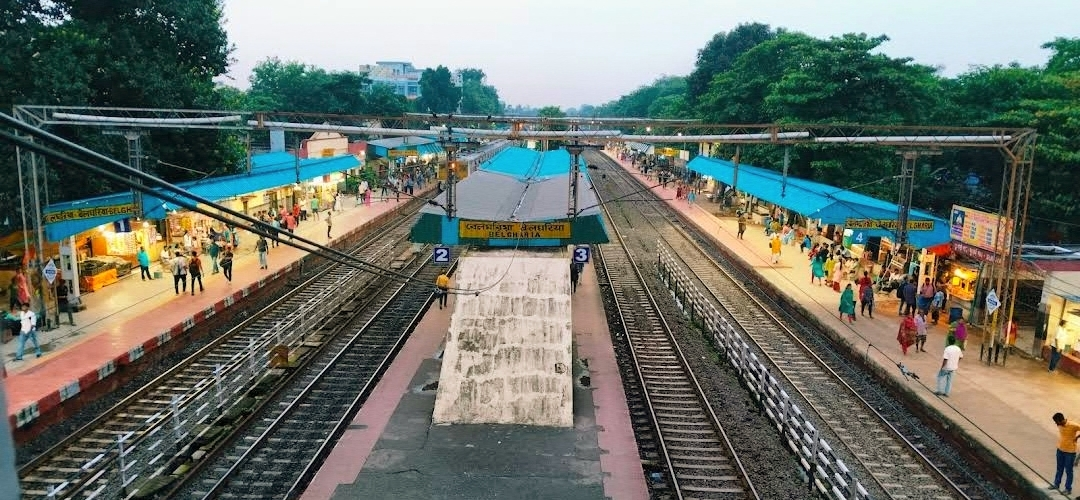
- Belgharia railway station

General information
- Location: Belgharia, Kolkata, West Bengal 700056; India
- Coordinates: 22°39′41″N 88°23′21″E
- Elevation: 10 metres (33 ft)
- System: Kolkata Suburban Railway
- Owner: Indian Railways
- Operator: Eastern Railway
- Line: Sealdah–Ranaghat line of Kolkata Suburban Railway
- Platforms: 4
- Tracks: 4

Construction
- Structure type: At grade
- Parking: Available for bicycles & motorcycles

Other information
- Status: Active
- Station code: BLH
- Zone(s): Eastern Railway
- Division(s): Sealdah

History
- Opened: 1862; 164 years ago
- Electrified: 1963–1965; 61 years ago

Services
Preceding station	Kolkata Suburban Railway	Following station
Dum Dum Junction towards Sealdah	Eastern Line Main line	Agarpara towards Ranaghat Junction
Route map
Location
- Location within Kolkata Location within West Bengal

Belgharia railway station is a Kolkata Suburban Railway station on the Sealdah–Ranaghat line. It serves Belgharia, Nimta and surrounding areas. It situates between the Dum Dum Junction railway station and the Agarpara railway station.

== History ==
The main line from Sealdah to Ranaghat by Eastern Bengal Railway was opened to railway traffic in the year 1862 and extended to Kushtia in present-day Bangladesh within two months. The Sealdah–Kusthia line of the Eastern Bengal Railway used to work only on the eastern side of the Hooghly River.

== Railway ==
This railway station and its track is located on the Sealdah Ranaghat railway line that stretches between Kolkata district, North 24 Parganas district and Nadia district. This railway currently has 4 tracks from Sealdah to Naihati Junction and 2 tracks from Naihati Junction to Ranaghat Junction.

The track of this station is classified as C-class track, is not a speed classification. But it is used for suburban rail services in metropolitan areas.

== Station complex ==
The infrastructure of the station is terrestrial. The railway platform is almost fully sheltered. At the station, the building for station management and the station master's building are located adjacent to the platform no. 1. The station has two ticket counters one is outside the platform no. 4 and another is on platform no. 1. Passengers are issued tickets from those platforms by station ticket officers for train travel.

The Down Train leaves from platform no. 2 and 4. On the other hand, the Up Train leaves from platform no. 1 and 3. There are many approach roads to this station. The Madhusudan Banarjee Road from Birati side connects the Feeder Road from Barrackpore Trunk Road side and Jessore Road through the railway station Belgharia.

There are auto rickshaw stands, E-rickshaw stands outside Platform 1 and Platform 4. All the platforms are connected with subway and foot-over bridge. The station has seating, toilet, drinking water facilities for passenger convenience. There is no four wheels vehicles parking facility at the station. But available only for bicycles and motorcycles..

== Electrification ==
Most local passenger trains are electric trains and run on the tracks of Agarpara railway station. Electrification of this railway through the Sealdah–Ranaghat line was completed in 1963–1965.

== Rail Service ==
This station provides rail services to its surrounding area of the station. Trains approach for Ranaghat, Kalyani Simanta, Gede, Sealdah and Majerhat run through this station. Local trains of Kolkata Suburban Railway serve rail passengers daily at this station.

== Securities ==
Belgharia railway station belongs to Sealdah Railway Division of Eastern Railway Zone of Indian Railways. All the responsibilities of station management are given on the head of the station "Station Master". Apart from this, temporary mobile GRP personnel are employed for the security of the station and its premises. There is a GRP office on platform no. 1. The security of station adjoining areas is provided by the local police administration.

== See also ==
- Agarpara railway station
- Dum Dum Junction railway station
- Sealdah railway station
- Howrah railway station, the oldest and the busiest railway station of India.
