= Nimta =

- Neighbourhood
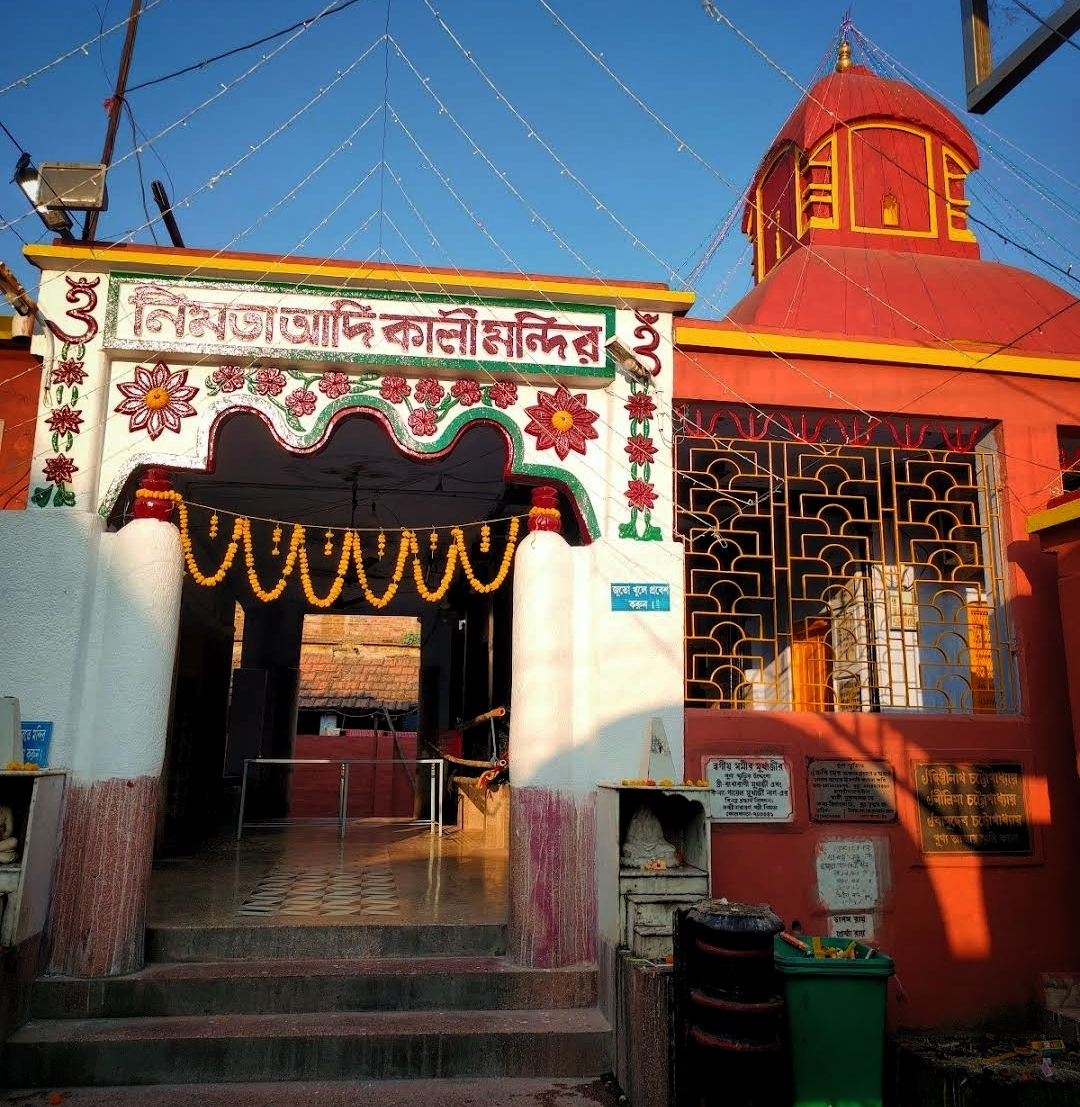
- Nimta Adi Kalibari

- Location in West Bengal, India Nimta (West Bengal) Nimta (India)
- Coordinates: 22.6626°N 88.4090°E
- Country: India
- State: West Bengal
- Division: Presidency
- District: North 24 Parganas
- Railway Station: Belgharia; Birati; Durganagar

Government
  - Type: Municipality
  - Body: North Dumdum Municipality

Languages
  - Official: Bengali, English
- Time zone: UTC+5:30 (IST)
- PIN: 700049
- Telephone code: +91 33
- Vehicle registration: WB
- Lok Sabha constituency: Dum Dum
- Vidhan Sabha constituency: Dum Dum Uttar
- Website: north24parganas.nic.in

Nimta is a locality in North Dumdum in Barrackpore II block of the North 24 Parganas district in the state of West Bengal, India. It is a part of the area covered by Kolkata Metropolitan Development Authority (KMDA).

== History ==
According to historical data, Nimta is older than Calcutta. It is under Greater Kolkata (North 24 Parganas - 700049). This census town stands next to the very old road Madhusudan Banerjee Road (MB Road). This area is very densely populated. It is a region with glorious tradition of political change in then Bengal, known as 'GOUR', Nimta also felt the impact of cultural and religious changes like other parts of Bengal. It is believed by some historians that a Buddhist monastery existed at Nimta during the pre-Sultanite period. In the sixteenth century, Nityananda Mahaprabhu came to Nimta to spread the teachings of Mahaprabhu Chaitanya. A Navadwip approved 'Toll' i.e. primary level teaching place was set up here. It came to be known as 'Nimta Toll'. Famous writer Ram Ram Bose who wrote 'Keri Sahiber Munshi' started his studies from this 'Nimta Tol'. Nimta also witnessed the birth of poet Krishna Ramdas, the author of the famous books 'Rai Mangal' and 'Kalika Mangal'. Nimta is blessed as the birthplace of the great poet Satyendranath Dutta who won the accolade of none other than Gurudev Rabindranath Tagore. Tagore gave him the title 'Chandar Jadukar' (Wizard of Rhyme) for his excellent verses. Savarna Roy Chowdhury, a great zamindar of Bengal, stayed in Nimta for some time. Internationally renowned Kathak dancer, Rama Prasad Chatterjee lived here. Nimta High School (1875) is a traditional school in West Bengal which is still educating students. The famous temple of Nimta, called Nimta Kalibari is another oldest temple. Another Hindu temple, Sri Sri Radha Gobinda Sebasram is very popular here. Nowadays Nimta is very important and busy town in Greater Kolkata.

== Geography ==
=== Police station ===
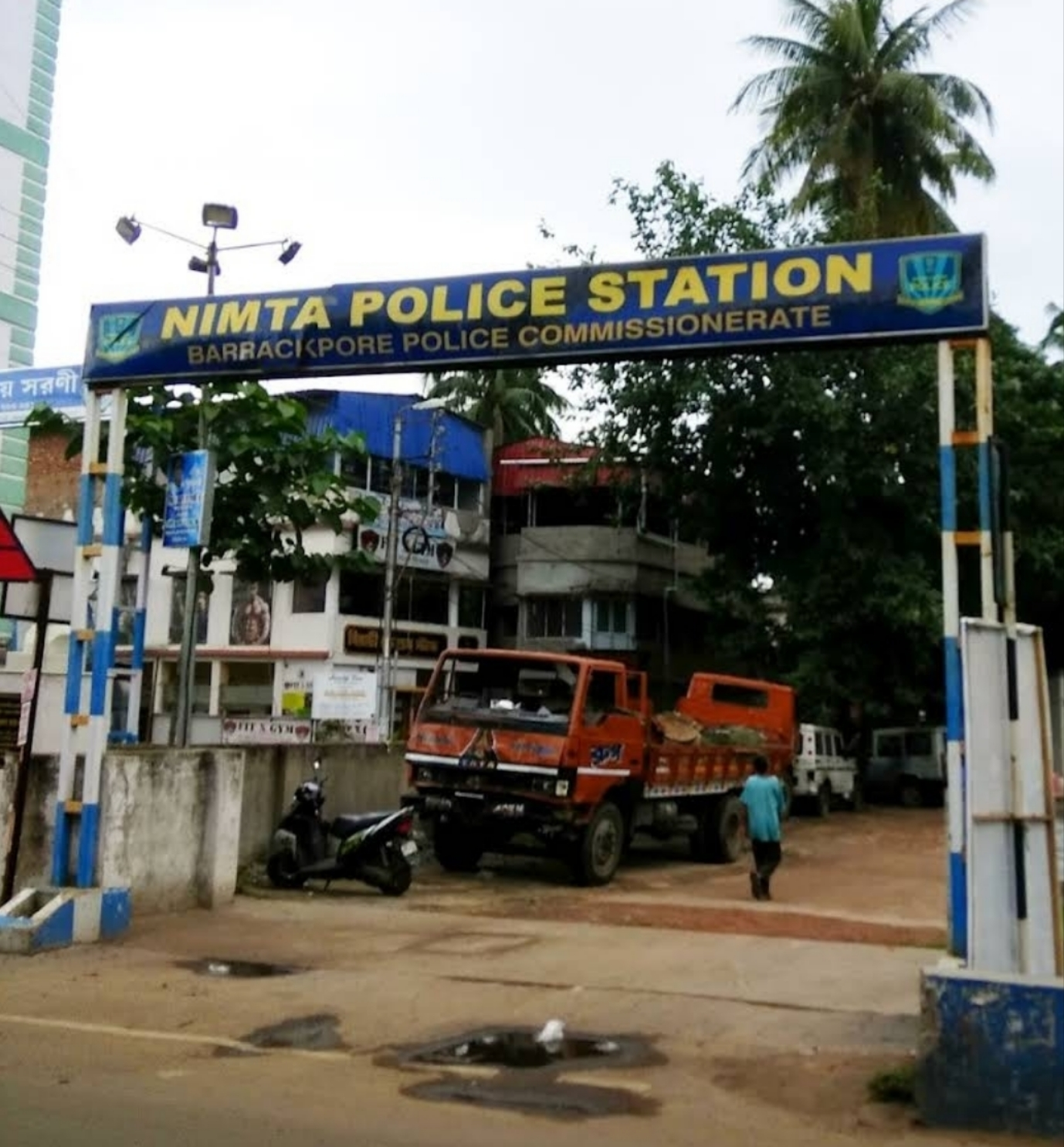
Nimta Police Station

Nimta police station under Barrackpore Police Commissionerate has jurisdiction over North Dum Dum Municipal areas.

=== Post Office ===
Nimta has a delivery sub post office, with PIN 700049 in the North Presidency Division of North 24 Parganas district in Calcutta region. The only other post offices with the same PIN is Udaipur.

== Education ==
The following schools are located in Nimta & Nearby:

- ITI Institute at Udaipur, Nimta.
- Nimta High School at Nimta is a boys only higher secondary school. It was established in 1875.
- Udaypur Haradayal Nag Adarsha Vidyalaya.
- Udaypur Haradayal Nag Adarsha Vidyalaya for Girls.
- Belgharia Mahakali Girls High School.
- Jatiya Vidyaniketan Girls High School.
- Jatin Das Vidyamandir for Boys.
- Jatin Das Vidyamandir for Girls.
- Nimta Alipur Vidyamandir.
- St. Stephen's School, Birati.
- Udaypur Adarsha Vidyalaya Unit 3
- Shyamaprasad Nagar High School at Nimta is a co-educational higher secondary school.
- Nimta Jibantosh Memorial Girls High School is a girls higher secondary school.
- Nimta Ishan Chandra Balika Vidyalaya is a girls high school.

== Transport ==
=== Road ===
Nimta is located at the southern terminus of Kalyani Expressway. Madhusudan Banerjee Road (M.B. Road) connects Nimta with Belgharia (westwards) and Birati and Jessore Road (eastwards).

=== Bus ===
==== Private Bus ====
- 201 Nimta Post Office - Salt Lake

==== Mini Bus ====
- S185 Nimta Paikpara - Howrah Station

=== Railways ===
The nearest railway stations to Nimta are as follows:

- Belgharia railway station
- Birati railway station
- Durganagar railway station

=== Auto Routes ===
- Nimta Alipore to Belgharia, Durganagar
- Nimta Paikpara to Belgharia
- Alipore Kalabagan to Belgharia
- Nimta Adarshanagar to Belgharia
- Belgharia to Birati (via Nimta M.B Rd)
- Mathkal Bus Stop to Noapara Metro

== Markets ==
Markets in Nimta areas are:

- Nimta Bazar
- Nimta Majherhati Bazaar
- Nimta Golbagan Market
- Nimta Alipur Bazar
- Menu Chatterjee Market
- Rabindranagar Bazar, Nimta
- Nimta Pathanpur Bazar.

== See also ==
- Belgharia
- Birati
- Durganagar
