= North Dum Dum Municipality =

Municipal Corporation in West Bengal, India

North Dum Dum Municipality উত্তর দমদম পৌরসভা
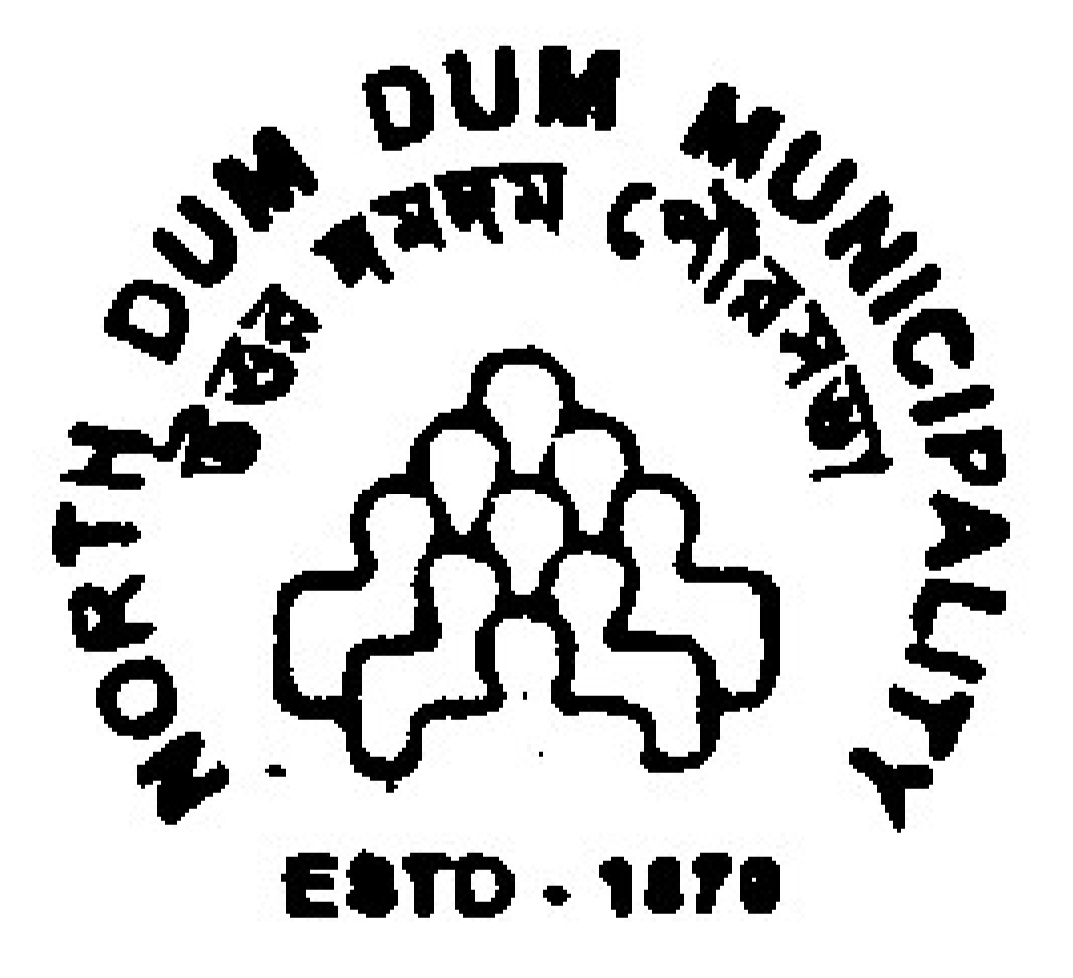
- Coat of Arms

Type
- Type: Municipality

History
- Founded: 1870; 156 years ago

Leadership
- Chairman: Bidhan Biswas, AITC
- Vice Chairman: Lopamudra Dutta Chowdhury, AITC

Structure
- Seats: 34
- Political groups: Government (33): AITC (33); Opposition (1): CPI(M) (1)

Elections
- Last election: 2022
- Next election: 2027

Website
- www.northdumdummunicipality.org

North Dum Dum Municipality is the civic body that governs North Dumdum areas (Birati, Durganagar, Nimta and Bisharpara) in the Barrackpore subdivision of North 24 Parganas district in West Bengal, India.

== Administration and Councillors (2027 onwards) ==
Elections are scheduled for 2027.

== Administration and Councillors (2022-2027) ==
Administration			Notes
Chairman	Bidhan Biswas		Resigned in 2026
Vice Chairman	Lopamudra Chowdhury		Resigned in 2026
Chairman-in-Council	1. Soumen Dutta; 2. Bindu Madhav Das; 3. Debashish Ghosh; 4. Mahua Sil; 5. Basanti Dey Biswas		Resigned in 2026
Ward No.	Councillor	Party	
1	Debashish Ghosh	AITC	
2	Rita Adhikary	AITC	
3	Pinku Kr. Bhowmick	AITC	
4	Sultana Banu	AITC	
5	Mita Das Kar	AITC	
6	Soumita Das Roy	AITC	
7	Tapash Kar	AITC	
8	Nila Mitra	AITC	
9	Basanti Dey Biswas	AITC	
10	Bindu Madhab Das	AITC	
11	Lisha Ghosh	AITC	
12	Soumen Dutta	AITC	
13	Prasanta Saha	AITC	
14	Shelly Halder	AITC	
15	Sandhya Rani Mondol	CPIM	
16	Ashok Kr. Biswas	AITC	
17	Mahua Sil	AITC	
18	Aditi Mukherjee	AITC	
19	Subodh Chakraborty	AITC	
20	Bina Bhowmick	AITC	
21	Anjana Bose	AITC	
22	Prodyut Kr. Biswas	AITC	
23	Sankar Das	AITC	
24	Goutam Karanjai	AITC	
25	Bidhan Biswas	AITC	
26	Sukla Chatterjee	AITC	
27	Rajarshi Basu	AITC	
28	Kalyan Kar	AITC	
29	Milu Roychowdhury	AITC	
30	Tapan Chakraborty	AITC	
31	Sujay Das	AITC	
32	Lopamudra Dutta Chowdhury	AITC	
33	Supriya Biswas	AITC	
34	Sk. Nazimuddin	AITC	
