= Durganagar railway station =

Railway station in West Bengal, India

Durganagar
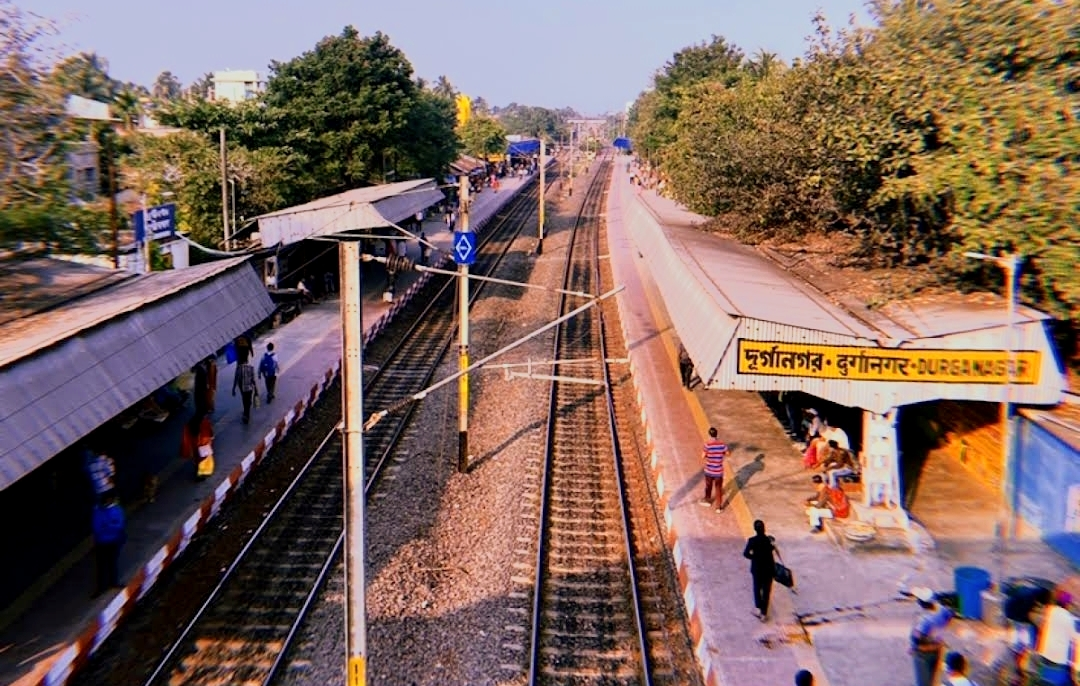

General information
- Location: Durganagar Station Rd, North Dumdum, Kolkata, West Bengal 700065; India
- Coordinates: 22.650472°N 88.419123°E
- Elevation: 5 metres (16 ft)
- System: Kolkata Suburban Railway Station
- Owner: Indian Railways
- Operator: Eastern Railway
- Lines: Kolkata Suburban Railway; Sealdah–Hasnabad–Bangaon–Ranaghat line
- Platforms: 2
- Tracks: 2

Construction
- Structure type: At grade
- Parking: No
- Cycle facilities: Yes

Other information
- Status: Active
- Station code: DGNR
- Zone(s): Eastern Railway
- Division(s): Sealdah

History
- Opened: 1882; 144 years ago
- Electrified: 1963; 63 years ago

Services
Preceding station	Kolkata Suburban Railway	Following station
Dum Dum Cantonment towards Sealdah	Eastern Line Dum Dum–Bangaon branch line	Birati towards Bangaon Junction
Route map
Location
- Location within Kolkata Location within West Bengal

Durganagar is a Kolkata Suburban Railway station in Durganagar. Its code is DGNR. It serves Durganagar, Manikpur, Badra and surrounding areas. The station consists of two platforms. The platforms are not very well sheltered.

== Station ==
=== Location ===
Durganagar is located on Sealdah–Hasnabad–Bangaon–Ranaghat line of Kolkata Suburban Railway. Link between Dum Dum to Khulna now in Bangladesh, via Bangaon was constructed by Bengal Central Railway Company in 1882–84. The Sealah–Dum Dum–Barasat–Ashok Nagar–Bangaon sector was electrified in 1963–64.

== See also ==
- North 24 Parganas district
- Indian Railways
- Sealdah
- Sealdah–Hasnabad–Bangaon–Ranaghat line
- Bangaon Junction
- Transport in West Bengal
- List of railway stations in India
