= Birati =

Neighbourhood of Kolkata, India

- Neighbourhood
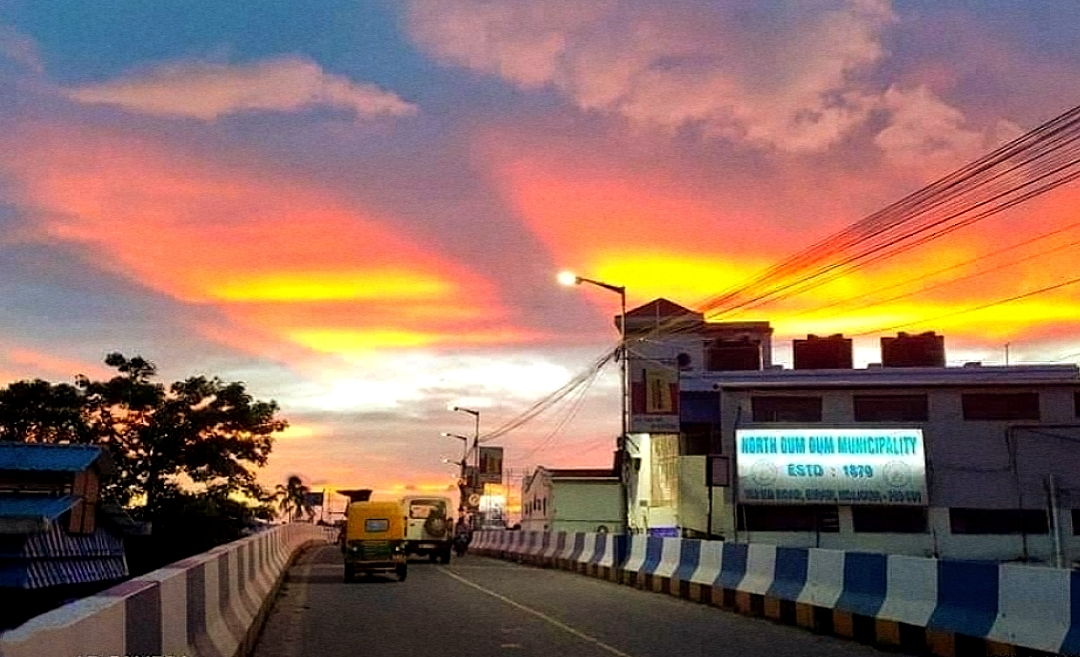
- Manik Bandhopadhyay Setu (Birati Flyover)

- Location in West Bengal, India Birati (West Bengal) Birati (India)
- Coordinates: 22.6643°N 88.4283°E
- Country: India
- State: West Bengal
- Division: Presidency
- District: North 24 Parganas
- Metro Station: Birati (under construction)
- Railway Station: Birati

Government
  - Type: Municipality
  - Body: North Dum Dum Municipality

Languages
  - Official: Bengali, English
- Time zone: UTC+5:30 (IST)
- PIN: 700051, 700081, 700134
- Telephone code: +91 33
- Vehicle registration: WB
- Lok Sabha constituency: Dum Dum
- Vidhan Sabha constituency: Dum Dum Uttar
- Climate: Tropical (Köppen)

Birati is a neighbourhood in North Dumdum of North 24 Parganas district in the state of West Bengal, India. It is a part of the area covered by Kolkata Metropolitan Development Authority (KMDA). The locality is adjacent to the Netaji Subhas Chandra Bose International Airport.

== History ==
=== Historical background and origin ===
Birati, formerly known as "Biroti", derives its name from the Bengali word, meaning "taking a break". The area has a rich historical legacy dating back to ancient times. The Nimta-Birati region was a prominent Janapada during the era of Laksmikanta Roy Choudhury. After his demise in 1649, Birati became the capital of Laksmikanta's jagir and served as the administrative headquarters until 1716, when the capital was relocated to Barisha.

Today, Birati still retains its historical significance as the ancestral home of the Sabarna Roy Choudhury family, one of the oldest zamindar families in Bengal. In ancient India, Birati used to be a part of Greater 24 parganas which were then under the Satgaon (ancient Saptagram, now in Hoogly district) administration during the Mughal era and later it was included in Hoogly chakla (district under post-Mughal Nawabi rule) during the rule of Murshid Quli Khan. In 1757, after the Battle of Plassey, Nawab Mir Jafar confer the Zamindari of 24 parganas and janglimahals (small administrative units) to the British East India Company. These were Amirpur, Akbarpur, Balia, Birati, Azimabad, Basandhari, Baridhati, Bagjola, Kalikata, Garh, Hatiagarh, Islampur, Dakshin Sagar, Kharijuri, Khaspur, Ikhtiarpur, Madhyamgram, Magura, Medanmalla, Maida, Manpur, Muragachha, Pechakuli, Paikan, Rajarhat, Shahpur, Shahnagar, Satal and Uttar Pargana. Since then, this entire territory is known as Twenty four Parganas.

=== British colonial rule ===
The Battle of Plassey in 1757 was a pivotal moment that marked the beginning of British colonial rule in India. It was fought between the forces of the British East India Company, led by Robert Clive, and the Nawab of Bengal, Siraj-ud-Daulah. Despite being vastly outnumbered, the British East India Company emerged victorious due to political intrigue and betrayal, rather than military prowess.

The aftermath of the Battle of Plassey saw significant changes in the political landscape of India. The British East India Company was granted the zamindari rights of the 24 Parganas, including Birati, by Nawab Mir Jafar. This marked the formal beginning of British colonial rule in the region, with the British East India Company assuming control over governance, administration, and economic activities.

Under British colonial rule, India underwent profound transformations and extreme exploitation. The British introduced a new administrative framework, replacing traditional governance structures with bureaucratic systems. They implemented economic policies that prioritized British interests, leading to the exploitation of India's resources and wealth. Socially, the British colonial rule brought about cultural changes, education reforms, and the introduction of English as the administrative and educational language.

== Geography ==
=== Police station ===
Nimta police station under Barrackpore Police Commissionerate has jurisdiction over North Dum Dum Municipal areas.

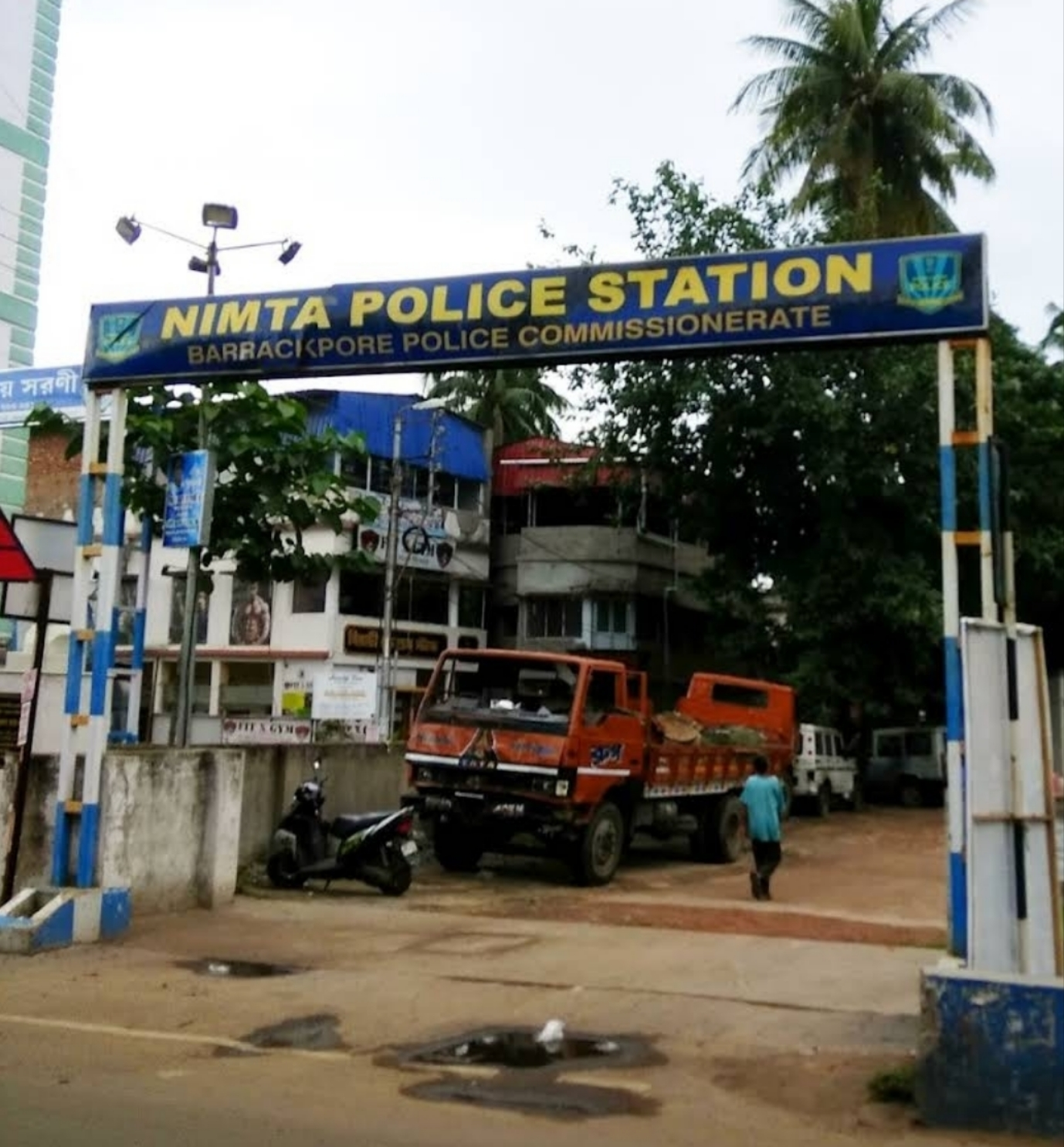
Nimta Police Station

Airport police station under Bidhannagar Police Commissionerate also has jurisdiction over North Dum Dum Municipal areas.

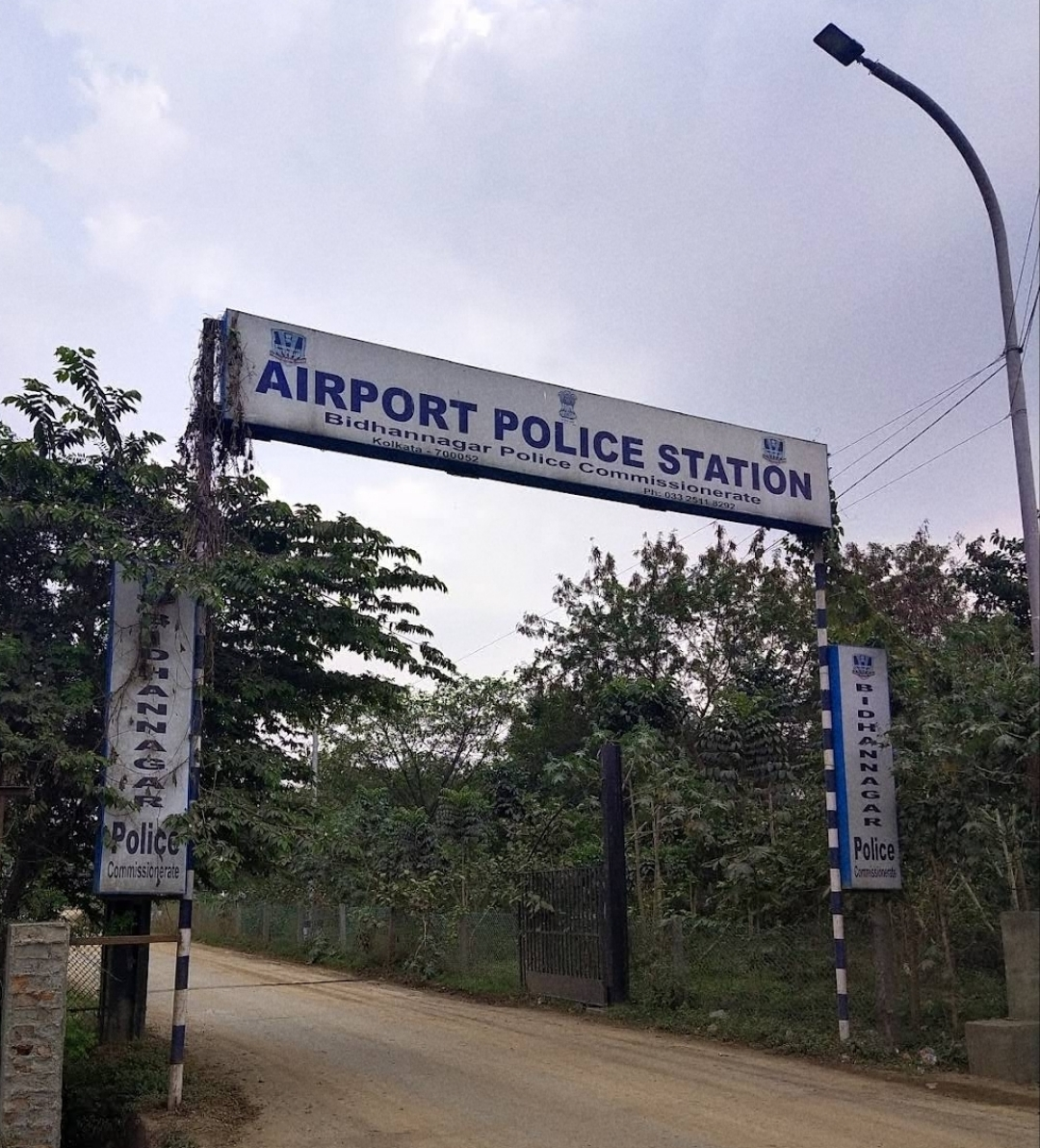
Airport Police Station

=== Post office ===
Birati has a delivery sub post office, with PIN 700051 in the North Presidency Division of North 24 Parganas district in Calcutta region. The only other post offices with the same PIN is Sultanpur.

Rajbari Colony has a delivery sub post office, with PIN 700081 in the Kolkata North Division of Kolkata district in Calcutta region.

Nilachal has a delivery sub post office, with PIN 700134 in the North Presidency Division of North 24 Parganas district in Calcutta region.

== Education ==
Notable colleges and schools in the Birati area include:

- Birati High School (H.S)
- Birati Mahajati Balika Vidyamandir (H.S)
- Birati Mahajati Vidyamandir (H.S)
- Birati Vidyalaya for Boys (H.S)
- Birati Vidyalaya for Girls (H.S)
- Mrinalini Dutta Mahavidyapith
- St. Stephen's School, Birati
- Uttar Dum Dum Vidyapith for Boys (H.S) and Uttar Dum Dum Vidyapith for Girls (H.S)

== Notable people ==
- Ratan Lal Basu, economist, fiction author in English, Indologist and specialist in Yoga and Tantra cult, born at Belakoba, Jalpaiguri district, now resides at Birati.
- Sabarna Roy Choudhury, a Zamindar family of Mughal Bengal.
- Sayak Chakraborty Bengali television actor, originally from Birati.
- Avijit Sen, filmmaker.

== Transport ==
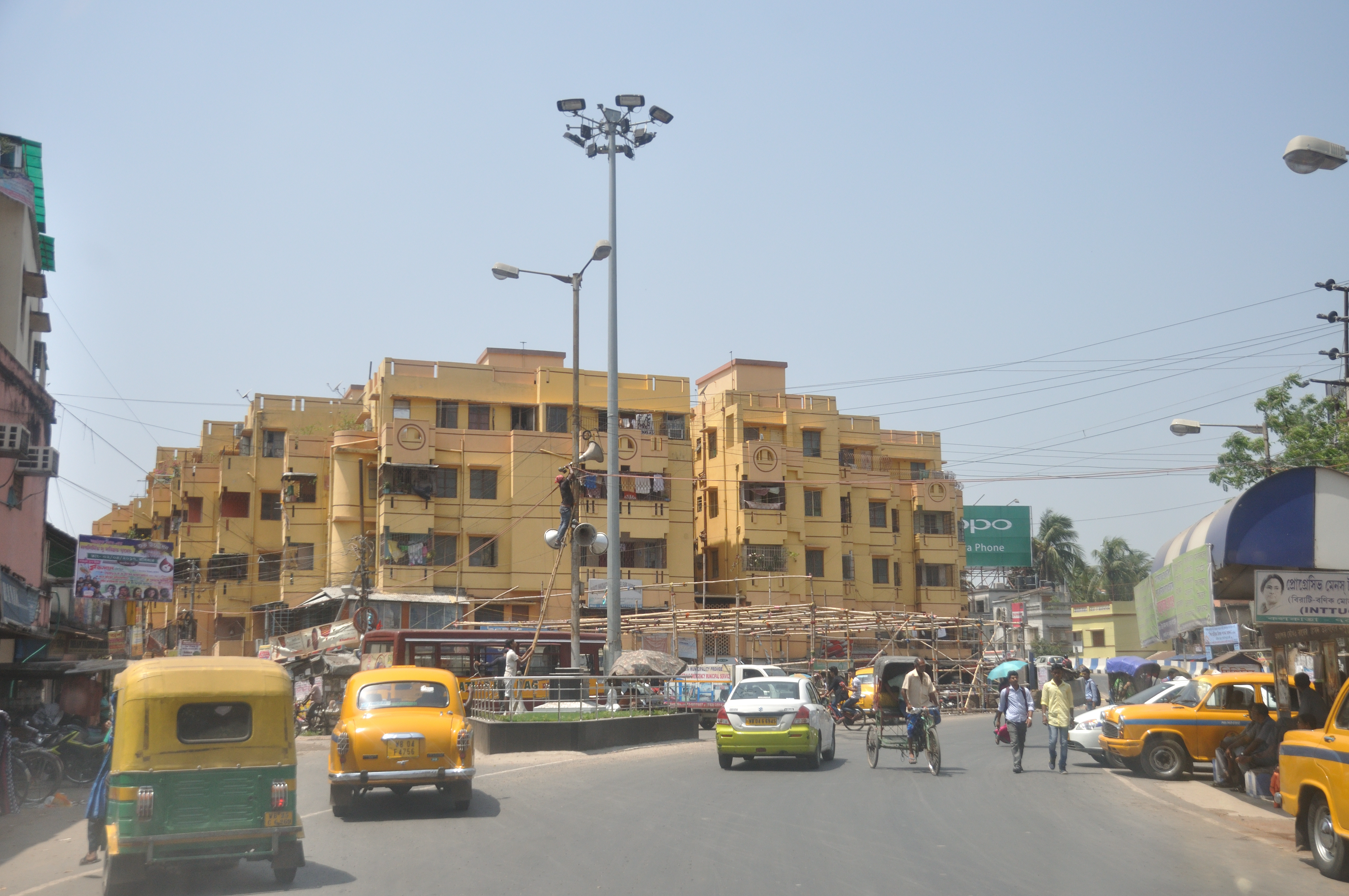
Banik More, Birati

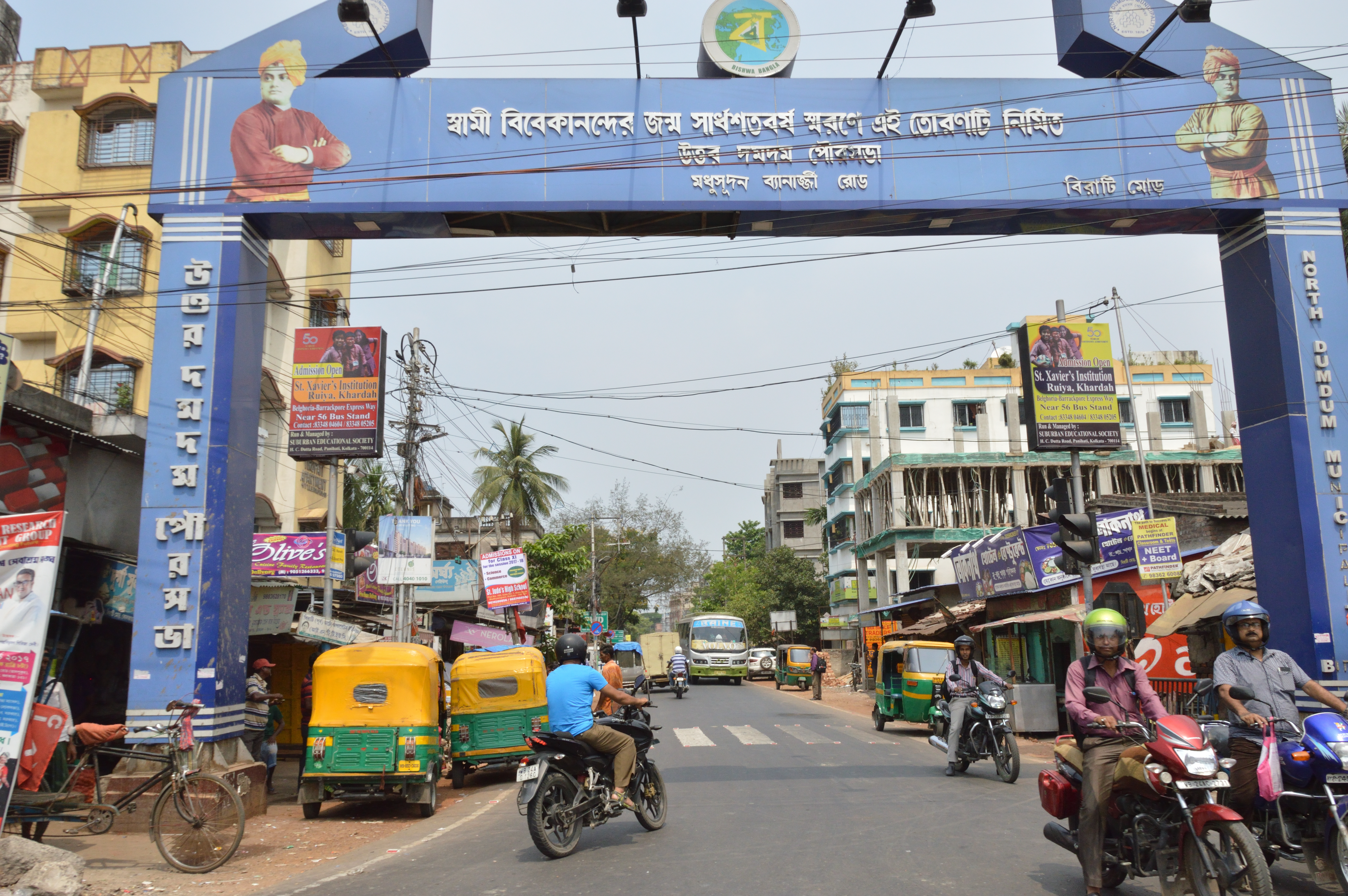
Birati More, Birati

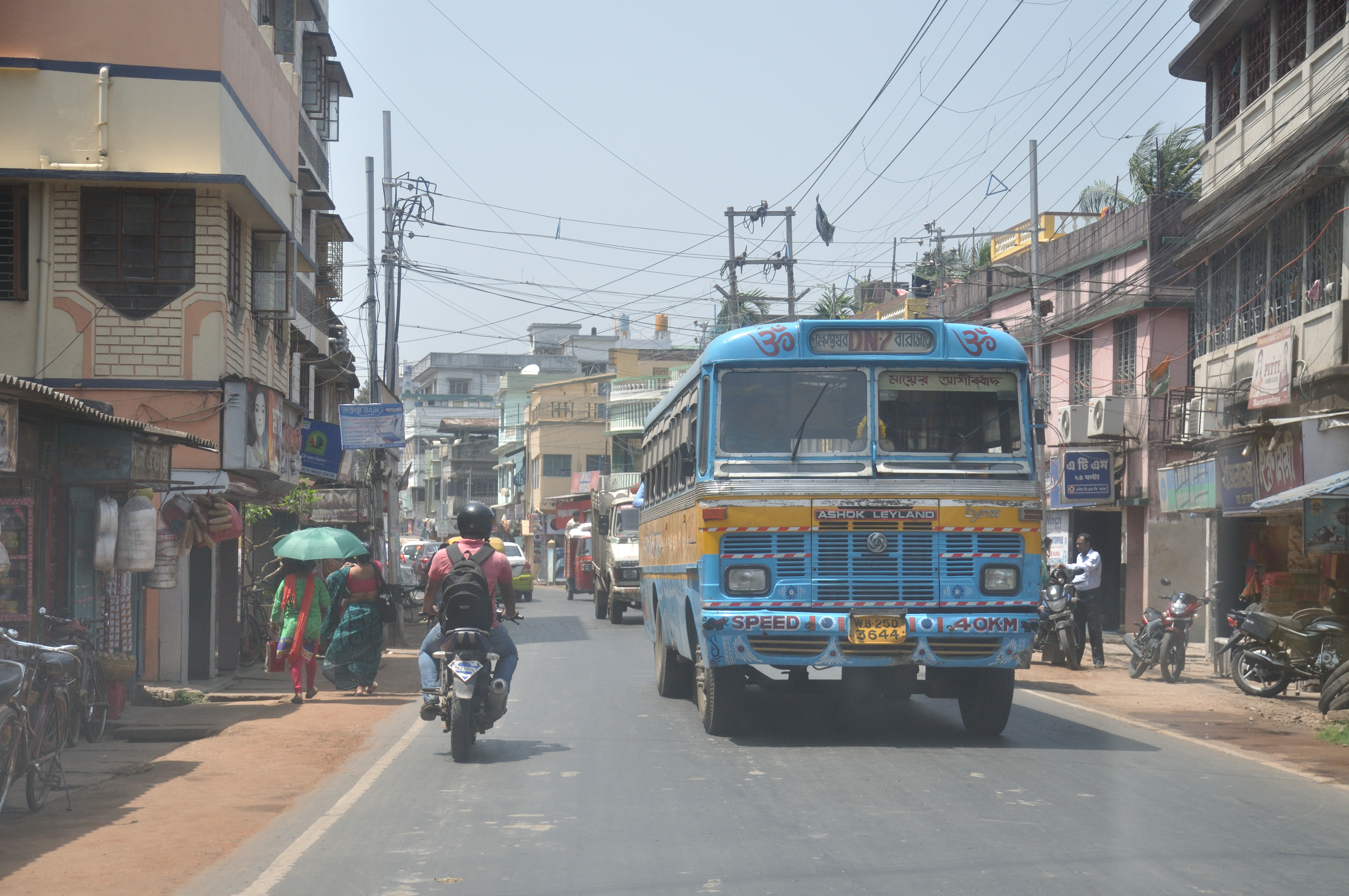
Madhusudan Banerjee Road (M.B. Road), Birati

=== Roadways ===
Madhusudhan Banerjee Road (M.B. Road) passes through Birati. Birati has the 237 Bus Stand and Birati Mini Bus stand which provide Babughat and B.B.D Bag, respectively as destination. Birati is surrounded by Jessore Road(NH 34) in the east, Kalyani Expressway in the west and Belghoria Expressway(NH 12) in the south, all of which are accessible through the M.B. Road.

=== Railways ===
Birati railway station on the Sealdah–Bangaon line serves the area. Birati will soon be connected with the Noapara-Barasat Line (Yellow Line) of Kolkata Metro. The metro station will be underneath Jessore Road at Birati More (the point where M.B. Road meets Jessore Road).

Airways

The Netaji Shubash Chandra Bose International Airport is located to the west of Birati, and they are adjacent. The airport is reachable through the Jessore Road, which surrounds Birati from the west.

== Markets ==
Markets in Birati areas are:

- Jodu Babur Bazar
- Siddheshwari Bazar
- Nilachal Anjangarh Bazaar
- Pathanpur Natun Bazar
- Majherhati Bazaar
