= Belghoria Expressway =

Road in Kolkata, India

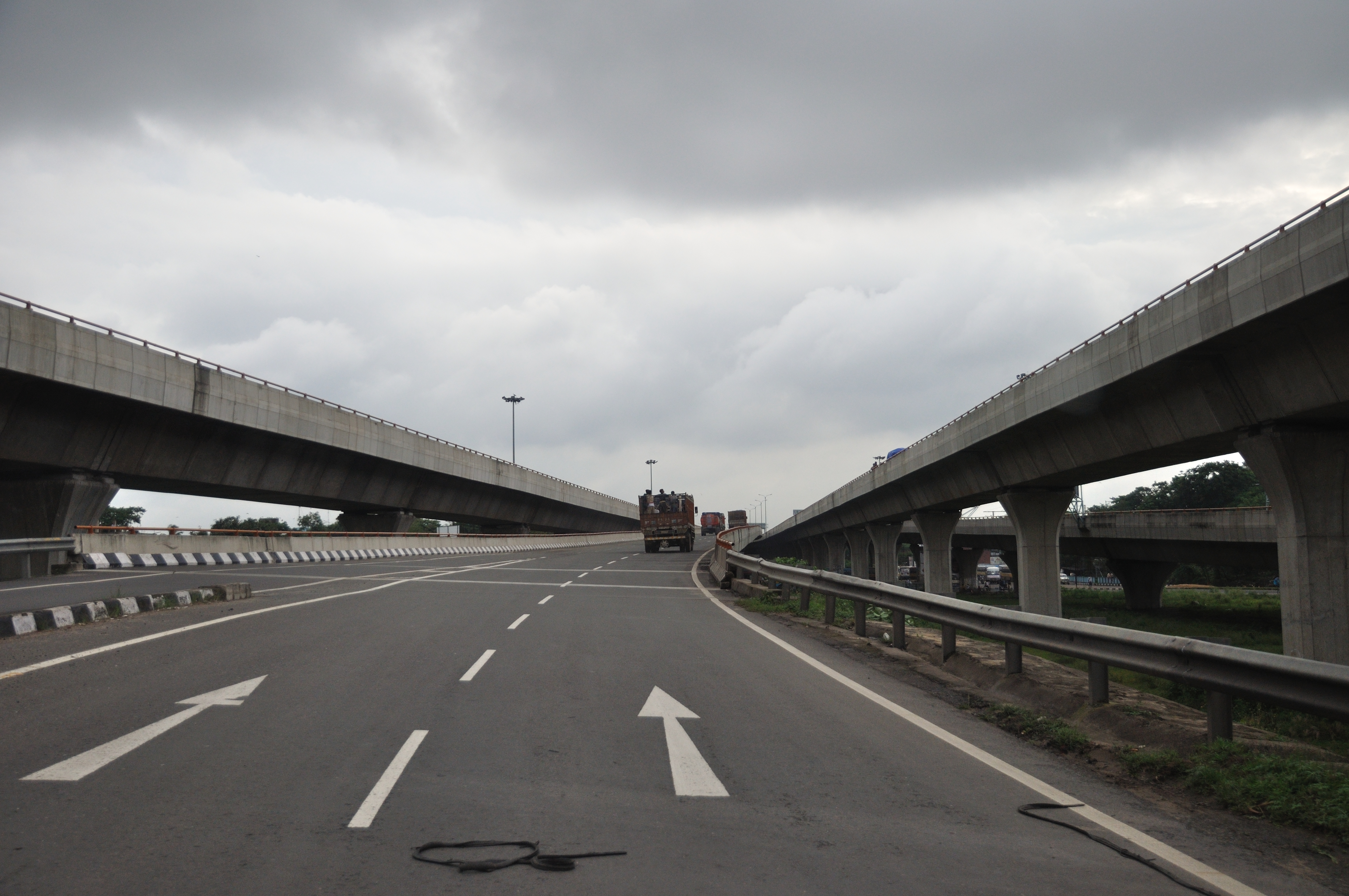
- Belghoria expressway at Dakshineswar in Baranagar
- Maintained by: NHAI
- Length: 16 km (9.9 mi)
- Location: Greater Kolkata (North 24 Parganas district and Howrah district), India
- Nearest Kolkata Metro station: Baranagar; Dakshineswar
- east end: Netaji Subhas Chandra Bose International Airport Gate no. 3
- west end: Dakshineswar, with an extension to Rajchandrapur near Dankuni

Construction
- Commissioned: 1967
- Completion: 2006
- Inauguration: 2008

Belghoria Expressway is a 16 kilometres (9.9 mi) long grade separated bypass expressway in the northern metropolitan region of Kolkata, West Bengal, which forms part of NH 12. It bypasses the core city area and links the terminal junction points of NH 16 and NH 19 at Rajchandrapur near Dankuni (extended east end) to Jessore Road near Dumdum/Kolkata Airport (west end).

== Route ==
Belgharia expressway runs through the northern metropolitan area of Kolkata bypassing the core city area. From west to east, starting from Jessore Road intersection near Dumdum/Kolkata Airport gate 3 (west end), it transverses through major places like Manikpur, Durganagar, Mathkal, Belgharia, Dunlop, Dakshineswar, passes the Hooghly River by Nivedita Setu and terminates at the Rajchandrapur intersection with NH 16 and NH 19.

The expressway is 4 laned from Kolkata Airport to Dakshineswar and the extended portion upto Rajchandrapur along with Nivedita Setu is 6 laned. There are no service lanes and main carriageway lanes can not be expanded which becomes an issue for National Highways Authority of India.

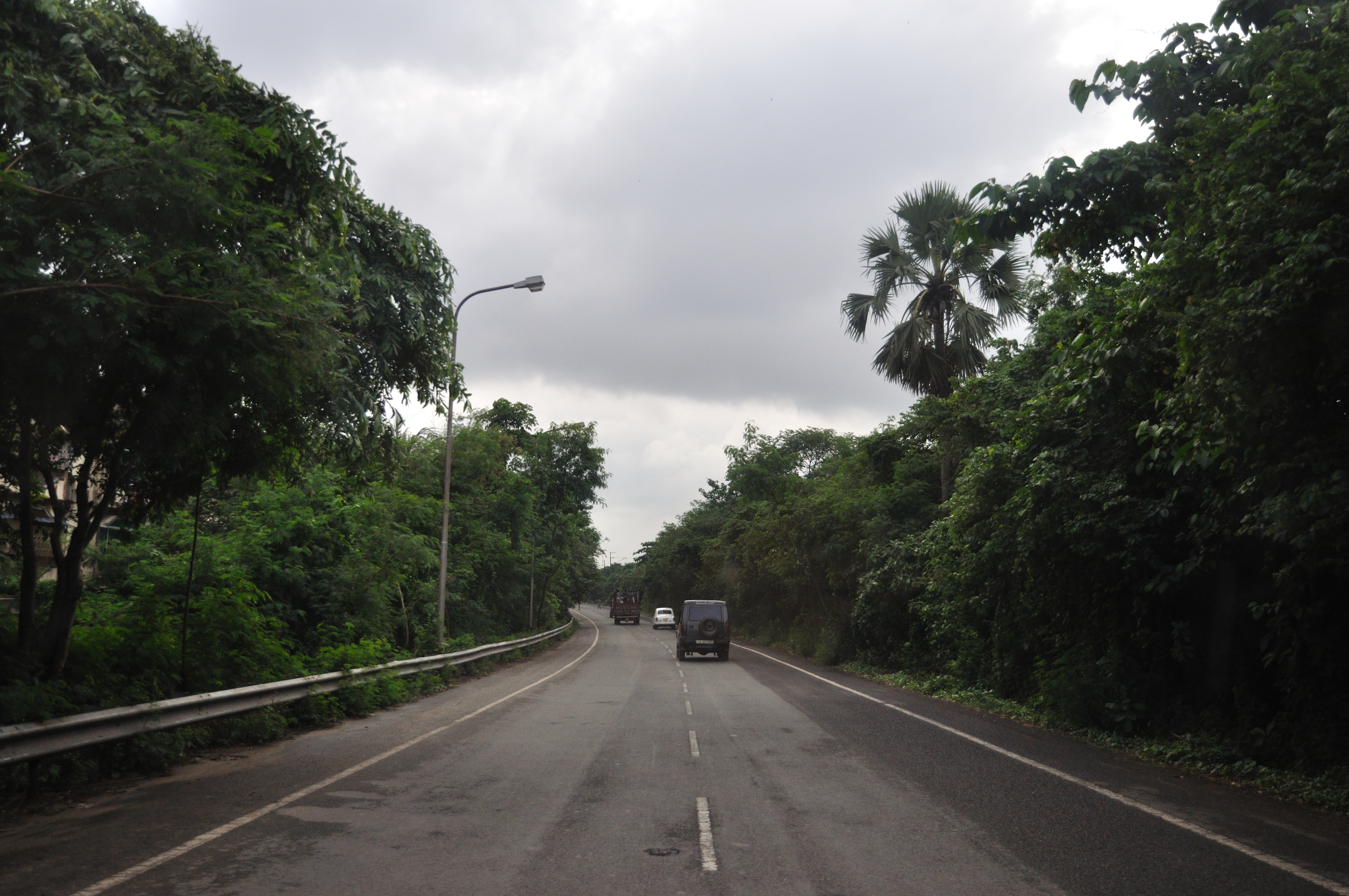
Belghoria Expressway in Baranagar

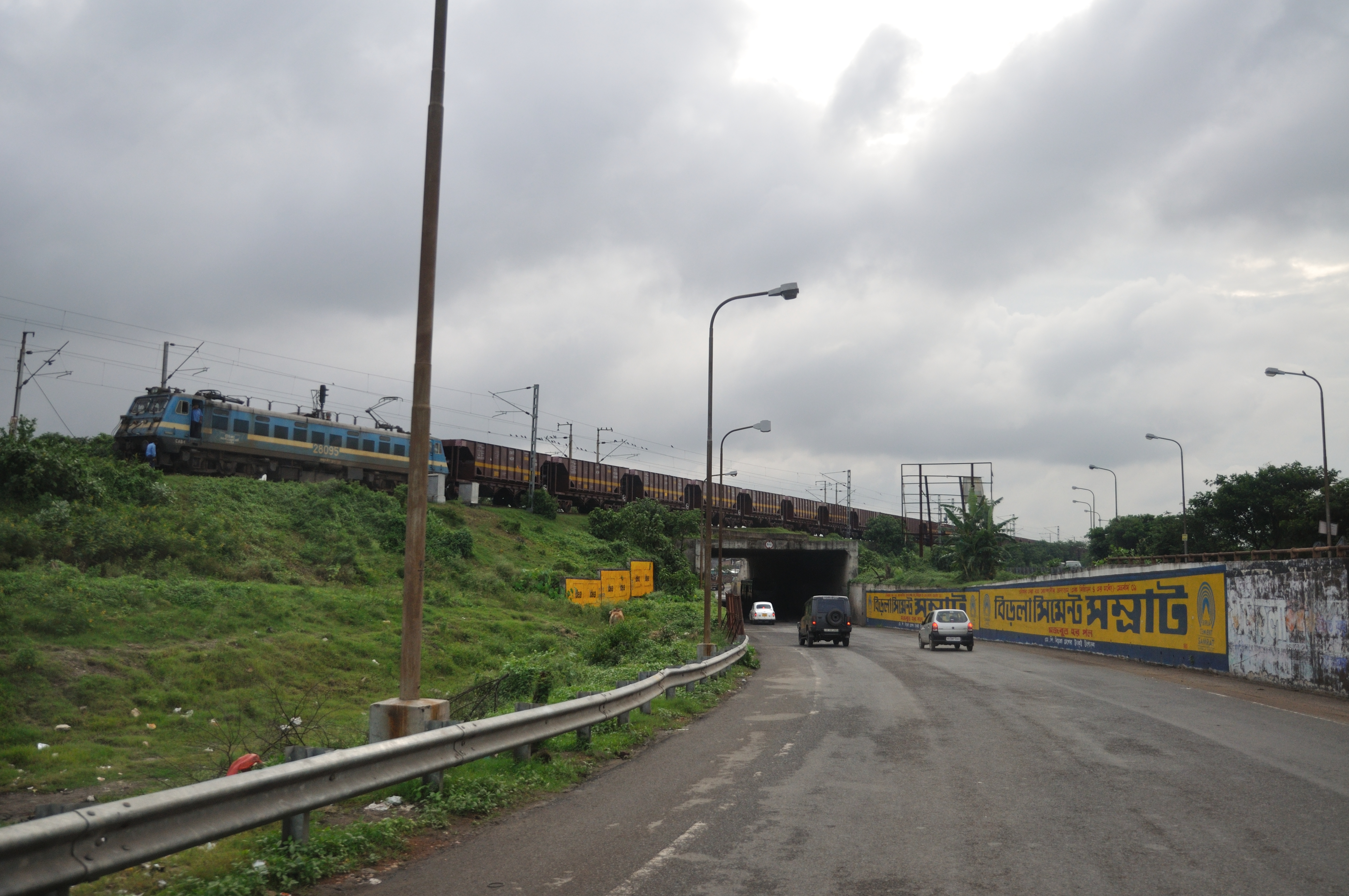
Belghoria Expressway underpass in Baranagar

Belgharia expressway do not have any intersections or traffic signals but have major interchanges with National Highways or other expressways.

List of interchanges
Location	Interchange with	Type
Dumdum near Dumdum/Kolkata Airport gate 3	Jessore Road	Y interchange
Nimta (under construction as of 2024)	Kalyani Expressway	Y interchange
Dakshineswar	Pwd approach road to BT Road	Modified stack interchange
Rajchandrapur	NH 16 and NH 19	
