= Belgharia =

- Neighbourhood
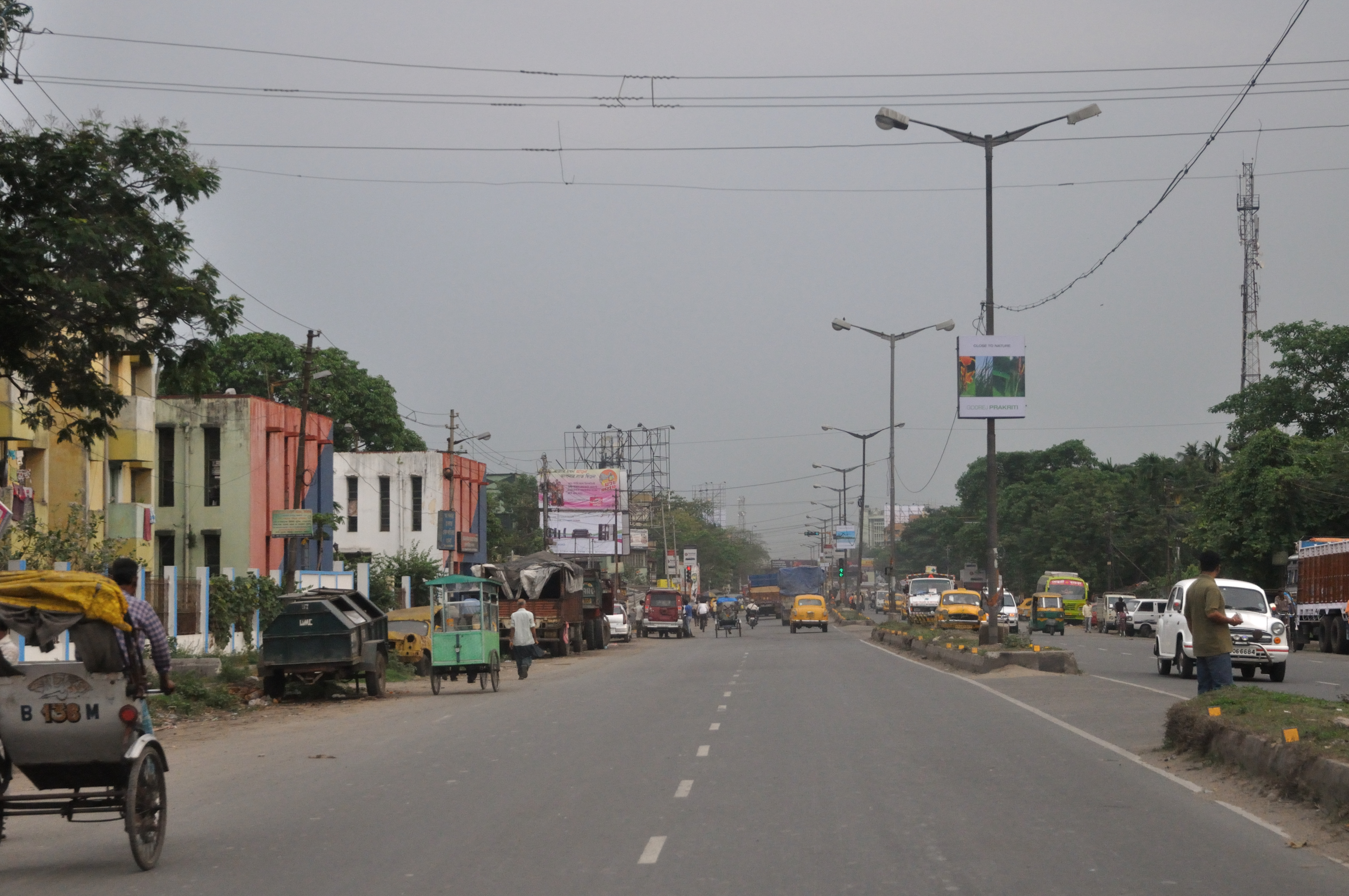
- B.T Road, Rathtala

- Location West Bengal, India Belgharia (West Bengal) Belgharia (India)
- Coordinates: 22.6636°N 88.3754°E
- Country: India
- State: West Bengal
- Division: Presidency
- District: North 24 Parganas
- Metro Station: Baranagar
- Railway Station: Belgharia

Government
  - Type: Municipality
  - Body: Kamarhati Municipality
  - Vice-Chairman: Tushar Chatterjee

Languages
  - Official: Bengali
  - Additional official: English
- Time zone: UTC+5:30 (IST)
- PIN: 700056, 700083
- Telephone code: +91 33
- Vehicle registration: WB
- Lok Sabha constituency: Dum Dum
- Vidhan Sabha constituency: Kamarhati, Baranagar

Belgharia is a neighbourhood in Kamarhati of North 24 Parganas district in the Indian state of West Bengal. It is a part of the area covered by Kolkata Metropolitan Development Authority (KMDA).

== Geography ==
Cities and towns in the southern portion of Barrackpore subdivision in North 24 Parganas district
M: municipal city/ town, CT: census town,
N: neighbourhood/ administrative location
Owing to space constraints in the small map, the actual locations in a larger map may vary slightly

=== Location ===
96% of the population of Barrackpore subdivision (partly presented in the map alongside, all places marked on the map are linked in the full screen map) lives in urban areas. In 2011, it had a density of population of 10,967 per km^{2}. The subdivision has 16 municipalities and 24 census towns.

For most of the cities/ towns information regarding density of population is available in the Infobox. Population data is not available for neighbourhoods. It is available for the entire Municipal area and thereafter ward-wise.

=== Police station ===
Belgharia police station under Barrackpore Police Commissionerate has jurisdiction over Kamarhati Municipal area.

== Economy ==
Belgharia has now become a business hub, well connected with Kolkata through trains, buses and other means of transport. The nearest Industrial area is Kamarhati (3 km), with the following companies: Agarpara Jute Mill, Allied Ceramic, ESDEE Allumina, Emami, Kamarhati Jute Mill, Texmaco Rail & Engineering, TIL, WIMCO.

== Transport ==
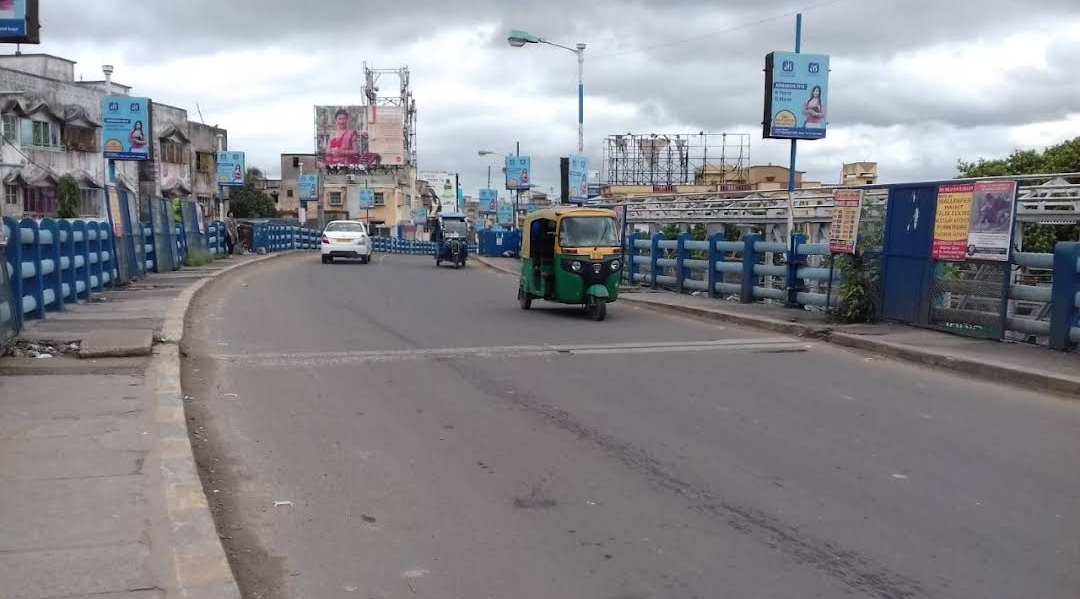
Kabi Satyendranath Dutta Setu

Feeder road is one of the main roads in Belgharia. Feeder road connects Belgharia to Barrackpore Trunk Road (B.T. Road) on the west and through Madhusudan Banerjee Road (M.B. Road) to Nimta, Birati and consequently to Jessore Road in the east. Feeder Road and Madhusudan Banerjee Road (M.B. Road) are connected with a rail over-bridge named Kabi Satyendranath Dutta Setu above Belgharia railway station. The nearest metro station is Baranagar metro station on the Kolkata Metro's Blue Line, located at an approximately 3.4 km distance from Belgharia railway station. The newly built Belghoria Expressway which links with Dumdum/Kolkata Airport on Jessore Road and Nivedita Setu on the Hooghly River increased the importance of this place.

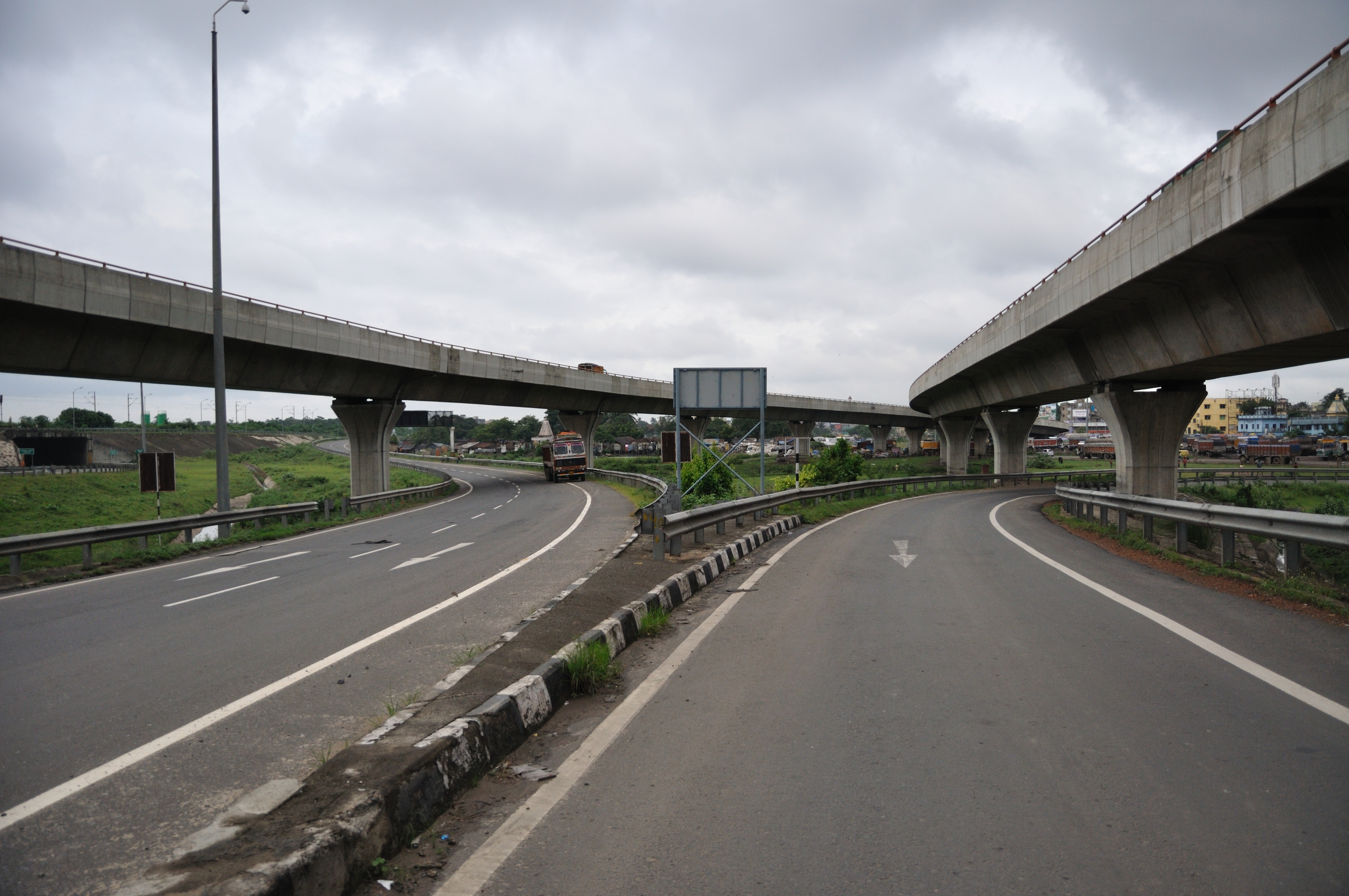
Belghoria Expressway near Nivedita Setu

=== Bus ===
==== WBTC Bus ====
- AC-54 Belgharia (Rathtala) - Howrah Station
- S-9A Dunlop - Ballygunge Stn.
- E-32 Nilgunj Depot - Howrah Station
- ACT-32 Barrackpore - Howrah Station
- S-11 Nilgunj Depot - Esplanade
- S-32 Barrackpore Court - Howrah Station
- AC20 Barrackpore Court - Santragachi Stn.
- AC-54B Barrackpore - Howrah Station

==== Private Bus ====
- 56 Ruiya Purbapara - Howrah Station
- 78 Barrackpore Court - Esplanade
- 78/1 Rahara Bazar/Parthapur - Babughat
- 81/1 Rajchandrapur - Barasat
- 201 Nimta Post Office- Salt Lake Sector-V
- 214 Sajirhat - Babughat
- 214A Sodepur Girja - Esplanade
- 230 Kamarhati - Alipore Zoo
- 234 Belgharia Post office - Golf Green
- 234/1 Belgharia railway station - Golf Green
- DN2 Dakshineswar - Barasat
- DN43 Dakshineswar - Barasat Checkpost

==== Mini Bus ====
- S180 Nandannagar - Howrah Maidan
- S185 Nimta Paikpara - Howrah Station

==== Bus Routes Without Numbers ====
- Madhyamgram - Howrah station
- Barrackpore - Howrah station etc.

=== Train ===
Belgharia railway station is one of the stations on the main train line (Sealdah-Ranaghat line) starting from Sealdah Station. It situates between Dum Dum and Agarpara railway stations on the main section.

=== Metro Rail ===
The Baranagar metro station on the Blue Line (North—South line), which is also planned to be the terminus of Pink Line, is close to Belgharia. Baranagar metro station near Dunlop More is located around 3.4 km away from Belgharia railway station. There are public buses and auto-rickshaw services from Belgharia to Dunlop More. Kamarhati is also a planned metro station on the Pink Line, near to Belgharia.

== Education ==
Bhairab Ganguly College was established at Belgharia in 1968. It was built by Sri Jibandhan Ganguli (Grandson of Sri Bhairab Ganguli), who contributed the land of 8.13 acres for the construction of a higher education institution. It offers honours courses in Bengali, English, Sanskrit, Hindi, Urdu, History, Philosophy, Political Science, Geography, Education, Physical Education, Physics, Chemistry, Mathematics, Botany, Zoology, Physiology, Economics, Electronics, Computer Science, Accountancy and general BA, BSc and B Com courses.

Ramakrishna Mission Shilpapitha is also situated in Belgharia. This is one of the oldest diploma engineering colleges in West Bengal established in 1951. It offers diploma in engineering in civil, electrical, mechanical and electronics and communications engineering courses.

RICE Head Office is situated here, a vital organization with a number of universities, schools and centres of education. One of the primary establishments of RICE Education, Adamas International School is also located in its proximity.
