= Barrackpore Government High School =

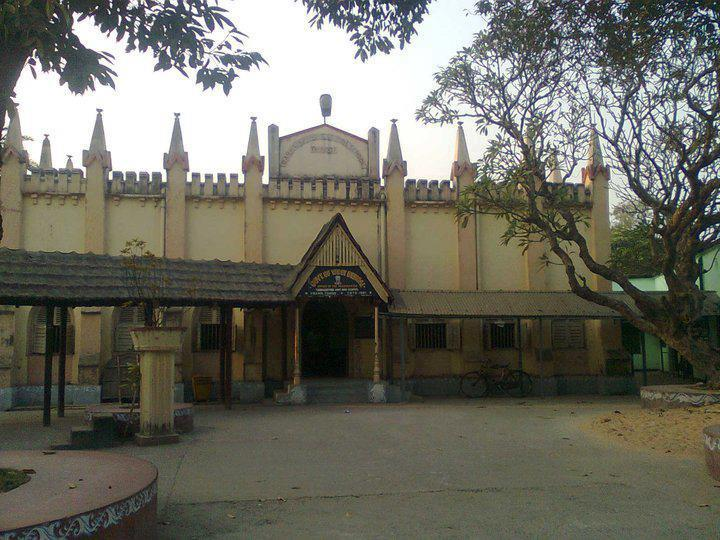
- Central structure of school

Location
- B T Road, Talpukur; Barackpore, North 24 Parganas; West Bengal, Kolkata; India
- Coordinates: 22°45′02.87″N 88°22′05.18″E

Information
- School type: Higher secondary
- Established: 1837; 189 years ago
- Founder: George Eden, 1st Earl of Auckland
- Assistant Teacher - in - Charge: Anindya Sengupta
- Grades: 1 to 12
- Gender: Boys school
- Language: Bengali (I-XII) & English (XI-XII)
- Colors: White and Navy blue
- Affiliation: West Bengal Board of Secondary Education/West Bengal Council of Higher Secondary Education

Barrackpore Government High School is situated on Barrackpore Trunk Road near Talpukur in Barrackpore, India and was established in 1837. Until recently it was believed that the school was established by Emily Eden. However, research gives credit to her elder brother George Eden, 1st Earl of Auckland the then Governor-General of India. He opened and ran the school at his own expense. The school continues to run from the heritage central building which is highly reminiscent of Collegiate Neo-Gothic architecture typical to nineteenth century British constructions.

The school has been referred as Eden School, Vice-regal School, Viceroy's Park School, Governor's School, Barrackpore Government Park School in government archives, newspapers and journals. It is now referred as Barrackpore Government School or Barrackpore Government High School.

== The beginning ==
The school was set up to teach English language to the impoverished children of the local Bengali neighborhoods. The school started with a handful of local boys. The earl was so enthusiastic that he used to distribute pens, books, papers for free amongst the enrolled pupils. He arranged a stipend for the advanced students who are able to teach the beginners so that economically backward families would be encouraged to send their children to the school. Caste discrimination had no place in Lord Auckland's school where all the boys had to study together irrespective of their caste and creed — which was exceptional considering the time.

Lord Auckland hired teachers from Calcutta and across Bengal at his own expense to give education of the finest quality. Among them, Rashik Lal Sen was also the first head master. The school started at the southeast corner of the erstwhile Barrackpore Park (now famous as Latbagan).

His sister Emily Eden was enthusiastic about her brother's school. She writes

'George’s new school has been open this last fortnight and some of the little native boys already read a fable in one syllable. It is astonishing how quick they are when they choose to learn.’ –Letter dated 26 March 1837, Barrackpore

Ex-students of the school have researched the subject and it seems that the school was set up on 2 January 1837.

== Time after Lord Auckland ==
The school continued to enjoy the vice-regal patronage until the end of colonial time. After the end of Lord Auckland's tenure successive governor generals maintained the school. Among them Lady and Lord Canning were very enthusiastic. Charlotte, Countess Canning gave favourable comments when she visited. After her sudden death, Lord Canning gave a donation from his purse for the expansion of the school building probably in memory of his wife.

The school had a tradition where the high performing students of each class collected their prizes from the governor in an annual ceremony organized inside the campus of Governor's House under a large banyan tree. All the students accompanied by the student cubs and scouts used to march from the school to the Governor's House along the road by the side of river Ganges. Usually the ceremonies were started with a short cultural programme organized by the pupils and was followed by the governor's short motivational speech. Even today a few old students can recollect when they received their prizes from Lord Casey, Lord Brabourne, Sir John Herbert, etc. The tradition continued until the end of the colonial era.

== The heritage buildings and the school campus ==
The oldest structure of the school is the centrally located Neo-Gothic architecture. The main architecture of the structure is almost unchanged with the exceptions of minor changes of design on top of the pinnacles. The building is still in use as the head master's offices.

The building that spans the left flank of the school is old architecture. The right flank that spans along the BT Road is relatively new. The northwest side building is also new and is the Science building and all the laboratories are there. The building just beside that is old. It was probably first used as a student hostel.

The recent addition of the school is the multi-story building on the north-west corner of the campus.

== Curriculum ==
The school has classes 1 to 12. Students appear for standard 10 (Madhyamik) examination under the West Bengal Board of Secondary Education and standard 12 (Higher Secondary Examination) examination under the West Bengal Council of Higher Secondary Education. Class 11 and 12 have three streams: science, arts and commerce. The language of instruction is primarily Bengali. For class 11–12, there is a separate section where language of instruction is English. Today English is taught as the lingua franca and the native vernacular Bengali is primarily preferred as the language of instruction in line with the governmental policies.

== Notable alumni ==
- Kshirode Prasad Vidyavinode – playwright of the late nineteenth century and professor of chemistry at General Assembly's Institution, Kolkata (later known as Scottish Church College)
- Pradip Ghosh – recitation artist
- Ritwick Chakraborty - Bengali film and stage actor
