= Central Research Institute for Jute and Allied Fibers =

Indian research institute

ICAR-Central Research Institute for Jute and Allied Fibers
- logo of ICAR-CRIJAF
- Type: Research Institute on Agriculture in India
- Established: 1953; 73 years ago
- Affiliations: Indian Council of Agricultural Research, New Delhi
- Director: Dr. Gouranga Kar
- Location: Barrackpore, North 24 Parganas, West Bengal, India; 22.45°N 88.26°E
- Campus: Urban Nilganj, Barrackpore
- Website: Official website

ICAR-Central Research Institute for Jute and Allied Fibers (ICAR-CRIJAF), established in 1953 as Jute Agricultural Research Institute (JARI), is a research institute on jute and allied fibres in India . It is a constituent unit of the Indian Council of Agricultural Research (ICAR), an autonomous body under Department of Agricultural Research & Education (DARE) under the Ministry of Agriculture and Farmers Welfare, Government of India. This institute is located in Barrackpore, North 24 Parganas, West Bengal, India.

== See also ==
- Central Sericultural Research and Training Institute
