= Barrackpore =

City in West Bengal, India

Barrackpore Barrackpur
- City
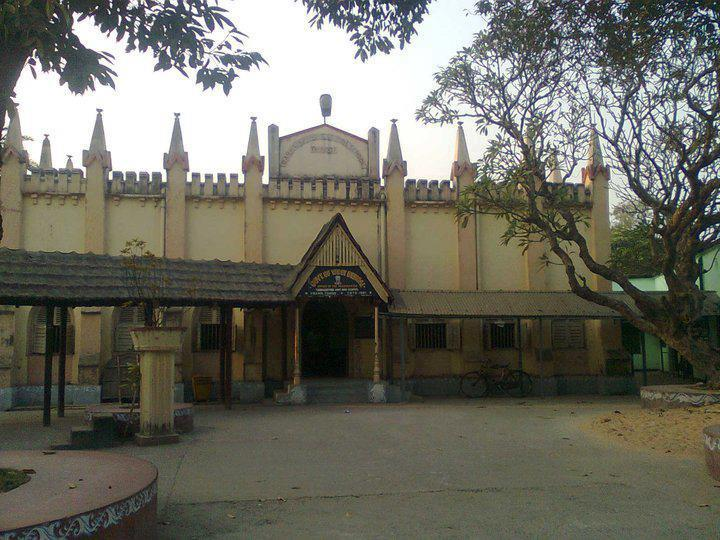
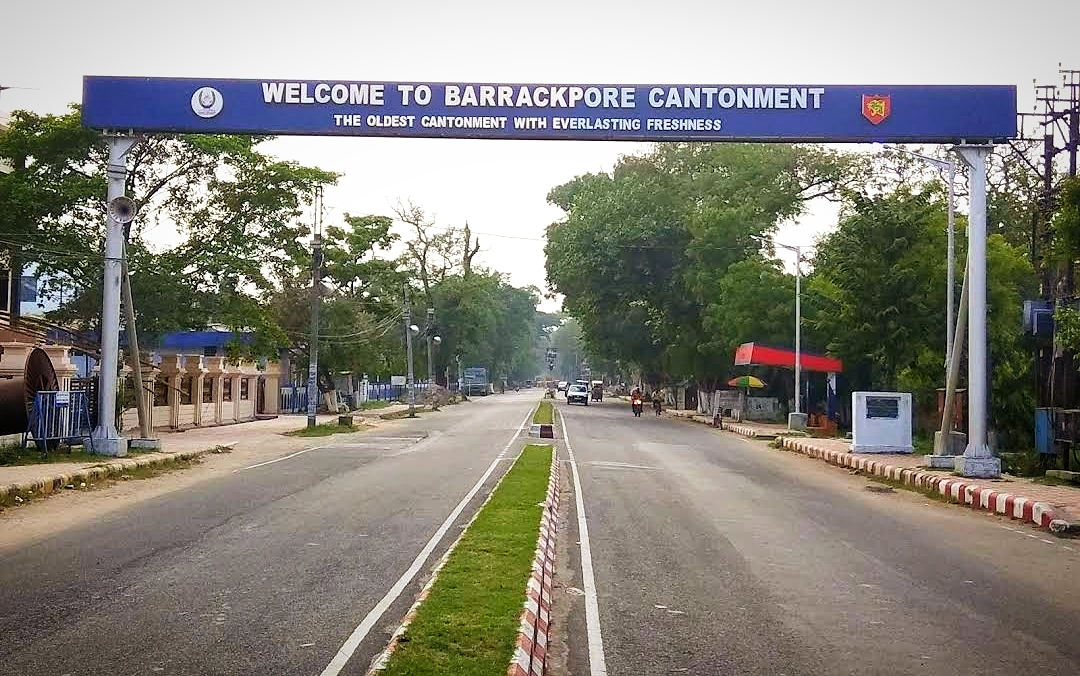
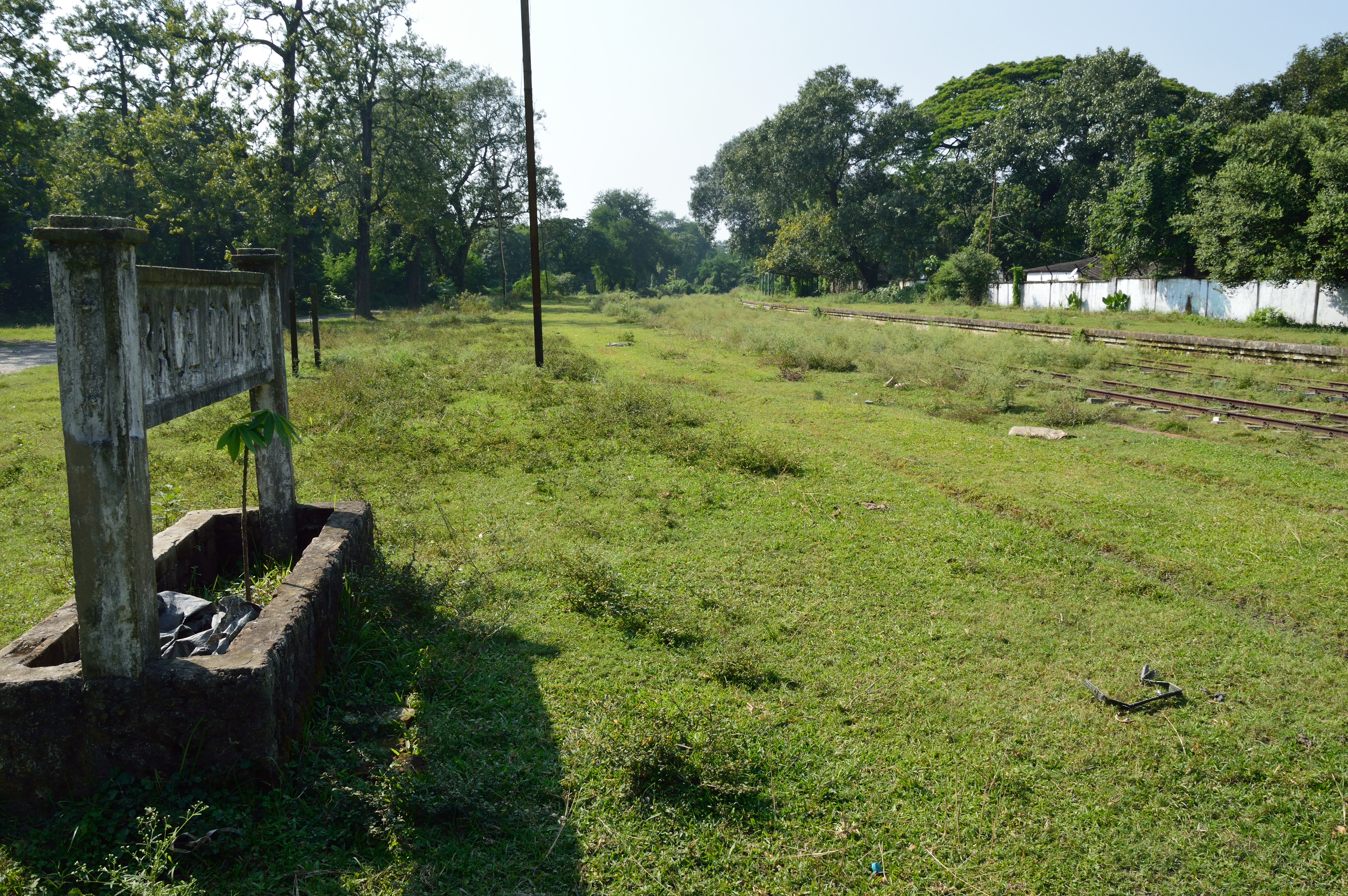
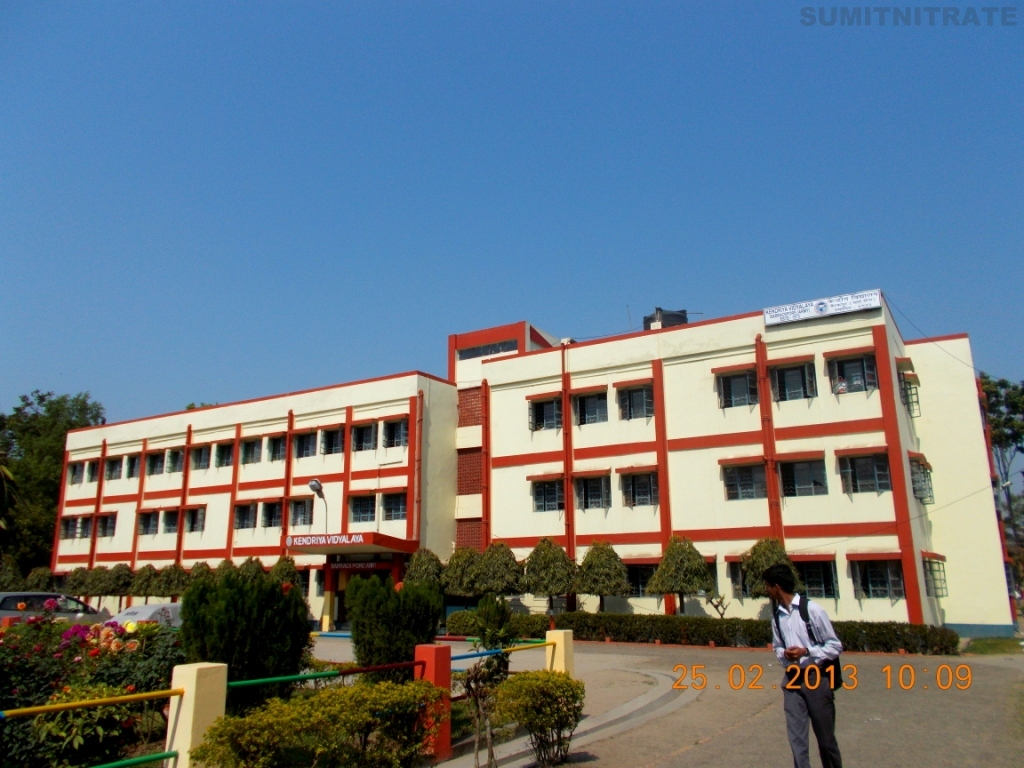
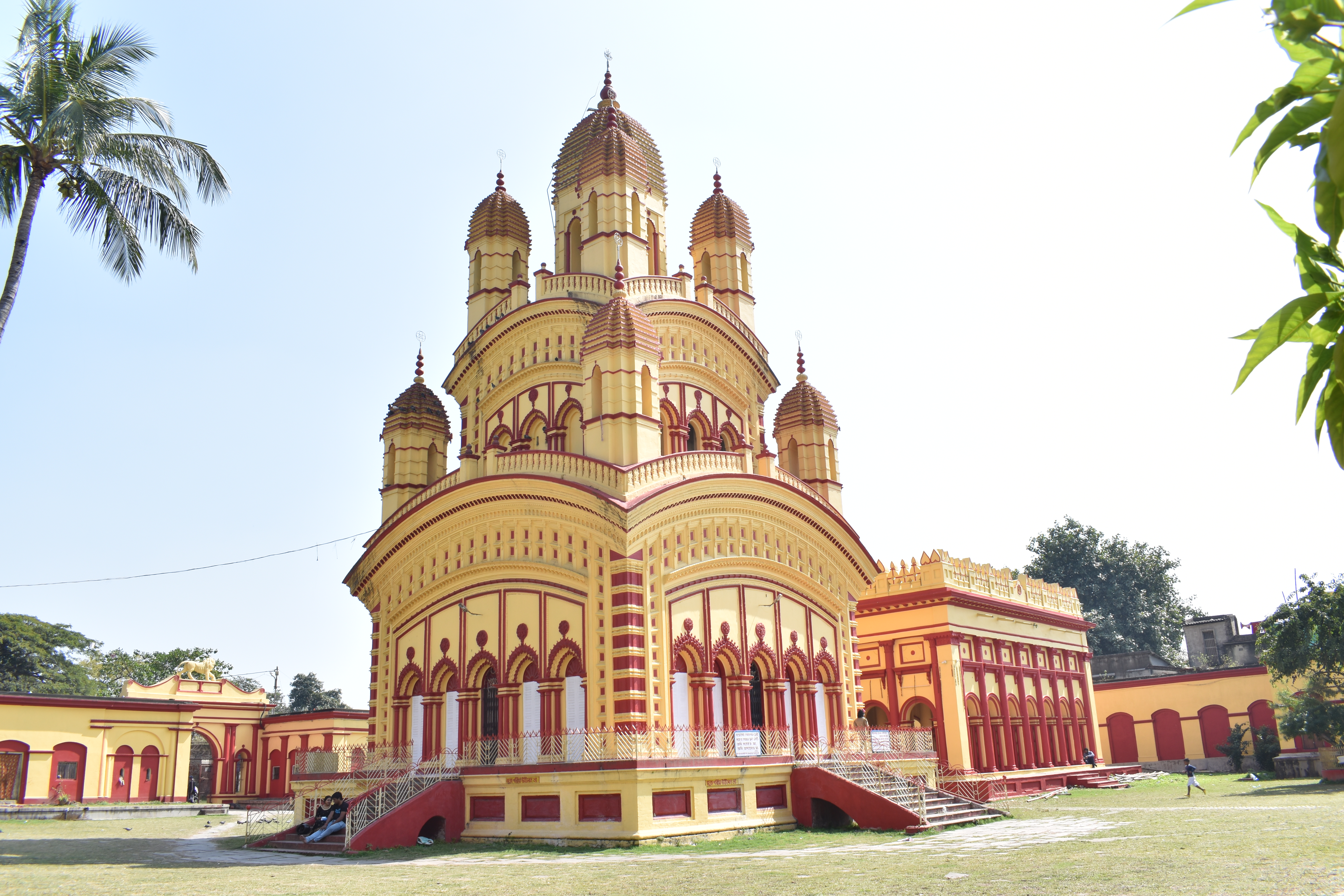
- Barrackpore railway station BT Road Barrackpore Government High School Entry gate towards Barrackpore Cantonment Government House in Barrackpore Racecourse track Kendriya Vidyalaya Army School in Barrackpore Annapurna Temple Gandhi Ghat, Barrackpore

- Location in West Bengal, India Barrackpore (India) Barrackpore (Asia)
- Coordinates: 22.76°N 88.37°E
- Country: India
- State: West Bengal
- Division: Presidency
- District: North 24 Parganas

Government
  - Type: Municipality
  - Body: Barrackpore Municipality
  - Chairman: Vacant
  - MLA: Koustav Bagchi (BJP)
  - MP: Partha Bhowmick (NCPI)

Area
  - Total: 10.61 km^{2} (4.10 sq mi)
- Elevation: 15 m (49 ft)

Population (2011)
  - Total: 152,784
  - Density: 14,400/km^{2} (37,300/sq mi)
- Demonym: Barrakpurians

Languages
  - Official: Bengali
  - Additional official: Hindi, English
- Time zone: UTC+5:30 (IST)
- PIN: 700120, 700121, 700122, 700123
- Telephone code: +91 33
- Vehicle registration: WB-23/WB-24
- Lok Sabha constituency: Barrackpore
- Vidhan Sabha constituency: Barrackpore
- Police Jurisdiction: Barrackpore Police Commissionerate
- Website: bkpmuty.in

Barrackpore, also spelled as Barrackpur, is a city and a municipality in North 24 Parganas district in the Indian state of West Bengal. It is the headquarters of the Barrackpore subdivision. The city is a part of the area covered by Kolkata Metropolitan Development Authority (KMDA).

== Etymology ==
The name Barrackpore may have originated from the English word "barracks", as it was the site of the first cantonment of the British East India Company. Alternatively, the Ain-i-Akbari suggests that the name comes from "Barbakpur". Manasa Vijay, written by Bipradas Pipilai, refers to Talpukur (a place in Barrackpore) as "Charnak".

== History ==
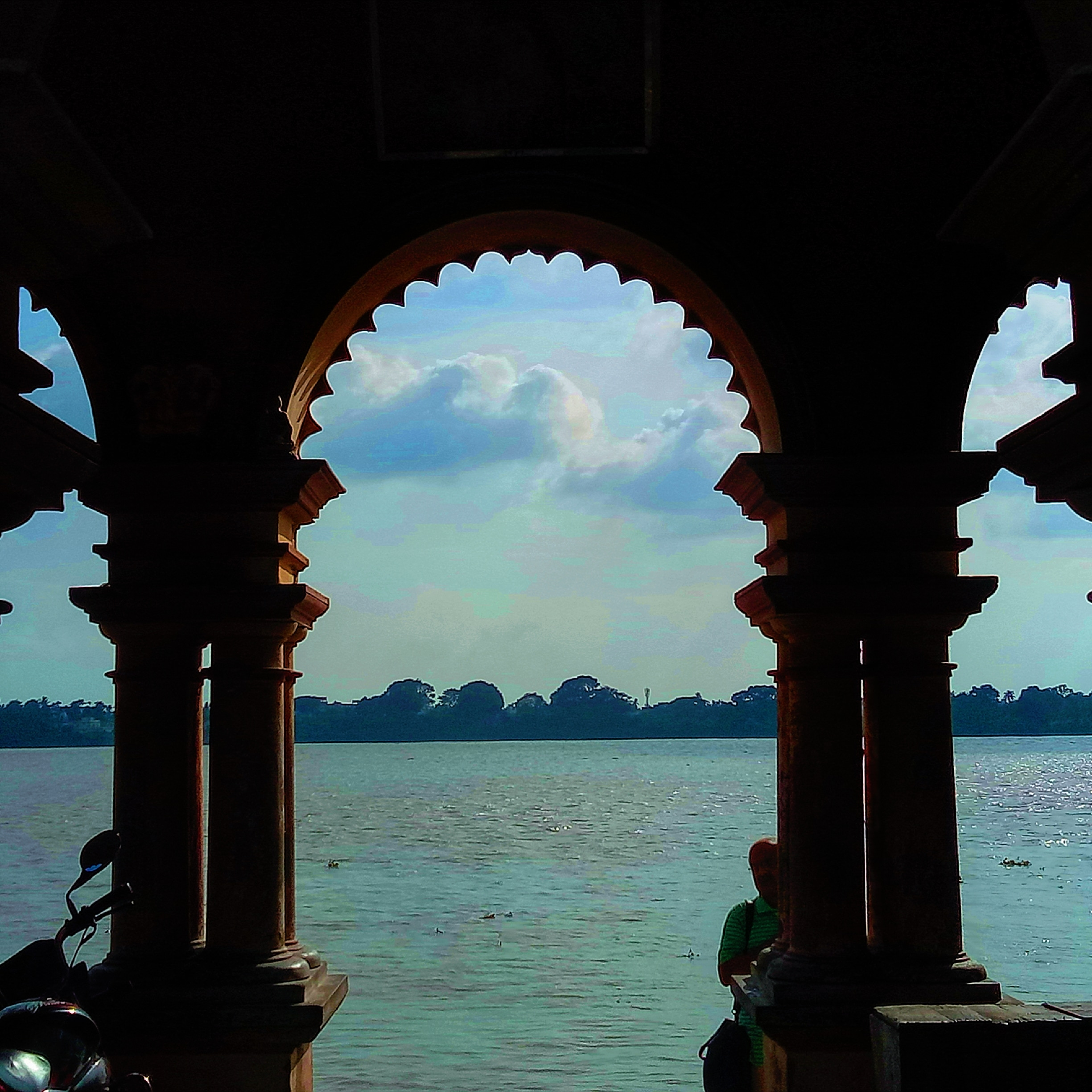
Ganga Ghat, Barrackpore

The earliest references to the Barrackpore region are found in the writings of the Greek navigators, geographers, chronicles and historians of the 1st century BC to the 3rd century AD. These authors generally referred to the country of a people variously called the Gangaridai (also Gangaridae or Gandaritai). By the 15th and 16th centuries, Chanak and the other towns in the region had become populous river towns. The Statistical Account of Bengal by W.W.Hunter mentions the towns and villages of this subdivision on the banks of the Hooghly river as chief trading and marketing centres: "On The Hugli- Calcutta, the chief seat of commerce in India. Baranagar, Dakhineswar, Agarpara, Panihati, Sukchar- Khardah, Barrackpur, Nawabganj, Ichapore, Shyam Nagar, Naihati and Halisahar contain large bazaars for sale of miscellaneous goods."

Under the Mughal Empire, Bengal was divided into Circars, or administrative subunits, each of which was ruled over by a Mahal. The name "Barbuckpur", another name for Barrackpore, is associated with a Mahal in the Ain-e-Akbari. From the 17th century, the area was ruled over by a line of Zamindars based in Nona Chandanpukur, Barrackpore.

The first British barrack or cantonment in India was built in the town in 1772. After the British crown assumed direct control of India, the sprawling Government House and the Government Estate were built in Barrackpore to provide the viceroy with a suburban residence 20 kilometres (12 miles) outside of Calcutta.

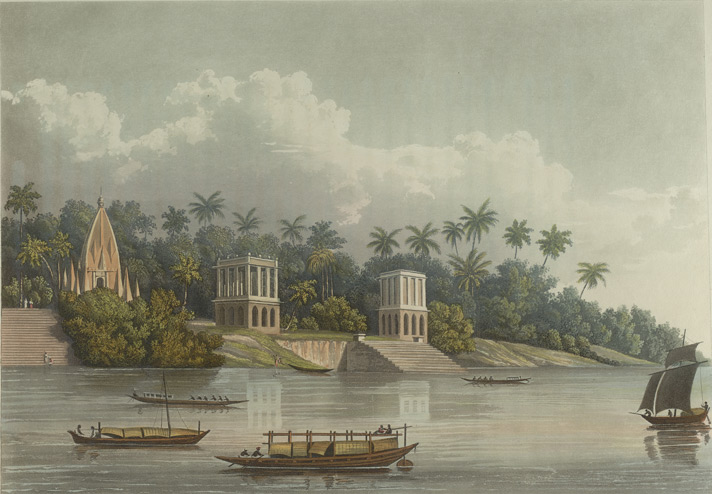
Hindoo Pagodas near Barrackpore on the Ganges (December, 1807)

Two rebellions against British authority took place in Barrackpore in the 19th century. The first of these was Barrackpore Mutiny of 1824, led by Sepoy Bindee Tiwary. In this rebellion, 47th Bengal Native Infantry refused to board boats to cross the sea for various reasons including social taboo "kala pani" to Burma in the First Anglo-Burmese War. The mutiny was suppressed by loyal Indian sepoys under the command of their British officers. In 1857, Barrackpore was the scene of an incident that some credit with starting the Indian Rebellion of 1857: an Indian soldier, Mangal Pandey, attacked his British commander, and was subsequently court-martialed. His regiment was disbanded, an action which offended a number of sepoys and is considered to have contributed to the anger that fuelled the rebellion. In order to commemorate his actions, a park named 'Sahid Mangal Pandey Udyan' was opened in the serenity of river Hoogly. The Army cantonment of Barrackpore also houses another significant historical landscape called the RCTC area, now populated by the defence quarters.

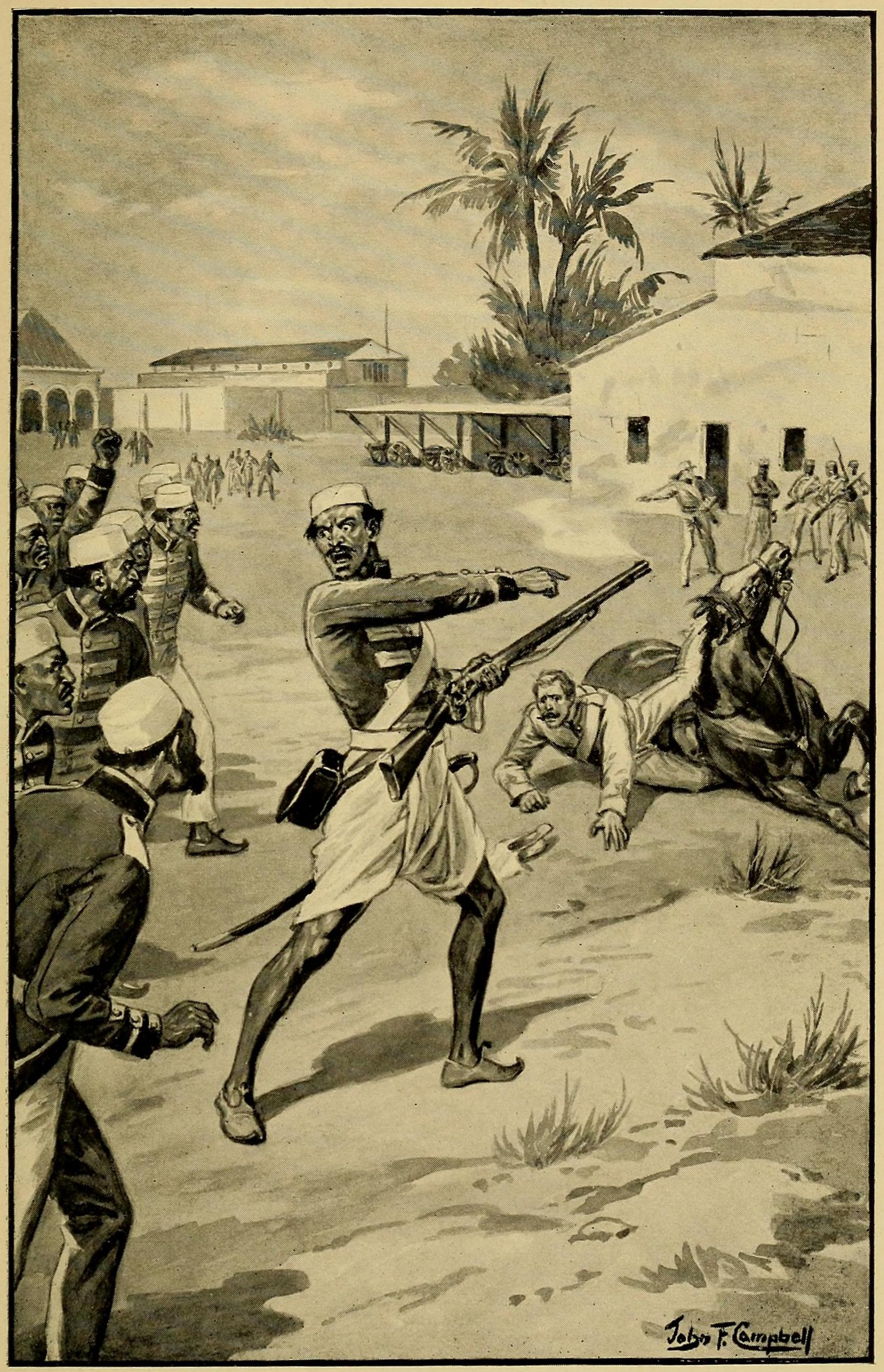
Mangal Pandey igniting the sepoy mutiny (1857)

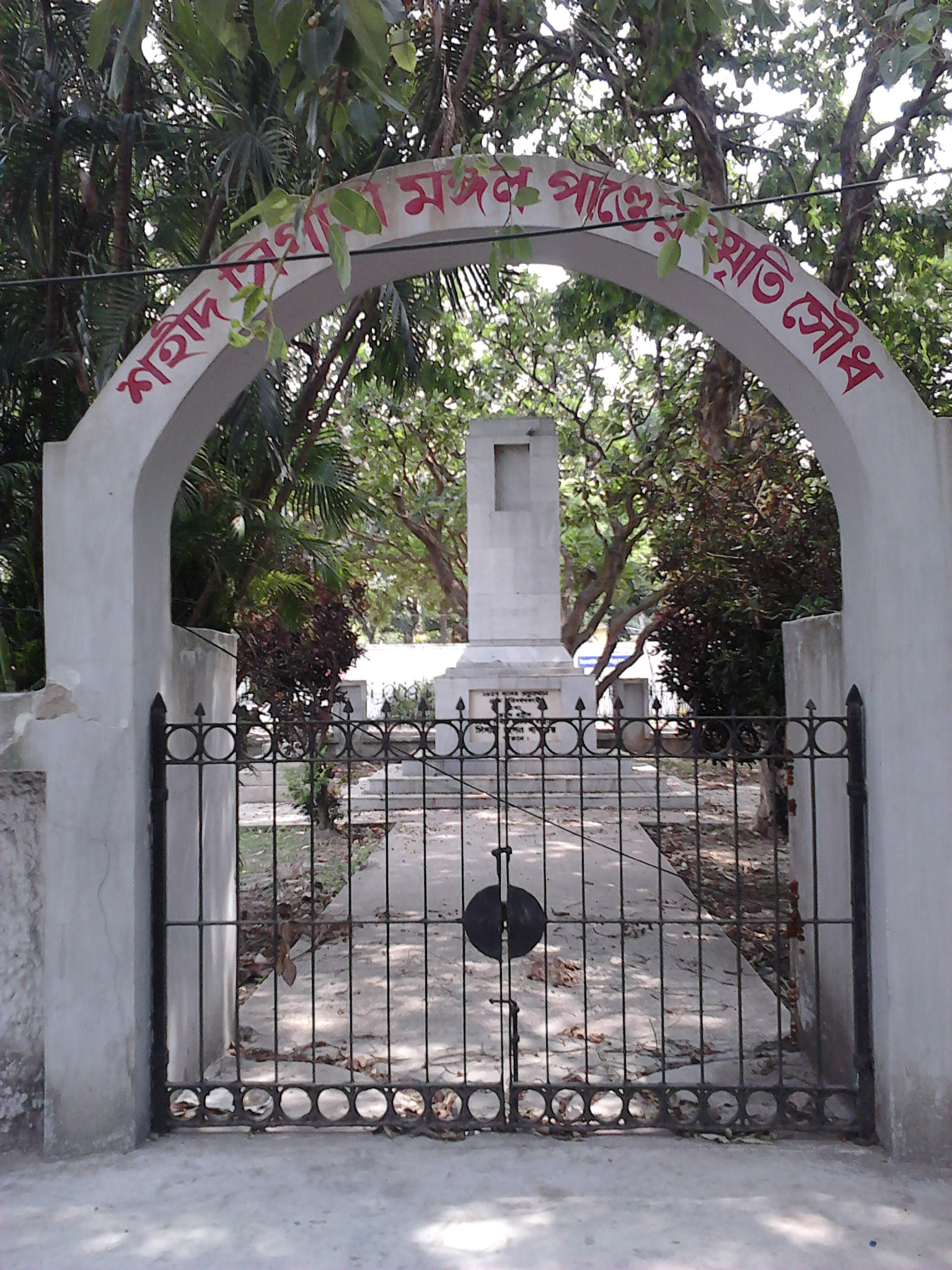
Mangal Pandey cenotaph

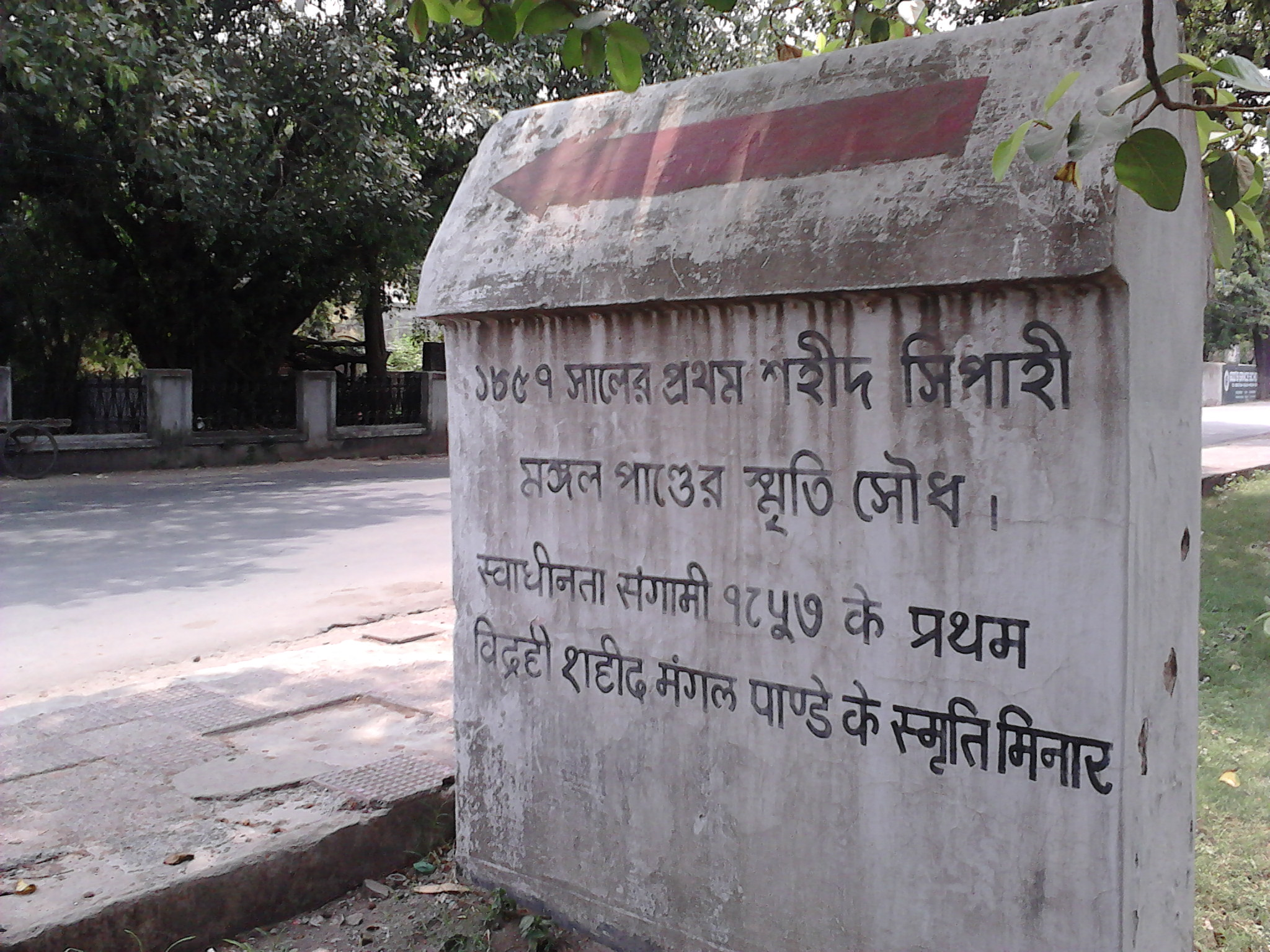
Mangal Pandey cenotaph

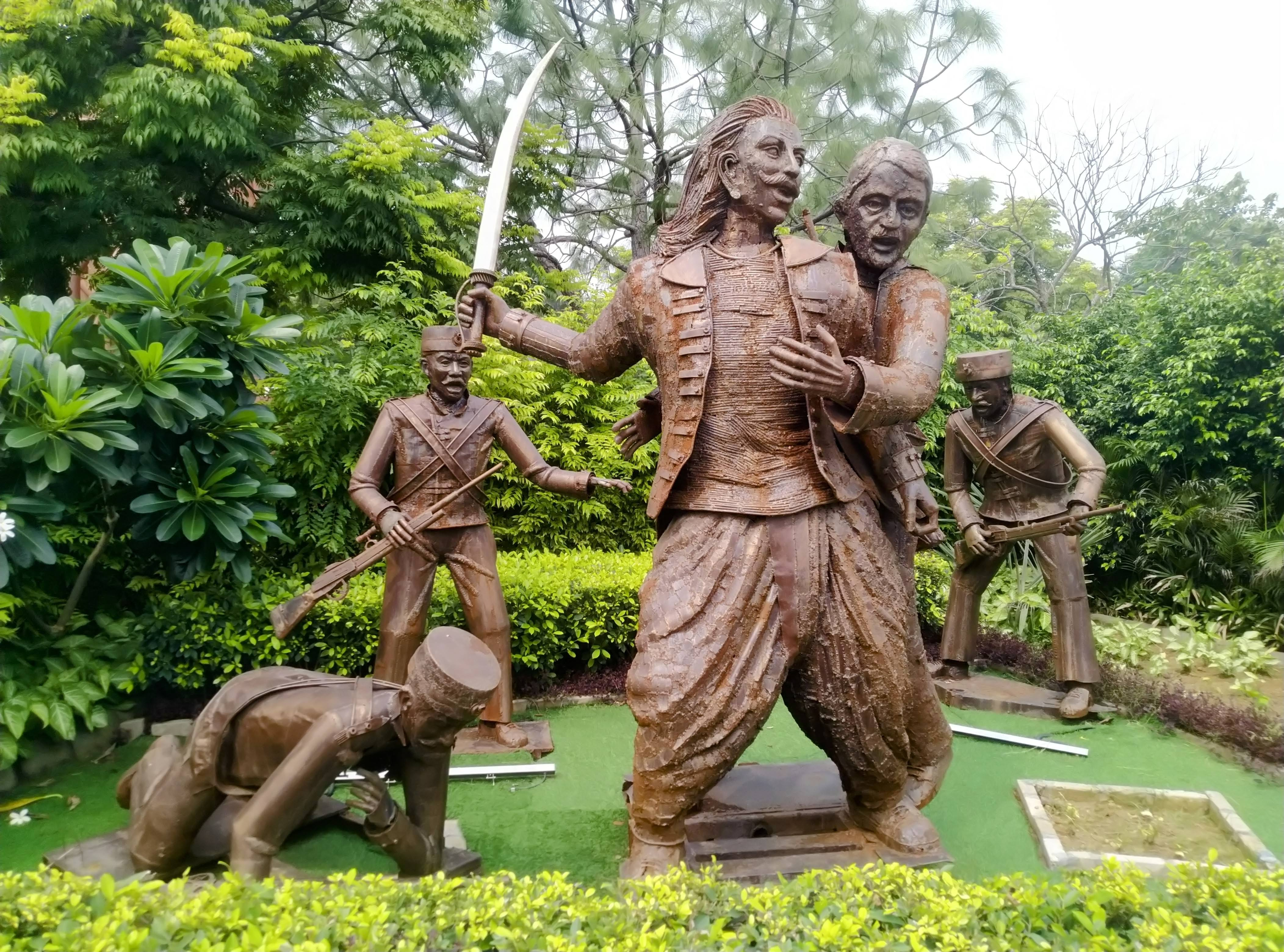
Statue of Mangal Pandey

=== Zoo ===
Asia's first zoo was established at Barrackpore. It was built by Lord Wellesley in the 19th century. There is an aviary built in magnificent Gothic architecture. The zoo had animals such as the African donkey, tiger, bear, bison, leopard, mouse deer, kangaroos, monkeys and various species of birds.

Lord Wellesley felt the need of making a detailed description of the animals in Asia. This was primarily because the Europeans were mostly ignorant when it came to the category of Indian animals. He started working on the first Natural Research Center in Asia, the 'National Heritage of India'. Various animals were required to be collected. Barrackpore Zoo was built to store these animals and birds. Until 1804, ₹2,791 was invested in the cost of maintenance of these animals and birds.

Between 1802-1803, only three zoos were open to the general public in the world. The first was in Vienna (1765), the second in Madrid (1775), and the third in Paris (1795). The Zoological Society of London was not yet formed (to be formed in 1826). London Zoo was still a long way off, having started in 1828, and was still 43 years late for the general public. Subjects did not have access to the royal zoo. During such time, sixteen miles north of Calcutta, Barrackpore, the first zoo in India, the first in Asia and probably the fourth in the world, opened to the general public. This revolutionary work in the history of naturalism in the world was done by a man of the East India Company, the Governor General of India, Lord Richard Wellesley, the first Marquess Wellesley.

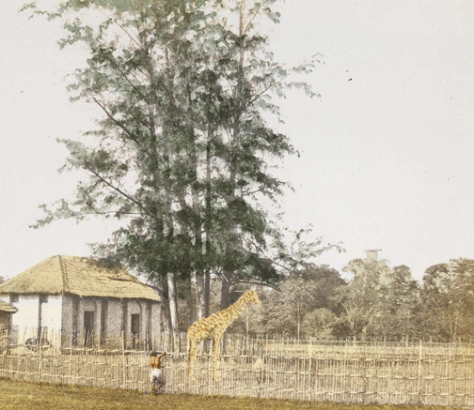
Barrackpore Zoo (1851)

Later, due to a decrease in funds by East India Company to run the zoo, the birds and animala (like elephant and tigers) were distributed to kings of princely states.

=== Barrackpore park ===
Between 1798–1805, Lord Wellesley was the governor of Kolkata and he created a picturesque garden on the banks of the Ganges in Barrackpore spreading across 1006 bighas of land. This garden is today, called Laat Bagan or Mangal Pandey Park.Right next to this garden, he built a gigantic house which resembled no less than a castle. Later, this house was named Barrackpore Government House. It was called Country House by the British. It also had a hospital at that time. For transport he made a road from Barrackpore to Shyambazar, now known as B.T. Road.

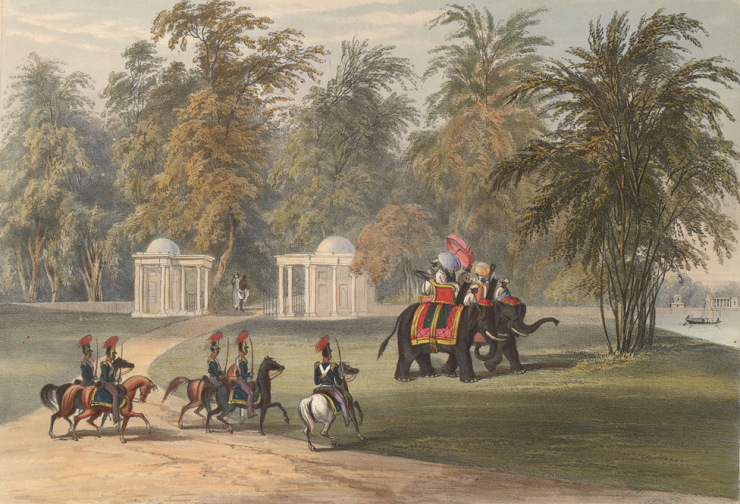
Barrackpore Park (1848)

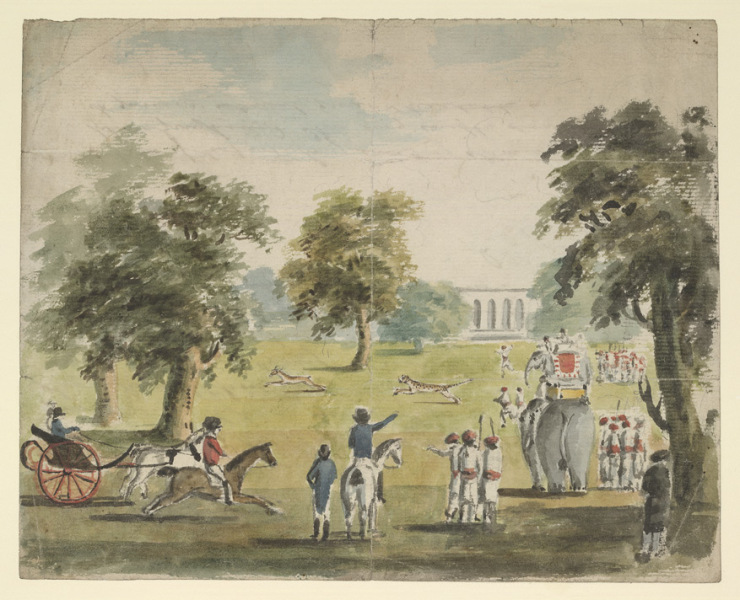
Barrackpore Park (1802)

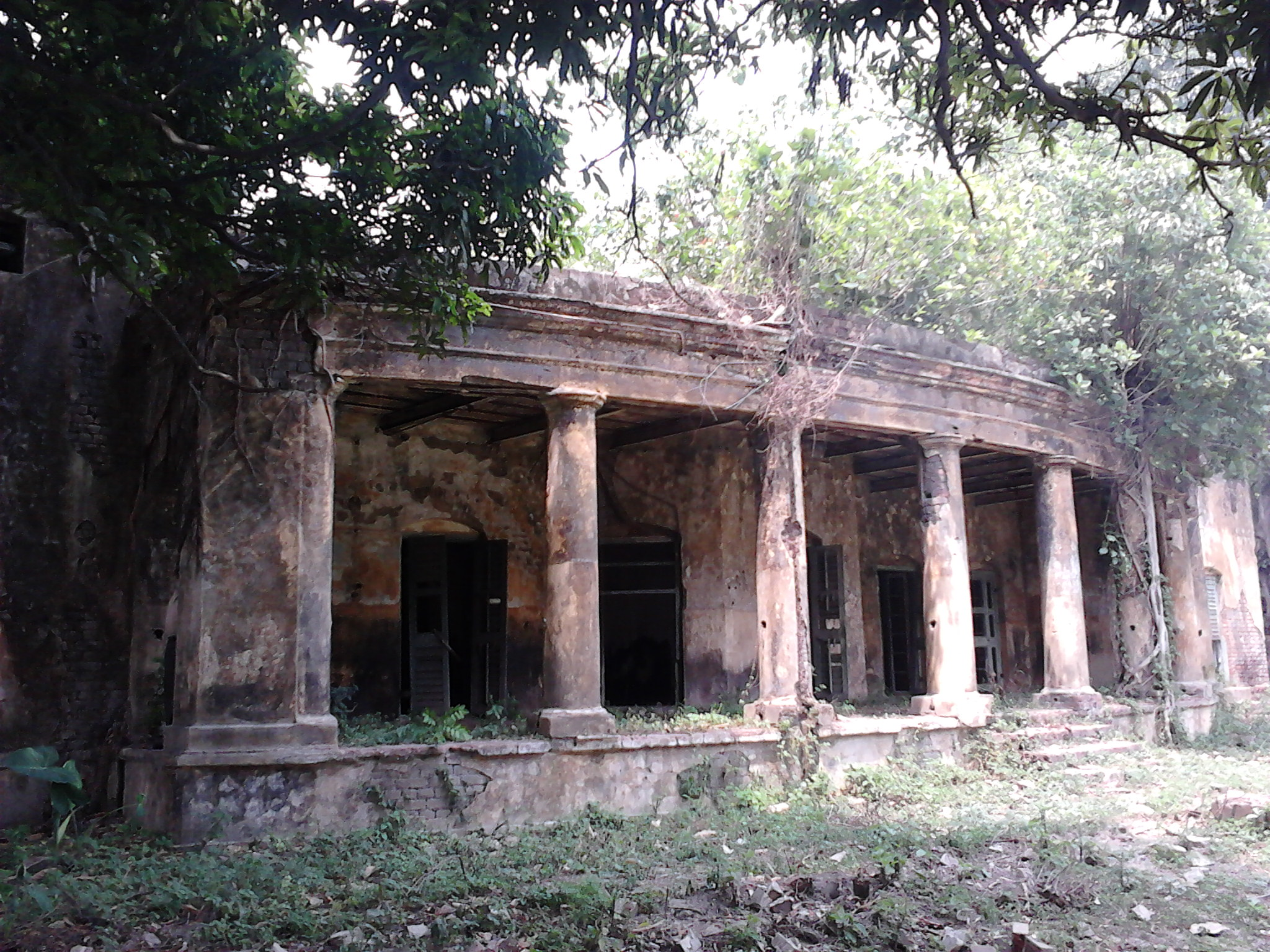
Abandoned British Bungalow

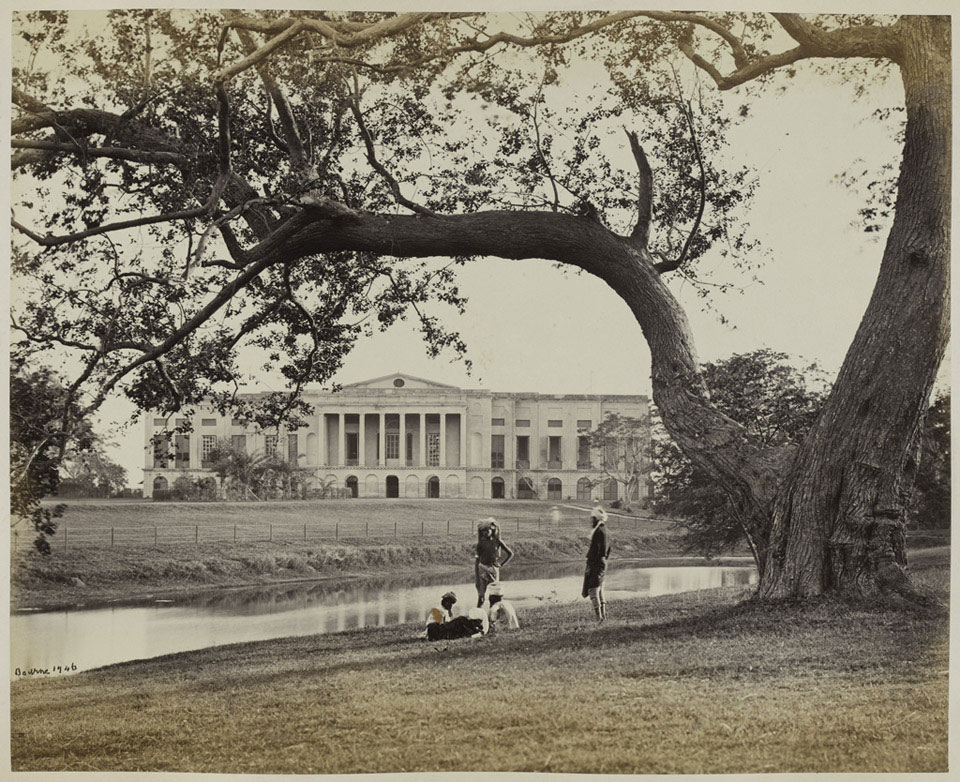
Government House, Barrackpore (1865)

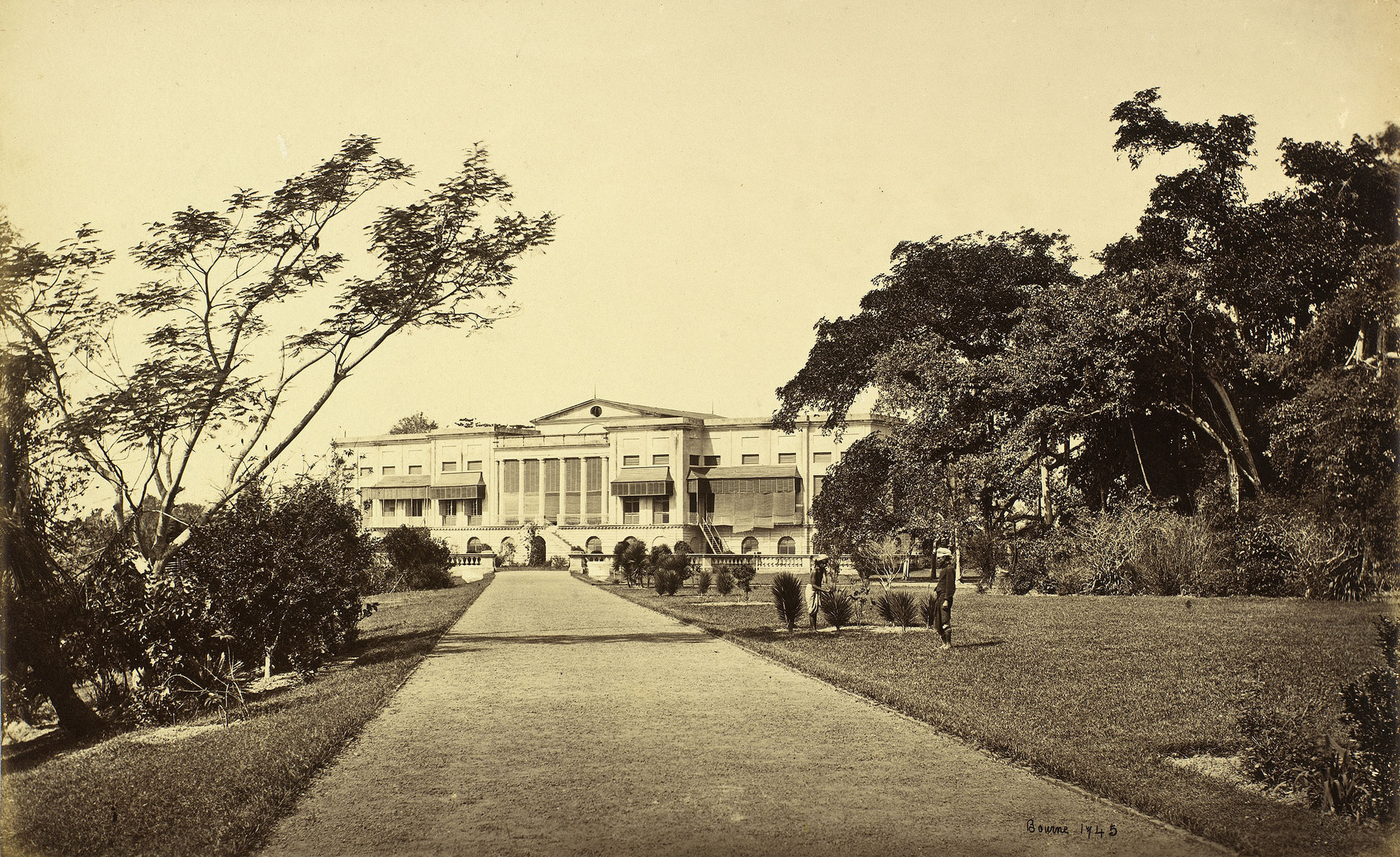
Barrackpore House (1875)

== Geography ==
Cities and towns in the northern portion of Barrackpore subdivision in North 24 Parganas district
M: municipality/town, CT: census town,
N: neighbourhood, OG: outgrowth
Owing to space constraints in the small map, the actual locations in a larger map may vary slightly.

Barrackpore is bounded by North Barrackpur and Jaffarpur to the north, Mohanpur, Chak Kanthalia, Ruiya and Patulia to the east, Titagarh to the south, and the Hooghly and Barrackpur Cantonment to the west.

Cities and towns in the southern portion of Barrackpore subdivision in North 24 Parganas district
M: municipality/ town, CT: census town,
N: neighbourhood/ administrative location
Owing to space constraints in the small map, the actual locations in a larger map may vary slightly.

=== Background ===
Historically, the town was a military and administrative center under British rule and was the scene of several acts of rebellion against Britain during the 19th century. The oldest cantonment in India and the Police Training Academy in West Bengal are both located in Barrackpore. Barrackpore is also the seat for the Sub-Divisional Court of North 24 Parganas District in West Bengal. It was also one of the earliest known places in India, where the sport of cricket was introduced and played during the Colonial era.

=== Location ===
96% of the population of Barrackpore subdivision (presented in the maps alongside) live in urban areas. In 2011, it had a density of population of 10,967 per km^{2}. The subdivision has 16 municipalities and 24 census towns.

For most of the cities/ towns, information regarding density of population is available in the Infobox. Population data is not available for neighbourhoods. It is available for the entire municipal area and thereafter ward-wise.

All places marked on the map are linked in the full-screen map.

Barrackpore is bounded by North Barrackpur and Jafarpur on the north, Mohanpur, Chak Kanthalia, Ruiya and Patulia on the east, Titagarh on the south, and the Hooghly and Barrackpur Cantonment on the west.

=== Police station ===
Titagarh police station under Barrackpore Police Commissionerate has jurisdiction over Barrackpore Municipal area.

=== Post offices ===
Barrackpore Head Post Office is one of the two head post offices of Barrackpore Division (formerly known as North Presidency Division) of North 24 Parganas district. It is a delivery post office, with PIN 700120. Other post offices with the same PIN are Monirampur, Nayapally, Orderly Bazar, Vivekananda Math, Barrackpore Bazar, Barrackpore Government Housing and Ghoshpara Road.

Sewli Telenipara is a delivery branch post office, with PIN 700121 in the Barrackpore Division of North 24 Parganas district. Other post offices with the same PIN are Nilganj Bazaar Sub Post Office, Beraberia BO and Suryapur BO.

Anandapuri is a non-delivery sub post office, with PIN 700122 in the Barrackpore Division of North 24 Parganas district. Other post offices having the same PIN are Nonachandanpukur (delivery office) and Jafarpur.

Barrackpore RS is a non-delivery sub post office, with PIN 700123 in the Barrackpore Division of North 24 Parganas district. Other post offices having the same PIN are Panpara and Talpukur (delivery office).

== Climate ==
Barrackpore has been ranked 30th best "National Clean Air City" under (Category 2 3-10L Population cities) in India.

== Demographics ==
=== Population ===
Historical population
Year	Pop.	±%
1901	19,307	—
1911	27,605	+43.0%
1921	22,460	−18.6%
1931	14,413	−35.8%
1941	21,773	+51.1%
1951	42,639	+95.8%
1961	63,778	+49.6%
1971	96,889	+51.9%
1981	115,516	+19.2%
1991	142,557	+23.4%
2001	144,391	+1.3%
2011	152,783	+5.8%
2021	198,000	+29.6%

As per the 2011 Census of India, Barrackpore had a total population of 152,783, of which 78,349 (51%) were males and 74,434 (49%) were females. Population below 6 years was 11,786. The total number of literates in Barrackpore was 125,144 (88.76% of the population over 6 years).

As of the 2001 India Census, Barrackpore had a population of 144,331. Men constitute 53% of the population and women 47%. Barrackpore has an average literacy rate of 81%, higher than the national average of 59.5%. 8% of the population is under 6 years of age.

The majority of the population is Bengali and Hindu.

=== Languages ===
Languages spoken in Barrackpore City (2011)
1. Bengali (76.2%)
2. Hindi (15.6%)
3. Urdu (5.08%)
4. Telugu (0.94%)
5. Odia (0.75%)
6. Others (0.86%)

=== Kolkata Urban Agglomeration ===
The following municipalities, census towns and other locations in Barrackpore subdivision were part of Kolkata Urban Agglomeration in the 2011 census: Kanchrapara (M), Jetia (CT), Halisahar (M), Balibhara (CT), Naihati (M), Bhatpara (M), Kaugachhi (CT), Garshyamnagar (CT), Garulia (M), Ichhapur Defence Estate (CT), North Barrackpur (M), Barrackpur Cantonment (CB), Barrackpore (M), Jafarpur (CT), Ruiya (CT), Titagarh (M), Khardaha (M), Bandipur (CT), Panihati (M), Muragachha (CT) New Barrackpore (M), Chandpur (CT), Talbandha (CT), Patulia (CT), Kamarhati (M), Baranagar (M), South Dumdum (M), North Dumdum (M), Dum Dum (M), Noapara (CT), Babanpur (CT), Teghari (CT), Nanna (OG), Chakla (OG), Srotribati (OG) and Panpur (OG).

== Infrastructure ==
As per the District Census Handbook 2011, Barrackpore Municipal city covered an area of 10.61 km^{2} (4.10 sq mi). Amongst the civic amenities it had 172.63 km of roads and open drains. Amongst the medical facilities It had 40 medicine shops. Amongst the educational facilities It had 62 primary schools, 12 middle schools, one secondary school, 11 senior secondary schools and three non-formal education centres. Amongst the social, recreational and cultural facilities it had one old age home, six auditoriums/ community halls, two public libraries and six reading rooms. Amongst the commodities manufactured were cottage industry and confectionery items. It had 11 bank branches.

See also Cities and towns in Barrackpore subdivision.

== Transport ==
=== Road ===
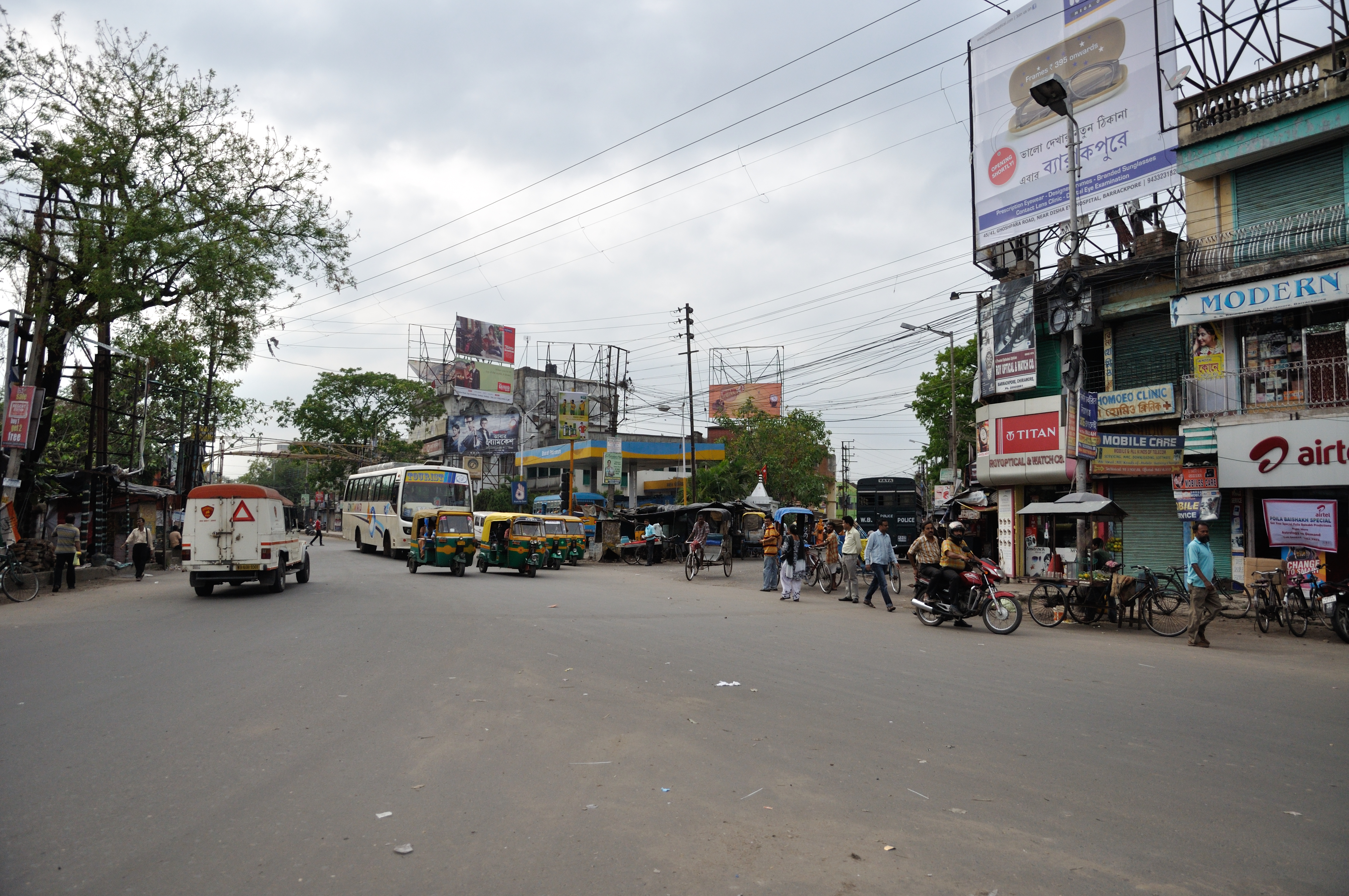
Barrackpore Chiria More is the junction of Barrackpore Trunk Road and Surendranath Banerjee Road.

Barrackpore Trunk Road (B.T. Road) (part of both SH 1 and SH 2) connects Barrackpore Chiria More with Shyambazar. Ghoshpara Road connects Barrackpore railway station area with Kanchrapara and goes on to link with the adjacent district of Nadia. Surendranath Banerjee Road connects Manirampore with Barrackpore railway station area via Barrackpore Chiria More. Barrackpore-Barasat Road (part of SH 2) starts at Lalkuthi and goes up to Barasat via Nilganj. Many buses ply along these roads. Barrackpore Rail Overbridge was opened in 2013 at Lalkuthi to make transport-communication easier and smoother.

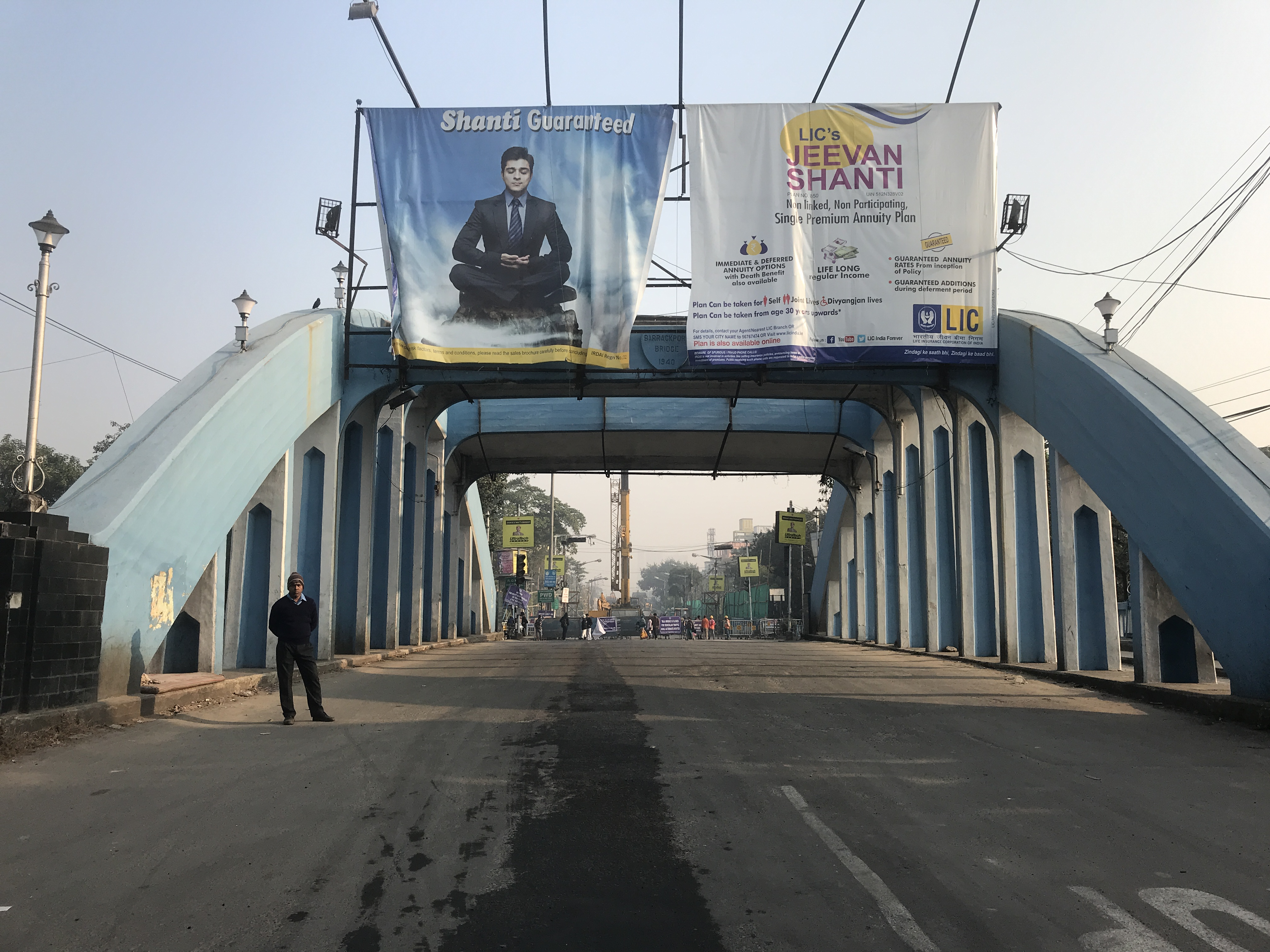
Tala Bridge, Barrackpore Trunk Road (BT Road) is a four-laned road in Kolkata, India. It connects Shyambazar 5-point crossing with Barrackpore Chiria More.

=== WBTC bus routes ===
- E32 Nilgunj Depot - Howrah Station
- ACT-32 Barrackpore - Howrah Station
- AC54B Barrackpore - Howrah Station
- ACT-38 Barrackpore - Karunamoyee
- S11 Nilgunj Depot - Esplanade
- S32 Barrackpore - Howrah Station
- S58 Barrackpore - Karunamoyee
- AC20 Barrackpore - Santragachi
- C29 Barasat - Barrackpore Mistry Ghat
- DS-34 Barrackpore - Barasat

=== Private bus routes ===
- 78 Esplanade — Barrackpore
- 81 Barasat — Fishery Gate
- 81/1 Barasat — Rajchandrapur
- 85 Kanchrapara — Barrackpore Court
- MM5 Habra — Barrackpore Court

=== Bus routes without numbers ===
- Barrackpore - Howrah Station
- Barasat - Kamalpur
- Naihati - Egra
- Barrackpore - Salap
- Dhulagarh- Barrackpore

=== SBSTC routes ===
- Haldia - Barrackpore
- Naihati - Digha
- Kanchrapara - Digha
- Barrackpore - Durgapur
- Kalyani - Digha
- Barrackpore - Digha

=== Railways ===
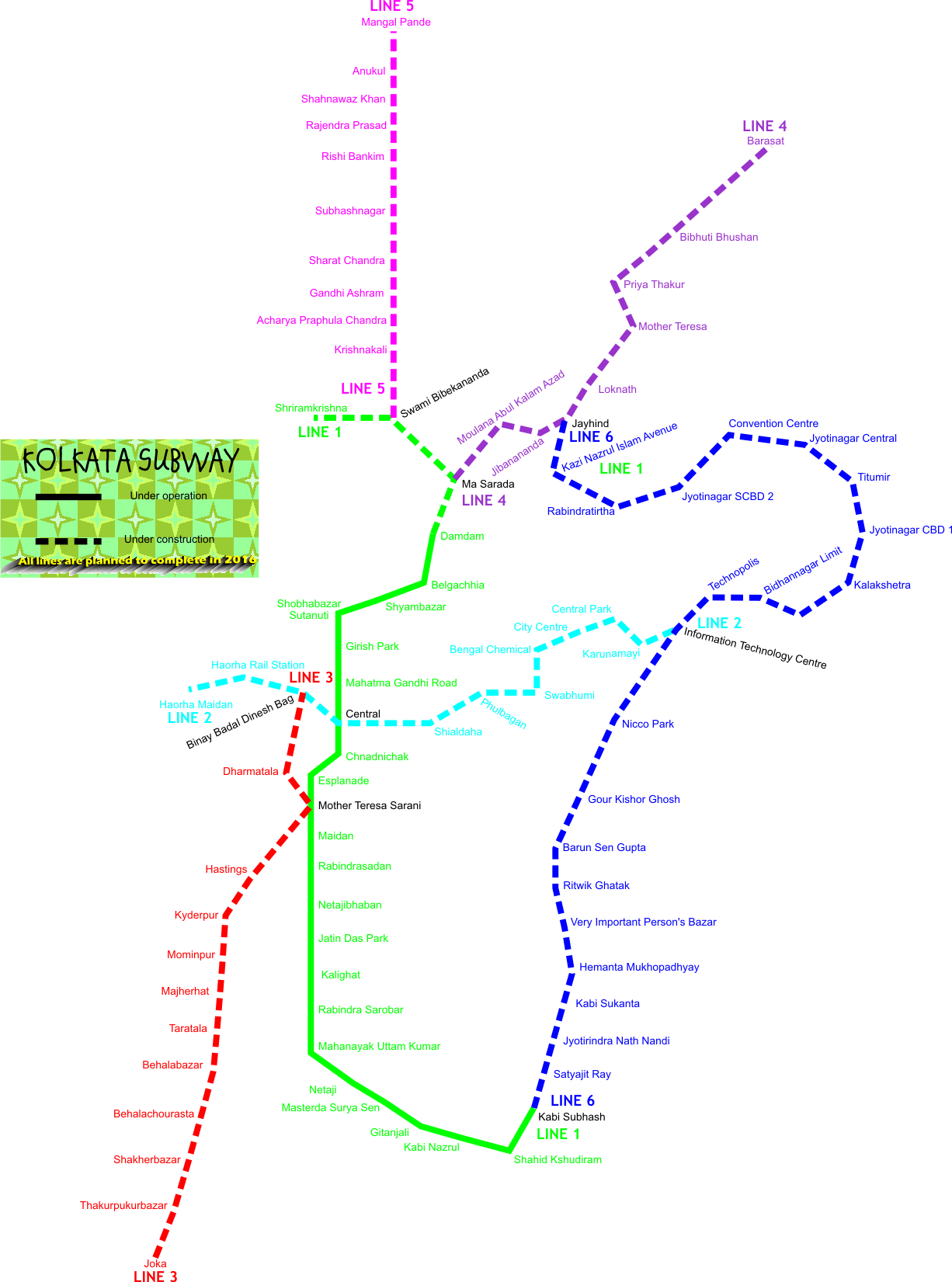
Kolkata new proposed Metro Pink Line (Baranagar - Barrackpore)

Barrackpore has been serviced by rail since 1862. It takes about 35–40 minutes by suburban train to reach Barrackpore railway station from Sealdah Station. The Sealdah-Ranaghat Line runs through this city and connects to Howrah, Kolkata, Budge Budge, Kalyani, Ranaghat, Krishnanagar, Shantipur, Gede, Bandel, Burdwan, and Katwa. It is part of the Kolkata Suburban Railway system. Former Rail Minister Mamata Banerjee announced the extension of Metro Rail project to Barrackpore (Pink Line) which was later shelved infinitely. The Barrackpore Racecourse railway station was constructed in 1927 for race special train. This railway station is now abandoned and used by the Indian army only.

=== Ferry ===
There are three ferry ghats in Barrackpore. Barrackpore Ferry Ghat links to Jugal Adhya Ferry Ghat across the Hooghly River in Serampore. Babaji Ghat at Monirampore links to Chatra Char Poisar Ghat at Serampore and Dui Poisar Ghat links to Sheoraphuli Ghat.

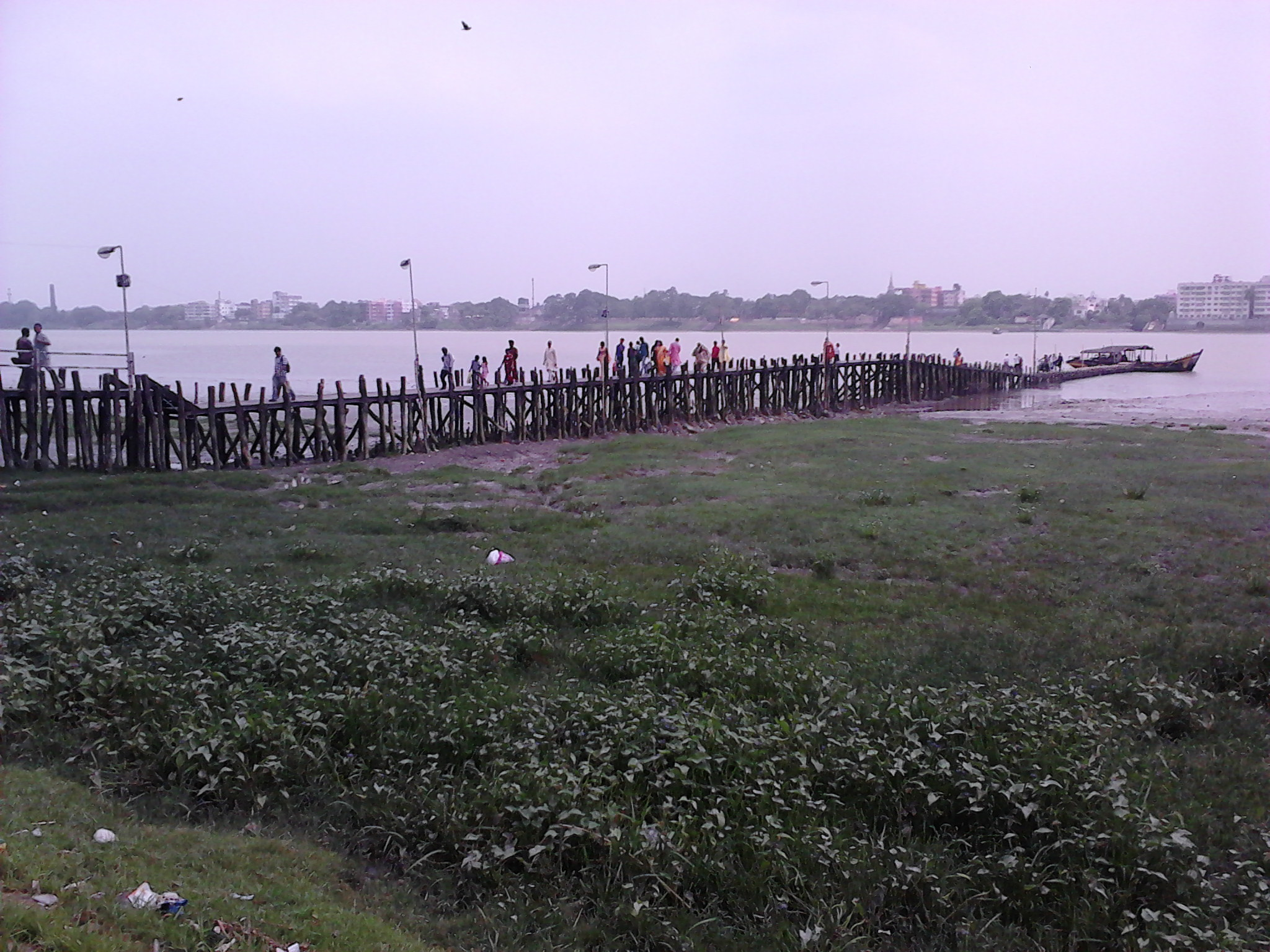
Dhobi Ghat, Barrackpore cantonment

=== Air ===
Barrackpore Air Force Station is an Indian Air Force base located at Barrackpore. It is one of the oldest stations in the IAF, operating transport units. One of the Mi-17 squadrons is based here. Netaji Subhash Chandra Bose International Airport in Dum Dum, Kolkata is the nearest airport.

== Education ==
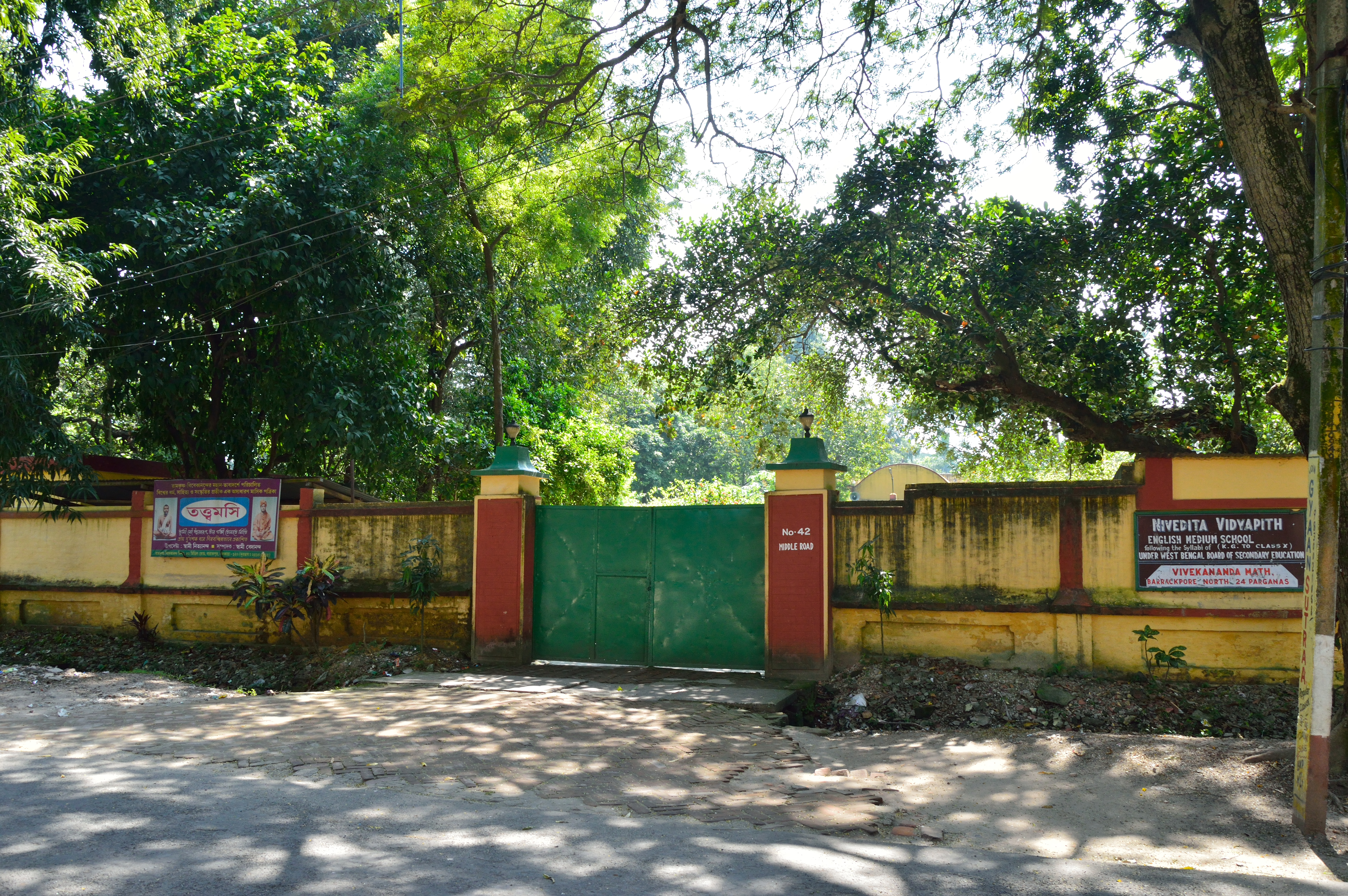
Nivedita Vidyapith, Barrackpore cantonment

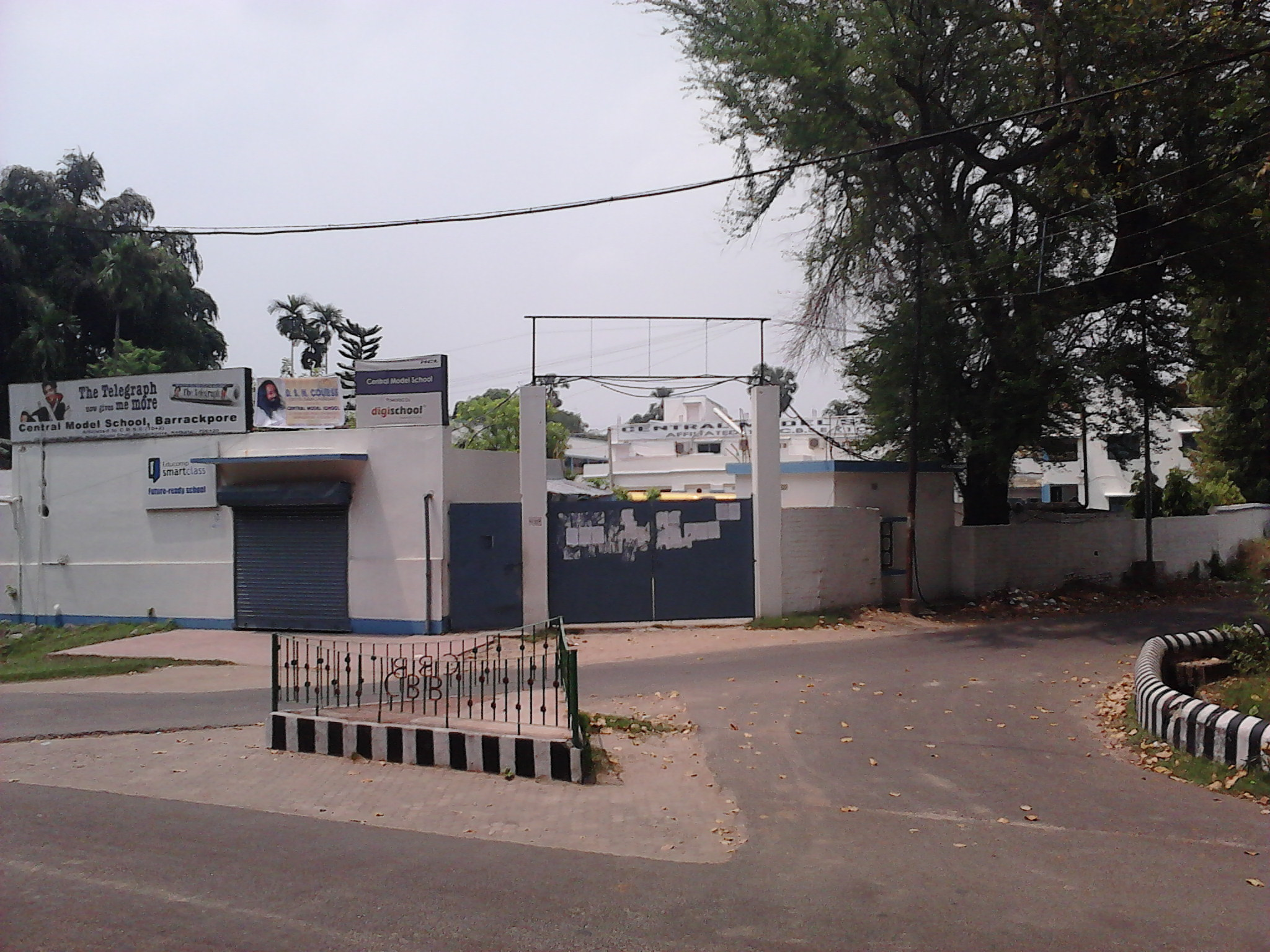
Central Model School, Barrackpore cantonment

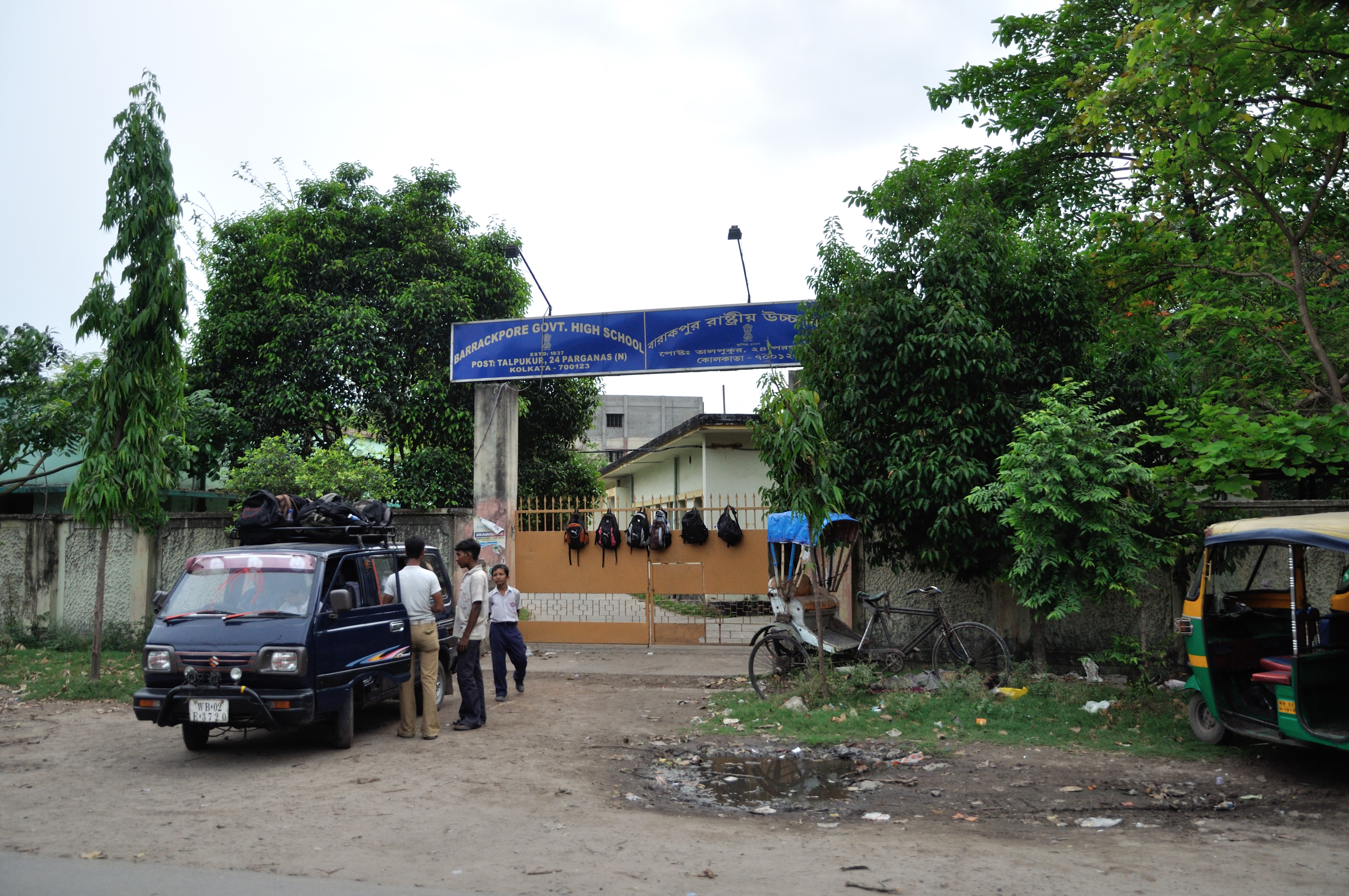
Barrackpore Government High School, BT road

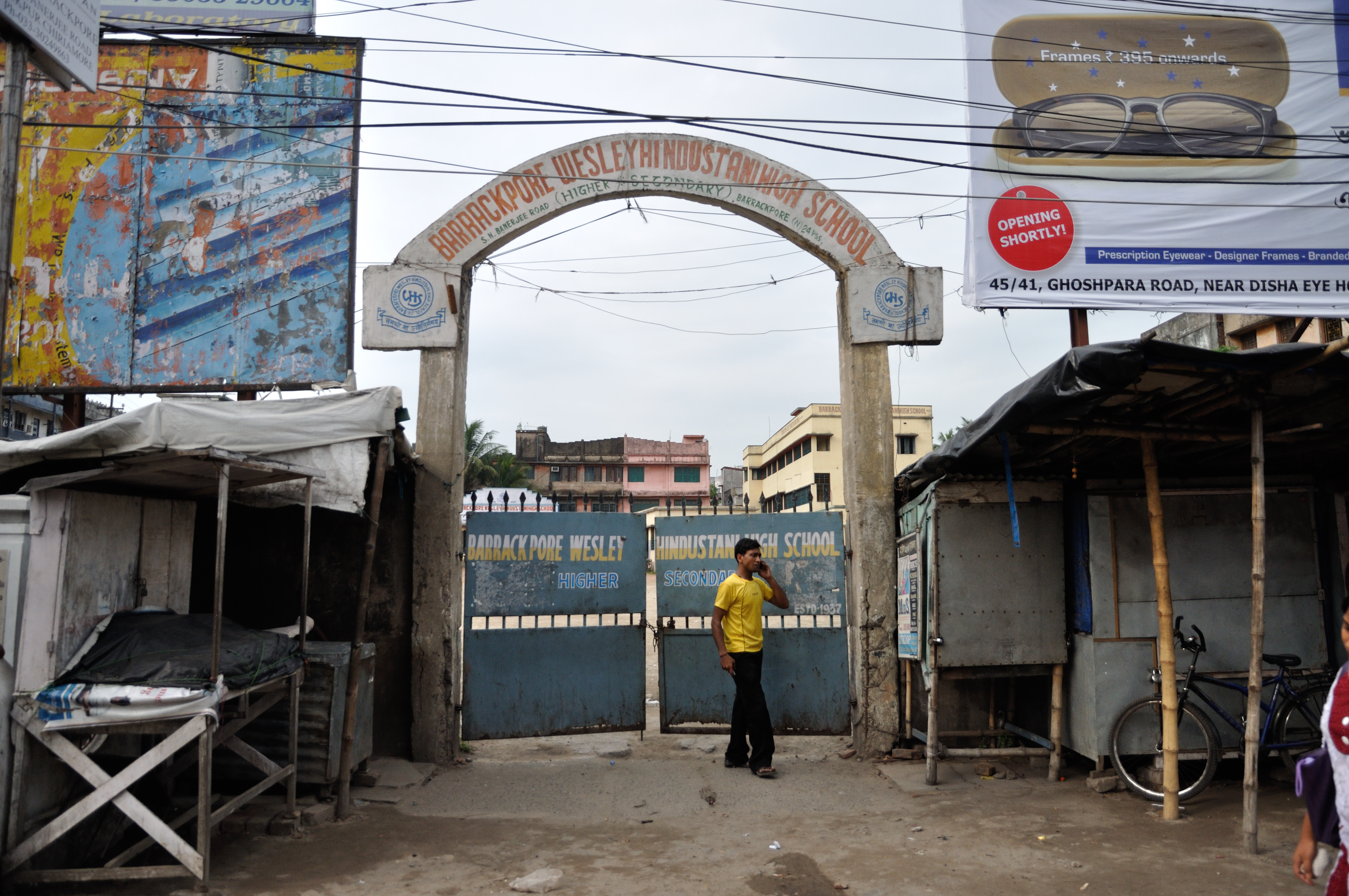
Barrackpore Wesley Hindustani High School

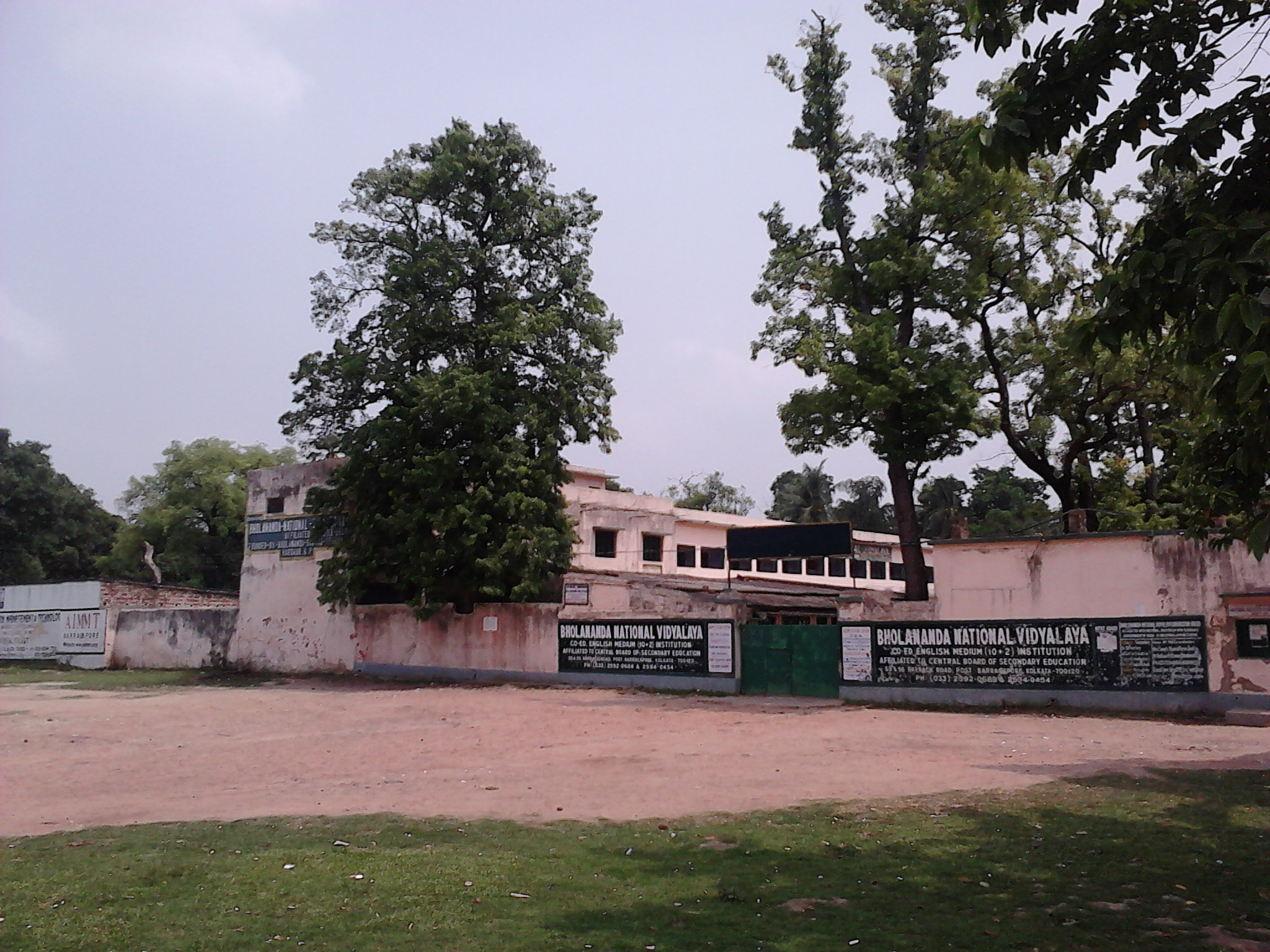
Bholananda National Vidyalaya

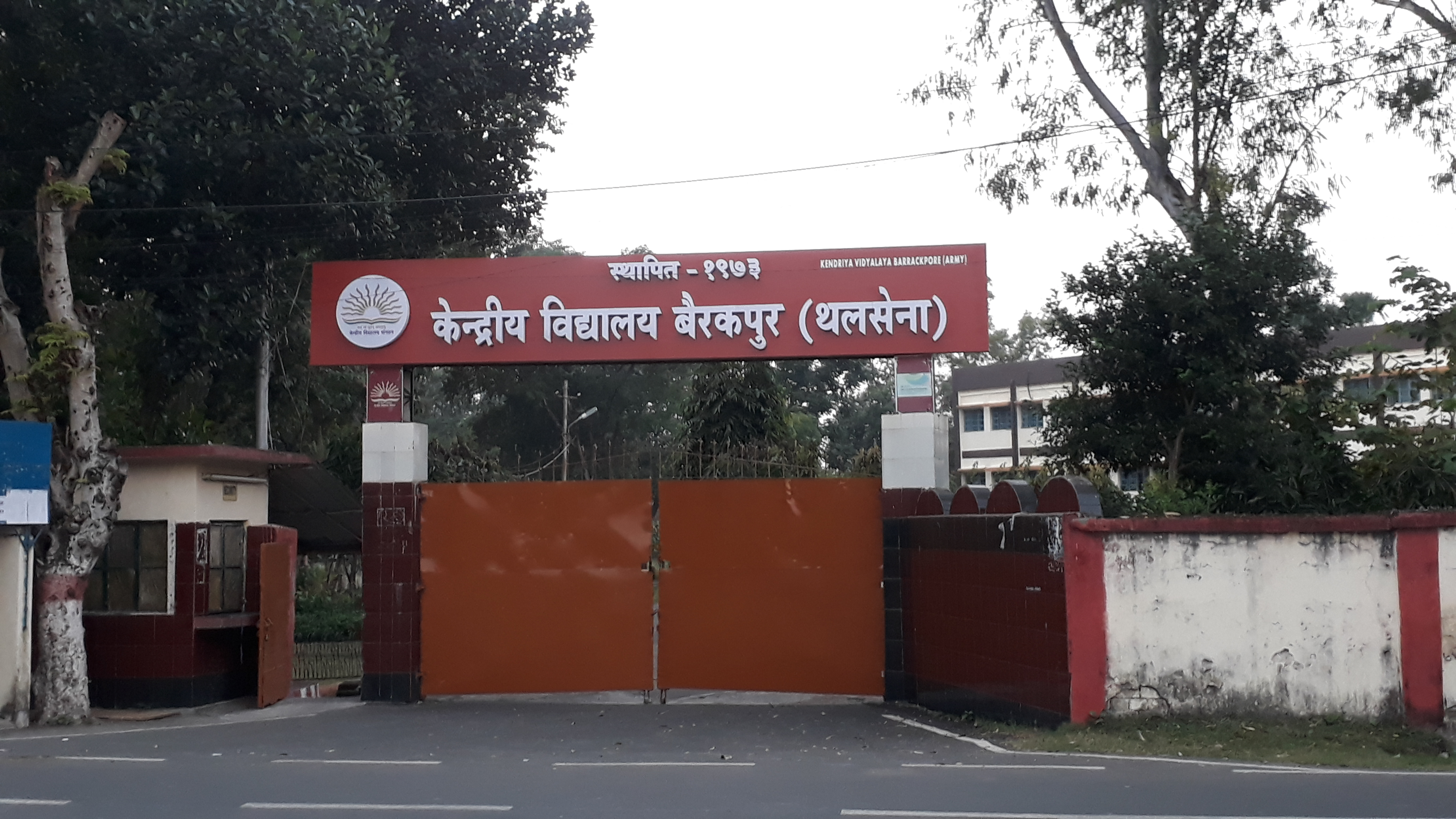
Kendriya Vidyalaya, Barrackpore

Notable schools include in Barrackpore include St. Claret School, St. Augustine's Day School Douglas Memorial Higher Secondary School, Modern English Academy School, Bholananda National Vidyalaya, Central Model School, Barrackpore Government High School, JDS Public School, Panpur, Adamas International School and Army Public School.

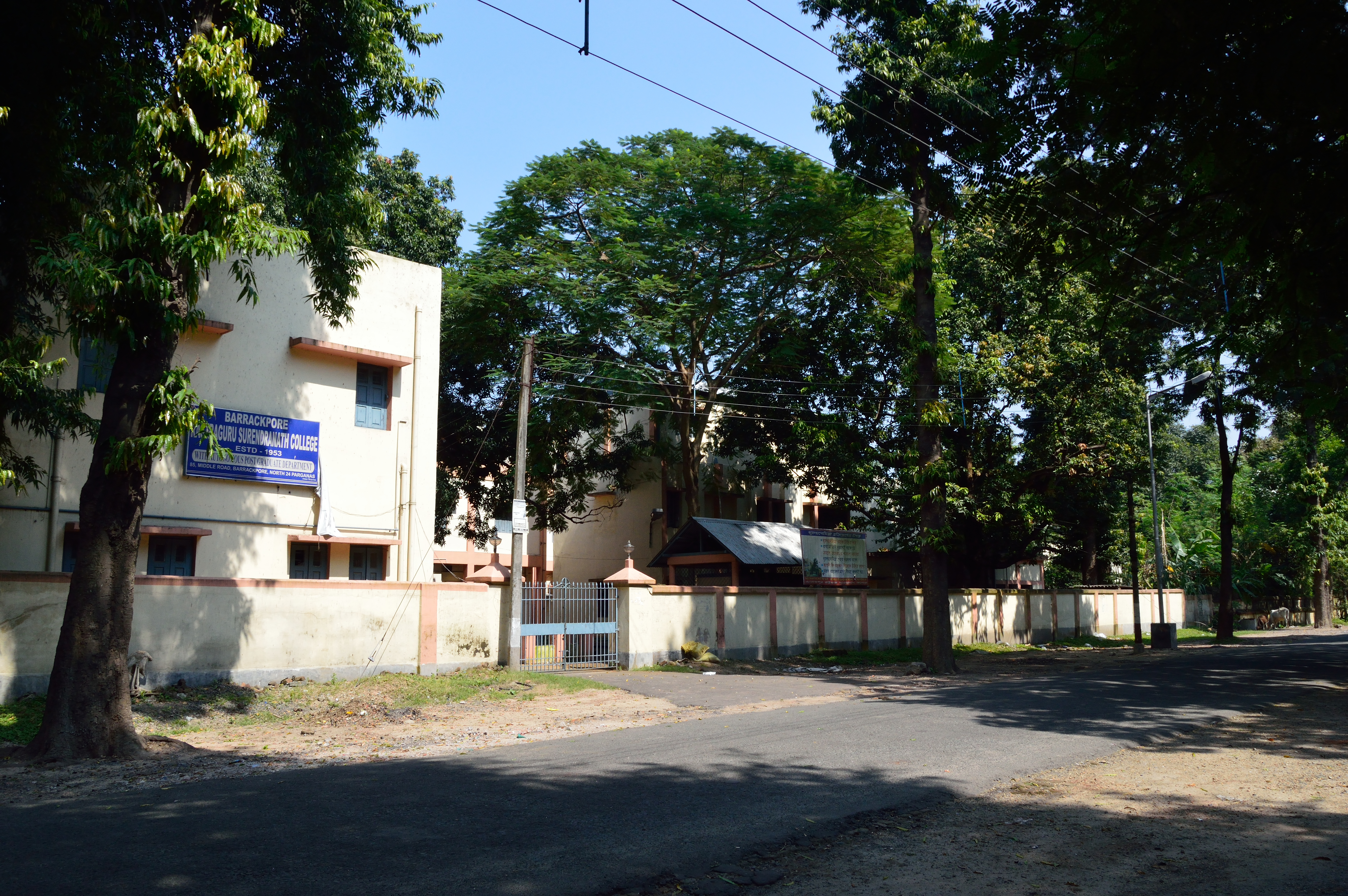
Barrackpore Rastraguru Surendranath College

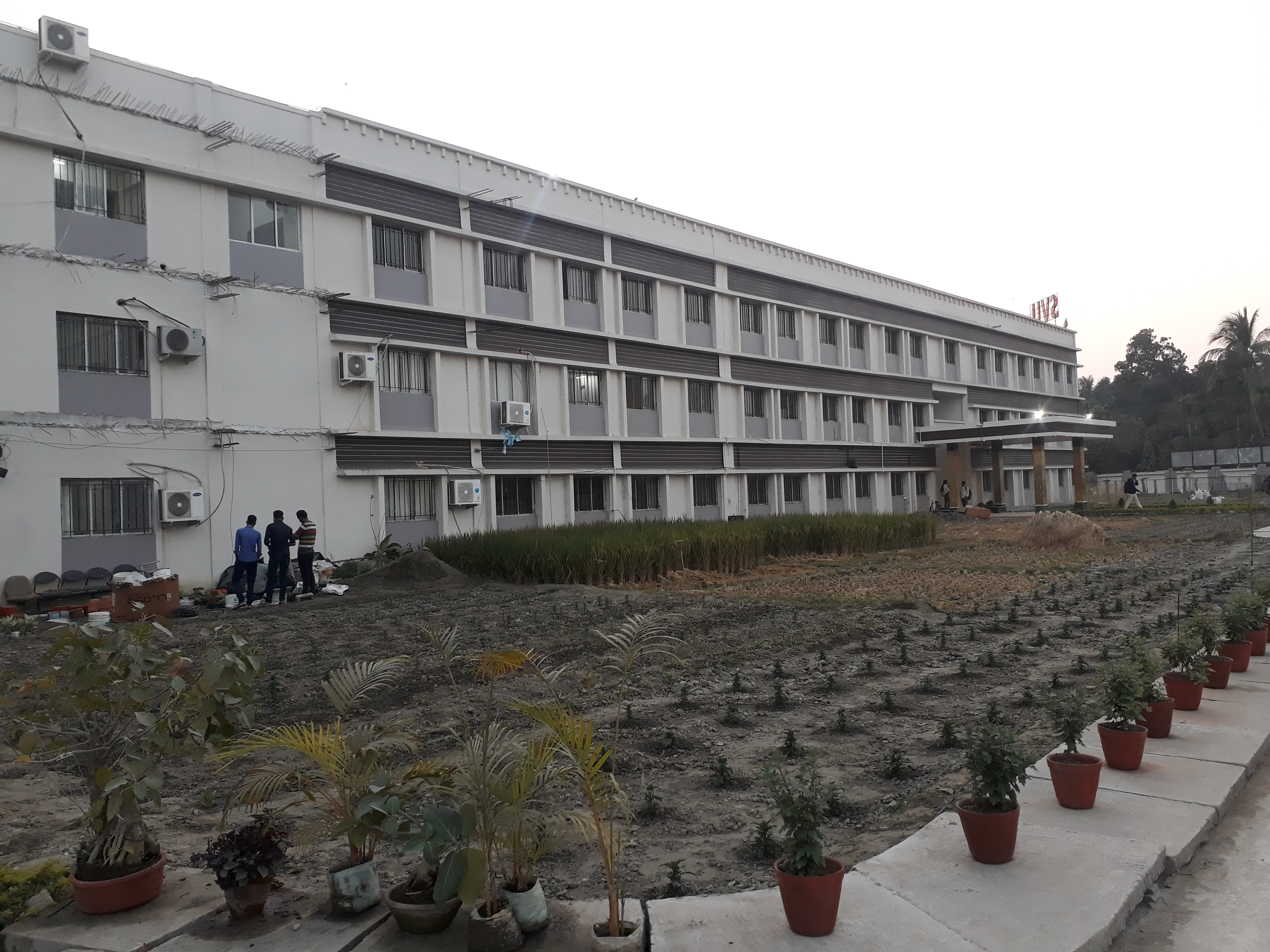
Swami Vivekananda University campus

Among the colleges located in Barrackpore are Barrackpore Rastraguru Surendranath College and Mahadevananda Mahavidyalaya. The area also has two engineering colleges, St. Mary's Technical Campus Kolkata being affiliated to AICTE. Central Research Institute for Jute and Allied Fibers is also there.

== Healthcare ==
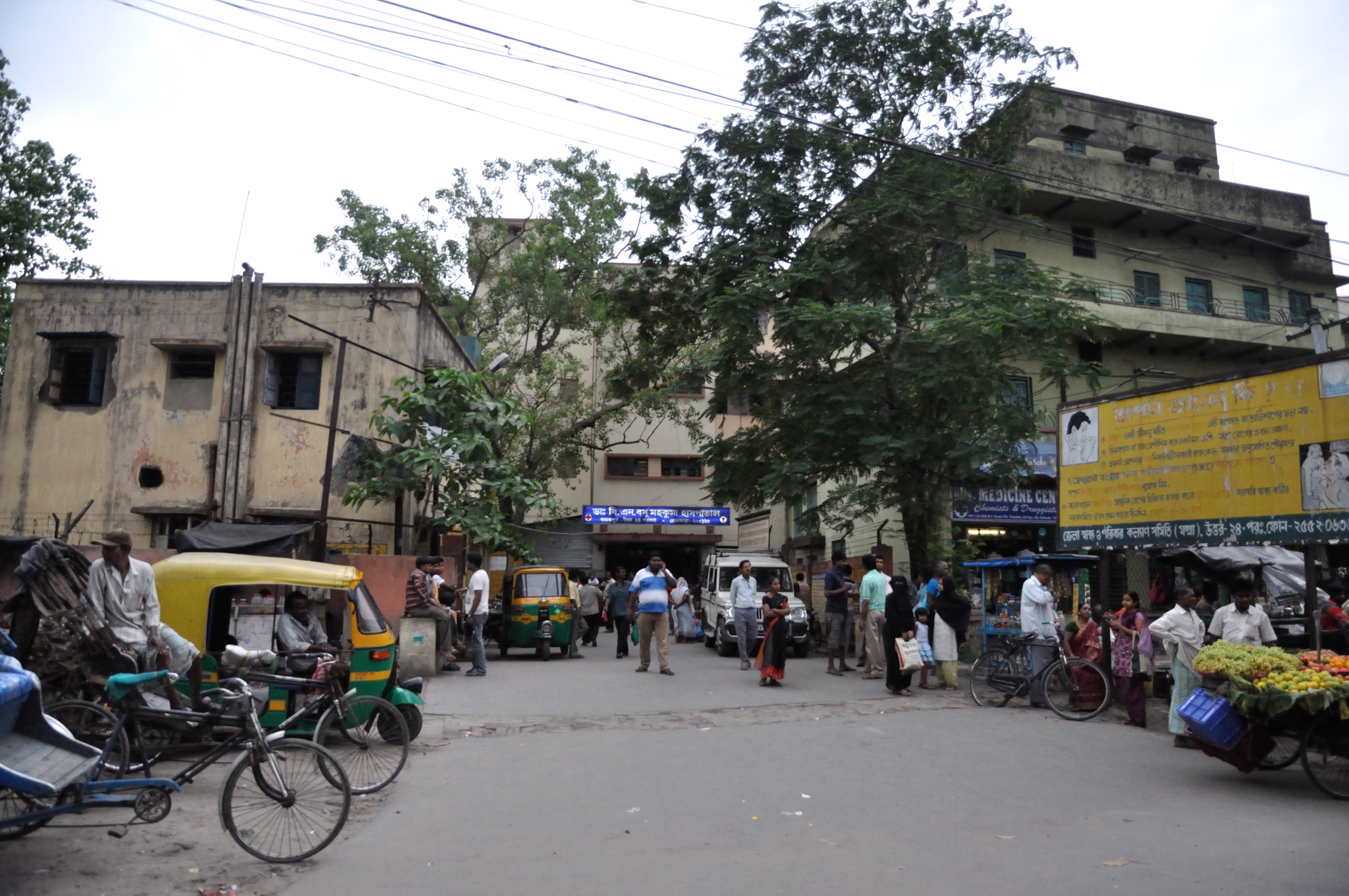
B.N. Bose Subdivisional Hospital, B.T. Road

Medical facilities available in Barrackpore are B.N. Bose Subdivisional Hospital (with 200 beds), Barrackpore Cantonment Hospital (with 48 beds), Barrackpore Police Case Hospital (with 6 beds) and Police Brigade Hospital (with 120 beds). Amongst the private medical facilities are Barrackpore Multispeciality Hospital, Sarada Seva Sadan, Panacea Nursing Home, Nehru Memorial Techno Global Hospital, Barrackpore City Hospital, Barrackpore Medical Research Center, Disha Eye Hospital and Disha Cataract and Refractive Surgi Centre, Prova Eye Foundation.

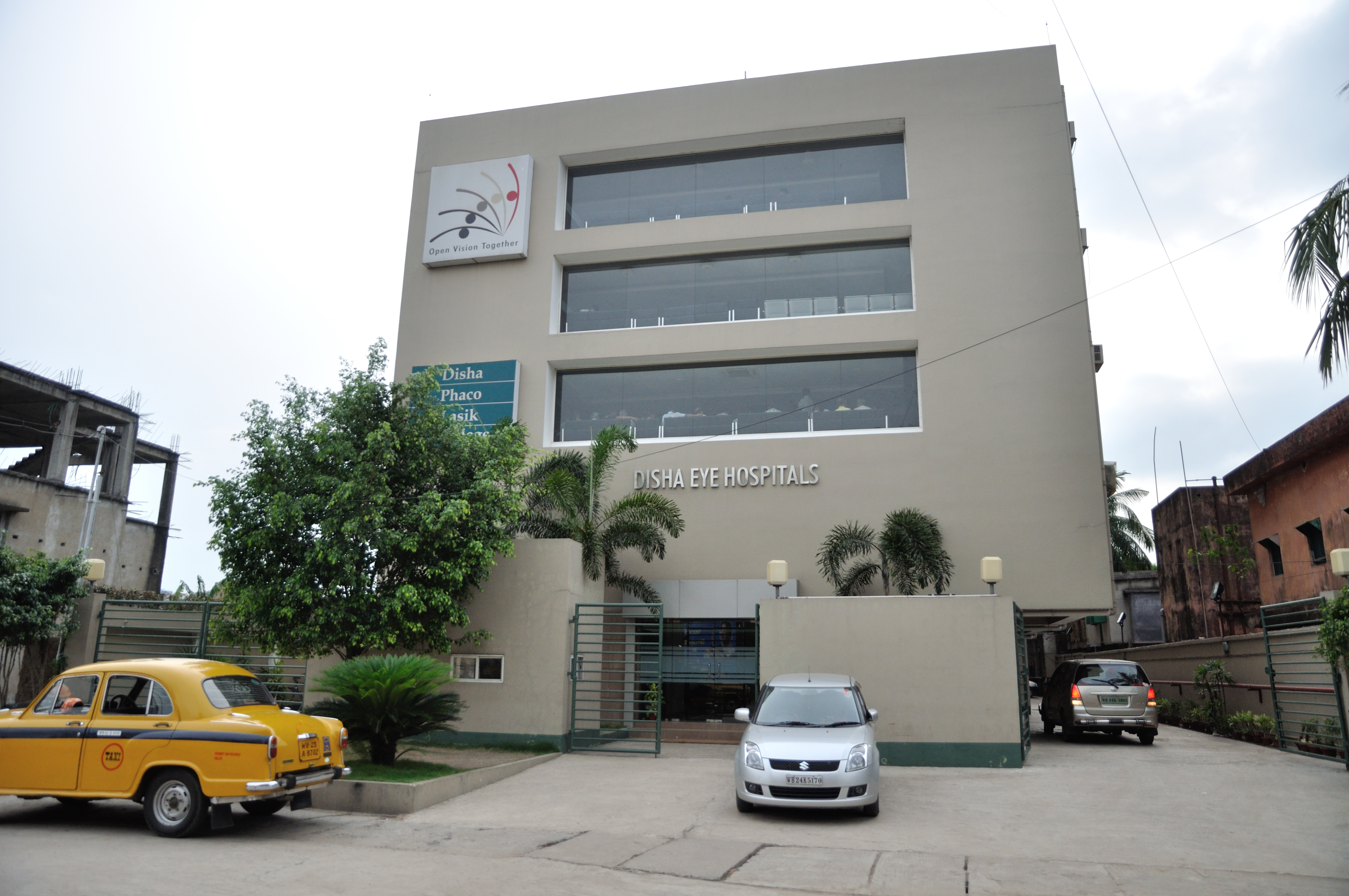
Disha Eye Hospitals, Ghosh Para Road

== Notable Resident ==
- M. J. Akbar
- Bibhutibhushan Bandyopadhyay, Indian Writer
- Surendranath Banerjee
- Ritwick Chakraborty, Indian Filmmmker
- Mangal Pandey, Freedom fighter
- Prabhat Roy, Indian Filmmmker
- Mokksha, Indian Actress

== See also ==
- Barrackpore Cantonment
- North Barrackpore
- Barrackpore I CD Block
- Barrackpore II CD Block
- Barrackpore Mutiny of 1824
- Mangal Pandey#Indian Rebellion of 1857
- North 24 Parganas
