= Barrackpore Racecourse railway station =

Abandoned railway station in India

Barrackpore Racecourse
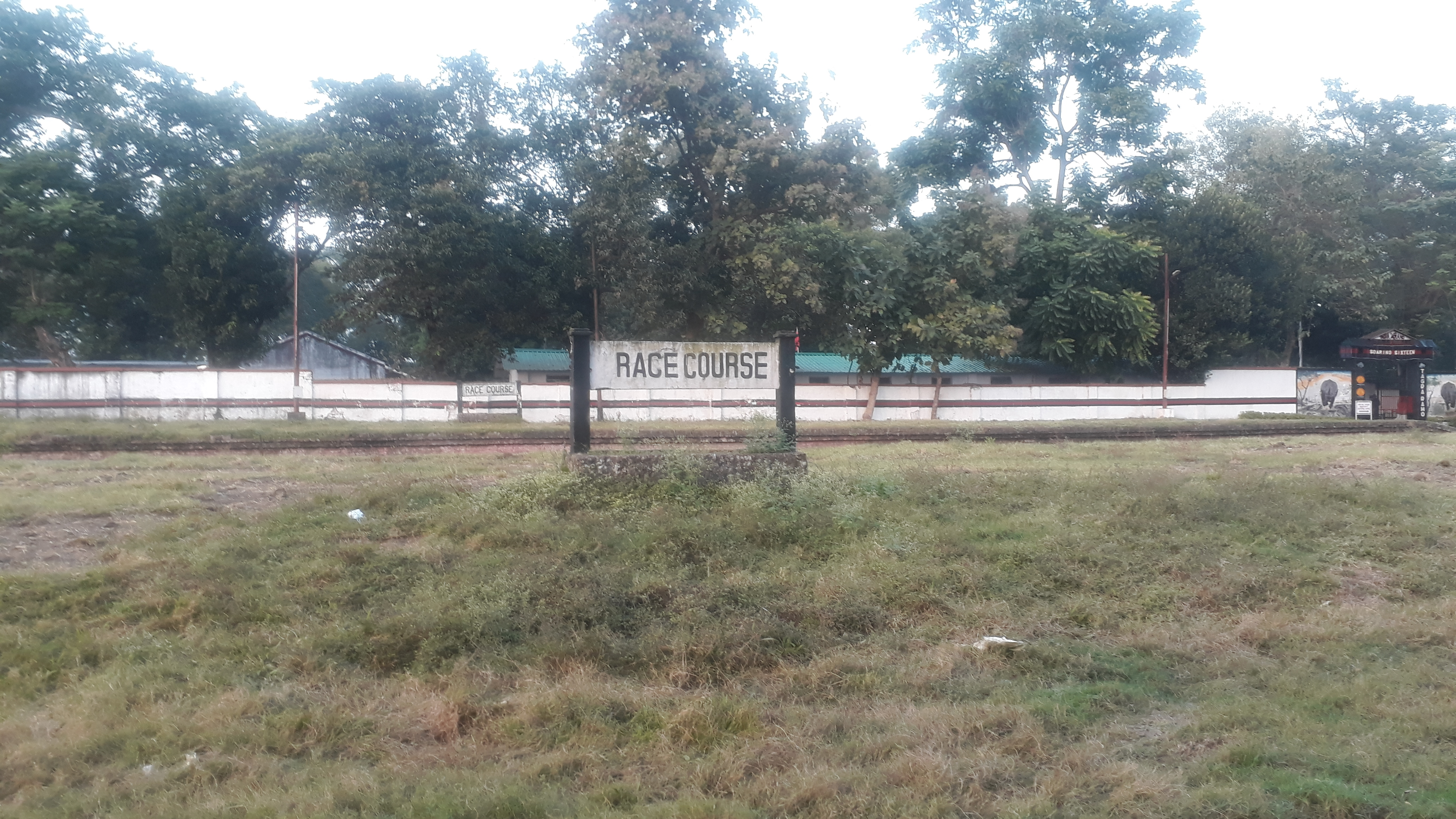

General information
- Location: Barrackpur Cantonment, Barrackpore, North 24 Parganas district, West Bengal; India
- Coordinates: 22°46′10″N 88°21′13″E
- System: Kolkata Suburban Railway
- Owner: Indian Railways
- Operator: Eastern Railway
- Line: Sealdah–Ranaghat line
- Platforms: 2
- Tracks: 3

Construction
- Structure type: For Military only
- Parking: Available

Other information
- Status: Non functioning
- Station code: BPPS
- Zone(s): Eastern Railway zone
- Division(s): Sealdah

History
- Opened: 1928; 98 years ago

Services
Preceding station	Kolkata Suburban Railway	Following station
Barrackpore towards Sealdah	Eastern Line Main line	Terminus
Route map
Location
- Location within West Bengal Location within India

Barrackpore Racecourse railway station is a railway station at Barrackpur Cantonment, Barrackpore in North 24 Parganas district in the Indian state of West Bengal. It is a part of the Kolkata Suburban Railway system and is under the jurisdiction of Eastern Railway. This railway station is presently abandoned and used by the Indian Army exclusively.

== History ==
The railway station was built on a branch line originating from Barrackpore railway station in 1928 that served the Barrackpore Cantonment area. Barrackpore had a race course established by Royal Calcutta Turf Club and a special single rail track took steam engine-driven trains there, carrying British passengers who would attend the race. The line has been depreciated since and this is used by the Indian Army only.

== Gallery ==
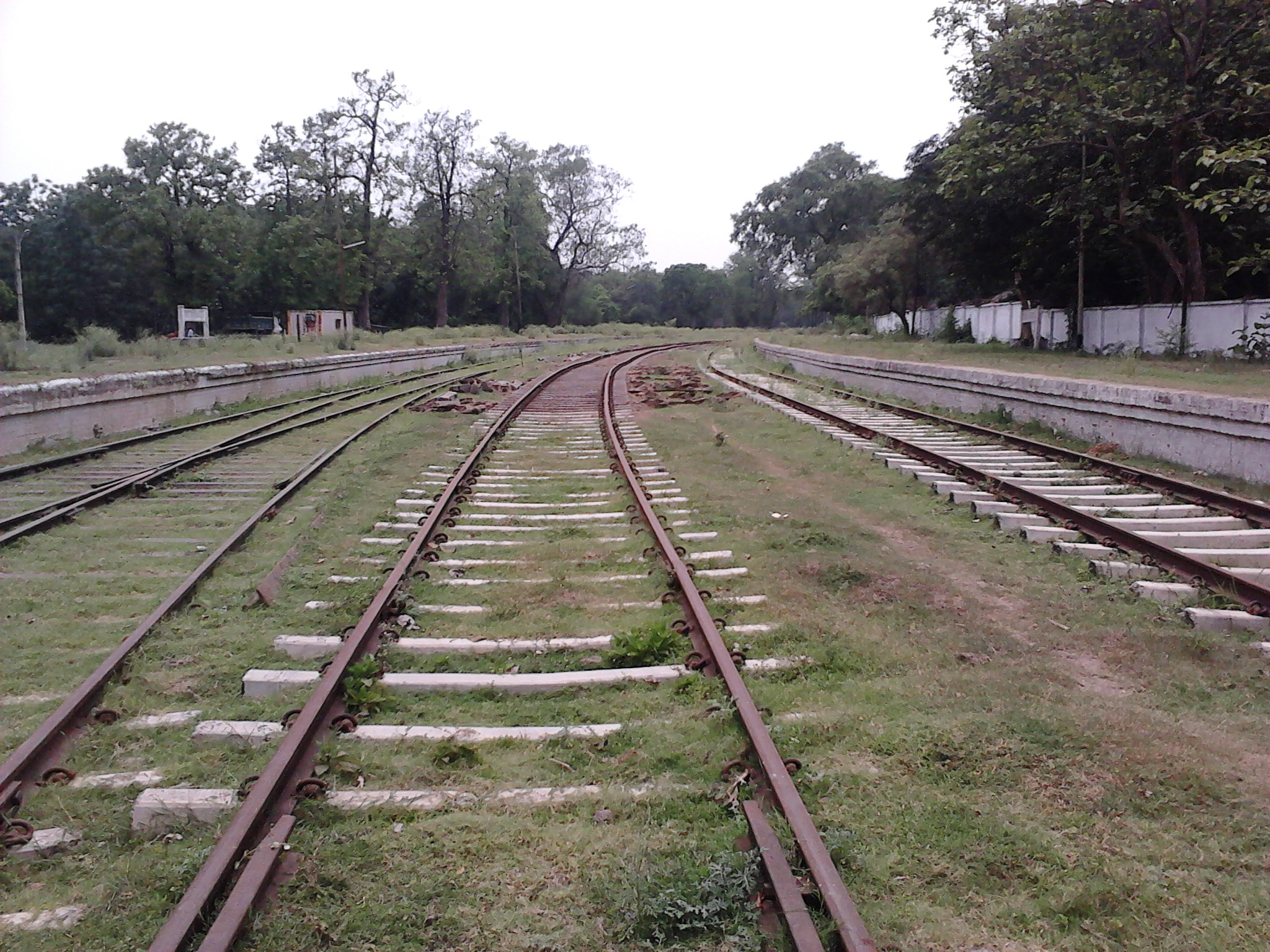
Barrackpore Racecourse railway station

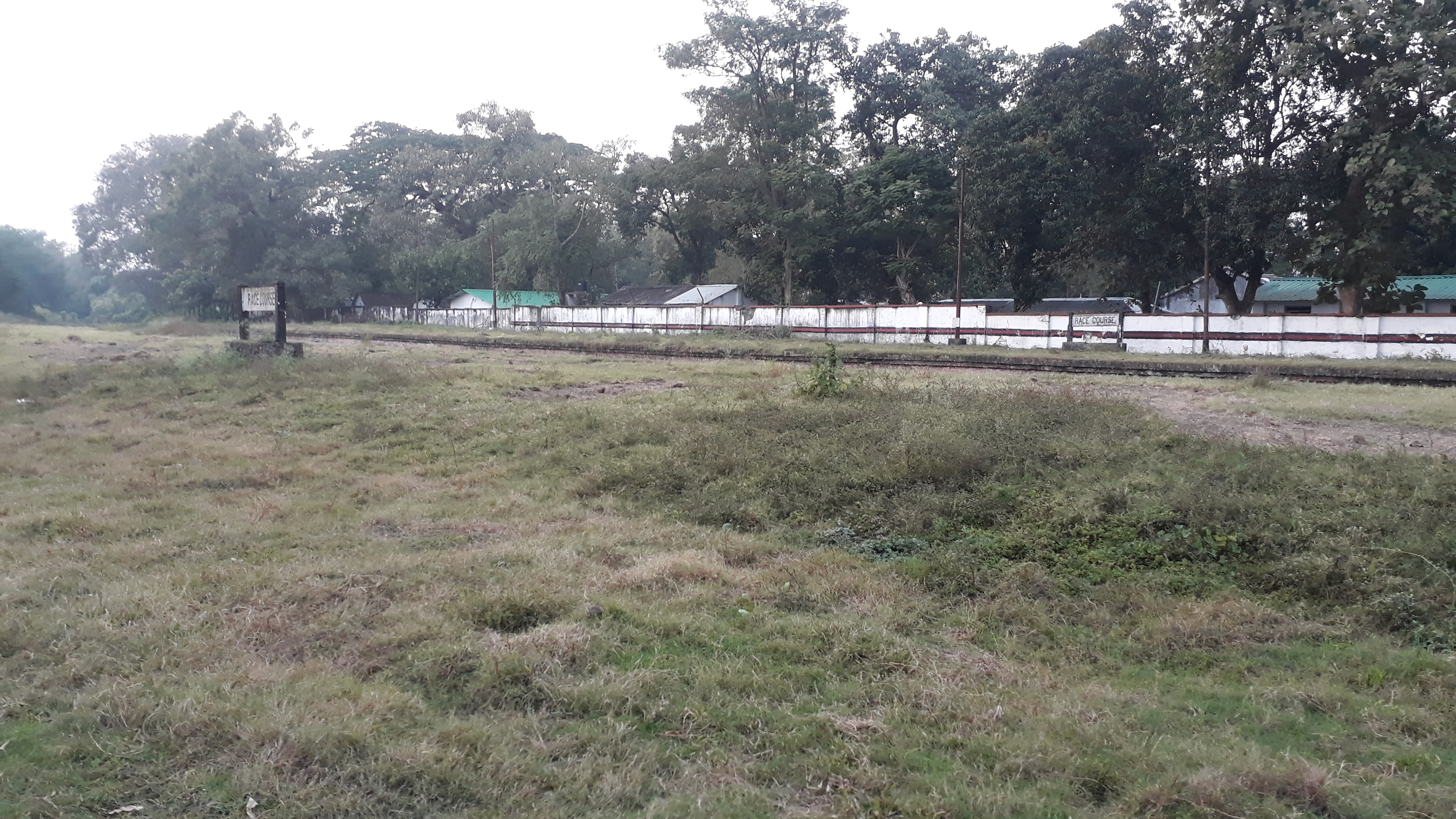
Barrackpore Racecourse railway station platform

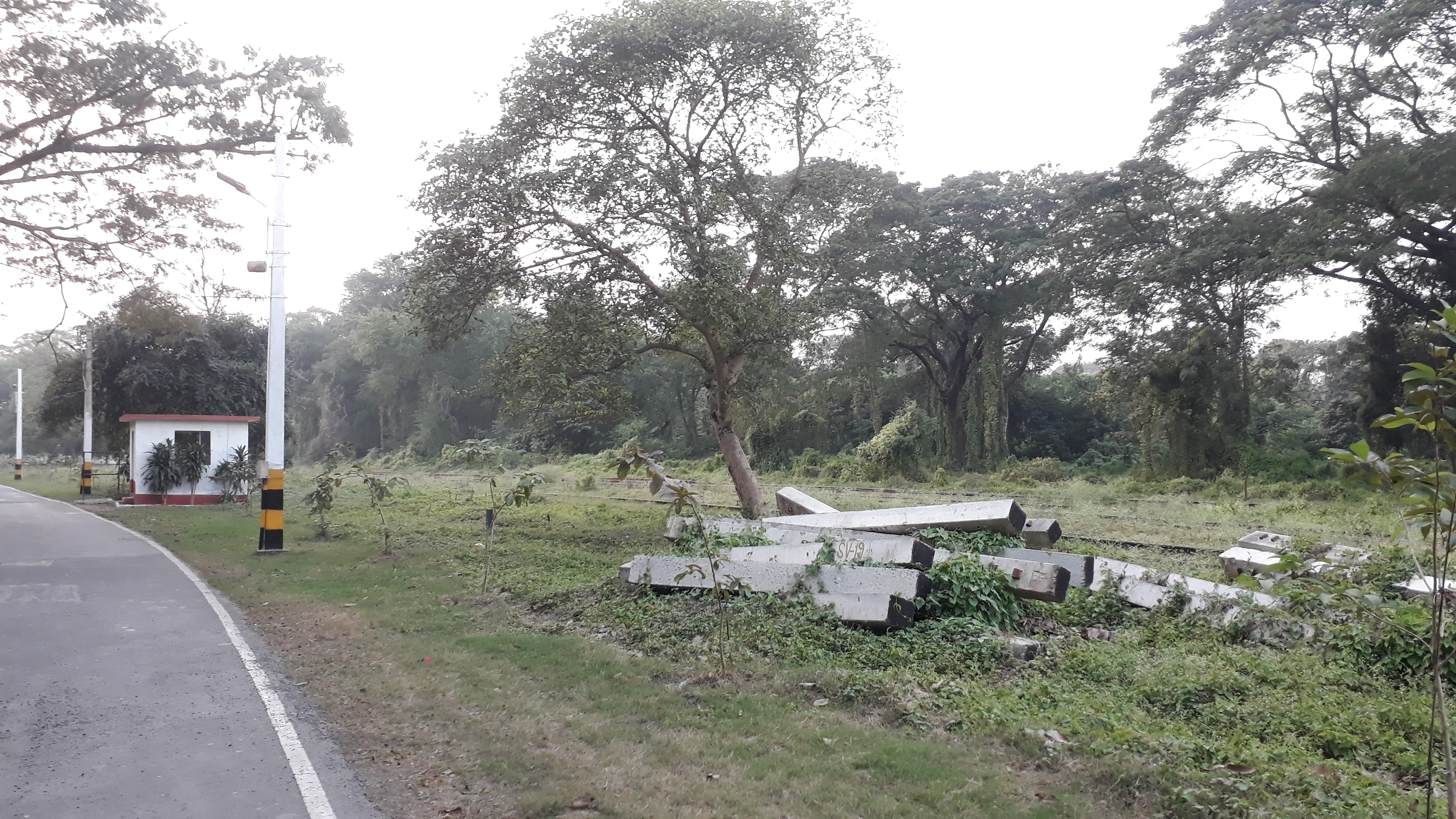
Cantonment road beside Barrackpore Racecourse railway station

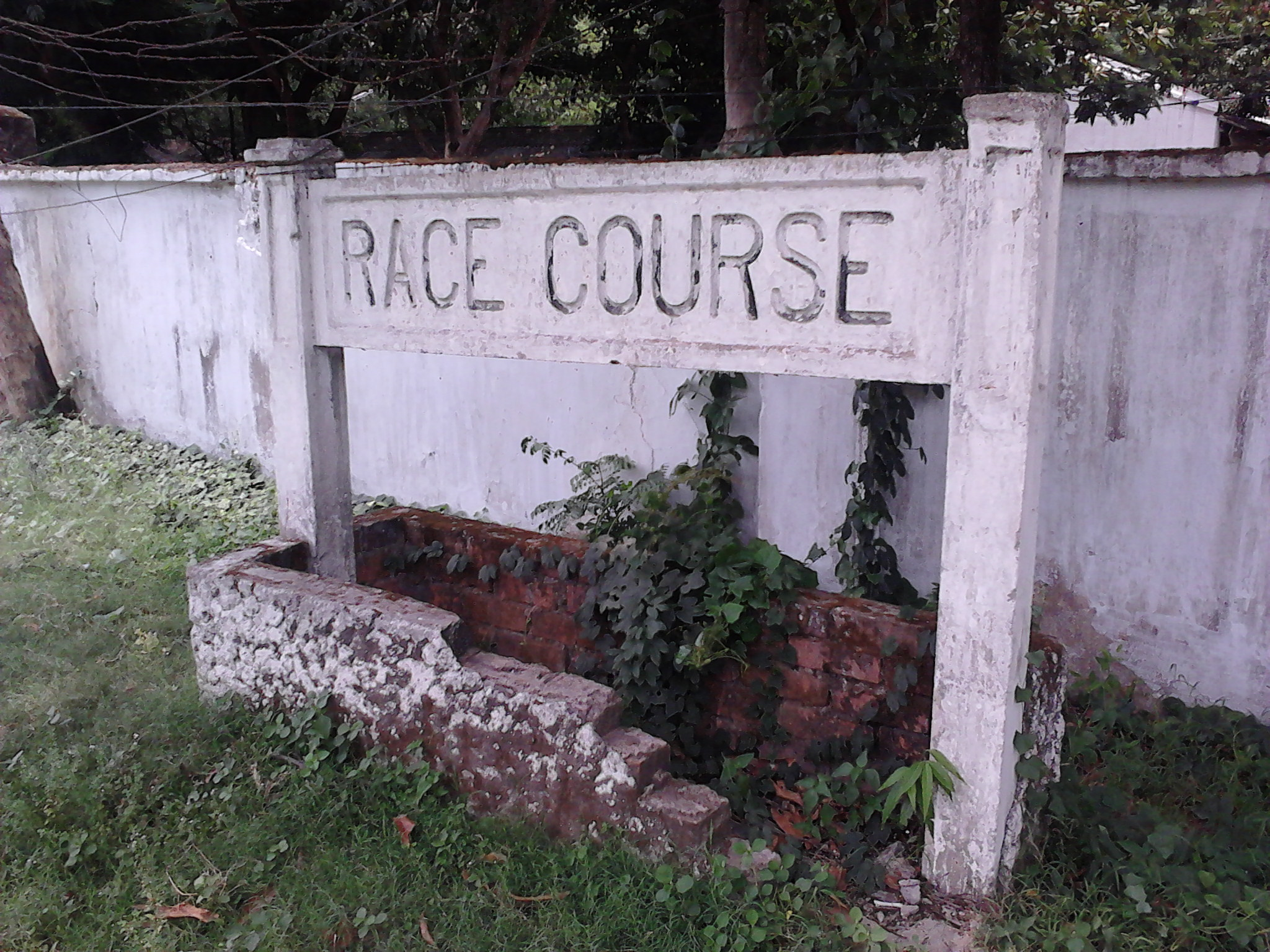
Barrackpore Racecourse railway station signage
