= Pradip Ghosh =

Bengali elocutionist (1942–2020)

- Born: 15 August 1942
- Died: 16 October 2020 (aged 78); Jodhpur Park, Kolkata, West Bengal, India
- Occupation: Administrator/ Elocutionist

Pradip Ghosh (Bengali: প্রদীপ ঘোষ) (15 August 1942 – 16 October 2020) was a Bengali elocutionist. His father, elocutionist Chinmoy Jeeban Ghosh (Bengali: চিন্ময় জীবন ঘোষ), introduced him to the art of recitation at the age of three. Ghosh was a pioneer, who made recitation widely accepted within the cultural milieu of Bengal during the 1960s.

== Profession ==
He worked as Joint Director in the Department of Information and Cultural Affairs of Government of West Bengal.

== Elocution ==
Elocution was a passion for Ghosh since his early years. He was one of the pioneers in popularizing elocution and recitation in Bengali. He had an acquaintance with Kazi Sabyasachi, son of Kazi Nazrul Islam, and many times they shared stage and performed elocution in cultural programs together. Pradip Ghosh will be remembered for his inimitable style of recitation. His recitations are available in innumerable albums in CDs and Cassettes. Recitation of কামাল পাশা (Kamal Pasha - a poem written by Kazi Nazrul Islam) and দেবতার গ্রাস (Debotar Gras - a poem written by Rabindranath Tagore) were amongst many of his notable creations. Ghosh's rendition of Tagore poems touched heart of millions. He was associated with many cultural organisations including Banichakra and Surbharati Sangeet Parishad.

== Awards ==
Ghosh was the recipient of Kazi Sabyasachi Award by Government of West Bengal in 2016.

== Autograph ==
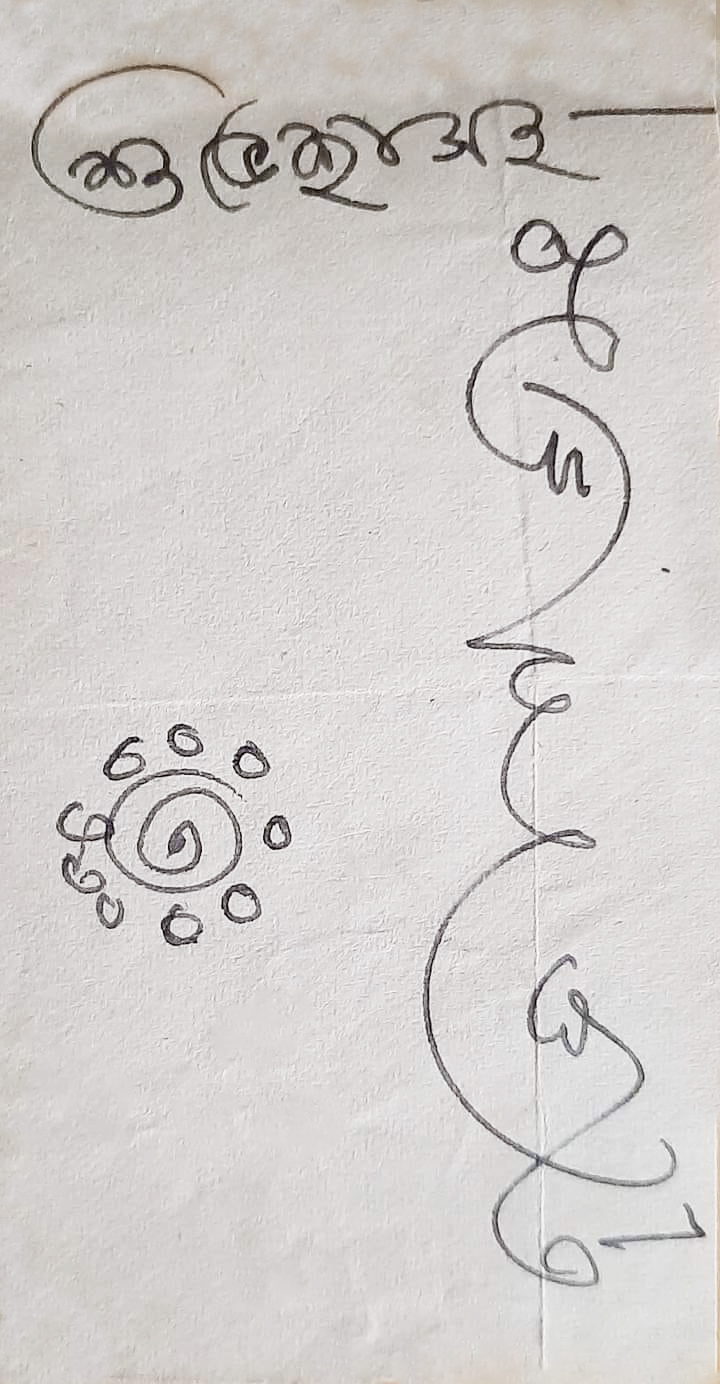
Autograph Pradip Ghosh

He was known to give autograph in an artistic manner.

== Death ==
On 16 October Ghosh died at 6.40 am in his residence at Jodhpur Park. He was suffering from fever. Blood report received after his death confirmed that he was COVID-19 positive. Survived by his daughter Pritha Ghosh, he left behind a legacy of elocution in Bengal through his disciples and students.
