= Agarpara =

- Neighbourhood
- Location in West Bengal, India Agarpara (India)
- Coordinates: 22.6837°N 88.3846°E
- Country: India
- State: West Bengal
- Division: Presidency
- District: North 24 Parganas

Government
  - Type: Municipality
  - Body: Panihati Municipality
- Elevation: 13 m (43 ft)

Languages
  - Official: Bengali, English
- Time zone: UTC+5:30 (IST)
- PIN: 700058, 700109
- Telephone code: +91 33
- Vehicle registration: WB
- Lok Sabha constituency: Dum Dum
- Vidhan Sabha constituency: Panihati

Agarpara is a neighbourhood in Panihati of North 24 Parganas district in the Indian state of West Bengal.It is a busy North Kolkata Sub-urban region.It is a part of the area covered by Kolkata Metropolitan Development Authority (KMDA).

== History ==
In the past, a community named Aghore, who were specialized in boat making, used to live here. Earlier this place was known as Agrapalli, from where the name has been changed into Aagarpara. Agarpara Union was officially established on 23 July 1867. Sen estate and Sen family had been the recorded oldest inhabitant of Agarpara. Also, Ghosh family of Tarapukur, Parbat family of East Station Road and Majumder family of North Station Road are the three oldest living families in this town.

== Geography ==
Cities and towns in the southern portion of Barrackpore subdivision in North 24 Parganas district
M: municipal city/ town, CT: census town,
N: neighbourhood/ administrative location
Owing to space constraints in the small map, the actual locations in a larger map may vary slightly

=== Location ===
96% of the population of Barrackpore subdivision (partly presented in the map alongside, all places marked in the map are linked in the full screen map) lives in urban areas. In 2011, it had a density of population of 10,967 per km^{2}. The subdivision has 16 municipalities and 24 census towns.

For most of the cities/ towns information regarding density of population is available in the Infobox. Population data is not available for neighbourhoods. It is available for the entire Municipal area and thereafter ward-wise.

=== Kolkata Urban Agglomeration ===
The following Municipalities, Census Towns and other locations in Barrackpore subdivision were part of Kolkata Urban Agglomeration in the 2011 census: Kanchrapara (M), Jetia (CT), Halisahar (M), Balibhara (CT), Naihati (M), Bhatpara (M), Kaugachhi (CT), Garshyamnagar (CT), Garulia (M), Ichhapur Defence Estate (CT), North Barrackpur (M), Barrackpur Cantonment (CB), Barrackpore (M), Jafarpur (CT), Ruiya (CT), Titagarh (M), Khardaha (M), Bandipur (CT), Panihati (M), Muragachha (CT) New Barrackpore (M), Chandpur (CT), Talbandha (CT), Patulia (CT), Kamarhati (M), Baranagar (M), South Dumdum (M), North Dumdum (M), Dum Dum (M), Noapara (CT), Babanpur (CT), Teghari (CT), Nanna (OG), Chakla (OG), Srotribati (OG) and Panpur (OG).

Agarpara is part of Panihati Municipality.

== Post Offices ==
Agarpara has two Postal Index Numbers (PINs).

1.Delivery Sub Post office with PIN 700109 in North Presidency Division of North 24 Parganas district in Calcutta Region.

2.Kamarhati Sub Post office with PIN 700058 in North Presidency Division of North 24 Parganas District in Calcutta Region.

== Economy ==
=== Industry ===
Agarpara is the part of the Barrackpore Industrial Region. Factories like Texmaco Rail & Engineering, Duckback, Priya Biscuits operate their units here. Also, the Tractor India Ltd., Himani, Aditya Shukla movie Production, National Tobacco Company and numerous jute and cotton mills establish Agarpara as an enriched industrial town.

== Transport ==
=== Rail ===
Agarpara railway station is one of the busiest Railway stations on the Sealdah division main section. One can reach Agarpara by local Train within 20 minutes from Sealdah railway station.

=== Commuters ===
Around a total of 32 lakh people from all around the city commute to Kolkata daily for work. In the Sealdah-Krishnanagar section there are 34 trains that carry commuters from 30 railway stations. In the Sealdah-Shantipur section 32 trains carry commuters from 29 stations.

=== Road and Ferry ===
There are frequent bus services which connect Agarpara to several neighbourhoods of Kolkata through Barrackpore Trunk Road (B.T. Road) :- 78 (Barrackpore Court to Esplanade), 78/1 (Rahara to Babughat), 81/1 (Barasat to Rajchandrapur), 214 (Sajirhat to Babughat), 214A (Sodepur Girja to Esplanade), 230 (Agarpara railway station to Alipore Zoo), C28 and S32 (Barrackpore Court to Howrah Station), S11 (Nilganj to Esplanade), E32 (Nilganj to Howrah Station) etc. Tentultala bus stop is on the crossing of North Station Road and B.T. Road. Also, the famous Nilgunj Road goes through this town.

The town is connected to the other side of the Hooghly River by regular ferry service.

=== Metro ===
Nearest metro station is Baranagar which is connected by frequent Bus and Auto services through B.T.Road and from Agarpara Railway Station.

== Education ==
Primary schools like Path Bhaban Shishu Shiksha Niketan, Vivekananda Vidyamandir, and BG Memorial school are doing really well in the last few years. Ushumpur Adarsha Uchcha Vidyalaya (Boys), Ushumpur Adarsha Uchcha Vidyalaya (Girls), Shri Saraswati Vidyalaya High School, Texmaco High School, Agarpara Mahajati Vidyapith, Savitri Mahajati Balika Vidyapith, Agarpara Netaji Shikshayatan (H.S.) (Boys), Agarpara Netaji Shikshayatan (H.S.) (Girls) are the popular high schools here, all affiliated to West Bengal Board. Narula Institute of Technology, a private engineering college, is situated in Agarpara. The college is affiliated to the West Bengal University of Technology (WBUT) and approved by AICTE. JIS University, a privately funded UGC recognised university is also situated in Agarpara. Ramakrishna Paramhansa University is a proposed private university set to be established in Agarpara.
