= Barrackpore (disambiguation) =

Barrackpore may refer to:

== Places ==
=== India ===
- Barrackpore, a city in North 24 Parganas district in the state of West Bengal; a satellite city of Kolkata
  - Barrackpore subdivision, an administrative division in North 24 Parganas district containing the city
    - Barrackpore I, a community development block in North 24 Parganas district
    - Barrackpore II, a community development block in North 24 Parganas district
    - Barrackpore (Lok Sabha constituency), a parliamentary constituency in North 24 Parganas district
    - Barrackpore (Vidhan Sabha constituency), an assembly constituency in North 24 Parganas district
  - Barrackpore mutiny of 1824
  - Barrackpore Air Force Station
  - Barrackpur Cantonment
  - Barrackpore Police Commissionerate
  - Barrackpore railway station
  - Barrackpore Trunk Road
- North Barrackpur, a city in West Bengal, India
- New Barrackpore, a city in West Bengal, India

=== Trinidad and Tobago ===
- Barrackpore, Trinidad and Tobago
