= Nanna, North 24 Parganas =

Nanna
- Outgrowth
- Location in West Bengal, India Nanna (India)
- Coordinates: 22.91806°N 88.438462°E
- Country: India
- State: West Bengal
- District: North 24 Parganas

Population (2011)
  - Total: 3,464

Languages
  - Official: Bengali, English
- Time zone: UTC+5:30 (IST)
- Lok Sabha constituency: Barrackpore
- Vidhan Sabha constituency: Naihati
- Website: north24parganas.nic.in

Nanna is an outgrowth of Kanchrapara in Barrackpore I CD Block in Barrackpore subdivision of North 24 Parganas district in the state of West Bengal, India.

== Geography ==
=== Location ===
Nanna is an outgrowth of Kanchrapara and is part of Ward 27.

Jetia, Nanna and Chakla (OG) form an urban cluster south of Kanchrapara.

=== Police station ===
Bizpur police station under Barrackpore Police Commissionerate has jurisdiction over Naihati municipal area and Barrackpore I CD Block, including Barrackpur Cantonment Board.

== Demographics ==
=== Population ===
At the 2011 Census of India, Nanna had a population of 3,464 (1,738 (50.2%) males and 1,726 (49.8%) females). The population below 6 years was 220. The number of literates in Nanna was 3,127 (96.39% of the population over 6 years).

=== Kolkata Urban Agglomeration ===
The following municipalities, census towns and other locations in Barrackpore subdivision were part of Kolkata Urban Agglomeration in the 2011 census: Kanchrapara (M), Jetia (CT), Halisahar (M), Balibhara (CT), Naihati (M), Bhatpara (M), Kaugachhi (CT), Garshyamnagar (CT), Garulia (M), Ichhapur Defence Estate (CT), North Barrackpur (M), Barrackpur Cantonment (CB), Barrackpore (M), Jafarpur (CT), Ruiya (CT), Titagarh (M), Khardaha (M), Bandipur (CT), Panihati (M), Muragachha (CT) New Barrackpore (M), Chandpur (CT), Talbandha (CT), Patulia (CT), Kamarhati (M), Baranagar (M), South Dumdum (M), North Dumdum (M), Dum Dum (M), Noapara (CT), Babanpur (CT), Teghari (CT), Nanna (OG), Chakla (OG), Srotribati (OG) and Panpur (OG).

== Transport ==
A short stretch of Malancha Road links Nanna to Kalyani Expressway. Halisahar railway station is located nearby.

== Healthcare ==
Nanna Rural Hospital, with 30 beds, is the main medical facility in Barrackpore I CD Block. Narayanpur primary health centre at Kankinara has 6 beds.
