= Panpur =

- Outgrowth
- Location in West Bengal, India Panpur (India)
- Coordinates: 22.8602°N 88.4293°E
- Country: India
- State: West Bengal
- District: North 24 Parganas

Population (2011)
  - Total: 2,257

Languages
  - Official: Bengali, English
- Time zone: UTC+5:30 (IST)
- Telephone/STD code: 033
- Lok Sabha constituency: Barrackpore
- Vidhan Sabha constituency: Bhatpara
- Website: north24parganas.nic.in

Panpur is an outgrowth of Bhatpara in Barrackpore I CD Block in Barrackpore subdivision of North 24 Parganas district in the state of West Bengal, India.

== Geography ==
Cities and towns in the northern portion of Barrackpore subdivision in North 24 Parganas district
M: municipal city/ town, CT: census town,
N: neighbourhood, OG: outgrowth
Owing to space constraints in the small map, the actual locations in a larger map may vary slightly

=== Location ===
96% of the population of Barrackpore subdivision (partly presented in the map alongside) live in urban areas. In 2011, it had a density of population of 10,967 per km^{2} The subdivision has 16 municipalities and 24 census towns.

For most of the cities/ towns information regarding density of population is available in the Infobox. Population data is not available for neighbourhoods. It is available for the entire municipal area and thereafter ward-wise.

All places marked on the map are linked in the full-screen map.

=== Police station ===
Naihati police station under Barrackpore Police Commissionerate has jurisdiction over Naihati municipal area and Barrackpore I CD Block, including Barrackpur Cantonment Board.

=== CD Block HQ ===
The headquarters of Barrackpore I CD Block is at Panpur.

== Demographics ==
=== Population ===
As per the 2011 Census of India, Panpur had a total population of 2,257, of which 1,123 (50%) were males and 1,134 (50%) were females. Population below 6 years was 179. The total number of literates in Panpur was 1,908 (91.82% of the population over 6 years).

=== Kolkata Urban Agglomeration ===
The following Municipalities, Census Towns and other locations in Barrackpore subdivision were part of Kolkata Urban Agglomeration in the 2011 census: Kanchrapara (M), Jetia (CT), Halisahar (M), Balibhara (CT), Naihati (M), Bhatpara (M), Kaugachhi (CT), Garshyamnagar (CT), Garulia (M), Ichhapur Defence Estate (CT), North Barrackpur (M), Barrackpur Cantonment (CB), Barrackpore (M), Jafarpur (CT), Ruiya (CT), Titagarh (M), Khardaha (M), Bandipur (CT), Panihati (M), Muragachha (CT) New Barrackpore (M), Chandpur (CT), Talbandha (CT), Patulia (CT), Kamarhati (M), Baranagar (M), South Dumdum (M), North Dumdum (M), Dum Dum (M), Noapara (CT), Babanpur (CT), Teghari (CT), Nanna (OG), Chakla (OG), Srotribati (OG) and Panpur (OG).

== Transport ==
Panpur is beside Kalyani Expressway.

Kankinara railway station on the Sealdah-Ranaghat line is located nearby.
