= Jafarpur =

- Census Town
- Location in West Bengal, India Jafarpur (India)
- Coordinates: 22.782°N 88.386°E
- Country: India
- State: West Bengal
- District: North 24 Parganas

Area
  - Total: 1.98 km^{2} (0.76 sq mi)
- Elevation: 2 m (6.6 ft)

Population (2011)
  - Total: 19,062
  - Density: 9,630/km^{2} (24,900/sq mi)

Languages
  - Official: Bengali, English
- Time zone: UTC+5:30 (IST)
- PIN: 700122
- Telephone code: +91 33
- ISO 3166 code: IN-WB
- Vehicle registration: WB
- Lok Sabha constituency: Barrackpore
- Vidhan Sabha constituency: Noapara
- Website: north24parganas.nic.in

Jafarpur is a census town in Barrackpore II CD Block in Barrackpore subdivision in North 24 Parganas district in the Indian state of West Bengal.

== Geography ==
Cities and towns in the northern portion of Barrackpore subdivision in North 24 Parganas district
M: municipal city/ town, CT: census town,
N: neighbourhood, OG: outgrowth
Owing to space constraints in the small map, the actual locations in a larger map may vary slightly

=== Location ===
Jafarpur is located at 22.32°N 88.23°E. It has an average elevation of 2 metres (7 feet).

Babanpur, Jafarpur, Mohanpur and Telenipara form a cluster of census towns around Barrackpore.

96% of the population of Barrackpore subdivision (partly presented in the map alongside) live in urban areas. In 2011, it had a density of population of 10,967 per km^{2}. The subdivision has 16 municipalities and 24 census towns.

For most of the cities/ towns information regarding density of population is available in the Infobox. Population data is not available for neighbourhoods. It is available for the entire Municipal area and thereafter ward-wise.

All places marked on the map are linked in the full-screen map.

=== Police station ===
Khardaha & Titagarh police station under Barrackpore Police Commissionerate has jurisdiction over Khardaha Municipal area and Barrackpore II CD Block.

=== Post Office ===
Jaffarpur has a non-delivery sub post office, with PIN 700122 in the North Presidency Division of North 24 Parganas district in Calcutta region. Other post offices with the same PIN are Nonachandanpukur and Anandapuri.

== Demographics ==
=== Population ===
As per 2011 Census of India Jafarpur had a total population of 19,062, of which 9,724 (51%) were males and 9,338 (49%) were females. Population below 6 years was 1,361. The total number of literates in Jaffarpur was 16,598 (93.77% of the population over 6 years).

As of 2001 India census, Jafarpur had a population of 14,032. Males constitute 53% of the population and females 47%. Jafarpur has an average literacy rate of 86%, higher than the national average of 59.5%: male literacy is 89% and female literacy is 83%. In Jafarpur, 7% of the population is under 6 years of age.

=== Kolkata Urban Agglomeration ===
The following Municipalities, Census Towns and other locations in Barrackpore subdivision were part of Kolkata Urban Agglomeration in the 2011 census: Kanchrapara (M), Jetia (CT), Halisahar (M), Balibhara (CT), Naihati (M), Bhatpara (M), Kaugachhi (CT), Garshyamnagar (CT), Garulia (M), Ichhapur Defence Estate (CT), North Barrackpur (M), Barrackpur Cantonment (CB), Barrackpore (M), Jafarpur (CT), Ruiya (CT), Titagarh (M), Khardaha (M), Bandipur (CT), Panihati (M), Muragachha (CT) New Barrackpore (M), Chandpur (CT), Talbandha (CT), Patulia (CT), Kamarhati (M), Baranagar (M), South Dumdum (M), North Dumdum (M), Dum Dum (M), Noapara (CT), Babanpur (CT), Teghari (CT), Nanna (OG), Chakla (OG), Srotribati (OG) and Panpur (OG).

== Infrastructure ==
As per the District Census Handbook 2011, Jafarpur covered an area of 1.98 km^{2}. Amongst the medical facilities it had were 7 medicine shops, Amongst the educational facilities it had were 8 primary schools, 3 middle schools, 3 secondary schools and 1 senior secondary school.

== Transport ==
Jafarpur is on Kalyani Expressway.

The Palta railway station on the Sealdah-Ranaghat line is located nearby.

== Education ==
Jaffarpur Charaktala Girls’ High School has facilities for teaching up to Class X. It was established in 1959.

== Healthcare ==
North 24 Parganas district has been identified as one of the areas where ground water is affected by arsenic contamination.
