= Ruiya =

- Census Town
- Location in West Bengal, India Ruiya (India)
- Coordinates: 22.74777°N 88.40862°E
- Country: India
- State: West Bengal
- District: North 24 Parganas

Area
  - Total: 1.98 km^{2} (0.76 sq mi)

Population (2011)
  - Total: 17,661
  - Density: 8,920/km^{2} (23,100/sq mi)

Languages
  - Official: Bengali, English
- Time zone: UTC+5:30 (IST)
- PIN: 700119
- Telephone code: +91 33
- ISO 3166 code: IN-WB
- Vehicle registration: WB
- Lok Sabha constituency: Dum Dum
- Vidhan Sabha constituency: Khardaha
- Website: north24parganas.nic.in

Ruiya is a census town in Barrackpore II CD Block in Barrackpore subdivision in North 24 Parganas district in the Indian state of West Bengal.

== Geography ==
Cities and towns in the southern portion of Barrackpore subdivision in North 24 Parganas district
M: municipal city/ town, CT: census town,
N: neighbourhood/ administrative location
Owing to space constraints in the small map, the actual locations in a larger map may vary slightly

=== Location ===
Ruiya is located at 22°44′30″N 88°23′59″E.

Chak Kanthalia, Ruiya, Patulia and Bandipur form a cluster of census towns around Titagarh/ Khardaha. Karna Madhabpur, with the CD Block headquarters, is also located nearby.

96% of the population of Barrackpore subdivision (partly presented in the map alongside, all places marked in the map are linked in the full screen version) lives in urban areas. In 2011, it had a density of population of 10,967 per km^{2}. The subdivision has 16 municipalities and 24 census towns.

For most of the cities/ towns information regarding density of population is available in the Infobox. Population data is not available for neighbourhoods. It is available for the entire Municipal area and thereafter ward-wise.

=== Police station ===
Khardaha police station under Barrackpore Police Commissionerate has jurisdiction over Khardaha Municipal area and Barrackpore II CD Block.

== Demographics ==
=== Population ===
As per 2011 Census of India Ruiya had a total population of 17,661, of which 9,149 (52%) were males and 8,512 (48%) were females. Population below 6 years was 1,963. The total number of literates in Ruiya was 12,010 (76.51% of the population over 6 years).

As of 2001 India census, Ruiya had a population of 10,703. Males constitute 52% of the population and females 48%. Ruiya has an average literacy rate of 65%, higher than the national average of 59.5%: male literacy is 71% and female literacy is 58%. In Ruiya, 12% of the population is under 6 years of age.

=== Kolkata Urban Agglomeration ===
The following Municipalities, Census Towns and other locations in Barrackpore subdivision were part of Kolkata Urban Agglomeration in the 2011 census: Kanchrapara (M), Jetia (CT), Halisahar (M), Balibhara (CT), Naihati (M), Bhatpara (M), Kaugachhi (CT), Garshyamnagar (CT), Garulia (M), Ichhapur Defence Estate (CT), North Barrackpur (M), Barrackpur Cantonment (CB), Barrackpore (M), Jafarpur (CT), Ruiya (CT), Titagarh (M), Khardaha (M), Bandipur (CT), Panihati (M), Muragachha (CT) New Barrackpore (M), Chandpur (CT), Talbandha (CT), Patulia (CT), Kamarhati (M), Baranagar (M), South Dumdum (M), North Dumdum (M), Dum Dum (M), Noapara (CT), Babanpur (CT), Teghari (CT), Nanna (OG), Chakla (OG), Srotribati (OG) and Panpur (OG).

== Infrastructure ==
As per the District Census Handbook 2011, Ruiya covered an area of 1.98 km^{2}. Amongst the medical facilities it had were 10 medicine shops. Amongst the educational facilities it had were 3 primary schools, and the nearest middle, secondary and senior secondary schools were available 2.5 km away at Barrackpore.

== Transport ==
Kalyani Expressway runs through Ruiya.

=== Bus ===
==== Private Bus ====
- 56 Ruiya Purbapara - Howrah Station

==== WBTC Bus ====
- AC10 Nilganj - Howrah Station

=== Train ===
Titagarh railway station and Barrackpore railway station on the Sealdah-Ranaghat line are located nearby.

== Healthcare ==
Block Primary Health Centre at Bandipur and B N Bose Sub Divisional Hospital Talpukur are located nearby.

North 24 Parganas district has been identified as one of the areas where ground water is affected by arsenic contamination.
