= Balibhara =

- Census Town
- Location in West Bengal, India Balibhara (India)
- Coordinates: 22.917981°N 88.422007°E
- Country: India
- State: West Bengal
- District: North 24 Parganas

Area
  - Total: 1.82 km^{2} (0.70 sq mi)

Population (2011)
  - Total: 8,521
  - Density: 4,680/km^{2} (12,100/sq mi)

Languages
  - Official: Bengali, English
- Time zone: UTC+5:30 (IST)
- Telephone code: +91 33
- Vehicle registration: WB
- Lok Sabha constituency: Barrackpore
- Vidhan Sabha constituency: Naihati
- Website: north24parganas.nic.in

Balibhara is a census town in Barrackpore I CD Block of Barrackpore subdivision in North 24 Parganas district in the Indian state of West Bengal.

== Demographics ==
=== Population ===
As of 2011 India census, Balibhara had a population of 8,521; of this, 4,376 are male, 4,145 female. It has an average literacy rate of 79.79%, higher than the national average of 74.04%.

=== Kolkata Urban Agglomeration ===
The following municipalities, census towns and other locations in Barrackpore subdivision were part of Kolkata Urban Agglomeration in the 2011 census: Kanchrapara (M), Jetia (CT), Halisahar (M), Balibhara (CT), Naihati (M), Bhatpara (M), Kaugachhi (CT), Garshyamnagar (CT), Garulia (M), Ichhapur Defence Estate (CT), North Barrackpur (M), Barrackpur Cantonment (CB), Barrackpore (M), Jafarpur (CT), Ruiya (CT), Titagarh (M), Khardaha (M), Bandipur (CT), Panihati (M), Muragachha (CT), New Barrackpore (M), Chandpur (CT), Talbandha (CT), Patulia (CT), Kamarhati (M), Baranagar (M), South Dumdum (M), North Dumdum (M), Dum Dum (M), Noapara (CT), Babanpur (CT), Teghari (CT), Nanna (OG), Chakla (OG), Srotribati (OG) and Panpur (OG).

== Geography ==
Cities and towns in the northern portion of Barrackpore subdivision in North 24 Parganas district
M: municipal city/ town, CT: census town,
N: neighbourhood, OG: outgrowth
Owing to space constraints in the small map, the actual locations in a larger map may vary slightly

=== Location ===
Balibhara is located at 22.917981°N 88.422007°E

96% of the population of Barrackpore subdivision (partly presented in the map alongside) live in urban areas. In 2011, it had a density of population of 10,967 per km^{2}. The subdivision has 16 municipalities and 24 census towns.

For most of the cities/ towns information regarding density of population is available in the Infobox. Population data is not available for neighbourhoods. It is available for the entire municipal area and thereafter ward-wise.

All places marked on the map are linked in the full-screen map.

=== Police station ===
Naihati police station under Barrackpore Police Commissionerate has jurisdiction over Naihati municipal area and Barrackpore I CD Block, including Barrackpur Cantonment Board.

== Healthcare ==
North 24 Parganas district has been identified as one of the areas where ground water is affected by arsenic contamination.

== Infrastructure ==
As per the District Census Handbook 2011, Balibhara covered an area of 1.82 km^{2}. It had 3 primary schools, 2 middle schools and 2 secondary schools. The nearest senior secondary school was available 3 km away at Naihati.

== Transport ==
Local roads link Balibhara to Kalyani Expressway and State Highway 1.

The nearest railway stations are Halisahar railway station on the Sealdah-Ranaghat line and Garifa railway station on the Naihati-Bandel link.
