= Kaugachhi =

- Census Town
- Location in West Bengal, India Kaugachhi (India)
- Coordinates: 22.8123°N 88.3903°E
- Country: India
- State: West Bengal
- District: North 24 Parganas

Area
  - Total: 1.83 km^{2} (0.71 sq mi)

Population (2011)
  - Total: 17,001
  - Density: 9,290/km^{2} (24,100/sq mi)

Languages
  - Official: Bengali, English
- Time zone: UTC+5:30 (IST)
- Telephone code: +91 33
- ISO 3166 code: IN-WB
- Vehicle registration: WB
- Lok Sabha constituency: Barrackpore
- Vidhan Sabha constituency: Noapara
- Website: north24parganas.nic.in

Kaugachhi is a census town in Barrackpore I CD Block in Barrackpore subdivision in North 24 Parganas district in the Indian state of West Bengal.

== Demographics ==
=== Population ===
As per 2011 Census of India Kaugachhi had a total population of 17,001, of which 8,612 (51%) were males and 8,389 (49%) were females. Population below 6 years was 1,379. The total number of literates in Kaugachhi was 13,833 (88.55% of the population over 6 years).

As of 2001 India census, Kaugachhi had a population of 13,904. Males constitute 51% of the population and females 49%. Kaugachhi has an average literacy rate of 72%, higher than the national average of 59.5%: male literacy is 76%, and female literacy is 67%. In Kaugachhi, 10% of the population is under 6 years of age.

=== Kolkata Urban Agglomeration ===
The following Municipalities, Census Towns and other locations in Barrackpore subdivision were part of Kolkata Urban Agglomeration in the 2011 census: Kanchrapara (M), Jetia (CT), Halisahar (M), Balibhara (CT), Naihati (M), Bhatpara (M), Kaugachhi (CT), Garshyamnagar (CT), Garulia (M), Ichhapur Defence Estate (CT), North Barrackpur (M), Barrackpur Cantonment (CB), Barrackpore (M), Jafarpur (CT), Ruiya (CT), Titagarh (M), Khardaha (M), Bandipur (CT), Panihati (M), Muragachha (CT) New Barrackpore (M), Chandpur (CT), Talbandha (CT), Patulia (CT), Kamarhati (M), Baranagar (M), South Dumdum (M), North Dumdum (M), Dum Dum (M), Noapara (CT), Babanpur (CT), Teghari (CT), Nanna (OG), Chakla (OG), Srotribati (OG) and Panpur (OG).

== Geography ==
Cities and towns in the northern portion of Barrackpore subdivision in North 24 Parganas district
M: municipal city/ town, CT: census town,
N: neighbourhood, OG: outgrowth
Owing to space constraints in the small map, the actual locations in a larger map may vary slightly

=== Location ===
Garshyamnagar, Noapara, Kaugachhi and Paltapara form an urban cluster east of Garulia and North Barrackpur. Ichhapur Defence Estate lies on the west of North Barrackpur.

96% of the population of Barrackpore subdivision (partly presented in the map alongside) live in urban areas. In 2011, it had a density of population of 10,967 per km^{2} The subdivision has 16 municipalities and 24 census towns.

For most of the cities/ towns information regarding density of population is available in the Infobox. Population data is not available for neighbourhoods. It is available for the entire municipal area and thereafter ward-wise.

All places marked on the map are linked in the full-screen map.

=== Police station ===
Noapara police station under Barrackpore Police Commissionerate has jurisdiction over Garulia and North Barrackpur municipal areas.

=== Post Office ===
Kowgachi has a non-delivery sub post office, with PIN 743127 in the North Presidency Division of North 24 Parganas district in Calcutta region. Other post offices with the same PIN are Paltapara, Shyamnagar, Mulajore, Feeder Road, Gurdah, Mondalpara and Purbabidhyadharpur.

== Healthcare ==
North 24 Parganas district has been identified as one of the areas where ground water is affected by arsenic contamination.

== Infrastructure ==
As per the District Census Handbook 2011, Kaugachhi covered an area of 1.83 km^{2}. Amongst the medical facilities it had were 4 medicine shops. Amongst the educational facilities it had were 5 primary schools. The nearest other school facilities were available 2 km away at Gurdaha or 13 km away at Naihati.

== Transport ==
Kaugachhi is beside Kalyani Expressway.

The nearest railway stations are Shyamnagar railway station and Ichhapur railway station on the Sealdah-Ranaghat line.
