= Chandpur, Ghola =

Chandpur
- Census Town
- Location in West Bengal, India Chandpur (India)
- Coordinates: 22.687019°N 88.426832°E
- Country: India
- State: West Bengal
- District: North 24 Parganas

Area
  - Total: 0.62 km^{2} (0.24 sq mi)
- Elevation: 6 m (20 ft)

Population (2011)
  - Total: 10,930
  - Density: 18,000/km^{2} (46,000/sq mi)

Languages
  - Official: Bengali, English
- Time zone: UTC+5:30 (IST)
- PIN: 700110
- ISO 3166 code: IN-WB
- Vehicle registration: WB
- Lok Sabha constituency: Dum Dum
- Vidhan Sabha constituency: Khardaha
- Website: north24parganas.nic.in

Chandpur is a census town in Barrackpore II CD Block in Barrackpore subdivision in North 24 Parganas district in the state of West Bengal, India.

== Geography ==
Cities and towns in the southern portion of Barrackpore subdivision in North 24 Parganas district
M: municipal city/ town, CT: census town,
N: neighbourhood/ administrative location
Owing to space constraints in the small map, the actual locations in a larger map may vary slightly

=== Location ===
Chandpur is located at 22°40′48″N 88°26′38″E.

Muragachha, Talbandha, Chandpur and Teghari form a cluster of census towns around/ near the Sodepur-Barasat Road, between Panihati and New Barrackpur.

96% of the population of Barrackpore subdivision (partly presented in the map alongside, all places marked in the map are linked in the full screen map) lives in urban areas. In 2011, it had a density of population of 10,967 per km^{2}. The subdivision has 16 municipalities and 24 census towns.

For most of the cities/ towns information regarding density of population is available in the Infobox. Population data is not available for neighbourhoods. It is available for the entire Municipal area and thereafter ward-wise.

=== Police station ===
Khardaha police station under Barrackpore Police Commissionerate has jurisdiction over Khardaha Municipal area and Barrackpore II CD Block.

== Demographics ==
=== Population ===
As per 2011 Census of India Chandpur had a total population of 10,930, of which 5,593 (51%) were males and 5,337 (49%) were females. Population below 6 years was 1,100. The total number of literates in Chandpur was 8,232 (83.74% of the population over 6 years).

As of 2001 India census, Chandpur had a population of 8843. Males constitute 51% of the population and females 49%. Chandpur has an average literacy rate of 68%, higher than the national average of 59.5%; with male literacy of 74% and female literacy of 61%. 12% of the population is under 6 years of age.

=== Kolkata Urban Agglomeration ===
The following Municipalities, Census Towns and other locations in Barrackpore subdivision were part of Kolkata Urban Agglomeration in the 2011 census: Kanchrapara (M), Jetia (CT), Halisahar (M), Balibhara (CT), Naihati (M), Bhatpara (M), Kaugachhi (CT), Garshyamnagar (CT), Garulia (M), Ichhapur Defence Estate (CT), North Barrackpur (M), Barrackpur Cantonment (CB), Barrackpore (M), Jafarpur (CT), Ruiya (CT), Titagarh (M), Khardaha (M), Bandipur (CT), Panihati (M), Muragachha (CT) New Barrackpore (M), Chandpur (CT), Talbandha (CT), Patulia (CT), Kamarhati (M), Baranagar (M), South Dumdum (M), North Dumdum (M), Dum Dum (M), Noapara (CT), Babanpur (CT), Teghari (CT), Nanna (OG), Chakla (OG), Srotribati (OG) and Panpur (OG).

== Infrastructure ==
As per the District Census Handbook 2011, Chandpur covered an area of 0.62 km^{2}. Amongst the medical facilities it had were a dispensary/ health centre, a mobile clinic and a veterinary hospital. Amongst the educational facilities It had were 3 primary schools, a middle school, a secondary school and a senior secondary school.

== Transport ==
Chandpur is a little away from both Kalyani Expressway and Sodepur-Barasat Road and local roads link Chandpur to these roads.

The nearest railway stations are Madhyamgram railway station on the Sealdah-Bangaon line and Sodepur railway station on the Sealdah-Ranaghat line.

== Healthcare ==
North 24 Parganas district has been identified as one of the areas where ground water is affected by arsenic contamination.
