= Barrackpore I =

- Community development block
- Interactive map of Barrackpore I
- Coordinates: 22.909981°N 88.446007°E
- Country: India
- State: West Bengal
- District: North 24 Parganas

Government
  - Type: Representative democracy

Area
  - Total: 95.44 km^{2} (36.85 sq mi)

Population (2011)
  - Total: 194,333
  - Density: 2,036/km^{2} (5,274/sq mi)

Languages
  - Official: Bengali, English

Literacy (2011)
  - Total literates: 151,719 (85.91%)
- Time zone: UTC+5:30 (IST)
- PIN: 743145 (Kanchrapara)
- Telephone code: 033
- ISO 3166 code: IN-WB
- Vehicle registration: WB-23, WB-24, WB-25, WB-26
- Lok Sabha constituency: Barrackpore
- Vidhan Sabha constituency: Naihati, Jagatdal, Bijpur
- Website: north24parganas.nic.in

Barrackpore I (also spelled Barrackpur I) is a community development block that forms an administrative division in the Barrackpore subdivision of North 24 Parganas district in the Indian state of West Bengal.

== Geography ==
Jetia, a census town in Barrackpore I block, is located at 22°54′36″N 88°26′46″E.

Barrackpore I CD Block is bounded by Chakdaha CD Block in Nadia district in the north, Amdanga CD Block in the east, Barrackpore II CD Block in the south and Balagarh and Chinsurah-Mogra CD Blocks in Hooghly district, across the Hooghly River, in the west. The Barrackpore industrial belt includes municipalities such as Kanchrapara, Halisahar, Naihati, Bhatpara, Garulia and North Barracpore is also in the west.

Barrackpore I CD Block is part of the North Hooghly Flat, one of the three physiographic regions in the district located in the lower Ganges Delta. It is a raised alluvium area along the Hooghly, which forms the western boundary of the district.

Barrackpore I CD Block has an area of 95.44 km^{2}. It has 1 panchayat samity, 8 gram panchayats, 120 gram sansads (village councils), 39 mouzas and 38 inhabited villages, as per the District Statistical Handbook: North 24 Parganas. Naihati police station serves this block. Headquarters of this CD Block is at Panpur.

Gram panchayats of Barrackpore I block/ panchayat samiti are: Jetia, Kowgachi I, Majhipara–Palashi, Panpur–Keutia, Kampa–Chakla, Kowgachi II, Mamudpur and Shibdaspur.

== Demographics ==
=== Population ===
As per 2011 Census of India Barrackpur I CD Block had a total population of 194,333, of which 94,278 were rural and 100,055 were urban. There were 99,434 (51%) males and 94,899 (49%) females. Population below 6 years was 17,724. Scheduled Castes numbered 55,962 (28.80%) and Scheduled Tribes numbered 7,405 (3.81%).

As per 2001 census, Barrackpore I block has a total population of 157,018 out of which 81,158 were males and 75,860 were females.

There are several census towns in Barrackpore I CD Block (2011 census figures in brackets): Palladaha (5,994), Palashi (6,748), Nagdaha (8,192), Jetia (6,349), Balibhara (8,529), Dogachhia (5,705), Garshyamnagar (7,611), Noapara (10,819), Kaugachhi (17,001), Paltapara (6,408) and Ichhapur Defence Estate (5,219).

Outgrowths (2011 census figures in brackets): Scotribati (Ward No. 25) (2,099), Chakla (Ward No. 26) (3,668), Nanna (Ward No. 27) (3,464) and Panpur (Ward No. 36) (2,257).

Large villages in Barrackpore I CD Block (2011 census figures in brackets): Kanpa (4,451), Mamudpur (15,190), Rambati (4,919), Keutia (4,919) and Hansia (4,107).

North 24 Parganas district is densely populated, mainly because of the influx of refugees from East Pakistan (later Bangladesh). With a density of population of 2,182 per km^{2} in 1971, it was 3rd in terms of density per km^{2} in West Bengal after Kolkata and Howrah, and 20th in India. According to the District Human Development Report: North 24 Parganas, “High density is also explained partly by the rapid growth of urbanization in the district. In 1991, the percentage of urban population in the district has been 51.23.”

Decadal Population Growth Rate (%)

The decadal growth of population in Barrackpore I CD Block in 2001-2011 was 16.43%. The decadal growth of population in Barrackpore I CD Block in 1991-2001 was -24.31%. Decadal growth of population during 1991-2001 was 25.92% in Kanchrapara municipality, 62.25% in Naihati municipality and 45.07% in Bhatpara municipality.

The decadal growth rate of population in North 24 Parganas district was as follows: 47.9% in 1951-61, 34.5% in 1961-71, 31.4% in 1971-81, 31.7% in 1981-91, 22.7% in 1991-2001 and 12.0% in 2001-11. The decadal growth rate for West Bengal in 2001-11 was 13.93%. The decadal growth rate for West Bengal was 17.84% in 1991-2001, 24.73% in 1981-1991 and 23.17% in 1971-1981.

Only a small portion of the border with Bangladesh has been fenced and it is popularly referred to as a porous border. It is freely used by Bangladeshi infiltrators, terrorists, smugglers, criminals. et al.

=== Literacy ===
As per the 2011 census, the total number of literates in Barrackpore I CD Block was 151,719 (85.91% of the population over 6 years) out of which males numbered 81,306 (89.98% of the male population over 6 years) and females numbered 70,413 (81.64% of the female population over 6 years). The gender disparity (the difference between female and male literacy rates) was 8.35%.

See also – List of West Bengal districts ranked by literacy rate

Literacy in CD blocks of
North 24 Parganas district
Barasat Sadar subdivision
Amdanga – 80.69%
Deganga – 79.65%
Barasat I – 81.50%
Barasat II – 77.71%
Habra I – 83.15%
Habra II – 81.05%
Rajarhat – 83.13%
Basirhat subdivision
Baduria – 78.75%
Basirhat I – 72.10%
Basirhat II – 78.30%
Haroa – 73.13%
Hasnabad – 71.47%
Hingalganj – 76.85%
Minakhan – 71.33%
Sandeshkhali I – 71.08%
Sandeshkhali II – 70.96%
Swarupnagar – 77.57%
Bangaon subdivision
Bagdah – 75.30%
Bangaon – 79.71%
Gaighata – 82.32%
Barrackpore subdivision
Barrackpore I – 85.91%
Barrackpore II – 84.53%
Source: 2011 Census: CD Block Wise
Primary Census Abstract Data

=== Language and religion ===
Religion in Barrackpur I CD block (2011)
Hinduism	84.38%
Islam	14.46%
Christianity	0.58%
Other or not stated	0.58%

In the 2011 census Hindus numbered 154,292 and formed 84.38% of the population in Barrackpur I CD Block. Muslims numbered 26,443 and formed 14.46% of the population. Others numbered 2,110 and formed 1.16% of the population.

In 1981 Hindus numbered 133,647 and formed 79.18% of the population and Muslims numbered 33,444 and formed 20.56% of the population in Barrackpur I CD Block. In 1981 Hindus numbered 113,755 and formed 76.76% of the population and Muslims numbered 34,003 and formed 22.94% of the population in Barrackpur II CD Block. In 1991 Hindus numbered 39,880 and formed 86.10% of the population and Muslims numbered 61,462 and formed 13.27% of the population in Barrackpur I and Barrackpur II CD Blocks taken together. (In 1981 and 1991 census was conducted as per jurisdiction of the police station.) In 2001, Hindus numbered 134,100 (85.39%) and Muslims 21,212 (13.51%).

Languages of Barrackpur I CD block (2011)
1. Bengali (90.3%)
2. Hindi (6.51%)
3. Santali (1.76%)
4. Others (1.47%)

At the time of the 2011 census, 90.26% of the population spoke Bengali, 6.51% Hindi and 1.76% Santali as their first language.

== Rural Poverty ==
18.46% of households in Barrackpore I CD Block lived below poverty line in 2001, against an average of 29.28% in North 24 Parganas district.

== Economy ==
=== Livelihood ===
Livelihood
in Barrackpore I CD Block
1. Cultivators (6.07%)
2. Agricultural labourers (14.2%)
3. Household industries (4.43%)
4. Other Workers (75.3%)

In Barrackpore I CD Block in 2011, amongst the class of total workers, cultivators numbered 3,867 and formed 6.07% of the total workers, agricultural labourers numbered 9,062 and formed 14.23%, household industry workers numbered 2,822 and formed 4.43% and other workers numbered 47,948 and formed 75.27%. Total workers numbered 63,699 and formed 34.84% of the total population, and non-workers numbered 119,146 and formed 65.16% of the population.

In more than 30 percent of the villages in North 24 Parganas, agriculture or household industry is no longer the major source of livelihood for the main workers there. The CD Blocks in the district can be classified as belonging to three categories: border areas, Sundarbans area and other rural areas. The percentage of other workers in the other rural areas category is considerably higher than those in the border areas and Sundarbans area.

Note: In the census records a person is considered a cultivator, if the person is engaged in cultivation/ supervision of land owned by self/government/institution. When a person who works on another person’s land for wages in cash or kind or share, is regarded as an agricultural labourer. Household industry is defined as an industry conducted by one or more members of the family within the household or village, and one that does not qualify for registration as a factory under the Factories Act. Other workers are persons engaged in some economic activity other than cultivators, agricultural labourers and household workers. It includes factory, mining, plantation, transport and office workers, those engaged in business and commerce, teachers, entertainment artistes and so on.

=== Infrastructure ===
There are 38 inhabited villages in Barrackpore I CD Block, as per the District Statistical Handbook: North 24 Parganas. 100% villages have power supply and drinking water supply. 11 villages (28.95%) have post offices. 36 villages (94.74%) have telephones (including landlines, public call offices and mobile phones). 16 villages (42.11%) have a pucca approach road and 16 villages (42.11%) have transport communication (includes bus service, rail facility and navigable waterways). 3 villages (7.89%) have agricultural credit societies and 1 village (2.63% ) has a bank.

=== Agriculture ===
The North 24 Parganas district Human Development Report opines that in spite of agricultural productivity in North 24 Parganas district being rather impressive 81.84% of rural population suffered from shortage of food. With a high urbanisation of 54.3% in 2001, the land use pattern in the district is changing quite fast and the area under cultivation is declining. However, agriculture is still the major source of livelihood in the rural areas of the district.

From 1977 on wards major land reforms took place in West Bengal. Land in excess of land ceiling was acquired and distributed amongst the peasants. Following land reforms land ownership pattern has undergone transformation. In 2010-11, persons engaged in agriculture in Barrackpore I CD Block could be classified as follows: bargadars 812 (4.51%), patta (document) holders 1,296 (7.19%), small farmers (possessing land between 1 and 2 hectares) 895 (4.97%), marginal farmers (possessing land up to 1 hectare) 6,310 (35.01%) and agricultural labourers 8,709 (48.32%). Barrackpore I CD Block had 73 fertiliser depots, 35 seed stores and 55 fair price shops in 2010-11.

In 2010-11, Barrackpore I CD Block produced 5,042 tonnes of Aman paddy, the main winter crop from 2,013 hectares, 6,562 tonnes of Boro paddy (spring crop) from 2,247 hectares and 3,794 tonnes of jute from 222 hectares. It also produced pulses and oilseeds.

In 2010-11, the total area irrigated in Barrackpore I CD Block was 304 hectares, all of which were irrigated by deep tube well.

=== Pisciculture ===
In 2010-11, the net area under effective pisciculture in Barrackpore I CD Block was 1,806.30 hectares. 12,554 persons were engaged in the profession. Approximate annual production was 54,189 quintals.

=== Banking ===
In 2010-11, Barrackpore I CD Block had offices of 11 commercial banks and 2 gramin banks.

== Transport ==
Both the SH 1 (between Shyambazar and Barrackpore it is also known as Barrackpore Trunk Road) and the Sealdah-Ranaghat line pass through the adjoining urban area. Some local roads pass through the CD Block.

== Education ==
In 2010-11, Barrackpore I CD Block had 67 primary schools with 6,449 students, 3 middle schools with 365 students, 11 high schools with 6,210 students and 3 higher secondary schools with 3,686 students. Barrackpore I CD Block had 4 professional/ technical institutions with 150 students and 267 institutions for special and non-formal education with 10,051 students.

As per the 2011 census, in Barrackpore I CD Block, amongst the 38 inhabited villages, 2 villages did not have a school, 19 villages had more than 1 primary school, 15 villages had at least 1 primary and 1 middle school and 13 villages had at least 1 middle and 1 secondary school.

== Healthcare ==
In 2011, Barrackpore I CD Block had 1 block primary health centre and 1 primary health centre, with total 15 beds and 2 doctors (excluding private bodies). It had 34 family welfare subcentres. 118 patients were treated indoors and 47,283 patients were treated outdoor in the hospitals, health centres and subcentres of the CD Block.
