= Jetia =

- Census Town
- Location in West Bengal, India Jetia (India)
- Coordinates: 22.921972°N 88.443361°E
- Country: India
- State: West Bengal
- District: North 24 Parganas

Area
  - Total: 1.97 km^{2} (0.76 sq mi)

Population (2011)
  - Total: 6,349
  - Density: 3,220/km^{2} (8,350/sq mi)

Languages
  - Official: Bengali, English
- Time zone: UTC+5:30 (IST)
- PIN: 743135
- Telephone code: +91 33
- ISO 3166 code: IN-WB
- Vehicle registration: WB
- Lok Sabha constituency: Barrackpore
- Vidhan Sabha constituency: Naihati
- Website: north24parganas.nic.in

Jetia is a census town in Barrackpore I CD Block in Barrackpore subdivision in North 24 Parganas district in the Indian state of West Bengal.

== Geography ==
Cities and towns in the northern portion of Barrackpore subdivision in North 24 Parganas district
M: municipal city/ town, CT: census town,
N: neighbourhood, OG: outgrowth
Owing to space constraints in the small map, the actual locations in a larger map may vary slightly

=== Location ===
Jetia is located at 22°54′36″N 88°26′46″E.

Palladaha, Nagdaha, Palashi and Srotribati (OG) form an urban cluster east of Kanchrapara. Jetia, Nanna (OG) and Chakla (OG) form another urban cluster south of Kanchrapara.

96% of the population of Barrackpore subdivision (partly presented in the map alongside) live in urban areas. In 2011, it had a density of population of 10,967 per km^{2} The subdivision has 16 municipalities and 24 census towns.

For most of the cities/ towns information regarding density of population is available in the Infobox. Population data is not available for neighbourhoods. It is available for the entire municipal area and thereafter ward-wise.

All places marked on the map are linked in the full-screen map.

=== Police station ===
Bizpur police station under Barrackpore Police Commissionerate has jurisdiction over Naihati municipal area and Barrackpore I CD Block, including Barrackpur Cantonment Board.

=== Post Office ===
Jetia has a delivery sub post office, with PIN 743135 in the North Presidency Division of North 24 Parganas district in Calcutta region. Other post offices with the same PIN are Lalkuthi, Hazinagar and Malancha.

== Demographics ==
=== Population ===
As per 2011 Census of India Jetia had a total population of 6,349, of which 3,246 (51%) were males and 3,103 (49%) were females. Population below 6 years was 415. The total number of literates in Jetia was 5,648 (95.18% of the population over 6 years).

As of 2001 India census, Jetia had a population of 5510. Males constitute 51% of the population and females 49%. Jetia has an average literacy rate of 85%, higher than the national average of 59.5%; male literacy is 88%, and female literacy is 82%. In Jetia, 7% of the population is under six years of age.

=== Kolkata Urban Agglomeration ===
The following Municipalities, Census Towns and other locations in Barrackpore subdivision were part of Kolkata Urban Agglomeration in the 2011 census: Kanchrapara (M), Jetia (CT), Halisahar (M), Balibhara (CT), Naihati (M), Bhatpara (M), Kaugachhi (CT), Garshyamnagar (CT), Garulia (M), Ichhapur Defence Estate (CT), North Barrackpur (M), Barrackpur Cantonment (CB), Barrackpore (M), Jafarpur (CT), Ruiya (CT), Titagarh (M), Khardaha (M), Bandipur (CT), Panihati (M), Muragachha (CT) New Barrackpore (M), Chandpur (CT), Talbandha (CT), Patulia (CT), Kamarhati (M), Baranagar (M), South Dumdum (M), North Dumdum (M), Dum Dum (M), Noapara (CT), Babanpur (CT), Teghari (CT), Nanna (OG), Chakla (OG), Srotribati (OG) and Panpur (OG).

== Infrastructure ==
As per the District Census Handbook 2011, Jetia covered an area of 1.97 km^{2}. It had 2 primary schools, 1 middle school, 1 secondary school and 1 senior secondary school. Jetia is 5 km from Naihati.

== Transport ==
Jetia is beside Kalyani Expressway.

The Halisahar railway station on the Sealdah-Ranaghat line is located nearby.

== Healthcare ==
North 24 Parganas district has been identified as one of the areas where ground water is affected by arsenic contamination.
