= Teghari =

- Census Town
- Location in West Bengal, India Teghari (India)
- Coordinates: 22.6892°N 88.4151°E
- Country: India
- State: West Bengal
- District: North 24 Parganas

Area
  - Total: 0.77 km^{2} (0.30 sq mi)

Population (2011)
  - Total: 8,491
  - Density: 11,000/km^{2} (29,000/sq mi)

Languages
  - Official: Bengali, English
- Time zone: UTC+5:30 (IST)
- PIN: 700111
- Telephone code: +91 33
- Vehicle registration: WB
- Lok Sabha constituency: Dum Dum
- Vidhan Sabha constituency: Khardaha
- Website: north24parganas.nic.in

Teghari is a census town in Barrackpore II CD Block in Barrackpore subdivision of North 24 Parganas district in the state of West Bengal, India.

== Geography ==
Cities and towns in the southern portion of Barrackpore subdivision in North 24 Parganas district
M: municipal city/ town, CT: census town,
N: neighbourhood/ administrative location
Owing to space constraints in the small map, the actual locations in a larger map may vary slightly

=== Location ===
Muragachha, Talbandha, Chandpur and Teghari form a cluster of census towns around/ near the Sodepur-Madhyamgram Road, between Panihati and New Barrackpur.

96% of the population of Barrackpore subdivision (partly presented in the map alongside, all places marked on the map are linked in the full screen map) lives in urban areas. In 2011, it had a density of population of 10,967 per km^{2}. The subdivision has 16 municipalities and 24 census towns.

For most of the cities/ towns information regarding density of population is available in the Infobox. Population data is not available for neighbourhoods. It is available for the entire Municipal area and thereafter ward-wise.

=== Police station ===
Khardaha police station under Barrackpore Police Commissionerate has jurisdiction over Khardaha Municipal area and Barrackpore II CD Block.

== Demographics ==
=== Population ===
As per the 2011 Census of India, Teghari had a total population of 8,491, of which 4,324 (51%) were males and 4,167 (49%) were females. Population below 6 years was 827. The total number of literates in Teghari was 6,613 (86.29% of the population over 6 years).

=== Kolkata Urban Agglomeration ===
The following Municipalities, Census Towns and other locations in Barrackpore subdivision were part of Kolkata Urban Agglomeration in the 2011 census: Kanchrapara (M), Jetia (CT), Halisahar (M), Balibhara (CT), Naihati (M), Bhatpara (M), Kaugachhi (CT), Garshyamnagar (CT), Garulia (M), Ichhapur Defence Estate (CT), North Barrackpur (M), Barrackpur Cantonment (CB), Barrackpore (M), Jafarpur (CT), Ruiya (CT), Titagarh (M), Khardaha (M), Bandipur (CT), Panihati (M), Muragachha (CT) New Barrackpore (M), Chandpur (CT), Talbandha (CT), Patulia (CT), Kamarhati (M), Baranagar (M), South Dumdum (M), North Dumdum (M), Dum Dum (M), Noapara (CT), Babanpur (CT), Teghari (CT), Nanna (OG), Chakla (OG), Srotribati (OG) and Panpur (OG).

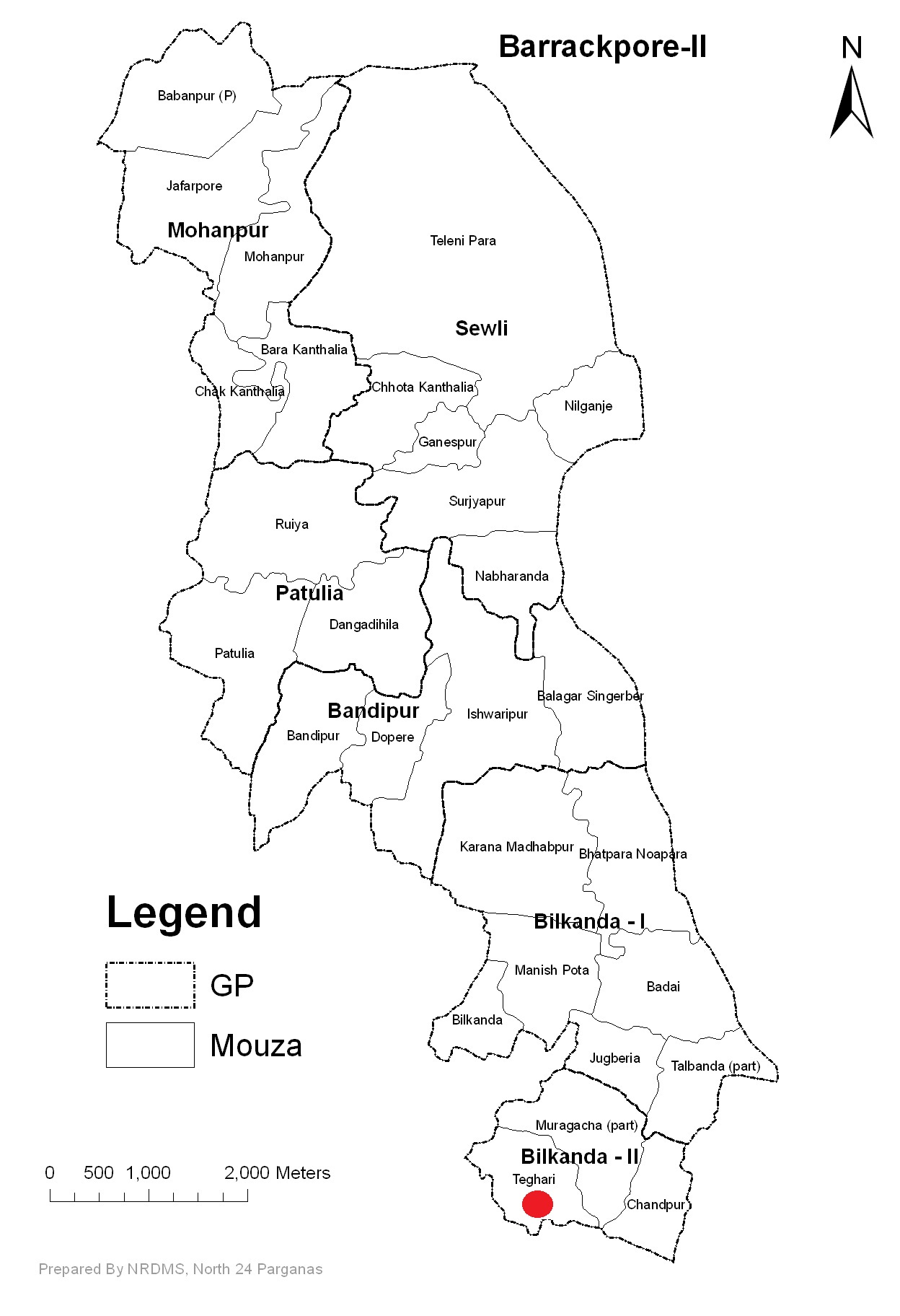
A map of Teghari (marked with a red dot) in comparison to surrounding regions

== Infrastructure ==
As per the District Census Handbook 2011, Teghari covered an area of 0.7657 km^{2}. Amongst the medical facilities it had were a dispensary/ health centre, a family welfare centre, a maternity home and 5 medicine shops. Amongst the educational facilities it had 4 primary schools. The nearest middle, secondary and senior secondary schools were available almost next door at Muragachha (officially half a kilometre away).

== Transport ==
Teghari is located on Kalyani Expressway.

The nearest railway stations are Madhyamgram railway station on the Sealdah-Bangaon line and Sodepur railway station on the Sealdah-Ranaghat line.

== Healthcare ==
Block Primary Health Centre at Bandipur is located nearby.
