= Barrackpore II =

- Community development block
- Interactive map of Barrackpore II
- Coordinates: 22.69°N 88.42°E
- Country: India
- State: West Bengal
- District: North 24 Parganas

Government
  - Type: Representative democracy

Area
  - Total: 40.74 km^{2} (15.73 sq mi)

Population (2011)
  - Total: 217,171
  - Density: 5,331/km^{2} (13,810/sq mi)

Languages
  - Official: Bengali, English

Literacy (2011)
  - Total literates: 165,866 (84,53%)
- Time zone: UTC+5:30 (IST)
- Telephone code: 033
- ISO 3166 code: IN-WB
- Vehicle registration: WB-23, WB-24, WB-25, WB-26
- Lok Sabha constituency: Barrackpore, Dum Dum
- Vidhan Sabha constituency: Noapara, Khardaha
- Website: north24parganas.nic.in

Barrackpore II (also spelled Barrackpur II) is a community development block that forms an administrative division in Barrackpore subdivision of North 24 Parganas district in the Indian state of West Bengal.

== Geography ==
Muragachha, a census town in Barrackpore II block, is located at 22°41′N 88°25′E.

Barrackpore II CD Block is bounded by Barrackpore I CD Block in the north, Amdanga and Barasat I CD Blocks in the east and Chinsurah Mogra CD Block in Hooghly district, across the Hooghly River, in the west. The Barrackpore industrial belt with municipalities such as New Barrackpur, Panihati, North Dumdum Khardaha, Titagarh and Barrackpore is in the south and west.

Barrackpore II CD Block is part of the North Hooghly Flat, one of the three physiographic regions in the district located in the lower Ganges Delta. It is a raised alluvium area along the Hooghly, which forms the western boundary of the district.

Barrackpore II CD Block has an area of 40.74 km^{2}. It has 1 panchayat samity, 6 gram panchayats, 104 gram sansads (village councils), 21 mouzas and 21 inhabited villages, as per the District Statistical Handbook: North 24 Parganas. Khardaha police station serves this block. Headquarters of this CD Block is at Karna Madhabpur.

Gram panchayats of Barrackpore II block/ panchayat samiti are: Bandipur, Bilkanda–II, Patulia, Bilkanda–I, Mohanpur and Sewli Telenipara.

== Demographics ==
=== Population ===
As per 2011 Census of India Barrackpur II CD Block had a total population of 217,171, of which 51,874 were rural and 165,297 were urban. There were 111,282 (51%) males and 105,889 (49%) females. Population below 6 years was 20,953. Scheduled Castes numbered 53,987 (24.86%) and Scheduled Tribes numbered 4,906 (2.26%).

As per 2001 census, Barrackpore II block has a total population of 158,778 out of which 82,573 were males and 76,205 were females.

There are several census towns in Barrackpore II CD Block (2011 census figures in brackets): Babanpur (P) (8,942), Jafarpur (19,062), Mohanpur (9,096), Telenipara (17,781), Chak Kanthalia (11,108), Ruiya (17,661), Patulia (16,979), Bandipur (8,115), Talbandha (17,802), Bilkanda (6,081), Muragachha (13,249), Teghari (8,491) and Chandpur (10,930).

Large villages in Barrackpore II CD Block (2011 census figures in brackets): Chhota Kanthalia (4,052), Surjyapur (5,714), Dopere (5,276), Dhangadihila (5,827) and Iswaripur (5,155).

North 24 Parganas district is densely populated, mainly because of the influx of refugees from East Pakistan (later Bangladesh). With a density of population of 2,182 per km^{2} in 1971, it was 3rd in terms of density per km^{2} in West Bengal after Kolkata and Howrah, and 20th in India. According to the District Human Development Report: North 24 Parganas, "High density is also explained partly by the rapid growth of urbanization in the district. In 1991, the percentage of urban population in the district has been 51.23."

Decadal Population Growth Rate (%)

The decadal growth of population in Barrackpore II CD Block in 2001-2011 was 36.73%. The decadal growth of population in Barrackpore II CD Block in 1991-2001 was -25.42%. Decadal growth of population during 1991-2001 was 31.82% in Khardah municipality, 26.25% in Panihati municipality and 17.84% in Kamarhati municipality.

The decadal growth rate of population in North 24 Parganas district was as follows: 47.9% in 1951-61, 34.5% in 1961-71, 31.4% in 1971-81, 31.7% in 1981-91, 22.7% in 1991-2001 and 12.0% in 2001-11. The decadal growth rate for West Bengal in 2001-11 was 13.93%. The decadal growth rate for West Bengal was 17.84% in 1991-2001, 24.73% in 1981-1991 and 23.17% in 1971-1981.

Only a small portion of the border with Bangladesh has been fenced and it is popularly referred to as a porous border. It is freely used by Bangladeshi infiltrators, terrorists, smugglers, criminals et al.

=== Literacy ===
As per the 2011 census, the total number of literates in Barrackpore II CD Block was 165,866 (84.53% of the population over 6 years) out of which males numbered 88,801 (88.33% of the male population over 6 years) and females numbered 77,065 (80.54% of the female population over 6 years). The gender disparity (the difference between female and male literacy rates) was 7.79%.

See also – List of West Bengal districts ranked by literacy rate

Literacy in CD blocks of
North 24 Parganas district
Barasat Sadar subdivision
Amdanga – 80.69%
Deganga – 79.65%
Barasat I – 81.50%
Barasat II – 77.71%
Habra I – 83.15%
Habra II – 81.05%
Rajarhat – 83.13%
Basirhat subdivision
Baduria – 78.75%
Basirhat I – 72.10%
Basirhat II – 78.30%
Haroa – 73.13%
Hasnabad – 71.47%
Hingalganj – 76.85%
Minakhan – 71.33%
Sandeshkhali I – 71.08%
Sandeshkhali II – 70.96%
Swarupnagar – 77.57%
Bangaon subdivision
Bagdah – 75.30%
Bangaon – 79.71%
Gaighata – 82.32%
Barrackpore subdivision
Barrackpore I – 85.91%
Barrackpore II – 84.53%
Source: 2011 Census: CD Block Wise
Primary Census Abstract Data

=== Language and religion ===
Religion in Barrackpur II CD block (2011)
Hinduism	77.71%
Islam	21.45%
Other or not stated	0.84%

In the 2011 census Hindus numbered 168,756 and formed 77.70% of the population in Barrackpur II CD Block. Muslims numbered 46,594 and formed 21.46% of the population. Others numbered 1,821 and formed 0.84% of the population.

In 1981 Hindus numbered 133,647 and formed 79.18% of the population and Muslims numbered 33,444 and formed 20.56% of the population in Barrackpur I CD Block. In 1981 Hindus numbered 113,755 and formed 76.76% of the population and Muslims numbered 34,003 and formed 22.94% of the population in Barrackpur II CD Block. In 1991 Hindus numbered 39,880 and formed 86.10% of the population and Muslims numbered 61,462 and formed 13.27% of the population in Barrackpur I and Barrackpur II CD Blocks taken together. (In 1981 and 1991 census was conducted as per jurisdiction of the police station). In 2001, Hindus numbered 126,921 (79.91%) and Muslims 30,904 (19.46%).

Languages of Barrackpur II CD block (2011)
1. Bengali (92.5%)
2. Hindi (5.92%)
3. Others (1.57%)

At the time of the 2011 census, 92.51% of the population spoke Bengali and 5.92% Hindi as their first language.

== Rural Poverty ==
16.78% of households in Barrackpore II CD Block lived below poverty line in 2001, against an average of 29.28% in North 24 Parganas district.

== Economy ==
=== Livelihood ===
Livelihood
in Barrackpore II CD Block
1. Cultivators (1.89%)
2. Agricultural labourers (1.91%)
3. Household industries (3.88%)
4. Other Workers (92.3%)

In Barrackpore II CD Block in 2011, amongst the class of total workers, cultivators numbered 1,444 and formed 1.89% of the total workers, agricultural labourers numbered 1,461 and formed 1.91%, household industry workers numbered 2,963 and formed 3.88% and other workers numbered 70,541 and formed 92.32%. Total workers numbered 76,409 and formed 35.18% of the total population, and non-workers numbered 140,762 and formed 64.82% of the population.

In more than 30 percent of the villages in North 24 Parganas, agriculture or household industry is no longer the major source of livelihood for the main workers there. The CD Blocks in the district can be classified as belonging to three categories: border areas, Sundarbans area and other rural areas. The percentage of other workers in the other rural areas category is considerably higher than those in the border areas and Sundarbans area.

Note: In the census records a person is considered a cultivator, if the person is engaged in cultivation/ supervision of land owned by self/government/institution. When a person who works on another person’s land for wages in cash or kind or share, is regarded as an agricultural labourer. Household industry is defined as an industry conducted by one or more members of the family within the household or village, and one that does not qualify for registration as a factory under the Factories Act. Other workers are persons engaged in some economic activity other than cultivators, agricultural labourers and household workers. It includes factory, mining, plantation, transport and office workers, those engaged in business and commerce, teachers, entertainment artistes and so on.

=== Infrastructure ===
There are 15 inhabited villages in Barrackpore II CD Block, as per the District. 100% villages have power supply and drinking water supply. 2 villages (13.33%) have post offices. 15 villages (100%) have telephones (including landlines, public call offices and mobile phones). 15 villages (100%) have a pucca approach road and 7 villages (46.67%) have transport communication (includes bus service, rail facility and navigable waterways). 1 village (6.67% ) has a bank.

=== Agriculture ===
The North 24 Parganas district Human Development Report opines that in spite of agricultural productivity in North 24 Parganas district being rather impressive 81.84% of rural population suffered from shortage of food. With a high urbanisation of 54.3% in 2001, the land use pattern in the district is changing quite fast and the area under cultivation is declining. However, agriculture is still the major source of livelihood in the rural areas of the district.

From 1977 on wards major land reforms took place in West Bengal. Land in excess of land ceiling was acquired and distributed amongst the peasants. Following land reforms land ownership pattern has undergone transformation. In 2010-11, persons engaged in agriculture in Barrackpore II CD Block could be classified as follows: bargadars 22 (0.48%), patta (document) holders 632 (13.92%), small farmers (possessing land between 1 and 2 hectares) 180 (3.97%), marginal farmers (possessing land up to 1 hectare) 2,170 (47.81%) and agricultural labourers 1,535 (33.82%).

Barrackpore II CD Block had 10 fertiliser depots, 2 seed stores and 24 fair price shops in 2010-11.

In 2010-11, Barrackpore II CD Block produced 322 tonnes of Aman paddy, the main winter crop from 122 hectares, 1,515 tonnes of Boro paddy (spring crop) from 514 hectares, 513 tonnes of jute from 30 hectares, 287 tonnes of potatoes from 15 hectares and 81 tonnes of sugar cane from 1 hectare. It also produced oilseeds.

In 2010-11, the total area irrigated in Barrackpore II CD Block was 209 hectares, of which 100 hectares were irrigated by river lift irrigation and 109 hectares by deep tube well.

=== Pisciculture ===
In 2010-11, the net area under effective pisciculture in Barrackpore II CD Block was 294.71 hectares. 5,785 persons were engaged in the profession. Approximate annual production was 8,841.3 quintals.

=== Banking ===
In 2010-11, Barrackpore II CD Block had offices of 12 commercial banks and 1 gramin bank.

== Transport ==
In 2010-11, Barrackpore II CD Block had 2 originating/ terminating bus routes.

The SH 1 (between Shaymbazar and Barrackpore it is also known as Barrackpore Trunk Road), the Sealdah-Ranaghat line and the Sealdah-Bangaon line pass through the adjoining urban area. SH 2 passes through the CD Block.

== Education ==
In 2010-11, Barrackpore II CD Block had 24 primary schools with 3,091 students, 6 high schools with 3,025 students and 9 higher secondary schools with 10,520 students. Barrackpore II CD Block had 1 general college with 1,782 students and 280 institutions for special and non-formal education with 14,275 students.

As per the 2011 census, in Barrackpore II CD Block, amongst the 15 inhabited villages, all villages had a school, 9 villages had more than 1 primary school, 5 villages had at least 1 primary and 1 middle school and 4 villages had at least 1 middle and 1 secondary school.

== Healthcare ==
In 2011, Barrackpore II CD Block had 1 block primary health centre and 2 primary health centres, with total 15 beds and 3 doctors (excluding private bodies). It had 31 family welfare subcentres. 768 patients were treated indoor and 39,571 patients were treated outdoor in the hospitals, health centres and subcentres of the CD Block.
