= Ramakrishna Paramhansa University =

Proposed university in West Bengal, India

Ramakrishna Paramhansa University is a proposed private university set to be established in Agarpara, North 24 Parganas, West Bengal, India. Approved by the West Bengal Legislative Assembly in December 2024, the university is part of the state's efforts to enhance higher education infrastructure and opportunities.

== Overview ==
The university is named after Ramakrishna Paramhansa, the renowned 19th-century spiritual leader, and aims to integrate his principles of inclusivity and universal spirituality with modern education. It will offer programs across diverse disciplines, catering to the growing demand for quality higher education in the region. Alongside Rabindranath Tagore University in Hooghly, it is one of two private universities approved under the West Bengal Private University Act of 2024.
