= Nawabganj, North 24 Parganas =

Nawabganj
- Neighbourhood
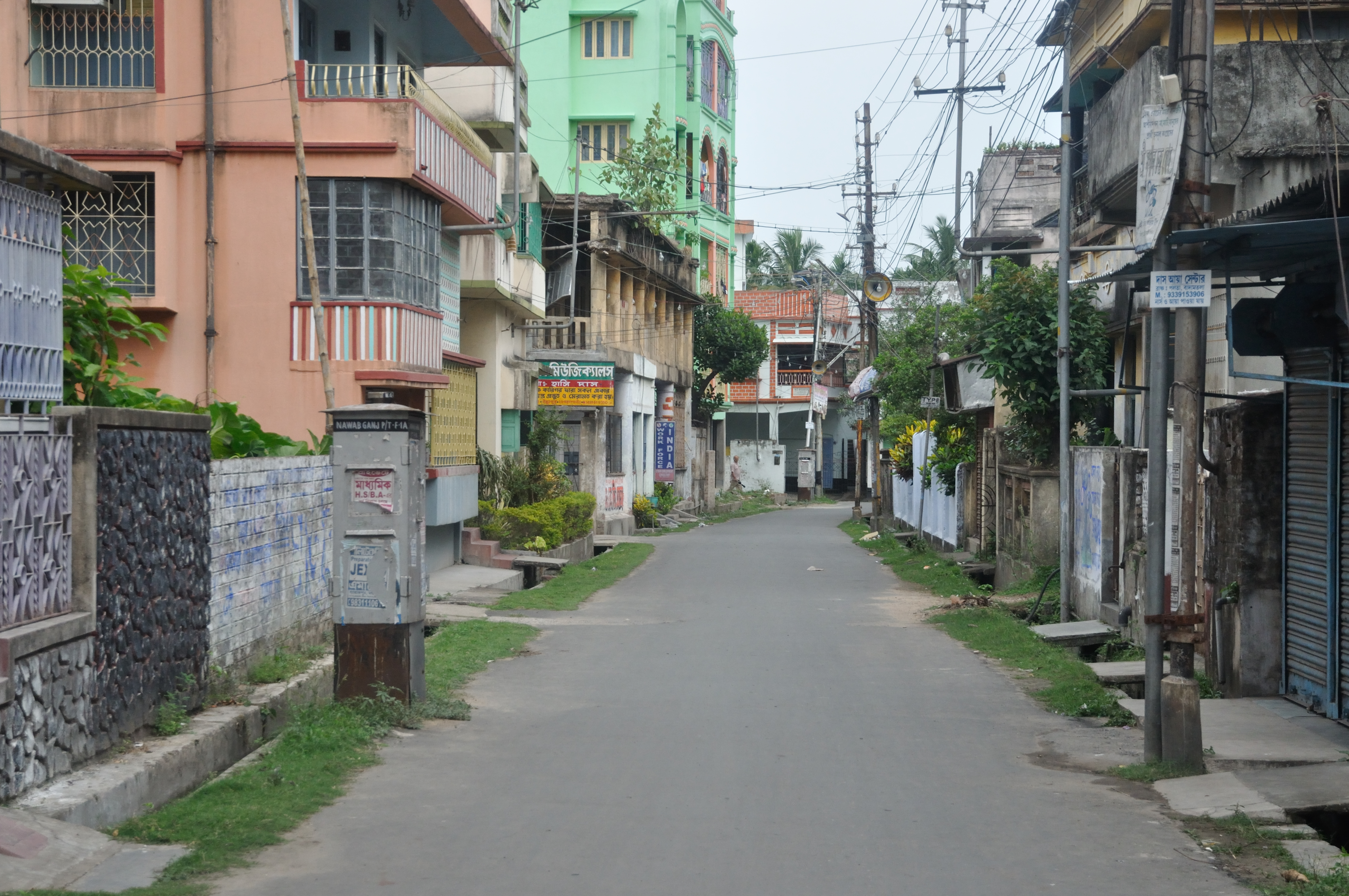
- Local road at Nawabganj

- Location in West Bengal, India Nawabganj (India)
- Coordinates: 22.795674°N 88.363675°E
- Country: India
- State: West Bengal
- Division: Presidency
- District: North 24 Parganas

Government
  - Type: Municipality
  - Body: North Barrackpur Municipality

Languages
  - Official: Bengali, English
- Time zone: UTC+5:30 (IST)
- PIN: 743144
- Telephone code: +91 33
- Vehicle registration: WB
- Lok Sabha constituency: Barrackpore
- Vidhan Sabha constituency: Noapara
- Website: north24parganas.nic.in

Nawabganj is a neighbourhood in North Barrackpur of North 24 Parganas district in the Indian state of West Bengal. It is a part of the area covered by Kolkata Metropolitan Development Authority (KMDA).

== Geography ==
Nawabganj is located at 22.795674°N 88.363675°E. It has an average elevation of 12 m (39 ft).
