= Garshyamnagar =

Garshyamnagar Shyamnagar
- Census Town
- Location in West Bengal, India Garshyamnagar (India)
- Coordinates: 22.8254°N 88.3842°E
- Country: India
- State: West Bengal
- District: North 24 Parganas

Area
  - Total: 1.08 km^{2} (0.42 sq mi)

Population (2011)
  - Total: 7,611
  - Density: 7,050/km^{2} (18,300/sq mi)

Languages
  - Official: Bengali, English
- Time zone: UTC+5:30 (IST)
- Telephone code: +91 33
- ISO 3166 code: IN-WB
- Vehicle registration: WB
- Lok Sabha constituency: Barrackpore
- Vidhan Sabha constituency: Noapara
- Website: north24parganas.nic.in

Garshyamnagar (also known as Shyamnagar) is a census town in Barrackpore I CD Block in Barrackpore subdivision in North 24 Parganas district in the state of West Bengal, India.

== Geography ==
Cities and towns in the northern portion of Barrackpore subdivision in North 24 Parganas district
M: municipal city/ town, CT: census town,
N: neighbourhood, OG: outgrowth
Owing to space constraints in the small map, the actual locations in a larger map may vary slightly

=== Location ===
Garshyamnagar, Noapara, Kaugachhi and Paltapara form an urban cluster east of Garulia and North Barrackpur. Ichhapur Defence Estate lies on the west of North Barrackpur.

96% of the population of Barrackpore subdivision (partly presented in the map alongside) live in urban areas. In 2011, it had a density of population of 10,967 per km^{2}. The subdivision has 16 municipalities and 24 census towns.

For most of the cities/ towns information regarding density of population is available in the Infobox. Population data is not available for neighbourhoods. It is available for the entire municipal area and thereafter ward-wise.

All places marked on the map are linked in the full-screen map.

=== Police station ===
Naihati police station under Barrackpore Police Commissionerate has jurisdiction over Naihati municipal area and Barrackpore I CD Block, including Barrackpur Cantonment Board.

== Demographics ==
=== Population ===
As per 2011 Census of India, Garshyamnagar had a total population of 7,611, of which 3,840 (50%) were males and 3,771 (50%) were females. Population below 6 years was 558. The total number of literates in Garshyamnagar was 6,417 (90.98% of the population over 6 years).

As of 2001 India census, Garshyamnagar had a population of 7,354. Males constitute 50% of the population and females 50%. Garshyamnagar has an average literacy rate of 79%, higher than the national average of 59.5%: male literacy is 84%, and female literacy is 75%. In Garshyamnagar, 8% of the population is under 6 years of age.

=== Kolkata Urban Agglomeration ===
The following municipalities, census towns and other locations in Barrackpore subdivision were part of Kolkata Urban Agglomeration in the 2011 census: Kanchrapara (M), Jetia (CT), Halisahar (M), Balibhara (CT), Naihati (M), Bhatpara (M), Kaugachhi (CT), Garshyamnagar (CT), Garulia (M), Ichhapur Defence Estate (CT), North Barrackpur (M), Barrackpur Cantonment (CB), Barrackpore (M), Jafarpur (CT), Ruiya (CT), Titagarh (M), Khardaha (M), Bandipur (CT), Panihati (M), Muragachha (CT), New Barrackpore (M), Chandpur (CT), Talbandha (CT), Patulia (CT), Kamarhati (M), Baranagar (M), South Dumdum (M), North Dumdum (M), Dum Dum (M), Noapara (CT), Babanpur (CT), Teghari (CT), Nanna (OG), Chakla (OG), Srotribati (OG) and Panpur (OG).

== Infrastructure ==
As per the District Census Handbook 2011, Garshyamnagar covered an area of 1.08 km^{2}. Amongst the medical facilities it had there were 4 medicine shops. Amongst the educational facilities it had there were 3 primary schools, the nearest middle and secondary schools were available 2.5 km away at Gurdaha, and the nearest senior secondary school was available 12 km away at Naihati.

== Healthcare ==
North 24 Parganas district has been identified as one of the areas where ground water is affected by arsenic contamination.
