= Barrackpur Cantonment =

Barrackpore Cantonment
- Town
- Barrackpore
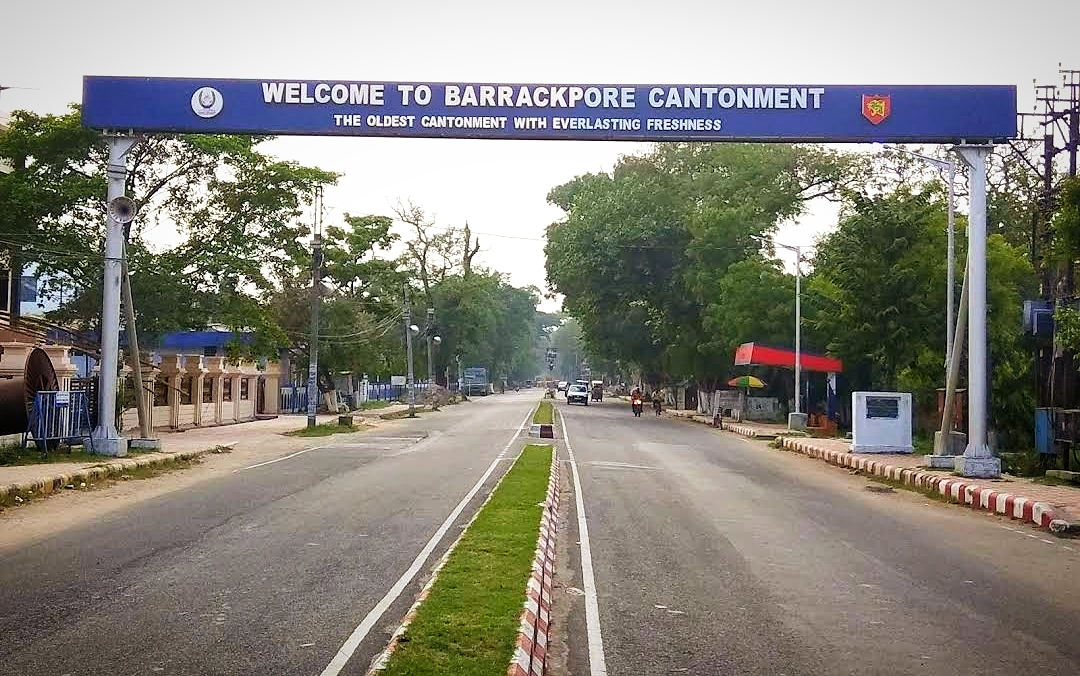
- Barrackpore Cantonment
- Nickname: Military City
- Location in West Bengal, India Barrackpore Cantonment (India)
- Coordinates: 22.78°N 88.48°E
- Country: India
- State: West Bengal
- City: Kolkata
- District: North 24 Parganas
- Established: 1765
- Founder: British East India Company

Government
  - Type: Cantonment Board
  - Body: Barrackpore Cantonment

Population (2011)
  - Total: 17,380

Languages
  - Official: Bengali, Hindi, English
- Time zone: UTC+5:30 (IST)
- PIN: 700120
- Telephone code: +91 33
- Vehicle registration: WB
- Lok Sabha constituency: Barrackpore
- Vidhan Sabha constituency: Noapara
- Website: north24parganas.nic.in cbbarrackpore.org

Barrackpore Cantonment is a town and a cantonment board in Kolkata in North 24 Parganas district in the Indian state of West Bengal. It is a part of the area covered by Kolkata Metropolitan Development Authority (KMDA).

== History ==
The military station of Barrackpore came into being in 1765. It is the oldest cantonment in India.

== Geography ==
Cities and towns in the southern portion of Barrackpore subdivision in North 24 Parganas district
M: municipal city/ town, CT: census town,
N: neighbourhood/ administrative location
Owing to space constraints in the small map, the actual locations in a larger map may vary slightly

=== Location ===
96% of the population of Barrackpore subdivision (partly presented in the map alongside) live in urban areas. In 2011, it had a density of population of 10,967 per km^{2} The subdivision has 16 municipalities and 24 census towns.

For most of the cities/ towns information regarding density of population is available in the Infobox. Population data is not available for neighbourhoods. It is available for the entire municipal area and thereafter ward-wise.

All places marked on the map are linked in the full-screen map.

Barrackpur Cantonment is bounded by North Barrackpur on the north, Barrackpore on the east and south, and the Hooghly River on the west.

=== Police station ===
Barrackpore police station under Barrackpore Police Commissionerate has jurisdiction over Barrackpur Cantonment Board.

== Demographics ==
=== Population ===
As per the 2011 Census of India, Barrackpore Cantonment Board had a total population of 17,380, of which 8,872 (51%) were males and 8,508 (49%) were females. Population below 6 years was 1,447. The total number of literates in Barrackpore CB was 14,096 (88.47% of the population over 6 years).

As of 2001 India census, Barrackpur Cantonment had a population of 22,014. Males constitute 55% of the population and females 45%. Barrackpur Cantonment has an average literacy rate of 80%, higher than the national average of 59.5%; with 59% of the literates being male and 41% being female. 9% of the population is under 6 years of age.

=== Kolkata Urban Agglomeration ===
The following Municipalities, Census Towns and other locations in Barrackpore subdivision were part of Kolkata Urban Agglomeration in the 2011 census: Kanchrapara (M), Jetia (CT), Halisahar (M), Balibhara (CT), Naihati (M), Bhatpara (M), Kaugachhi (CT), Garshyamnagar (CT), Garulia (M), Ichhapur Defence Estate (CT), North Barrackpur (M), Barrackpur Cantonment (CB), Barrackpore (M), Jafarpur (CT), Ruiya (CT), Titagarh (M), Khardaha (M), Bandipur (CT), Panihati (M), Muragachha (CT) New Barrackpore (M), Chandpur (CT), Talbandha (CT), Patulia (CT), Kamarhati (M), Baranagar (M), South Dumdum (M), North Dumdum (M), Dum Dum (M), Noapara (CT), Babanpur (CT), Teghari (CT), Nanna (OG), Chakla (OG), Srotribati (OG) and Panpur (OG).

== Transportation ==
Barrackpore cantonment is connected through several roads like Barrack Road, Strand Road, Court Road etc. and with SN Bannerjee Road it's connected to Ghoshpara Road, Barrackpore-Barasat Road (towards Kalyani Expressway and National Highway 12) and Barrackpore Trunk Road. The nearest railway station is Barrackpore railway station, which is only 1 km away. There are three ferry service stations at Barrackpore - Dhobi ghat and Manirampore to Serampore Chhatugunj and Sheoraphuli. Nearest Civil Airport is Netaji Subhas Chandra Bose International Airport which is 25 km far away from the area. But there is a military Air Base in Barrackpore cantonment owned by Indian Air Force. In the Barrackpore Cantonment area there had a race course behind the criminal court and a special single rail track took steam engine-driven trains there, carrying British passengers who would attend the race. The line has been depreciated since and the Barrackpore Racecourse railway station is used by the Indian Army only.

Buses like 78, 81, 85, MM5, S32, C28, C29, AC20 and some others originate from Different points of the area like Fishery Gate, Barrackpore Court, Chiria More and Lalkuthi.

== Healthcare ==
North 24 Parganas district has been identified as one of the areas where ground water is affected by arsenic contamination. There are Cantonment General Hospital and Dr. Bhola Nath Bose sub divisional hospital nearby.

== See also ==
- Battle of Plassey
- Barrackpore Mutiny of 1824
- Mangal Pandey#indian Rebellion of 1857
