= Patulia =

- Census Town
- Location in West Bengal, India Patulia (India)
- Coordinates: 22.738829°N 88.394011°E
- Country: India
- State: West Bengal
- District: North 24 Parganas

Area
  - Total: 1.4 km^{2} (0.54 sq mi)

Population (2011)
  - Total: 16,979
  - Density: 12,000/km^{2} (31,000/sq mi)

Languages
  - Official: Bengali, English
- Time zone: UTC+5:30 (IST)
- PIN: 700119
- Telephone code: +91 33
- ISO 3166 code: IN-WB
- Vehicle registration: WB
- Lok Sabha constituency: Dum Dum
- Vidhan Sabha constituency: Khardaha
- Website: north24parganas.nic.in

Patulia is a census town in Barrackpore II CD Block in Barrackpore subdivision in North 24 Parganas district in the Indian state of West Bengal. Tarpan Dutta's home is in patulia

== Geography ==
Cities and towns in the southern portion of Barrackpore subdivision in North 24 Parganas district
M: municipal city/ town, CT: census town,
N: neighbourhood/ administrative location
Owing to space constraints in the small map, the actual locations in a larger map may vary slightly

=== Location ===
Patulia is located at 22°43′26″N 88°23′49″E.

Chak Kanthalia, Ruiya, Patulia and Bandipur form a cluster of census towns around Titagarh/ Khardaha. Karna Madhabpur, with the CD Block headquarters, and Nilganj are located nearby.

96% of the population of Barrackpore subdivision (partly presented in the map alongside, all places marked in the map are linked in the full screen map) lives in urban areas. In 2011, it had a density of population of 10,967 per km^{2}. The subdivision has 16 municipalities and 24 census towns.

For most of the cities/ towns information regarding density of population is available in the Infobox. Population data is not available for neighbourhoods. It is available for the entire Municipal area and thereafter ward-wise.

=== Police station ===
Khardaha police station under Barrackpore Police Commissionerate has jurisdiction over Khardaha Municipal area and Barrackpore II CD Block.

=== Post Office ===
Patulia has a delivery branch post office, with PIN 700119 in the North Presidency Division of North 24 Parganas district in Calcutta region. Other post offices with the same PIN are Bisalakshi Ghat, Bandipur, Bramhasthan and Titagarh.

== Demographics ==
=== Population ===
As per 2011 Census of India Patulia had a total population of 16,979, of which 8,627 (51%) were males and 8,352 (49%) were females. Population below 6 years was 1,481. The total number of literates in Patulia was 13,739 (88.65% of the population over 6 years).

As of 2001 India census, Patulia had a population of 13,825. Males constitute 52% of the population and females 48%. Patulia has an average literacy rate of 80%, higher than the national average of 59.5%: male literacy is 84% and female literacy is 75%. In Patulia, 9% of the population is under 6 years of age.

=== Kolkata Urban Agglomeration ===
The following Municipalities, Census Towns and other locations in Barrackpore subdivision were part of Kolkata Urban Agglomeration in the 2011 census: Kanchrapara (M), Jetia (CT), Halisahar (M), Balibhara (CT), Naihati (M), Bhatpara (M), Kaugachhi (CT), Garshyamnagar (CT), Garulia (M), Ichhapur Defence Estate (CT), North Barrackpur (M), Barrackpur Cantonment (CB), Barrackpore (M), Jafarpur (CT), Ruiya (CT), Titagarh (M), Khardaha (M), Bandipur (CT), Panihati (M), Muragachha (CT) New Barrackpore (M), Chandpur (CT), Talbandha (CT), Patulia (CT), Kamarhati (M), Baranagar (M), South Dumdum (M), North Dumdum (M), Dum Dum (M), Noapara (CT), Babanpur (CT), Teghari (CT), Nanna (OG), Chakla (OG), Srotribati (OG) and Panpur (OG).

== Infrastructure ==
As per the District Census Handbook 2011, Patulia covered an area of 1.4 km^{2}. Amongst the medical facilities it has 10 medicine shops. Amongst the educational facilities it has 6 primary schools, 2 middle schools, 2 secondary schools and 1 senior secondary school. The nearest degree college is available within 1.5 km at Khardah (Ramkrishna Mission V.C.College).

== Transport ==
Patulia is a little away from Kalyani Expressway and is linked to the latter by short local roads.

Titagarh railway station and Khardaha railway station on the Sealdah-Ranaghat line are located nearby.

== Education ==
Patulia High School is a Bengali-medium boys only higher secondary school. It was established in 1960.

Patulia Girls High School is a Bengali-medium girls only higher secondary school. It was established in 1968.

== Healthcare ==
Block Primary Health Centre at Bandipur is located nearby.

North 24 Parganas district has been identified as one of the areas where ground water is affected by arsenic contamination.
