= Ichhapur Defence Estate =

- Census Town
- Location in West Bengal, India Ichhapur Defence Estate (India)
- Coordinates: 22.81°N 88.37°E
- Country: India
- State: West Bengal
- District: North 24 Parganas

Area
  - Total: 2.31 km^{2} (0.89 sq mi)
- Elevation: 12 m (39 ft)

Population (2011)
  - Total: 5,219
  - Density: 2,260/km^{2} (5,850/sq mi)

Languages
  - Official: Bengali, English
- Time zone: UTC+5:30 (IST)
- PIN: 743144
- Telephone code: +91 33
- ISO 3166 code: IN-WB
- Vehicle registration: WB
- Lok Sabha constituency: Barrackpore
- Vidhan Sabha constituency: Noapara
- Website: north24parganas.nic.in

Ichhapur Defence Estate is a census town in Barrackpore I CD Block in Barrackpore subdivision in North 24 Parganas district in the Indian state of West Bengal.

== Geography ==
Cities and towns in the northern portion of Barrackpore subdivision in North 24 Parganas district
M: municipal city/ town, CT: census town,
N: neighbourhood, OG: outgrowth
Owing to space constraints in the small map, the actual locations in a larger map may vary slightly

=== Location ===
Ichhapur is located at 22.81°N 88.37°E. It has an average elevation of 12 m (39 ft).

96% of the population of Barrackpore subdivision (partly presented in the map alongside) live in urban areas. In 2011, it had a density of population of 10,967 per km^{2}. The subdivision has 16 municipalities and 24 census towns.

For most of the cities/ towns information regarding density of population is available in the Infobox. Population data is not available for neighbourhoods. It is available for the entire municipal area and thereafter ward-wise.

All places marked on the map are linked in the full-screen map.

=== Police station ===
Naihati police station under Barrackpore Police Commissionerate has jurisdiction over Naihati municipal area and Barrackpore I CD Block, including Barrackpur Cantonment Board.

== Demographics ==
=== Population ===
As per 2011 Census of India Ichhapur Defence Estate had a total population of 5,219, of which 2,700 (52%) were males and 2,519 (48%) were females. Population below 6 years was 486. The total number of literates in Ichhapur Defence Estate was 4,125 (87.15% of the population over 6 years).

As of 2001 India census, Ichhapur Defence Estate had a population of 10,348. Males constitute 54% of the population and females 46%. Ichhapur Defence Estate has an average literacy rate of 82%, higher than the national average of 59.5%: male literacy is 87%, and female literacy is 75%. In Ichhapur Defence Estate, 7% of the population is under 6 years of age.

=== Kolkata Urban Agglomeration ===
The following Municipalities, Census Towns and other locations in Barrackpore subdivision were part of Kolkata Urban Agglomeration in the 2011 census: Kanchrapara (M), Jetia (CT), Halisahar (M), Balibhara (CT), Naihati (M), Bhatpara (M), Kaugachhi (CT), Garshyamnagar (CT), Garulia (M), Ichhapur Defence Estate (CT), North Barrackpur (M), Barrackpur Cantonment (CB), Barrackpore (M), Jafarpur (CT), Ruiya (CT), Titagarh (M), Khardaha (M), Bandipur (CT), Panihati (M), Muragachha (CT), New Barrackpore (M), Chandpur (CT), Talbandha (CT), Patulia (CT), Kamarhati (M), Baranagar (M), South Dumdum (M), North Dumdum (M), Dum Dum (M), Noapara (CT), Babanpur (CT), Teghari (CT), Nanna (OG), Chakla (OG), Srotribati (OG) and Panpur (OG).

== Infrastructure ==
As per the District Census Handbook 2011, Ichhapur Defence Estate covered an area of 2.31 km^{2}. Amongst the medical facilities it had were 1 charitable hospital/ nursing home and 4 medicine shops. Amongst the educational facilities it had were 4 primary schools, 7 middle schools and 6 secondary schools.

== Economy ==
=== Ordnance factories ===
Rifle Factory, Ishapore
When the East India Company wanted to establish a gunpowder factory, they selected the location at Ichapore (or Ishapore, as it was known in those days), where the Dutch Ostend Company had operated a gunpowder factory from 1712 to 1744. The new gunpowder factory was operational from 1791 to 1902. In the early years of the 20th century, the same site was used for the location of a rifle factory and the Rifle Factory Ishapore (also known as Ishapore Arsenal) was established in 1904. It was likened to the Enfield, where the Royal Small Arms Factory produced the Lee–Enfield rifles, the main firearm used by the armed forces of the British Empire, and was called the "Enfield of India". Rifle Factory Ishapore has produced "blend of small arms from the kookriees, swords, bayonets, revolvers, pistols, carbines, muskets, bazooka launcher rockets to 7.62 SLR Ishapore Rifles, 9mm Auto Pistols and 5.56 INSAS." The INSAS assault rifle has been the standard infantry weapon of the Indian Armed Forces. However, INSAS rifles are set to be replaced by an imported rifle, to be produced in the country later.

Metal and Steel Factory, Ishapore
Metal and Steel Factory is the main producer of basic ferrous and non-ferrous inputs for military hardware. It has state-of-the-art facilities for special steel making. The facilities were a part of the Gun and Shell Factory at Cossipore from 1862. The facilities were relocated to Ishapore in 1905 but continued to function as a part of the Gun and Shell Factory. In 1920, it became an independent unit under the Ordnance Factories Board.

== Transport ==
Ichapur Defence Estate is on State Highway 1 (locally known as Ghoshpara Road). Ichhapur railway station is located nearby.

== Healthcare ==
North 24 Parganas district has been identified as one of the areas where ground water is affected by arsenic contamination.
