= Noapara, North 24 Parganas =

Noapara Earlier it was known as Nowpara
- Census Town
- Location in West Bengal, India Noapara (India)
- Coordinates: 22°48′46″N 88°22′52″E
- Country: India
- State: West Bengal
- District: North 24 Parganas

Area
  - Total: 1.26 km^{2} (0.49 sq mi)

Population (2011)
  - Total: 10,819
  - Density: 8,590/km^{2} (22,200/sq mi)

Languages
  - Official: Bengali, English
- Time zone: UTC+5:30 (IST)
- PIN: 743201, 743221
- Telephone code: +91 33
- ISO 3166 code: IN-WB
- Vehicle registration: WB
- Lok Sabha constituency: Barrackpore
- Vidhan Sabha constituency: Noapara
- Website: wb.gov.in

Noapara is a census town in Barrackpore I CD Block in Barrackpore subdivision of North 24 Parganas district in the Indian state of West Bengal. It is a part of Kolkata Urban Agglomeration.

== Geography ==
Cities and towns in the northern portion of Barrackpore subdivision in North 24 Parganas district
M: municipal city/ town, CT: census town,
N: neighbourhood, OG: outgrowth
Owing to space constraints in the small map, the actual locations in a larger map may vary slightly

=== Location ===
Noapara is located at 22°49′20″N 88°22′11″E.

Garshyamnagar, Noapara, Kaugachhi and Paltapara form an urban cluster east of Garulia and North Barrackpur. Ichhapur Defence Estate lies on the west of North Barrackpur.

96% of the population of Barrackpore subdivision (partly presented in the map alongside) live in urban areas. In 2011, it had a density of population of 10,967 per km^{2}. The subdivision has 16 municipalities and 24 census towns.

For most of the cities/towns information regarding density of population is available in the Infobox. Population data is not available for neighbourhoods. It is available for the entire municipal area and thereafter ward-wise.

All places marked on the map are linked in the full-screen map.

=== Police station ===
Noapara police station under Barrackpore Police Commissionerate has jurisdiction over Garulia and North Barrackpur municipal areas.

== Demographics ==
=== Population ===
As per 2011 Census of India, Noapara had a total population of 10,819, of which 5,524 (51%) were males and 5,295 (49%) were females. Population below 6 years was 1,013. The total number of literates in Noapara was 8,251 (84.14% of the population over 6 years).

=== Kolkata Urban Agglomeration ===
The following Municipalities, Census Towns and other locations in Barrackpore subdivision were part of Kolkata Urban Agglomeration in the 2011 census: Kanchrapara (M), Jetia (CT), Halisahar (M), Balibhara (CT), Naihati (M), Bhatpara (M), Kaugachhi (CT), Garshyamnagar (CT), Garulia (M), Ichhapur Defence Estate (CT), North Barrackpur (M), Barrackpur Cantonment (CB), Barrackpore (M), Jafarpur (CT), Ruiya (CT), Titagarh (M), Khardaha (M), Bandipur (CT), Panihati (M), Muragachha (CT), New Barrackpore (M), Chandpur (CT), Talbandha (CT), Patulia (CT), Kamarhati (M), Baranagar (M), South Dumdum (M), North Dumdum (M), Dum Dum (M), Noapara (CT), Babanpur (CT), Teghari (CT), Nanna (OG), Chakla (OG), Srotribati (OG) and Panpur (OG).

== Infrastructure ==
As per the District Census Handbook 2011, Noapara covered an area of 1.2613 km^{2}. Amongst the medical facilities it had were 1 nursing home (with 20 beds) and 4 medicine shops. Amongst the educational facilities it had was 1 primary school; the nearest middle and secondary schools were available 4 km away at Gurdaha and the nearest senior secondary school was available 14 km away at Naihati.

== Transport ==
Noapara is beside State Highway 1 (locally called Ghoshpara Road).

The Shyamnagar railway station on the Sealdah-Ranaghat line is located nearby.

== Healthcare ==
North 24 Parganas district has been identified as one of the areas where ground water is affected by arsenic contamination.
