= North Barrackpur =

- City
- Location in West Bengal, India North Barrackpur (India)
- Coordinates: 22.79687°N 88.36691°E
- Country: India
- State: West Bengal
- Division: Presidency
- District: North 24 Parganas

Government
  - Type: Municipality
  - Body: North Barrackpur Municipality
  - Chairman: Moloy Kumar Ghosh

Area
  - Total: 12.61 km^{2} (4.87 sq mi)

Population (2011)
  - Total: 132,806
  - Density: 10,530/km^{2} (27,280/sq mi)

Languages
  - Official: Bengali, English
- Time zone: UTC+5:30 (IST)
- PIN: 743122, 743144
- Telephone code: +91 33
- ISO 3166 code: IN-WB
- Vehicle registration: WB
- Lok Sabha constituency: Barrackpore
- Vidhan Sabha constituency: Noapara
- Website: www.northbarrackporemunicipality.org

North Barrackpur is a city and a municipality of North 24 Parganas district in the Indian state of West Bengal. It is a part of the area covered by Kolkata Metropolitan Development Authority (KMDA).

== History ==
North Barrackpur Municipality was established in 1869. Sir Surendranath Banerjee was the first Indian elected chairman of the municipality in 1885. He held that office for 34 years from 1885 to 1889, and from 1891 to 1921.

== Geography ==
Cities and towns in the northern portion of Barrackpore subdivision in North 24 Parganas district
M: municipal city/ town, CT: census town,
N: neighbourhood, OG: outgrowth
Owing to space constraints in the small map, the actual locations in a larger map may vary slightly

=== Location ===
North Barrackpur is located at 22°46′37″N 88°20′45″E.

North Barrackpur Municipality is bounded by Garulia on the north, Noapara, Kaugachhi and Paltapara on the east, Barrackpur Cantonment, Barrackpore, Jafarpur, Babanpur, Mohanpur and Telenipara on the south and Ichhapur Defence Estate and the Hooghly on the west. Although not spelled out specifically, it is evident that such localities as Ichapore, Nawabganj, Palta, Anandamath, Mayapalli and Prantik are neighbourhoods in North Barrackpur.

96% of the population of Barrackpore subdivision (partly presented in the map alongside) live in urban areas. In 2011, it had a density of population of 10,967 per km^{2}. The subdivision has 16 municipalities and 24 census towns.

For most of the cities/ towns information regarding density of population is available in the Infobox. Population data is not available for neighbourhoods. It is available for the entire municipal area and thereafter ward-wise.

All places marked on the map are linked in the full-screen map.

=== Police station ===
Noapara police station & Barrackpore police station under Barrackpore Police Commissionerate has jurisdiction over Garulia and North Barrackpur Municipal areas.

=== Post Offices ===
Ichhapur has a non-delivery sub post office, with PIN 743144 in the North Presidency Division of North 24 Parganas district in Calcutta region. Other post offices with the same PIN are the Metal and Steel Factory, Anandamath, Ichapur Nawabganj, PS Bureau, Ichapur Rifle Factory and Kantadhar.

Bengal Enamel Post Office at Palta, North 24 Parganas is a delivery sub post office, with PIN 743122 in the North Presidency Division of North 24 Parganas district in Calcutta region. No other post office has the same PIN.

== Demographics ==
=== Population ===
Historical population
Year	Pop.	±%
1901	12,600	—
1911	11,847	−6.0%
1921	15,433	+30.3%
1931	16,258	+5.3%
1941	26,966	+65.9%
1951	32,173	+19.3%
1961	56,683	+76.2%
1971	76,335	+34.7%
1981	81,758	+7.1%
1991	100,606	+23.1%
2001	123,668	+22.9%
2011	132,806	+7.4%
Source: Census of India

As per the 2011 Census of India, North Barrackpore had a total population of 132,806, of which 66,924 (50%) were males and 65,882 (50%) were females. Population below 6 years was 8,710. The total number of literates in North Barrackpore was 116,524 (93.90% of the population over 6 years).

=== Languages ===
Languages spoken in North barrackpore City (2011)
1. Bengali (82.4%)
2. Hindi (15.2%)
3. Urdu (1.81%)
4. Odia (0.18%)
5. Punjabi (0.11%)
6. Others (0.32%)

As of 2001 India census, North Barrackpur had a population of 123,523. Males constitute 52% of the population and females 48%. North Barrackpur has an average literacy rate of 84%, higher than the national average of 59.5%: male literacy is 87%, and female literacy is 81%. In North Barrackpur, 7% of the population is under 6 years of age.

=== Kolkata Urban Agglomeration ===
The following Municipalities, Census Towns and other locations in Barrackpore subdivision were part of Kolkata Urban Agglomeration in the 2011 census: Kanchrapara (M), Jetia (CT), Halisahar (M), Balibhara (CT), Naihati (M), Bhatpara (M), Kaugachhi (CT), Garshyamnagar (CT), Garulia (M), Ichhapur Defence Estate (CT), North Barrackpur (M), Barrackpur Cantonment (CB), Barrackpore (M), Jafarpur (CT), Ruiya (CT), Titagarh (M), Khardaha (M), Bandipur (CT), Panihati (M), Muragachha (CT) New Barrackpore (M), Chandpur (CT), Talbandha (CT), Patulia (CT), Kamarhati (M), Baranagar (M), South Dumdum (M), North Dumdum (M), Dum Dum (M), Noapara (CT), Babanpur (CT), Teghari (CT), Nanna (OG), Chakla (OG), Srotribati (OG) and Panpur (OG).

== Infrastructure ==
As per the District Census Handbook 2011, North Barrackpur Municipal city covered an area of 12.61 km^{2}. Amongst the civic amenities it had 208 km of roads and open drains. Amongst the medical facilities the nearest maternity home was 2.5 km away, 1 nursing home and certain other medical facilities (without beds) were also available 2.5 km away. It had 1 veterinary hospital and 5 medicine shops. Amongst the educational facilities it had 52 primary schools, 19 middle and secondary schools and 3 non-formal education centres. Amongst the social, recreational and cultural facilities it had 1 auditorium/ community hall, 4 public libraries and 4 reading rooms. Amongst the commodities manufactured were bakery products, spices and soya beans. It had 6 bank branches. Barrackpore is 3 km away.

According to the North Barrackpore Municipality, amongst the educational facilities there are 42 primary schools, 19 secondary schools, 9 higher secondary schools and 1 college. Amongst the medical facilities there 2 hospitals, 4 health centres and 9 sub-centres. There are 6 markets (including 2 under defense area). There is 1 community hall (Gosto Mandap). 21,711 holdings had water connection. There are 4,120 street lights (CESC – 3,025 and WBSEB – 1,095) and 513 street taps.

See also Cities and towns in Barrackpore subdivision

== Economy ==
=== Indira Gandhi Water Works ===
Palta Water Works, rechristened Indira Gandhi Water Treatment Plant, was the first intake point of water for Kolkata, established 1864-1870, spread over 480 acres at Palta. It was expanded in 1888-1893, 1905, 1920, 1936, 1952 and 1968. The total daily potable water supply is 1,35 crore litres(1350 mi.) or 960 lakh(96 mi.) gallons. It feeds 212,000 domestic connections plus commercial connections in Kolkata. The distance between Indira Gandhi Water Treatment Plant and the pumping station at Tala is 22 km.

=== KMDA ===
North Barrackpur Municipality is included in the Kolkata Metropolitan Area for which the KMDA is the statutory planning and development authority.

== Transport ==
State Highway 1 (locally known as Ghoshpara Road or Barrackpore-Palta Road) passes through North Barrackpur.

Palta railway station and Ichhapur railway station on the Sealdah-Ranaghat line are located in North Barrackpur municipal area. While Palta is 25 km from Sealdah Station, Ichhapur is 27 km. It is part of the Kolkata Suburban Railway system.

Nawabganj Ferry Ghat links to Champdani Ferry Ghat at Champdani across the Hooghly. Debitala Ferry Ghat links to Gourhati Ferry Ghat at Angus/ Bhadreswar.

=== Commuters ===
Around a total of 32 lakh people from all around the city commute to Kolkata daily for work. In the Sealdah-Krishnanagar section there are 34 trains that carry commuters from 30 railway stations. In the Seadah-Shantipur section 32 trains carry commuters from 29 stations.

== Education ==
P.N. Das College was established at PO Bengal Enamel, Palta in 1962. It has around 1,700 students. Mahadevananda Mahavidyalaya is a degree college situated in Monirampore area was established on 15 August 1968.

== Healthcare ==
North 24 Parganas district has been identified as one of the areas where ground water is affected by arsenic contamination.
