= Garulia =

- City
- Location in West Bengal, India Garulia (India)
- Coordinates: 22.82°N 88.37°E
- Country: India
- State: West Bengal
- Division: Presidency
- District: North 24 Parganas

Government
  - Type: Municipality
  - Body: Garulia Municipality
  - Chairman: Sanjay Singh

Area
  - Total: 6.47 km^{2} (2.50 sq mi)
- Elevation: 13 m (43 ft)

Population (2011)
  - Total: 85,336
  - Density: 13,200/km^{2} (34,200/sq mi)

Languages
  - Official: Bengali, English
- Time zone: UTC+5:30 (IST)
- PIN: 743133
- Telephone code: +91 33
- ISO 3166 code: IN-WB
- Vehicle registration: WB
- Lok Sabha constituency: Barrackpore
- Vidhan Sabha constituency: Noapara
- Website: north24parganas.nic.in

Garulia is a city and a municipality of North 24 Parganas district in the Indian state of West Bengal. It is a part of the area covered by Kolkata Metropolitan Development Authority (KMDA).

== History ==
Garulia Municipality was established in 1869.

== Geography ==
Cities and towns in the northern portion of Barrackpore subdivision in North 24 Parganas district
M: municipal city/ town, CT: census town,
N: neighbourhood, OG: outgrowth
Owing to space constraints in the small map, the actual locations in a larger map may vary slightly

=== Location ===
Garulia is located at 22.82°N 88.37°E. It has an average elevation of 13 metres (43 ft).

Inhabitants are Hindus, Muslims and others. It is mainly Bengali Localated Area but local Biharis also live here in great amount. There are ferry services which continue until midnight.

Garulia is bounded by Bhatpara on the north, Garshyamnagar and Noapara on the east, North Barrackpur on the south and the Hooghly River on the west.

96% of the population of Barrackpore subdivision (partly presented in the map alongside) lives in urban areas. In 2011, it had a density of population of 10,967 per km^{2} The subdivision has 16 municipalities and 24 census towns.

For most of the cities/ towns information regarding density of population is available in the Infobox. Population data is not available for neighbourhoods. It is available for the entire municipal area and thereafter ward-wise.

All places marked on the map are linked in the full-screen map.

=== Police station ===
Noapara police station under Barrackpore Police Commissionerate has jurisdiction over Garulia and North Barrackpur Municipal areas.

=== Post Office ===
Garulia has a delivery sub post office, with PIN 743133 in the North Presidency Division of North 24 Parganas district in Calcutta region. The only other post offices with the same PIN is Pinkal.

== Demographics ==
=== Population ===
Historical population
Year	Pop.	±%
1901	7,375	—
1911	11,580	+57.0%
1921	13,096	+13.1%
1931	14,033	+7.2%
1941	20,150	+43.6%
1951	28,304	+40.5%
1961	29,041	+2.6%
1971	44,271	+52.4%
1981	57,061	+28.9%
1991	80,918	+41.8%
2001	79,926	−1.2%
2011	85,336	+6.8%
Source: Census of India

As per the 2011 Census of India, Garulia had a total population of 85,336, of which 44,825 (53%) were males and 40,511 (47%) were females. Population below 6 years was 7,247. The total number of literates in Garulia was 67,835 (86.87% of the population over 6 years).

As of 2001 India census, Garulia had a population of 76,309. Males constituted 53% of the population and females 47%. Garulia had an average literacy rate of 73%, higher than the national average of 59.5%: male literacy was 79%, and female literacy was 67%, and 10% of the population was under six years of age.

=== Kolkata Urban Agglomeration ===
The following Municipalities, Census Towns and other locations in Barrackpore subdivision were part of Kolkata Urban Agglomeration in the 2011 census: Kanchrapara (M), Jetia (CT), Halisahar (M), Balibhara (CT), Naihati (M), Bhatpara (M), Kaugachhi (CT), Garshyamnagar (CT), Garulia (M), Ichhapur Defence Estate (CT), North Barrackpur (M), Barrackpur Cantonment (CB), Barrackpore (M), Jafarpur (CT), Ruiya (CT), Titagarh (M), Khardaha (M), Bandipur (CT), Panihati (M), Muragachha (CT) New Barrackpore (M), Chandpur (CT), Talbandha (CT), Patulia (CT), Kamarhati (M), Baranagar (M), South Dumdum (M), North Dumdum (M), Dum Dum (M), Noapara (CT), Babanpur (CT), Teghari (CT), Nanna (OG), Chakla (OG) Srotribati (OG) and Panpur (OG).

=== Languages ===
Languages spoken in Garulia Town (2011)
1. Bengali (49.6%)
2. Hindi (37.3%)
3. Urdu (11.1%)
4. Telugu (0.99%)
5. Bhojpuri (0.53%)
6. Others (0.41%)

== Infrastructure ==
As per the District Census Handbook 2011, Garulia Municipal town covered an area of 6.47 km^{2}. Amongst the civic amenities it had 51 km of roads and both open and closed drains. Amongst the educational facilities It had 28 primary schools, 5 secondary schools, 2 senior secondary schools and 5 non-formal education centres. Amongst the social, recreational and cultural facilities it had 1 public library and 3 reading rooms. Amongst the commodities manufactured were cotton, jute and rakhi. It had 3 bank branches.

According to the Barrackpore administration, amongst the educational facilities in Garulia municipality there are 20 primary schools and 6 higher secondary schools. Amongst the other facilities there are 3 nursing homes, 3 markets, 2 ferry ghats (Babughat and Kangalighat), 1 burning ghat (Ratneswar Burning Ghat) and 2 Muslim burial grounds.7,000 houses have water connection and there are around 150 street taps.

See also Cities and towns in Barrackpore subdivision

== Economy ==
=== Industry ===
Big mills in Garulia are Sree Gouri Sankar Jute Mill Pvt. Ltd., Sree Annapurna Cotton Mills and Sonali Manufacturer Industries.

=== KMDA ===
Garulia Municipality is included in the Kolkata Metropolitan Area for which the KMDA is the statutory planning and development authority.

== Arsenic contamination ==
North 24 Parganas district has been identified as one of the areas where ground water is affected by arsenic contamination.
