= Muragachha =

- Census Town
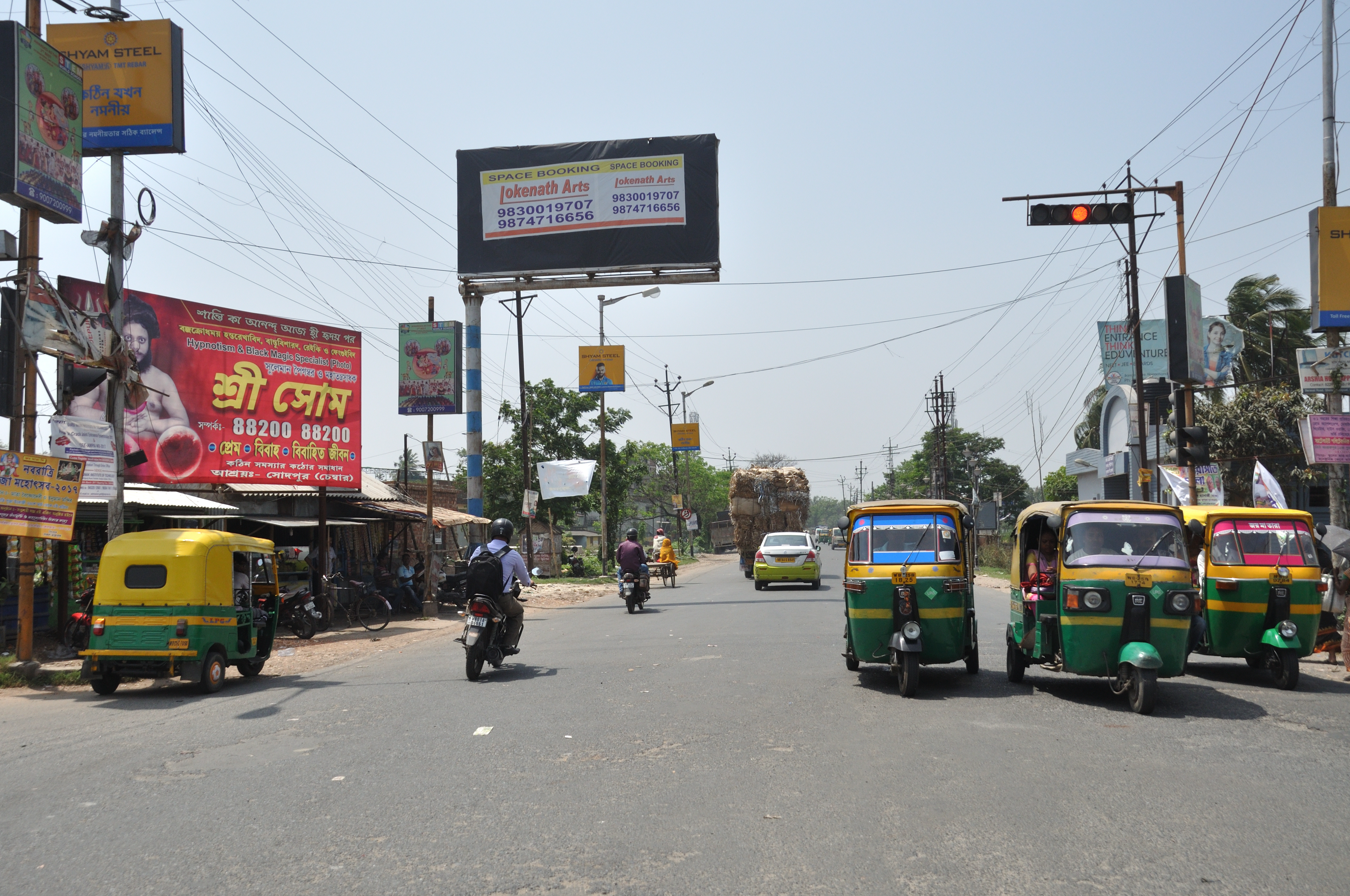
- Sodepur-Barasat Road and Kalyani Expressway Junction, Muragachha

- Location in West Bengal, India Muragachha (India)
- Coordinates: 22.696°N 88.420°E
- Country: India
- State: West Bengal
- District: North 24 Parganas

Area
  - Total: 1.21 km^{2} (0.47 sq mi)
- Elevation: 11 m (36 ft)

Population (2011)
  - Total: 13,249
  - Density: 10,900/km^{2} (28,400/sq mi)

Languages
  - Official: Bengali, English
- Time zone: UTC+5:30 (IST)
- PIN: 700110
- Telephone code: +91 33
- ISO 3166 code: IN-WB
- Vehicle registration: WB
- Lok Sabha constituency: Dum Dum
- Vidhan Sabha constituency: Khardaha
- Website: north24parganas.nic.in

Muragachha is a census town in Barrackpore II CD Block in Barrackpore subdivision in North 24 Parganas district in the Indian state of West Bengal.

== Geography ==
Cities and towns in the southern portion of Barrackpore subdivision in North 24 Parganas district
M: municipal city/ town, CT: census town,
N: neighbourhood/ administrative location
Owing to space constraints in the small map, the actual locations in a larger map may vary slightly

=== Location ===
Muragachha is located at 22.69°N 88.42°E. It has an average elevation of 11 m (36 ft).

Muragachha, Talbandha, Chandpur and Teghari form a cluster of census towns around/ near the Sodepur-Barasat Road, between Panihati and New Barrackpur.

96% of the population of Barrackpore subdivision (partly presented in the map alongside, all places marked in the map are linked in the full screen map) lives in urban areas. In 2011, it had a density of population of 10,967 per km^{2}. The subdivision has 16 municipalities and 24 census towns.

For most of the cities/ towns information regarding density of population is available in the Infobox. Population data is not available for neighbourhoods. It is available for the entire municipal area and thereafter ward-wise.

=== Police station ===
Khardaha police station under Barrackpore Police Commissionerate has jurisdiction over Khardaha municipal area and Barrackpore II CD Block.

== Demographics ==
=== Population ===
As per 2011 Census of India Muragachha had a total population of 13,249, of which 6,758 (51%) were males and 6,491 (49%) were females. Population below 6 years was 1,242. The total number of literates in Muragachha was 10,063 (83.81% of the population over 6 years).

As of 2001 India census, Muragachha had a population of 9790. Males constitute 51% of the population and females 49%. Muragachha has an average literacy rate of 74%, higher than the national average of 59.5%: male literacy is 79% and female literacy is 68%. In Muragachha, 12% of the population is under 6 years of age.

=== Kolkata Urban Agglomeration ===
The following Municipalities, Census Towns and other locations in Barrackpore subdivision were part of Kolkata Urban Agglomeration in the 2011 census: Kanchrapara (M), Jetia (CT), Halisahar (M), Balibhara (CT), Naihati (M), Bhatpara (M), Kaugachhi (CT), Garshyamnagar (CT), Garulia (M), Ichhapur Defence Estate (CT), North Barrackpur (M), Barrackpur Cantonment (CB), Barrackpore (M), Jafarpur (CT), Ruiya (CT), Titagarh (M), Khardaha (M), Bandipur (CT), Panihati (M), Muragachha (CT) New Barrackpore (M), Chandpur (CT), Talbandha (CT), Patulia (CT), Kamarhati (M), Baranagar (M), South Dumdum (M), North Dumdum (M), Dum Dum (M), Noapara (CT), Babanpur (CT), Teghari (CT), Nanna (OG), Chakla (OG), Srotribati (OG) and Panpur (OG).

== Infrastructure ==
As per the District Census Handbook 2011, Muragachha covered an area of 1.21 km^{2}. Amongst the medical facilities it had were 3 medicine shops. Amongst the educational facilities it had were 2 primary schools, 1 middle school, 1 secondary school and 1 senior secondary school.

== Transport ==
Muragachha is the junction of Kalyani Expressway and Sodepur-Barasat road.

=== Bus ===
==== Private Bus ====
- 214 Sajirhat - Babughat
- DN43 Barasat Checkpost - Dakshineswar

==== WBTC Bus ====
- AC10 Nilganj - Howrah Station

==== Bus Route Without Number ====
- Madhyamgram - Howrah Station
- Barasat [Titumir Bus Terminal] - Dankuni [Housing]

=== Train ===
The nearest railway stations are Madhyamgram railway station on the Sealdah-Bangaon line and Sodepur railway station on the Sealdah-Ranaghat line.

== Healthcare ==
Bilkanda (Teghoria ) primary health centre at Muragachha has 6 beds.

North 24 Parganas district has been identified as one of the areas where ground water is affected by arsenic contamination.
