= Bhatpara =

Bhatpara municipality (ভাটপাড়া পৌরসভা)
- City
- Location in West Bengal, India Bhatpara municipality (ভাটপাড়া পৌরসভা) (India)
- Coordinates: 22.87°N 88.41°E
- Country: India
- State: West Bengal
- Division: Presidency
- District: North 24 Parganas

Government
  - Type: Municipality
  - Body: Bhatpara Municipality
  - Chairman: Reba Raha

Area
  - Total: 34.69 km^{2} (13.39 sq mi)
- Elevation: 12 m (39 ft)

Population (2011)
  - Total: 386,019
  - Density: 11,130/km^{2} (28,820/sq mi)

Languages
  - Official: Bengali
  - Additional official: English
- Time zone: UTC+5:30 (IST)
- PIN: 743123, 743124, 743125, 743126, 743127, 743128, 743129
- Telephone code: +91 33
- Vehicle registration: WB
- Lok Sabha constituency: Barrackpore
- Vidhan Sabha constituency: Bhatpara, Jagatdal
- Website: bhatparamunicipality.in

Bhatpara is a city and a municipality of North 24 Parganas district in the Indian state of West Bengal. It is a part of the area covered by Kolkata Metropolitan Development Authority (KMDA).

== Overview ==
Bhatpara is situated on the bank of Hooghly river. It is known for its rich traditions in the field of Sanskrit learning. The name 'Bhatpara' originates from the ancient name "Bhatta-Palli", where 'Bhatta' denotes the sect of Bramhin Sanskrit pandits and 'palli' denotes locality or village. It is one of the oldest municipalities in West Bengal and it was constituted a municipality in 1899, when it was separated from the Naihati municipality. In the British era and afterwards, it had become an important industrial hub on Hoogly river bank, mainly for the high density of jute processing plants.

== Geography ==
Cities and towns in the northern portion of Barrackpore subdivision in North 24 Parganas district
M: municipal city/ town, CT: census town,
N: neighbourhood, OG: outgrowth
Owing to space constraints in the small map, the actual locations in a larger map may vary slightly

=== Location ===
Bhatpara is located at 22.87°N 88.41°E. It has an average elevation of 12 metres (39 feet). The main town is sandwiched between the Hoogly river in the west and railway track linking Sealdah and Krishnanagar in the east.

Bhatpara is bounded by Naihati and Dogachhia on the north, Panpur, Rambati, Mukundapur, Abhirampur, Keutia, Bidydharpur, Rahuta, Basudevpur and Gurdaha on the east, Kaugachhi, Garshyamnagar and Garulia on the south and the Hooghly on the west. Although not specifically spelled out, it is evident that localities such as Jagatdal, Kankinara, Shyamnagar, Authpur, Milangar and Sahebbagan are neighbourhoods in Bhatpara.

96% of the population of Barrackpore subdivision (partly presented in the map alongside) live in urban areas. In 2011, it had a density of population of 10,967 per km^{2} The subdivision has 16 municipalities and 24 census towns.

For most of the cities/ towns information regarding density of population is available in the Infobox. Population data is not available for neighbourhoods. It is available for the entire municipal area and thereafter ward-wise.

All places marked on the map are linked in the full-screen map.

=== Police station ===
Jagaddal police station under Barrackpore Police Commissionerate has jurisdiction over Bhatpara Municipal area.

=== Post Offices ===
Bhatpara has a delivery sub post office, with PIN 743123 in the North Presidency Division of North 24 Parganas district in Kolkata region. The only other post office with the same PIN is Muktarpur.

ESD M, a delivery sub post office in the Jagatdal area has PIN 743124 in the North Presidency Division of North 24 Parganas district in Kolkata region. There is no other post office with the same PIN.

Jagatdal has a delivery sub post office, with PIN 743125 in the North Presidency Division of North 24 Parganas district in Kolkata region. Other post offices with the same PIN are Golghar and Gupter Bagan.

Kankinara has a delivery sub post office, with PIN 743126 in the North Presidency Division of North 24 Parganas district in Kolkata region. Other post office with the same PIN are Keotia, Kushdanga, Madral, Narayanpur and Padmalavapur.

While Shyamnagar has a delivery sub post office Mulajore has a non-delivery sub post office, both with PIN 743127 in the North Presidency Division of North 24 Parganas district in Kolkata region. Other post offices with the same PIN are Kowgachhi, Paltapara, Feeder Road, Gurdah, Mondalpara and Purbabidhyadharpur.

Athpur has a delivery sub post office, with PIN 743128 in the North Presidency Division of North 24 Parganas district in Kolkata region. There is no other post office with the same PIN.

Fingapara has a delivery sub post office, with PIN 743129 in the North Presidency Division of North 24 Parganas district in Kolkata region. There is no other post office with the same PIN.

=== Weather ===
Bhatpara has hot and humid summer and dry winter, typical of West Bengal. The rainy season is typically from mid-July to mid- or late October. Average temperature during summer can go as high as 38 degree Celsius and in winter the mercury plunges to below 10 degree Celsius. Humidity, in the time of summer, is often above 90% and is the primary reason of discomfort.

== Demographics ==
=== Population ===
Historical population
Year	Pop.	±%
1901	21,540	—
1911	50,414	+134.0%
1921	65,609	+30.1%
1931	84,975	+29.5%
1941	117,044	+37.7%
1951	134,916	+15.3%
1961	147,630	+9.4%
1971	217,504	+47.3%
1981	290,721	+33.7%
1991	339,959	+16.9%
2001	442,633	+30.2%
2011	383,762	−13.3%
Source: Census of India

As per the 2011 Census of India, Bhatpara (municipal area + outgrowth) had a total population of 386,019, of which 204,539 (53%) were males and 181,480 (47%) were females. Population in the age range of 0–6 years was 35,5141. The total number of literates in Bhatpara was 297,161 (84.78% of the population 7 years and over).

As of 2001 India census, Bhatpara had a population of 441,956. Males constituted 55% of the population and females 45%. Bhatpara had an average literacy rate of 72%, higher than the national average of 59.5%; with male literacy of 78% and female literacy of 66%. 9% of the population was under 6 years of age.

=== Migrants ===
The educated, middle-income, and predominantly Bengali populace lives in the old town area.

According to a study carried out by Vidyasagar University, "Most of these industrial units were located in riverine towns. A few of these were old towns inhabited previously by middle-class Bengali 'babus' while others were new towns grown out of agricultural lands... Agriculture in Bengal was more remunerative than work in the jute mills but what the jute mills paid was enough to attract labour from Bihar, Odisha, U.P. first and then from C.P. or even Madras...The industrial 'mohallas' remained as 'ghettos'. There was little or no interconnection or social and cultural contact between the local Bengali population and the millhands. Both lived in their worlds."

=== Kolkata Urban Agglomeration ===
The following Municipalities, Census Towns and other locations in Barrackpore subdivision were part of Kolkata Urban Agglomeration in the 2011 census: Kanchrapara (M), Jetia (CT), Halisahar (M), Balibhara (CT), Naihati (M), Bhatpara (M), Kaugachhi (CT), Garshyamnagar (CT), Garulia (M), Ichhapur Defence Estate (CT), North Barrackpur (M), Barrackpur Cantonment (CB), Barrackpore (M), Jafarpur (CT), Ruiya (CT), Titagarh (M), Khardaha (M), Bandipur (CT), Panihati (M), Muragachha (CT) New Barrackpore (M), Chandpur (CT), Talbandha (CT), Patulia (CT), Kamarhati (M), Baranagar (M), South Dumdum (M), North Dumdum (M), Dum Dum (M), Noapara (CT), Babanpur (CT), Teghari (CT), Nanna (OG), Chakla (OG), Srotribati (OG) and Panpur (OG).

=== Languages ===
Languages spoken in Bhatpara city (2011)
1. Bengali (45.5%)
2. Hindi (41.2%)
3. Urdu (11.7%)
4. Odia (0.40%)
5. bhojpuri (0.60%)
6. Others (1.10%)

== Infrastructure ==
As per the District Census Handbook 2011, Bhatpara (municipality + outgrowth) covered an area of 34.69 km^{2}. Amongst the civic amenities it had 60 km of roads and both open and closed drains. Amongst the medical facilities, it had 32 dispensaries/ health centres, 1 veterinary hospital, 5 charitable hospitals/ nursing homes and 32 medicine shops. Amongst the educational facilities It had 195 primary schools, 11 middle schools, 24 secondary schools, 21 senior secondary schools, 17 non-formal education centres and 1 special school for disabled. Amongst the social, recreational and cultural facilities it had 4 auditorium/ community halls, 23 cinema/theatres, 10 public libraries and 10 reading rooms. Amongst the commodities manufactured were jute, tyre and battery. It had 6 bank branches.

According to the Barrackpore administration, amongst the educational facilities at Bhatpara are 135 primary schools, 10 secondary schools and 35 higher secondary schools. Amongst the other facilities are 11 markets, 3 ferry ghats, 2 cinema halls, 2 auditoriums, 10 play grounds and 2 burning ghats. 27,932 houses had water connections and there were 4,950 street taps.

See also Cities and towns in Barrackpore subdivision

== Economy ==
=== Industry ===
Earlier, a significant portion of the population was engaged in some form of job in the local jute mills. Economic instability related to the jute industry in West Bengal forced many of these mills to be shut down. A large number of people of Bhatpara commute to Kolkata for work and a few are engaged in small personal businesses within the locality. A significant number of people have also moved out of Bhatpara. (see the Demographics section for the rather dramatic tell-tale data).

- The Titagarh Paper Mills were set up at Titagarh and Kakinara in 1882. As of 2017, Titaghur Paper Mills Co. Ltd. is in the process of striking off.
- Nafar Chandra Jute Mills Ltd. was established in 1935 and was recorded as active in 2017. However, it has been going through bad patches. Nafar Chandra Jute Mill was shut down in 2006, rendering around 6,000 workers jobless. Again in 2015, both Nafar Chandra and Kankinara Jute Mills shut down rendering a total of around 9,000 workers jobless.
- Kanknarrah Company Limited was established in 1882 and its jute mill at Kankinarah started producing in 1883. Jardine Henderson were the managing agents. The company was acquired by B.C.Jain Group in 1988. Kankinara Jute Mill suspended work in 2006 and reopened in 2007. Again in 2015, both Nafar Chandra and Kankinara Jute Mills shut down rendering a total of around 9,000 workers jobless.
- Alexandra Jute Mill, under National Jute Manufactures Corporation Limited at Jagatdal is a closed mill. It was closed in 2002.
- Meghna Jute Mill is closed.

There are a number of jute mills in the Bhatpara area (Jagatdal, Kankinara and Shyamnagar) listed by the Jute Commissioner: Alliance Mills, Anglo-India Jute and Textile Industries, Auckland Jute Mill, Jagatdal Jute & Industries, Reliance Jute Mills, Shree Gourishankar Jute Mill and Waverly Jute Mill. These mills are not declared as closed but they do not seem to be in operation. Information about these mills is not readily available.

- Exide Industries Ltd, Shyamnagar situated in Authpur is one of the factories which are in good condition and important setup of storage battery manufacturer Exide

=== KMDA ===
Bhatpara Municipality is included in the Kolkata Metropolitan Area for which the KMDA is the statutory planning and development authority.

== Transport ==
State Highway 1 (locally known as Ghoshpara Road) passes through Bhatpara. Public transport includes auto rickshaws running between Naihati and Bhatpara, cycle rickshaws and bus service (routes 85, 87A etc).

Bhatpara is served by three railway stations on the Sealdah-Ranaghat line. Shyamnagar railway station is 30.2 km from Sealdah railway station, Jagaddal railway station is 33.2 km and Kankinara railway station is 35.1 km. The railway links are part of the Kolkata Suburban Railway system. It is approximately a one-hour train journey from Kolkata to Bhatpara.

It also has boat services to the other bank of Hooghly river, connecting it to Chinsura and Chandannagar.

=== Commuters ===
Around a total of 32 lakh people from all around the city commute to Kolkata daily for work. In the Sealdah-Krishnanagar section there are 34 trains that carry commuters from 30 railway stations. In the Seadah-Shantipur section 32 trains carry commuters from 29 stations.

== Education ==
According to the official website of Barrackpore sub-division, there are 34 higher-secondary, 10 secondary and 135 primary schools within the jurisdiction of Bhatpara Municipality (although not all of them are situated in the main town). Bhatpara High school, being the oldest private primary ,Secondary & higher secondary school education institution 1873 was started by people of Bhatpara, a school, including Bhatpara Amar Krishna Pathsala (1925) has contributed in the development and education of the localities in the region.

Although Bhatpara does not have any college within its territorial boundary, colleges in nearby Naihati Rishi Bankim Chandra Collage Wikipedia ((https://en.wikipedia.org Rishi Bankim Chandra College)) and Barrackpore provide access to higher education for the youth of Bhatpara, Shyamnagar, Kankinara and Jagatdal. Many students go to Kolkata for university and technical education. Some also go to Kalyani because of there being an ITI college for technical education.

== Sports and culture ==
Historically Bhatpara is famous as the abode of prominent Sanskrit pundits and as a seat of learning of ancient Hindu shastra and Vedic texts. That aspect of culture has diminished over time. Bhatpara is famous for its Durgapuja. Although family-based pujas were more common a few decades ago, it has become a community-centric affair in modern times. The youth communities or clubs organise these pujas and due to the sheer number of these clubs, one can find over fifty pujas being arranged within a square kilometre of area. Under Bhatpara Municipality Kankinara is famous for Ganesh Chaturthi and Chatth puja. It is famous for traditional clothes like Punjabi, Sherwani, indo-western dress.

Sahitya Mandir is a West Bengal Government registered and a state-funded public library is situated there.

== Places of interest ==
=== Rupdas Babur Ghat ===
One of the oldest ghats, it belongs to the Mukherjee family. Since almost 100 years back Radhakanta Mukherjee built the ghat in 1908 and dedicated it to his father Late Rupdas Mukherjee on the bank of River Ganga. Apart from that there is a Ganga-basi Ghar (for Antorjali Jatra), Rupeswar Shiv Mandir. The family carries on with their traditional Ratha Jatra which was started in the year of 1912.

=== Bhatpara Gure Bari ===
It is one of the oldest zamindari houses of Bhatpara where an age-old Durga Puja is celebrated.

=== Balaram Sarkar Ghat ===
It is a ghat beside the Ganges. It is the oldest ghat of Bhatpara.

=== Panch Mukhi Hanuman Mandir ===
Just 200 metres from Kankinara Bazar towards the Kankinara Ghat, the Panch Mukhi Hanuman Mandir is located. The evening Arti of lord Hanuman is also famous.

=== Bhatpara Kali Temple ===
It is a temple in this locality, beside the Ganga river and the ghat named Balaram Sarkar Ghat.

=== Panchmandir ===
It is a complex of five temples constructed nearly 400 years ago. Each of the temples were funded by different well-established families. Some portions of these temples were decorated with terracotta art.

=== Aat goli ===
"Aat Goli"(আট গলি= Eight Alleys/Lanes) is an amalgamation of eight different back-alleys connected during municipal renovations. It is notable for being extremely narrow and having eight near-exact 90 degree turns, meandering between 2-storied buildings like a narrow stream through mountains. It connects the "Shetala Mandir" to the Barowari Math.

=== Madral Hanuman Mandir (Madral Mahaveer Mandir) ===
The Idol of god is in lying position, situated at 10 feet below the surface. This temple is located 2.5 km from Kankinara railway station. Along with this a Shiva temple is also situated nearby to it. Vaishnav, Kali, and Vishwakarma temples are also situated nearby to this temple.

=== Ishaque Sardar Masjid ===
The holy place of the local Muslims in Kankinara.

=== Baraipara Jama Masjid ===
Old mosque of the Arya Samaj area. Mostly managed by the local youths.

=== Kankinara Jama Masjid ===
100 years old and the biggest mosque of the Kankinara area. It has a capacity of more than a thousand people.

== Healthcare ==
Bhatpara State General Hospital functions with 119 beds and Bhatpara Matri Mangal Pratisthan has 15 beds. Kakinara has a primary health centre with 6 beds.
