= New Barrackpore =

- City
- Location in West Bengal, India New Barrackpore (India)
- Coordinates: 22.7°N 88.45°E
- Country: India
- State: West Bengal
- Division: Presidency
- District: North 24 Parganas
- Metro Station: New Barrackpore (under construction)
- Railway Station: New Barrackpore

Government
  - Type: Municipality
  - Body: New Barrackpur Municipality
  - Chairperson: Prabir Saha

Area
  - Total: 6.80 km^{2} (2.63 sq mi)

Population (2011)
  - Total: 76,846
  - Density: 11,300/km^{2} (29,300/sq mi)

Languages
  - Official: Bengali, English
- Time zone: UTC+5:30 (IST)
- PIN: 700131
- Telephone code: +91 33
- Vehicle registration: WB-23/WB-24
- Lok Sabha constituency: Dum Dum
- Vidhan Sabha constituency: Dum Dum Uttar
- Website: nbmonline.org

New Barrackpore is a city and a municipality of North 24 Parganas district in the Indian state of West Bengal. It is a part of the area covered by Kolkata Metropolitan Development Authority (KMDA).

== Geography ==
Towns in the southern portion of Barrackpore subdivision in North 24 Parganas district
M: municipal city/ town, CT: census town,
N: neighbourhood
Owing to space constraints in the small map, the actual locations in a larger map may vary slightly

=== Location ===
96% of the population of Barrackpore subdivision (partly presented in the map alongside, all places marked in the map are linked in the full screen map) lives in urban areas. In 2011, it had a density of population of 10,967 per km^{2}. The subdivision has 16 municipalities and 24 census towns. For most of the cities/ towns information regarding density of population is available in the Infobox. Population data is not available for neighbourhoods. It is available for the entire Municipal area and thereafter ward-wise.

=== Police station ===
New Barrackpore police station is under Barrackpore Police Commissionerate has jurisdiction over New Barrackpore Municipal areas.

== Demographics ==
=== Population ===
As per the 2011 Census of India, New Barrackpore had a total population of 76,846, of which 38,239 (50%) were males and 38,607 (50%) were females. Population below 6 years was 5,157. The total number of literates in New Barrackpore was 67,384 (93.99% of the population over 6 years).Hindus form almost 99% of the total population.

As of the 2001 Indian census, New Barrackpore had a population of 83,183. Males constitute 50% of the population and females 50%. In New Barrackpore, 7% of the population is under 6 years of age. The literacy rate is 95.19% where the male literacy rate is 97.66% and female literacy rate is 92.72%.

=== Languages ===
Languages spoken in New Barrackpore City (2011)
1. Bengali (99.2%)
2. Hindi (0.70%)
3. Odia (0.03%)
4. Tamil (0.01%)
5. Punjabi (0.01%)
6. Others (0.07%)

=== Kolkata Urban Agglomeration ===
The following Municipalities, Census Towns and other locations in Barrackpore subdivision were part of Kolkata Urban Agglomeration in the 2011 census: Kanchrapara (M), Jetia (CT), Halisahar (M), Balibhara (CT), Naihati (M), Bhatpara (M), Kaugachhi (CT), Garshyamnagar (CT), Garulia (M), Ichhapur Defence Estate (CT), North Barrackpur (M), Barrackpur Cantonment (CB), Barrackpore (M), Jafarpur (CT), Ruiya (CT), Titagarh (M), Khardaha (M), Bandipur (CT), Panihati (M), Muragachha (CT) New Barrackpore (M), Chandpur (CT), Talbandha (CT), Patulia (CT), Kamarhati (M), Baranagar (M), South Dumdum (M), North Dumdum (M), Dum Dum (M), Noapara (CT), Babanpur (CT), Teghari (CT), Nanna (OG), Chakla (OG), Srotribati (OG) and Panpur (OG).

== Infrastructure ==
As per the District Census Handbook 2011, New Barrackpore Municipal town covered an area of 6.89 km^{2}. Amongst the civic amenities it had 120.51 km of roads and open drains. Amongst the educational facilities It had 60 primary schools, 11 middle schools, 10 secondary schools, 8 senior secondary schools, 2 degree colleges in arts/science/commerce and 10 non-formal education centres. Amongst the social, recreational and cultural facilities it had 1 cinema/theatre, 2 auditorium/ community halls, 4 public libraries and 1 reading room. Amongst the commodities manufactured were foam bags, gloves and musical instruments. It had 4 bank branches.

See also Cities and towns in Barrackpore subdivision

== Economy ==
=== KMDA ===
New Barrackpore Municipality is included in the Kolkata Metropolitan Area for which the Kolkata Metropolitan Development Authority is the statutory planning and development authority.

== Transport ==
=== Road ===
New Barrackpore town is situated near Jessore Road/National Highway 12. The bus stop near New Barrackpore on Jessore Road is B.T. College and many buses pass through here. The only bus (Mini bus) that enters into New Barrackpore is S175 (New Barrackpore railway station - Howrah Station).

=== Train ===
New Barrackpore railway station, which is on the Sealdah-Bangaon line, is 17 km from Sealdah railway station. It is part of the Kolkata Suburban Railway system.

=== Air ===
Dumdum/Kolkata Airport is only 5 kilometres away from New Barrackpore.

== Education ==
New Barrackpore has three colleges which are G.C.M. College of Education, Acharya Prafulla Chandra College, Acharya Prafulla Chandra College for Commerce.

The higher secondary schools for boys are New Barrackpore Colony Boys High School, Masunda Boys High School, Kodalia Boys High School, Sahara Boys High School, Satin Sen Nagar Boys High School.

The higher secondary schools for girls are New Barrackpore Colony Girls High School, Masunda Girls High School, Tapati Balika Vidhyabithi, Sahara Girls High School.

== Culture ==
New Barrackpore hosts 'Pushpa Mela' (meaning 'flower fair' in bengali) every winter with many collections of florists. Kristi is a community auditorium where cultural events are often held.

== Temples ==
Choto Bottala Kali Temples is very popular among the locals. Maa Samsan Kali Temple at Sajirhat is also attended by many devotees. A Kali temple made by Mr. Haripada Biswas attached to New Barrackpore Colony Girl's High School (formerly known Kalibari School) is also well known among many.
