= Kalyani Expressway =

Expressway in West Bengal, India

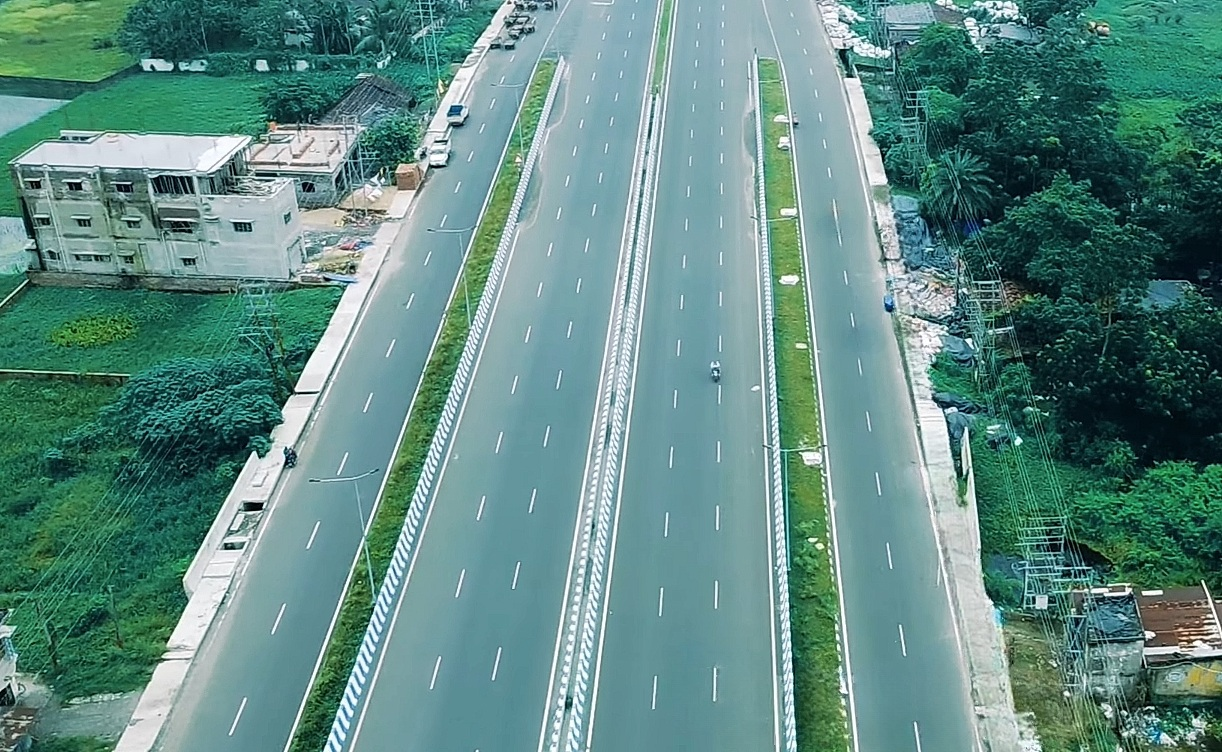

Route information
- Maintained by Kolkata Metropolitan Development Authority
- Length: 44.17 km (27.45 mi)

Major junctions
- South end: Nimta, Kolkata
- Barasat Road in Sodepur; Nilgunj Road in Khardaha; State Highway 2 in Barrackpore; Kakinara - Rafipur Road in Kankinara; Naihati - Habra Road in Naihati; Halisahar - Malancha Road in Halisahar; Kanchrapara - Haringhata Road in Kanchrapara; State Highway 1 in Kalyani
- North end: Bansberia, Hooghly district

Location
- Country: India
- States: West Bengal
- Districts: Hooghly district, Nadia district, North 24 Parganas district

Highway system
- Roads in India; Expressways; National; State; Asian

Kalyani Expressway (Bengali: কল্যাণী মহাসড়ক) is a 44.17-kilometre-long (27.45 mi), 6-laned, tolled expressway in the state of West Bengal, India. It connects Kolkata with its satellite city Kalyani and declared as an expressway by Government of West Bengal. The road starts from Belghoria Expressway in Nimta More, Kolkata and ends in Bansberia of Hooghly district. The main carriageway has 6 lanes (except some low traffic areas where it has 4 lanes) and along with 2 service lanes each side. The road is developed by West Bengal Highway Development Corporation.

== Route ==
The road serves as a faster connection between Kolkata and its northern suburbs in the Kolkata metropolitan region, including Sodepur, Barrackpore, Naihati, Kanchrapara and Kalyani. The road acts an alternative to the Barrackpore Trunk Road and significantly brought down the communication time between the cities from 2 hours to 40 minutes. The road has important interchanges with feeder roads to all the northern suburbs like Belgharia, Sodepur, Barasat, Madhyamgram, Barrackpore, Shyamnagar, Naihati and Kanchrapara, apart from roads which connects other small towns and localities on the way. The road has interchanges with State Highway 1 and State Highway 2 at different places. An extension of this expressway from 'Kampa More' connects it to National Highway 12 through a 6-kilometer-long,6-lane elevated corridor. Additionally, a 6-lane extradosed cable-stayed bridge named 'Second Ishwar Gupta Setu' is being built on the expressway between Kalyani and Bansberia over the Hooghly River, which will be the 5th bridge over the Hooghly River in the Kolkata metropolitan region.

== Cities and towns ==
- North Dum Dum
- Muragachha
- Titagarh
- Barrackpore
- Shyamnagar
- Naihati
- Kankinara
- Halisahar
- Kanchrapara
- Kalyani
- Bansberia
