= Dogachhia, West Bengal =

Dogachhia
- Census Town
- Location in West Bengal, India Dogachhia (India)
- Coordinates: 22.8752°N 88.4363°E
- Country: India
- State: West Bengal
- District: North 24 Parganas

Area
  - Total: 2.20 km^{2} (0.85 sq mi)

Population (2011)
  - Total: 5,705
  - Density: 2,590/km^{2} (6,720/sq mi)

Languages
  - Official: Bengali, English
- Time zone: UTC+5:30 (IST)
- PIN: 743130
- Telephone code: +91 33
- ISO 3166 code: IN-WB
- Vehicle registration: WB
- Lok Sabha constituency: Barrackpore
- Vidhan Sabha constituency: Naihati
- Website: north24parganas.nic.in

Dogachhia is a census town in Barrackpore I CD Block of Barrackpore subdivision in North 24 Parganas district in the Indian state of West Bengal.

== Demographics ==
As of 2011 India census, Dogachhia had a population of 5,705; of this, 2,957 are male, 2,748 female. It has an average literacy rate of 81.68%, higher than the national average of 74.04%.

== Geography ==
Cities and towns in the northern portion of Barrackpore subdivision in North 24 Parganas district
M: municipal city/ town, CT: census town,
N: neighbourhood, OG: outgrowth
Owing to space constraints in the small map, the actual locations in a larger map may vary slightly

=== Location ===
Naihati, Bhatpara and Panpur are located nearby.

96% of the population of Barrackpore subdivision (partly presented in the map alongside) live in urban areas. In 2011, it had a density of population of 10,967 per km^{2} The subdivision has 16 municipalities and 24 census towns.

For most of the cities/ towns information regarding density of population is available in the Infobox. Population data is not available for neighbourhoods. It is available for the entire municipal area and thereafter ward-wise.

All places marked on the map are linked in the full-screen map.

=== Police station ===
Naihati police station under Barrackpore Police Commissionerate has jurisdiction over Naihati municipal area and Barrackpore I CD Block, including Barrackpur Cantonment Board.

=== Post Office ===
Dogachhia has a delivery sub post office, with PIN 743130 in the North Presidency Division of North 24 Parganas district in Calcutta region. There is no other post office with the same PIN.

== Healthcare ==
North 24 Parganas district has been identified as one of the areas where ground water is affected by arsenic contamination.

== Infrastructure ==
As per the District Census Handbook 2011, Dogachhia covered an area of 2.2037 km^{2}. Amongst the medical facilities it had were 8 medicine shops. Amongst the educational facilities It had were 4 primary schools, 1 middle school and 1 secondary school. The nearest senior secondary school was available 5 km away at Naihati.

== Transport ==
Dogachhia is beside Kalyani Expressway.

Naihati Junction railway station on the Sealdah-Ranaghat line is located nearby.
