= Kumarpara, Dum Dum =

Kumarpara
- Neighbourhood
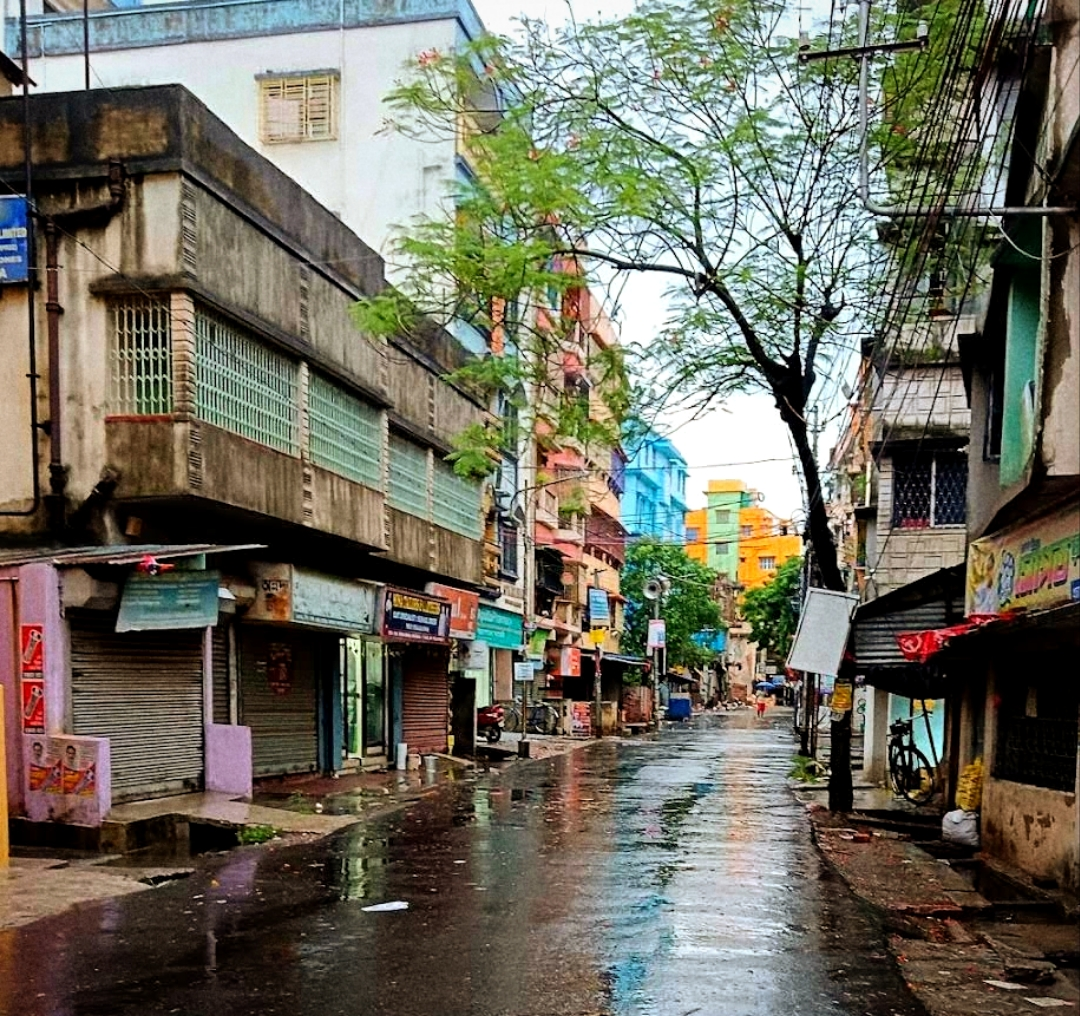
- P.K Guha Rd, Kumarpara

- Location in Kolkata Kumarpara (West Bengal) Kumarpara (India)
- Coordinates: 22.6430°N 88.4195°E
- Country: India
- State: West Bengal
- Division: Presidency
- District: North 24 Parganas
- Metro Station: Dum Dum Cantonment
- Railway Station: Dum Dum Cantonment

Government
  - Type: Municipality
  - Body: Dum Dum Municipality

Languages
  - Official: Bengali, English
- Time zone: UTC+5:30 (IST)
- PIN: 700028
- Telephone code: +91 33
- Vehicle registration: WB
- Lok Sabha constituency: Dum Dum
- Vidhan Sabha constituency: Dum Dum

Kumarpara is a neighbourhood in Dum Dum of North 24 Parganas district in the Indian state of West Bengal. It is a part of the area covered by Kolkata Metropolitan Development Authority (KMDA). Kumarpara Bazar is one of the ideal local markets in the Dum Dum Cantonment area. Adjoined localities are Nalta and Italgacha.

== Geography ==
=== Post office ===
Dum Dum has a delivery Head post office, with PIN 700028 in the Kolkata North Division of Kolkata district in Calcutta region. Other post offices with the same PIN are Kumarpara, Ordnance Factory, Kamalapur and Rajabagan.

=== Police station ===
Dum Dum police station under Barrackpore Police Commissionerate has jurisdiction over Kumarpara areas.

== Landmarks ==
- Kumarpara Bazar
- Kumarpara Rickshaw Stand
- Kumarpara Post office

== Transport ==
=== Railways ===
Dum Dum Cantonment railway station on the Sealdah-Bangaon line is situated nearby.

=== Metro ===
Dum Dum Cantonment metro station of Yellow Line is situated nearby.

=== Bus ===
Bus route number 30D serves the area which runs from Dum Dum Cantonment to Babughat.

=== Air ===
Netaji Subhash Chandra Bose International Airport is just 3.9 Km away from Dum Dum Cantonment.
