= Shyamnagar, West Bengal =

Shyamnagar
- Locality
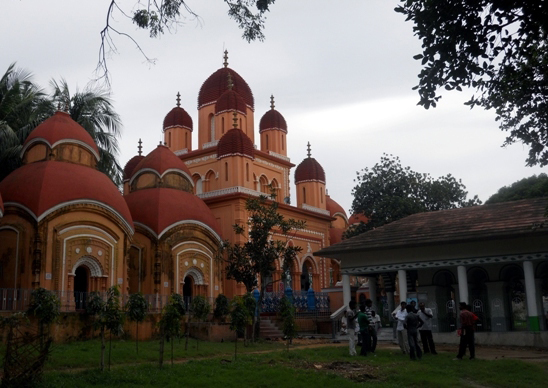
- Mulajore Kalibari, Shyamnagar

- Location in West Bengal, India Shyamnagar (India)
- Coordinates: 22.8365°N 88.3956°E
- Country: India
- State: West Bengal
- Division: Presidency
- District: North 24 Parganas

Government
  - Type: Municipality
  - Body: Bhatpara Municipality
- Elevation: 2 m (6.6 ft)

Languages
  - Official: Bengali, Hindi, English
- Time zone: UTC+5:30 (IST)
- PIN: 743127
- Telephone code: +91 33
- ISO 3166 code: IN-WB
- Vehicle registration: WB
- Lok Sabha constituency: Barrackpore
- Vidhan Sabha constituency: Jagaddal

Shyamnagar is a locality in Bhatpara of North 24 Parganas district in the Indian state of West Bengal. It is a part of the area covered by Kolkata Metropolitan Development Authority (KMDA).

== Geography ==
Cities and towns in the northern portion of Barrackpore subdivision in North 24 Parganas district
M: municipal city/ town, CT: census town,
N: neighbourhood, OG: outgrowth
Owing to space constraints in the small map, the actual locations in a larger map may vary slightly

=== Location ===
Shyamnagar is located at 22.83°N 88.37°E in the Ganges Delta at an average elevation of 2 m (6.6 ft). It is spread linearly along the banks of the River Hooghly in a north – south direction. Much of the city was originally a vast wetland, reclaimed over the decades to accommodate the city's burgeoning population. The remaining wetland, known as East Calcutta Wetlands has been designated a "wetland of international importance" under the Ramsar Convention.

96% of the population of Barrackpore subdivision (partly presented in the adjoining map) live in urban areas. In 2011, it had a population density of 10,967 per km^{2}. The subdivision has 16 municipalities and 24 census towns.

For most of the cities/ towns information regarding density of population is available in the Infobox. Population data is not available for neighbourhoods. It is available for the entire municipal area and thereafter ward-wise.

All places marked on the map are linked in the full-screen map.

=== Physical features ===
Like most of the Indo-Gangetic Plain, the predominant soil and water type is alluvial. Quaternary sediments consisting of clay, silt, various grades of sand and gravel underlie the city. These sediments are sandwiched between two clay beds, the lower one at depths between 250 m (820 ft) and 650 m (2,133 ft) and the upper one ranging between 10 m (33 ft) and 40 m (131 ft) in thickness. According to the Bureau of Indian Standards, the town falls under seismic zone-III, in a scale of I to V (in order of increasing proneness to earthquakes) while the wind and cyclone zoning is "very high damage risk", according to UNDP report.

=== Police station ===
Jagaddal police station under Barrackpore Police Commissionerate has jurisdiction over Bhatpara Municipal area.

=== Post Office ===
While Shyamnagar has a delivery sub post office Mulajore has a non-delivery sub post office, both with PIN 743127 in the North Presidency Division of North 24 Parganas district in Calcutta region. Other post offices with the same PIN are Kowgachhi, Paltapara, Feeder Road, Gurdah, Mondalpara and Purbabidyadharpur.

== Demographics ==
Besides the original historic Bengali population of the town, Shyamnagar has for centuries been inhabited by a large number of people who migrated here (and a few other places in West Bengal) starting in late nineteenth centuries when the establishment of the jute mills along the bank of Ganges drew in a large labor force from the neighboring states of Bihar and Orissa, as well as eastern Uttar Pradesh. Quite frequently throughout the township, the migrant population formed an overwhelming majority of the population of the local areas --- mainly surrounding the shanty towns and bustees dotting the mills. Lately, a sizeable portion of the youths are found to be engaged in business with the foreign and Indian Multinational companies who are opening their offices in the Salt Lake and Rajarhat area of Kolkata.

== History ==
The name of Shyamngar came from a folk etymology of Samne+ garh (সামনে+ গঢ়), which in course of time changed to Shyamnagar.

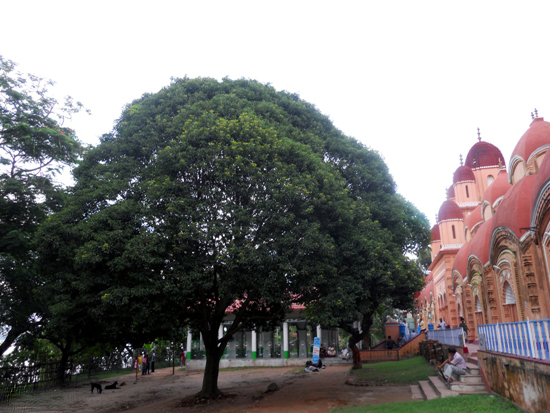
Great Banyan Tree with Mulajore Kalibari

During the rule of Raja Krishnachandra Roy of Krishnanagar, the king gave the village called 'Mulajore' --- along with an honorary title of Ray Gunakar --- to his court poet, the great Bharatchandra Ray. The historic Bharat Chandra Library, was established in 1906 and named so in remembrance of Bharat Chandra Ray Gunakar. The library is situated in close proximity to the Shyamnagar railway station.

Relatives of Nobel laureate Rabindranath Tagore had set up Mulajor Kalibari at Shyamnagar in North 24 Parganas --- a historical fact relatively unknown to most of the populace. The ancient Kali temple on the bank of the Hooghly River is eye soothing. One of the priests here said the temple was constructed beside Hooghly River on 31 Baishakh in 1219 Bengali year --- around 200 years ago, and even before the famous Dakhineswar Kali temple was set up by Rani Rashmoni Devi. Currently, six priests are engaged for offering puja to goddess Kali and one of the temple priests said "No dedicated book has been written on this temple and gradually history is fading away; but we know relatives of Rabindranath Tagore constructed this temple".

Srijit Thakur, from the Rajbari at Pathuriaghata Street near Natunbazar in Kolkata, is one of the few surviving member of the Thakur family whose ancestors set up the temple. According to the biographer of Rabindranath Tagore, Prabhat Kumar Mukhopadhyaya, the original surname of the Tagores was Kushari. They were Rarhi Brahmins and originally belonged to a village named Kush in the district named Burdwan in West Bengal. Rabindranath Tagore's ancestor Dinanath Kushari, the son of Bhatta Narayana was a native of this village. Generations later different branches of the Kusharis migrated to different parts of Bengal; one of the branches migrated to Jessore District and settled there. One of the descendants Panchanan Kushari later came back from Jessore District in East Bengal to West Bengal and settled in Gobindopur. "Panchanan got the title thakur, and since then his family member used to write the title Thakur instead of Kusari" --- as one of the priests said. Jairam Thakur (Kusari) from latter generation had four sons --- Anandiram, Nilmoni, Darpanarayan, and Gobindaram. Prince Dwarkanath Tagore was the next generation of Anandiram. Dwarakanath's son was Debendranath, and Rabindranath was Debendranath's eighth son. Debendranath, as a matter of fact, became Brahmo and did not believe in idol worshipping. It had not been known whether he or his sons ever visited the Kali temple in Shyamnagar --- founded by Gopimohan Thakur, son of Darpanarayan. Gopimohan had two sons, Prsanna Kumar and Harakumar, and a daughter --- Brahmamoyee.

Prasanna Kumar had one son, Pradyot Kumar. Harakumar had a son, Jatindromohan. Surviving member Srijit Thakur is the son of Prabirendro Mohan, who was the son of Pradyot Kumar. According to a local folktale, the land on which the Kali temple was established was traditionally occupied by people of lower social standings, namely, the 'Nandi' (caste) and 'Pirali'; therefore, the dignitaries among the priests from 'Bhatpara tol' (Sanskrit educational institution) used to refuse offering puja to the goddess at Mulajore Shyamnagar Kali temple; as a result, priests had to be hired from Bankura, Burdwan and other places. Later a Sanskrit College was set up by the king Gopimohan Thakur --- for up-lifting of the prestige of the Sanskrit education in the immediate neighborhood. This Sanskrit college has been a matter of pride for generations of the traditional residents of the township. Students were accommodated in the college hostel; they used to take Prasad in the temple for daily meals. Ramkumar Chattopadhyaya, elder brother of Ramakrishna Dev was a student of this college. Unfortunately, instead of reconstructing that dilapidated building, a heritage building of the locality with its Ionic pillars Rabindra Bhawan was set up by municipality --- replacing the college, ignoring the sense of heritage.

== Overview ==
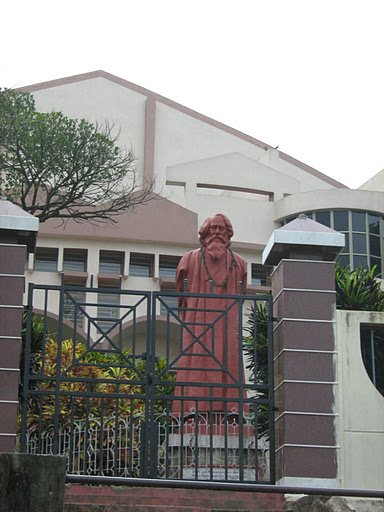
Rabindra Bhavan

Shyamnagar is situated on the eastern bank of the river Ganga. The Kali Temple, Mulajore Kalibari, is situated in between Shyamnagar railway station and Hooghly river. An auditorium named Rabindra Bhavan was built by Bhatpara Municipality by the side of this Kali Temple. It was said that Pandit Vidyasagar used to often visit the temple and the adjoining Sanskrit College. An annual fair called Poush Mela --- a popular festive attraction of the township --- is being organized every year in Pousha Masa according to Bengali calendar (between December and January in the standard Christian calendar). The place becomes holy with the blessings of the goddesses Kali and Ganga. The Shyamnagar Book Fair is being organised by Shubhas Shanga Club Battala every year at the time of Poush Mela at Kalibari area. Other than the Mulajore Kalibari there are three other notable Kali Bari (Kali Temples) situated in Shyamnagar. They are Chowrangi Kalibari, Sidhheswari Kalibari and Rakshakali temple. There is also one Buddhist monastery situated by the railway line.

== Culture ==
Shyamnagar is the birthplace of Pandit Ajoy Chakraborty, a prodigy classical musician of international fame. Shyamnagar is also the residence of Aneek Dhar, a singer who has won and hosted many reality shows focused around singing. Many well known athletes --- such as Subrata Bhattacharya, Kesto Pal, Mahabir Prasad, Asoklal Banerjee, and Sumit Mukherjee --- resided here.

Notable Bengali authors, Troilokyanath Mukhopadhay and Rangalal Mukhopadhay were born here. Bharat Chandra Roy Library is a historic library in this area. It was founded in 1906 by Bankim Chandra Chatterjee.

== Companies and factories ==
=== Exide Industries Limited ===
- Exide's range and scale of manufacturing operations can be matched by few companies in the world. Together, they produce an annual output of 8 Million Units in Automobile batteries (including batteries for motor-cycle applications), and over 600 Million Ampere-Hours of Industrial Power.
- Apart from the conventional Flooded Flat Plate batteries for Automotive application, Exide also produces industrial range of batteries, which includes, Flooded – Flat plate, Flooded – Tubular plate, Flooded – Plante and Sealed Maintenance Free VRLA batteries. Miners' Cap Lamp Batteries are also produced.
- Exide is the only producer of Submarine batteries in India and one of the few in the world.

=== Nicco Corporation Limited – Cable Division ===
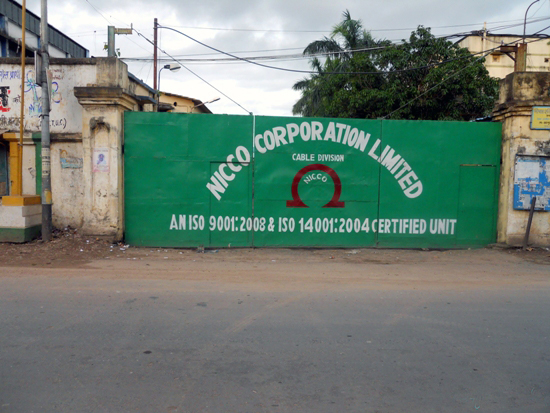
Nicco Corporation Limited – Cable Division – Shyamnagar, an ISO 9001:2008 & 14001:2004 certified unit.

Nicco Corporation Limited – Cable Division, an ISO 9001:2008 & 14001:2004 certified unit, is located on East Ghosh Para Road, Athpur, Shyamnagar, on the banks of river Ganga.

The plant at Shyamnagar produces the following types of cables:-

- Elastomeric cables for host of applications- Mining, Railways, Steel/Power/Petrochem Plants, Shipboard, Heavy Engineering, and Material Handling.
- Large range of specialized cable for Defence (e.g. Water tight cables and buoyant cables).
- Electron Beam Irradiated Cables for a wide range of applications.
- XLPE & PVC power and control cables (including Flame Retardant, Low Smoke, Low Halogen (FRLS & LSZH).
- Zero halogen fire survival category (FS).
- Array of highly specialized Instrumentation, Data Transmission and miniature cables (including Fluoroplastic category).
- Special high temperature conductors (Kapton covered).
- Overhead Grooved conductors for Railway electrification.

=== Ramsarup Industries Limited ===
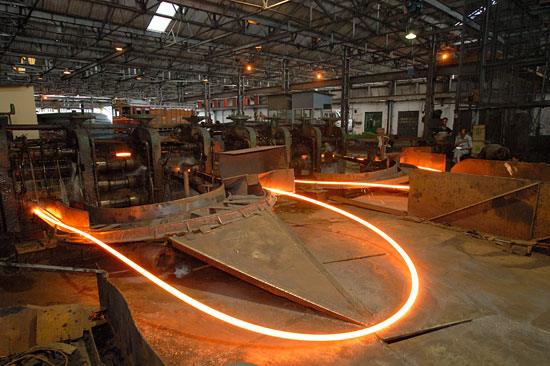
An inside view of Ramsarup Industries Limited, Shyamnagar TMT manufacturing unit

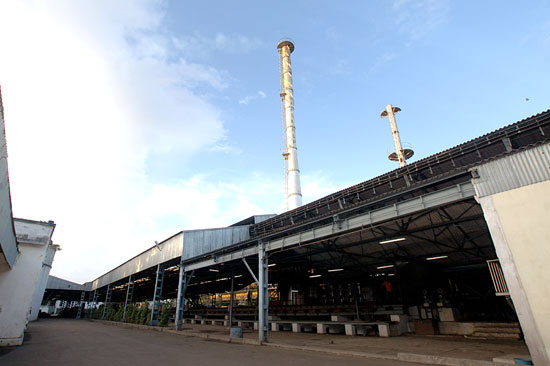
Factory view of Ramsarup Industries Limited, Shyamnagar TMT manufacturing unit

- Ramsarup Industries Limited, an ISO 9001:2000 unit, took over the Steel Division of Nicco Corporation Ltd in August 2002. The above unit is engaged in manufacturing of TMT Bars, Wire Rods and Steel Wires.
- Installed capacity of TMT Bars (Re-inforcement & Debars) – 167000 MTs & Steel Wires – 36000 Mts.
- Only producer in India to provide complete range of 8mm to 40mm Bars using Thermex Technology.
- Supplier to large projects and companies and registered with Contractor of NHPC, NTPC, CPWD, Nuclear Power Corporation etc.

Apart from the above factories, there are other renowned factories:

1. Annapurna Cotton Mills
2. Gouri Shankar Jute Mills
3. Hindustan Lever (Dalda Division) – presently changed the name.

== Transport ==
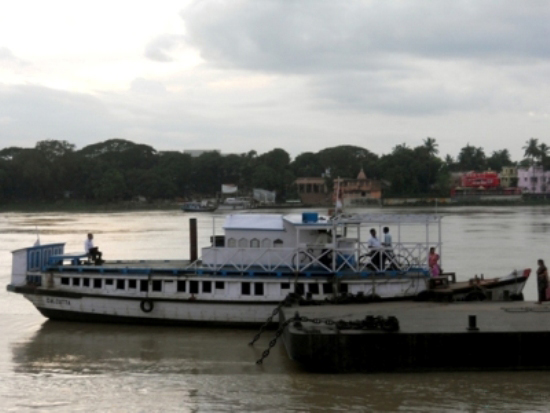
Ferry services in Shyamnagar

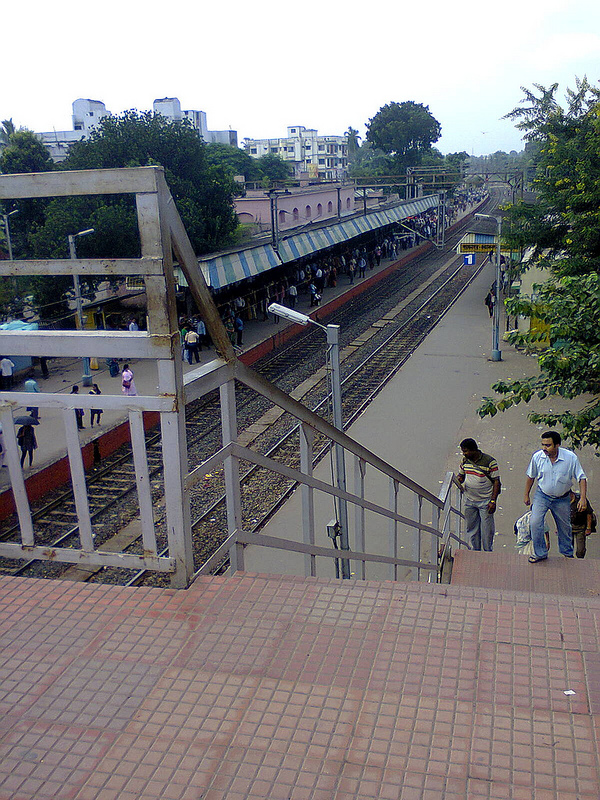
Overbridge of Shyamnagar railway station. Connecting platform number 1 (right hand) to the other three platforms, i.e. 2 (seen on left side), 3 and 4.

=== Trains ===
Local and passenger trains are available every now and then to go to Kolkata, Budge Budge, Katwa, Bardhaman etc. Not only the Sealdah-Ranaghat and Bardhaman locals (via Bandel) but also all of the Sealdah main line trains crosses from the heart of the town as well. The Maitri Express, connecting not just two cities Kolkata to Dhaka but two countries, passes from this town. Not all type of service are available here. Not many school are here but some are good. They are:- 1. Shyamnagar Girls High School 2. Mulajore Sitanath Pathsala 3. Shyamnagar Kantichandra High School, 4. Rishi Aurobindo Vidya Niketan 5. Morning Bell's Academy (High School), 6. St. Augustine's Night School

=== Airport ===
Dum Dum Airport, officially the Netaji Subhash Chandra Bose International Airport, is less than 30 km away and is well connected by roadways.

=== Buses ===
Shyamnagar is served by two major roadways of the district – Ghoshpara Road and Kalyani Expressway. Both of them are well connected to Kolkata, the capital of West Bengal. Notable among the bus services available here are 1. Route no. 85 – a private bus service connecting the historic Kanchrapara to Barrackpore, 2. WBSTC – a government bus service connecting Shyamnagar to Garia (South Kolkata), 3. CSTC – another bus service connecting Shyamnagar to Digha (From Habra Bus Depot).

=== Ferry ===
Regular ferry services are available on river hooghly from Shyamnagar to Telenipara at Amit Nagar (Bhadreshwar, Chandanagore) at a regular interval of 15 minutes.

== Education ==
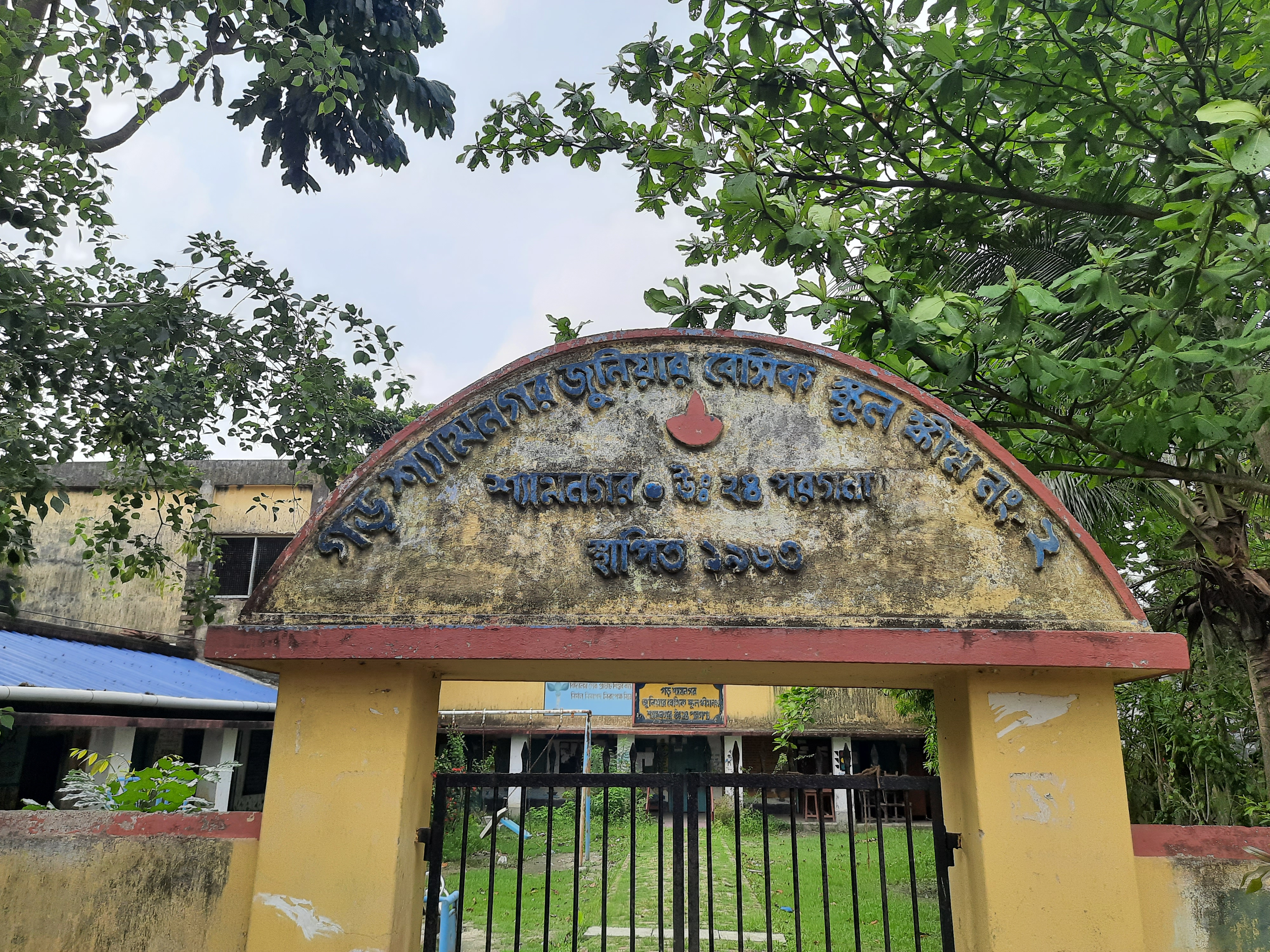
Gar Shyamnagar Junior Basic School

Shyamnagar's education landscape has traditionally been dominated by schools run by the state government, although lately private schools have been established to cater the needs of its dynamic populace. The schools mainly use Bengali or English as the medium of instruction, although Hindi is also used at places. The schools are affiliated with one of the following affiliating bodies — West Bengal Board of Secondary Education, the Indian Certificate of Secondary Education (ICSE), and the National Institute of Open School (NIOS). Under the 10+2+3 plan, after completing their secondary education, students typically enroll in a 2-year junior college (also known as a pre-university) or in schools with a higher secondary facility affiliated to West Bengal Council of Higher Secondary Education, ICSE or CBSE. Students usually choose from one of the three streams — arts, commerce, or science, though vocational streams are also available. Upon completing the required coursework and passing approved examinations conducted by the respective affiliating boards, students achieve eligibility to pursue general or professional undergraduate degree education in colleges throughout India.

List of some Reputed Schools in Shyamnagar:

1. St. Augustine's Day School (Shyamnagar)
2. Morning Bells Academy (High School)
3. Authpur National Model H.S School
4. Shyamnagar Kanti Chandra High School
5. Mulajore Sitanath Pathsala
6. Shyamnagar Balika Vidyalaya (HS)
7. Authpur High (H/S) School at Authpur 1 kilometre away from Shyamnagar. This school was inaugurated by Ishwar Chandara Vidyasagar. Oldest school in Authpur-Shyamnagar locality.
8. Authpur Balika Vidyalaya (HS), Authpur
9. Shyamnagar Rishi Aurobindo Vidyaniketan (Boys)
10. Shyamnagar Rishi Aurobindo Balika Vidyalaya (Girls)
11. Jawaharlal Nehru Smrity Vidya Mandir
12. Mandalpara Vidya Niketan
13. Mandalpara Girls' High School
14. Shree Gouri Shanker Jute Mills High School
15. Swami Vivekananda High school;(vocational education/ civil engineering & Agriculture) x+2 Level
16. Brahmamayee Vidyamandir
17. Shantigarh Nivanani Smriti Vidyapith
18. Harakh Chand Kankaria Jain Vidyalaya
19. Shyama Chandra H.S School
20. Gurdah High School
