= Paltapara =

Paltapara Palta
- Census Town
- Location in West Bengal, India Paltapara (India)
- Coordinates: 22.8083°N 88.3943°E
- Country: India
- State: West Bengal
- District: North 24 Parganas

Area
  - Total: 1.72 km^{2} (0.66 sq mi)

Population (2011)
  - Total: 6,408
  - Density: 3,730/km^{2} (9,650/sq mi)

Languages
  - Official: Bengali, English
- Time zone: UTC+5:30 (IST)
- PIN: 743127
- Telephone code: +91 33
- Vehicle registration: WB
- Lok Sabha constituency: Barrackpore
- Vidhan Sabha constituency: Noapara
- Website: north24parganas.nic.in

Paltapara (also known as Palta) is a census town in Barrackpore I CD Block of Barrackpore subdivision in North 24 Parganas district in the Indian state of West Bengal.

== Geography ==
Cities and towns in the northern portion of Barrackpore subdivision in North 24 Parganas district
M: municipal city/ town, CT: census town,
N: neighbourhood, OG: outgrowth
Owing to space constraints in the small map, the actual locations in a larger map may vary slightly

=== Location ===
Garshyamnagar, Noapara, Kaugachhi and Paltapara form an urban cluster east of Garulia and North Barrackpur. Ichhapur Defence Estate lies on the west of North Barrackpur.

96% of the population of Barrackpore subdivision (partly presented in the map alongside; all places marked on the map are linked in the full-screen map) lives in urban areas. In 2011, it had a density of population of 10,967 per km^{2} The subdivision has 16 municipalities and 24 census towns.

For most of the cities/ towns information regarding density of population is available in the Infobox. Population data is not available for neighbourhoods. It is available for the entire municipal area and thereafter ward-wise.

=== Police station ===
Noapara police station under Barrackpore Police Commissionerate has jurisdiction over Garulia and North Barrackpur municipal areas.

=== Post Office ===
Paltapara has a delivery branch post office, with PIN 743127 in the North Presidency Division of North 24 Parganas district in Calcutta region. Other post offices with the same PIN are Kowgachhi, Mulajore, Shyamnagar, Feeder Road, Gurdah, Mondalpara and Purbabidhyadharpur.

== Demographics ==
As of 2011 India census, Paltapara had a population of 6,408; of this, 3,293 are male, 3,115 female. It has an average literacy rate of 77.62%, higher than the national average of 74.04%.

== Infrastructure ==
As per the District Census Handbook 2011, Paltapara covered an area of 1.7191 km^{2}. Amongst the educational facilities it had were 4 primary schools, the nearest middle school was available 2 km away at Handia, the nearest secondary and senior secondary schools were available 2 km away at Ichhapur.

== Transport ==
Paltapara is beside Kalyani Expressway.

The nearest railway stations are Shyamnagar railway station and Ichhapur railway station on the Sealdah-Ranaghat line.

== Healthcare ==
North 24 Parganas district has been identified as one of the areas where ground water is affected by arsenic contamination.
