= Barrackpore subdivision =

- Subdivision
- Coordinates: 22.76°N 88.37°E
- Country: India
- State: West Bengal
- District: North 24 Parganas
- Headquarters: Barrackpore

Area
  - Total: 335.80 km^{2} (129.65 sq mi)

Population (2011)
  - Total: 3,669,748
  - Density: 10,928/km^{2} (28,304/sq mi)

Languages
  - Official: Bengali, English
- Time zone: UTC+5:30 (IST)
- ISO 3166 code: ISO 3166-2:IN
- Vehicle registration: WB 23 / WB 24
- Website: www.barrackpore.gov.in

Barrackpore subdivision is an administrative subdivision of the North 24 Parganas district in the Indian state of West Bengal.

== History ==
In 1757, the East India Company obtained the zamindari or land-holders rights of the 24 Parganas Zamindari from Mir Jafar, the new Nawab of Bengal. Full proprietary status was handed over to Robert Clive in 1759 by a sanad or deed granting him the 24 Parganas as a jagir. After Clive's death in 1774, full proprietary rights of the 24 Parganas zamindari reverted to the East India Company. In 1814, the district consisted of two parts – the suburbs of Kolkata (referred to as Dihi Panchannagram) and the rest. In 1834, several parganas of Jessore and Nadia were added to the 24 Parganas. The district was divided into two divisions. The Alipore division comprised territories originally ceded to the company and the Barasat division comprised territories added from Jessore and Nadia. The two divisions were replaced by eight subdivisions in 1861 – Diamond Harbour, Baruipur, Alipore, Dum Dum, Barrackpore, Barasat, Basirhat and Satkhira. The Satkhira subdivision was transferred to the newly formed Khulna district in 1882, the Baruipur subdivision was abolished in 1883 and the Dum Dum and Barrackpore subdivisions in 1893. Barrackpore subdivision was reconstituted in 1904 with portions of Barasat and Alipore subdivisions.

== Geography ==
=== Physical features ===
Barrackpore subdivision is part of the North Hooghly Flat, one of the three physiographic regions in the district located in the lower Ganges Delta. The country is flat. It is a little raised above flood level and the highest ground borders the river channels.

== Subdivisions ==

North 24 Parganas district is divided into the following administrative subdivisions:

Subdivision	Headquarters	Area km^{2}	Population (2011)	Urban population % (2011)	Rural Population % (2011)
Bangaon	Bangaon	838.17	1,063,028	16.33	83.67
Barasat Sadar	Barasat	1,002.48	2,789,611	54.67	45.33
Barrackpore	Barrackpore	334.51	3,668,653	96.02	3.98
Bidhannagar	Bidhannagar	33.50	216,609	100.00	0
Basirhat	Basirhat	1,777.02	2,271,880	12.96	87.04
North 24 Parganas district	Barasat	4,094.00	10,009,781	57.27	42.73

== Administrative units ==
Barrackpore subdivision has 16 police stations, 2 community development blocks, 2 panchayat samitis, 14 gram panchayats, 64 mouzas, 53 inhabited villages, 16 municipalities, 24 census towns and 4 outgrowths. The subdivision has its headquarters at Barrackpore.

The municipalities are at Kanchrapara, Halisahar, Naihati, Bhatpara, Garulia, North Barrackpur, Barrackpore, Titagarh, Khardaha, Panihati, New Barrackpore, Kamarhati, Baranagar, Dum Dum, North Dumdum and South Dumdum.

The census towns are: Palladaha, Palashi, Nagdaha, Jetia, Balibhara, Dogachhia, Garshyamnagar, Noapara, Kaugachhi, Paltapara, Ichhapur Defence Estate, Babanpur, Jafarpur, Mohanpur, Telenipara, Chak Kanthalia, Ruiya, Patulia, Bandipur, Talbandha, Bilkanda, Muragachha, Teghari and Chandpur.

== Religion ==
Given below is an overview of the religion-wise break-up of the population across the subdivisions of North 24 Parganas district, as per 2011 census:

Subdivision	Population (2011)	Hindu %	Muslim %	Christian %	Others %
Bangaon	1,063,028	85.63	13.73	0.26	0.38
Barasat Sadar	2,789,611	65.18	34.26	0.16	0.40
Barrackpore	3,668,653	88.61	10.32	0.35	0.71
Bidhannagar	216,609	95.26	2.56	0.45	1.73
Basirhat	2,271,880	51.37	48.37	0.14	0.13
North 24 Parganas district	10,009,781	73.45	25.82	0.24	0.48

North 24 Parganas district with 24.22% Muslims (in 2001) has been identified as a minority concentrated district by the Ministry of Minority Affairs, Government of India. A baseline survey on religious minority population has been carried out under the aegis of Indian Council of Social Science Research and funded by the Ministry of Minority Affairs. For information on the survey see North 24 Parganas: minority concentrated district.

== Population movement ==
North 24 Parganas district is densely populated, mainly because of the influx of refugees from East Pakistan (later Bangladesh). With a density of population of 2,182 per km^{2} in 1971, it was 3rd in terms of density per km^{2} in West Bengal after Kolkata and Howrah, and 20th in India. According to the District Human Development Report: North 24 Parganas, "High density is also explained partly by the rapid growth of urbanization in the district. In 1991, the percentage of urban population in the district has been 51.23".

As per the Refugee Relief and Rehabilitation Department of the Government of West Bengal, the census figures show the number of refugees from East Pakistan in 1971 was nearly 6 million and in 1981, the number was assessed at 8 million. A district-wise break-up in 1971, shows the main thrust of the refugee influx was on 24-Parganas (22.3% of the total refugees), Nadia (20.3%), Bankura (19.1%) and Kolkata (12.9%).

The North 24 Paraganas district has a 352 km long international border with Bangladesh, out of which 160 km is land border and 192 km is riverine border. Only a small portion of the border has been fenced and it is popularly referred to as a porous border. There are reports of Bangladeshi infiltrators. The CD Block pages carry Decadal Population Growth information.

An estimate made in 2000 places the total number of illegal Bangladeshi immigrants in India at 15 million, with around 0.3 million entering every year. While many immigrants have settled in the border areas, some have moved on, even to far way places such as Mumbai and Delhi. The border is guarded by the Border Security Force. During the UPA government, Sriprakash Jaiswal, Union Minister of State for Home Affairs, had made a statement in Parliament on 14 July 2004, that there were 12 million illegal Bangladeshi infiltrators living in India, and West Bengal topped the list with 5.7 million Bangladeshis. More recently, Kiren Rijiju, Minister of State for Home Affairs in the NDA government has put the figure at around 20 million.

== Kolkata Urban Agglomeration ==
The following Municipalities, Census Towns and other locations in Barrackpore subdivision were part of Kolkata Urban Agglomeration in the 2011 census: Kanchrapara (M), Jetia (CT), Halisahar (M), Balibhara (CT), Naihati (M), Bhatpara (M), Kaugachhi (CT), Garshyamnagar (CT), Garulia (M), Ichhapur Defence Estate (CT), North Barrackpur (M), Barrackpur Cantonment (CB), Barrackpore (M), Jafarpur (CT), Ruiya (CT), Titagarh (M), Khardaha (M), Bandipur (CT), Panihati (M), Muragachha (CT) New Barrackpore (M), Chandpur (CT), Talbandha (CT), Patulia (CT), Kamarhati (M), Baranagar (M), South Dumdum (M), North Dumdum (M), Dum Dum (M), Noapara (CT), Babanpur (CT), Teghari (CT), Nanna (OG), Chakla (OG), Srotribati (OG) and Panpur (OG).

== Police stations ==
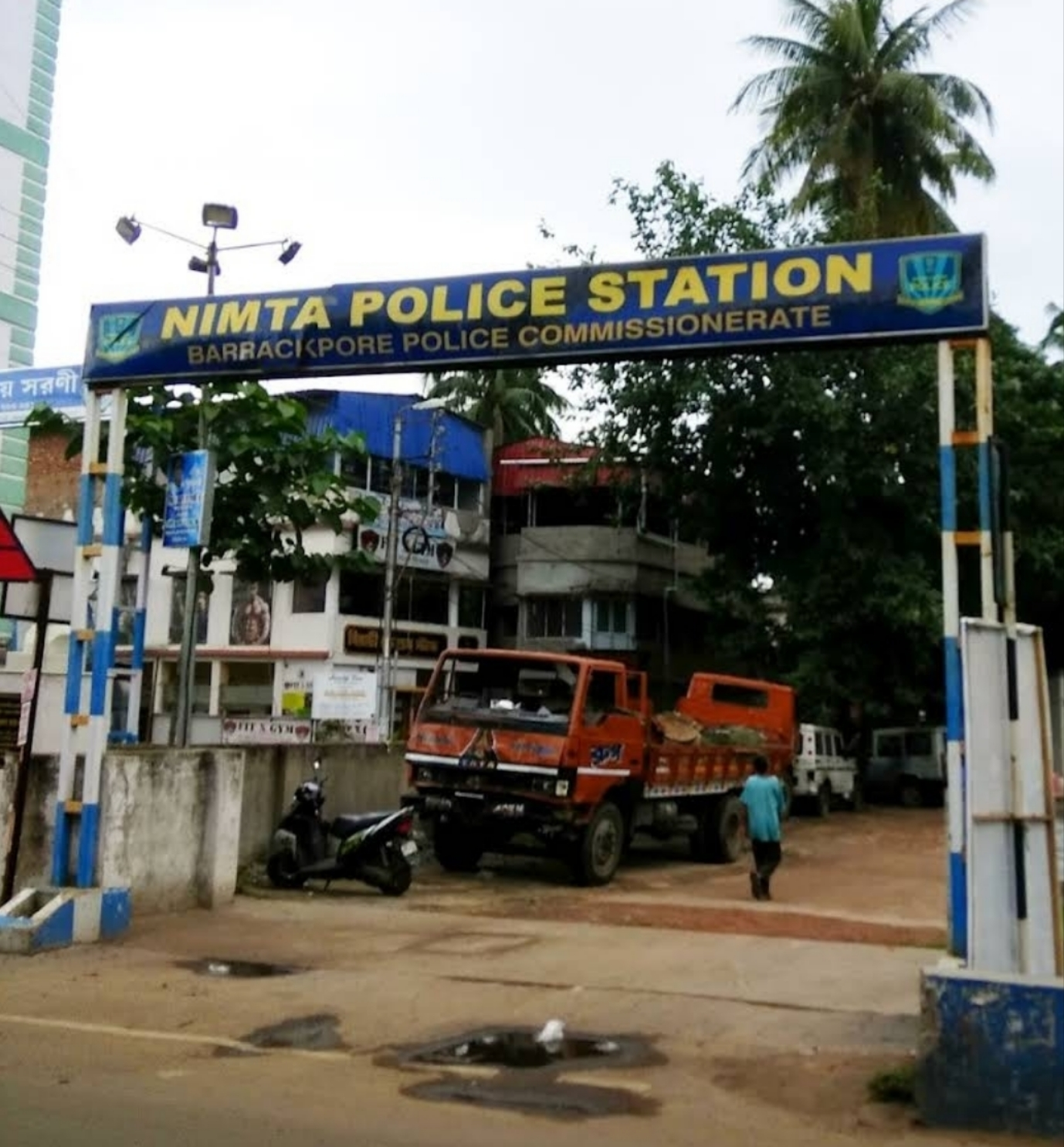
Nimta Police Station in North Dum Dum

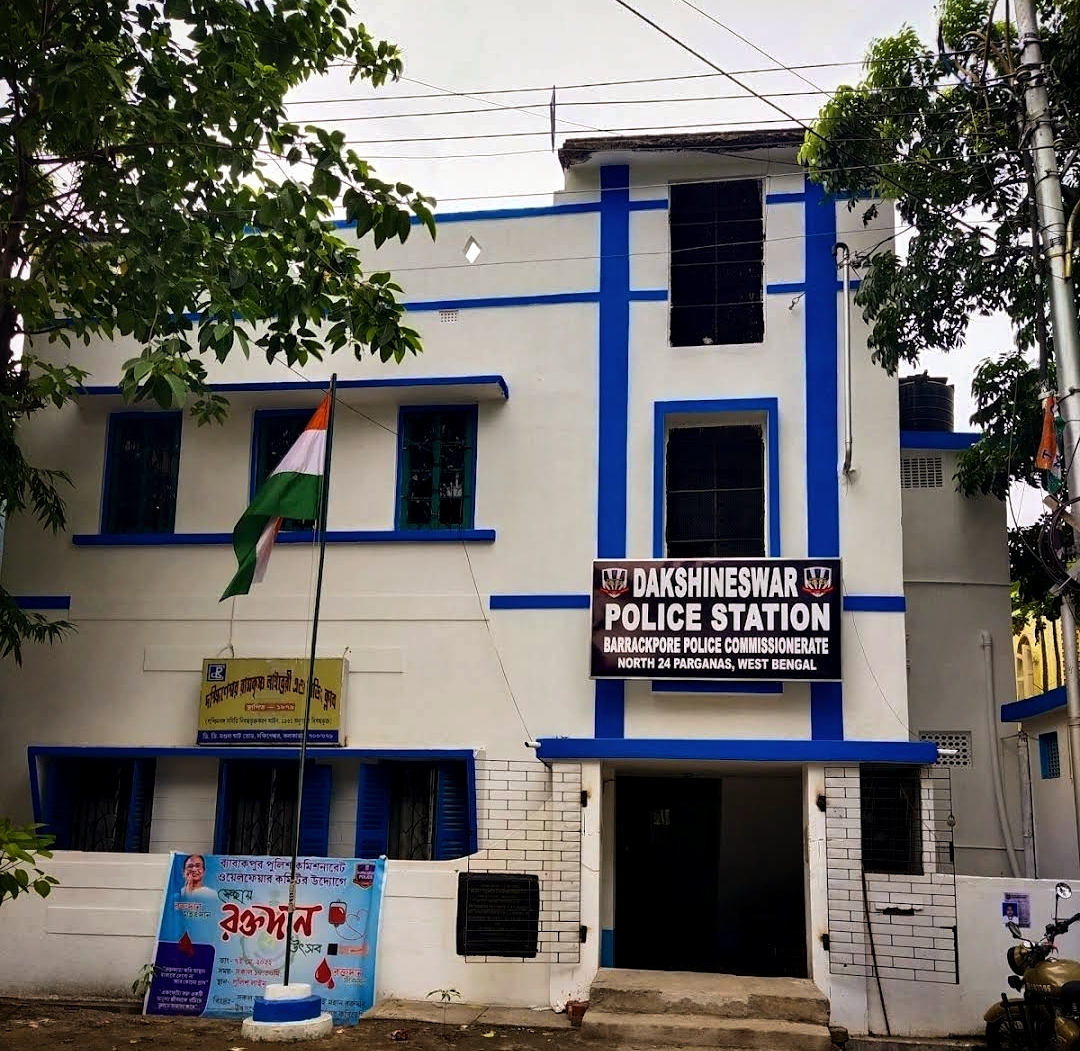
Dakshineswar police station in Kamarhati

Police stations in Barrackpore Police Commissionerate have the following features and jurisdiction:

Police stations (PS)	Established	Area covered	Bifurcated from parent PS	SHO rank	Ref.
Bizpore PS	‍–‍	Kanchrapara	‍–‍	Inspector (IC)	
Halisahar PS	10 March 2022	Halisahar	Bizpore, Naihati	Inspector (IC)	
Naihati PS	‍–‍	Naihati	‍–‍	Inspector (IC)	
Bhatpara PS	14 June 2019	Bhatpara (north)	Jagaddal	Inspector (IC)	
Jagaddal PS	‍–‍	Bhatpara (south part), Jagatdal, Shyamnagar (west part)	‍–‍	Inspector (IC)	
Noapara PS	‍–‍	Garulia, North Barrackpur (Ichapore, Palta neighbourhoods)	‍–‍	Inspector (IC)	
Basudevpur PS	10 March 2022	Basudebpur, Shyamnagar (east part)	Jagaddal, Bhatpara	Inspector (IC)	
Jetia PS	10 March 2022	Jetia, Palladaha, Nagdaha, Palashi	Bizpore	Sub-Inspector (OC)	
Shibdaspur PS	10 March 2022	Barrackpore I (larger part)	Naihati	Sub-Inspector (OC)	
Barrackpore PS	‍–‍	North Barrackpur (south part), Barrackpur Cantonment	‍–‍	Inspector (IC)	
Titagarh PS	‍–‍	Barrackpore, Titagarh	‍–‍	Inspector (IC)	
Khardaha PS	‍–‍	Khardaha, Panihati (west), Agarpara	‍–‍	Inspector (IC)	
Rahara PS	22 November 2019	Rahara (Khardaha west area), Patulia, Bandipur	Khardaha	Inspector (IC)	
Ghola PS	‍–‍	Ghola, Panihati (east partly), Bilkanda	Khardaha	Inspector (IC)	
New Barrackpore PS	2 March 2015	New Barrackpore	Ghola	Inspector (IC)	
Mohanpur PS	10 March 2022	Mohanpur, Sewli-Telenipara (incl. West Nilganj area) (Note: East Nilganj is controlled with administrative jurisdiction at Barasat Sadar subdivision.)	Titagarh	Sub-Inspector (OC)	
Dum Dum PS	‍–‍	Dum Dum, South Dum Dum (partly)	‍–‍	Inspector (IC)	
Nimta PS	‍–‍	North Dum Dum (Birati and Nimta) (Note: Kolkata Airport area (both NSCBIA PS and Airport PS) are controlled by Bidhannagar City Police under Barrackpore subdivision.)	‍–‍	Inspector (IC)	
Baranagar PS	‍–‍	Baranagar (central part)	‍–‍	Inspector (IC)	
Belgharia PS	21 February 1963	Belgharia	Baranagar	Inspector (IC)	
Nagerbazar PS	10 March 2022	South Dum Dum (Nagerbazar; except Lake Town) (Note: Lake Town PS is controlled by Bidhannagar City Police with administrative jurisdiction under Barrackpore subdivision.)	Dum Dum	Inspector (IC)	
Kamarhati PS	14 April 2022	Kamarhati (east)	Belgharia	Sub-Inspector (OC)	
Dakshineswar PS	14 April 2022	Dakshineswar area	Belgharia	Sub-Inspector (OC)	
Women PS	7 February 2014	Entire Barrackpore Police area	‍–‍	Inspector (IC)	
Cyber Crime PS	30 January 2015	Entire Barrackpore Police area	‍–‍	Inspector (IC)	

Note: Updated as of 2026.

== Blocks ==

Community development blocks in Barrackpore Subdivision are:

CD Block	Headquarters	Area km^{2}	Population (2011)	SC %	ST %	Hindus %	Muslims %	Literacy rate %	Census Towns
Barrackpore I	Panpur	95.44	194,333	28.80	3.81	84.38	14.46	85.91	11
Barrackpore II	Karna Madhabpur	40.74	217,171	24.86	2.26	77.70	21.46	84.53	13

== Gram panchayats ==
The subdivision contains 14 gram panchayats under 2 community development blocks:

- Gram panchayats in Barrackpore I CD Block are: Jethia, Kowgachi–I, Majhipara–Palasi, Panpur–Keutia, Kampa–Chakla, Kowgachi–II, Mamudpur and Shibdaspur.
- Gram panchayats in Barrackpore II CD Block are: Bandipur, Bilkanda–II, Patulia, Bilkanda–I, Mohanpur and Sewli.

== Municipal towns / cities ==
An overview of the municipal towns and cities in Barrackpore subdivision is given below.

Municipal town/city	Area (km^{2})	Population (2011)	Hindu %	Muslim %	Slum population %	BPL households % (2006)	Literacy% (2001)
Halisahar	8.28	124,939	89.82	9.70	15.05	14.49	82.86
Kanchrapara	9.07	129,576	97.56	1.44	11.28	17.93	87.09
Naihati	11.55	217,900	92.34	7.01	-	20.28	81.40
Bhatpara	28.55	386,019	85.53	13.43	-	18.40	78.91
Garulia	5.38	85,336	84.70	14.90	61.82	21.38	79.76
North Barrackpur	9.46	132,806	94.93	4.26	11.15	11.74	90.45
Barrackpore	10.61	152,783	85.76	13.37	3.76	9.85	86.51
Titagarh	3.24	116,541	74.35	24.95	78.96	5.41	73.37
Khardaha	6.87	108,496	90.58	8.79	29.51	6.97	89.70
Panihati	19.4	377,347	95.62	3.67	26.85	6.02	89.51
New Barrackpore	17.17	76,846	98.90	0.73	23.88	5.46	94.37
North Dumdum	26.45	249,142	93.13	6.26	1.21	12.24	89.83
Kamarhati	10.96	330,211	72.35	26.89	1.15	14.33	83.63
Baranagar	7.12	245,213	94.95	2.96	22.34	4.13	88.80
Dum Dum	8.81	114,786	90.11	6.55	-	4.65	89.36
South Dumdum	13.54	403,316	95.71	2.49	24.88	3.96	89.75

Note: The data used in this table in mainly from the District Human Development Report, based on 2001 census data, and may be at variance with the data used in municipal city/ town pages utilising≤ data from District Census Handbook 2011 or other sources. Please bear with the variance.

== Education ==
North 24 Parganas district had a literacy rate of 84.06% (for population of 7 years and above) as per the census of India 2011. Bangaon subdivision had a literacy rate of 80.57%, Barasat Sadar subdivision 84.90%, Barrackpur subdivision 89.09%, Bidhannagar subdivision 89.16% and Basirhat subdivision 75.67%.

Given in the table below (data in numbers) is a comprehensive picture of the education scenario in North 24 Parganas district for the year 2012-13:

Subdivision	Primary School		Middle School		High School		Higher Secondary School		General College, Univ		Technical / Professional Instt		Non-formal Education	
Subdivision	Institution	Student	Institution	Student	Institution	Student	Institution	Student	Institution	Student	Institution	Student	Institution	Student
Bangaon	533	54,361	1	36	31	14,654	83	107,745	4	11,031	1	95	1,594	54,016
Barasat Sadar	920	120,670	19	2,734	93	63,707	171	246,098	14	40,466	23	6,190	2,887	130,522
Barrackpore	948	126,453	29	5,716	193	165,924	205	215,713	25	44,818	20	6,345	2,483	160,236
Bidhannagar	20	12,317	–	–	1	900	17	22,536	1	865	15	5,432	1	552
Basirhat	1,256	139,737	25	10,165	124	101,536	118	105,724	5	15,248	–	–	3,800	164,833
North 24 Parganas district	3,677	453,538	74	18,651	442	346,721	594	697,816	49	112,428	59	18,062	10,765	439,560

Note: Primary schools include junior basic schools; middle schools, high schools and higher secondary schools include madrasahs; technical schools include junior technical schools, junior government polytechnics, industrial technical institutes, industrial training centres, nursing training institutes etc.; technical and professional colleges include engineering colleges, medical colleges, para-medical institutes, management colleges, teachers training and nursing training colleges, law colleges, art colleges, music colleges etc. Special and non-formal education centres include sishu siksha kendras, madhyamik siksha kendras, centres of Rabindra mukta vidyalaya, recognised Sanskrit tols, institutions for the blind and other handicapped persons, Anganwadi centres, reformatory schools etc.

The following institutions are located in Barrackpore subdivision:

- Indian Statistical Institute at Baranagar is an academic institute of national importance as recognised by a 1959 act of the Indian parliament. Established in 1931, this public university of India is focused on statistics.
- Barrackpore Rastraguru Surendranath College was established at Barrackpore in 1953.
- Bhairab Ganguly College was established at Belgharia in 1968.
- Brahmananda Keshab Chandra College was established at Bon Hooghly in 1956.
- Prasanta Chandra Mahalanobis Mahavidyalaya was established at Bon Hooghly in 1965.
- Mahadevananda Mahavidyalaya was established at Manirampur in 1968.
- Morning Star College, a private college and a seminary, was established at Barrackpore in 1971.
- Mrinalini Datta Mahavidyapith was established at Birati in 1964.
- Naba Barrackpore Prafulla Chandra Mahavidyalaya was established at New Barrackpore in 1960.
- Dum Dum Motijheel College was established at Dum Dum in 1950.
- Dum Dum Motijheel Rabindra Mahavidyalaya was established at Dum Dum in 1968.
- Sarojini Naidu College for Women was established at Dum Dum in 1956.
- Ramakrishna Sarada Mission Vivekananda Vidyabhavan was established at Dum Dum in 1961.
- Hiralal Mazumdar Memorial College for Women was established at Dakshineswar in 1959.
- Panihati Mahavidyalaya was established at Sodepur in 1976.
- Ramakrishna Mission Vivekananda Centenary College was established at Rahara in 1963.
- Rishi Bankim Chandra College was established at Naihati in 1947.
- Rishi Bankim Chandra College for Women was established initially started as the morning section for women in Rishi Bankim Chandra College. The college was rechristened in 1984 as Rishi Bankim Chandra College for Women.
- Rishi Bankim Chandra Evening College was set up initially as the evening section of Rishi Bankim Chandra College and was rechristened as Rishi Bankim Chandra Evening College in 1984.
- Kanchrapara College was established at Kanchrapara in 1972. It is affiliated to the University of Kalyani.
- P.N. Das College was established at PO Bengal Enamel, Palta in 1962.
- East Calcutta Girl's College was established at Lake Town in 1992.
- College of Medicine & Sagore Dutta Hospital was started at Kamarhati by the Government of West Bengal in 2010 and MBBS course was started in 2011.
- St. Mary's Technical Campus Kolkata, a private engineering college, was established on Barasat-Barrackpore Road at Saibona, Nilganj in 2011.
- Guru Nanak Institute of Technology, a private engineering college, was established, near Sodepur in 2003.
- Narula Institute of Technology, a private engineering college, was established at Agarpara in 2001.
- Elitte Institute of Engineering and Management was established at PO Karna Madhabpur in 2009. It offers diploma (3-years) courses.

See also – List of West Bengal districts ranked by literacy rate

== Healthcare ==
The table below (all data in numbers) presents an overview of the medical facilities available and patients treated in the hospitals, health centres and sub-centres in 2013 in North 24 Parganas district.

Subdivision	Health & Family Welfare Deptt, WB				Other State Govt Deptts**	Local bodies**	Central Govt Deptts / PSUs**	NGO / Private Nursing Homes**	Total	Total Number of Beds	Total Number of Doctors*	Indoor Patients	Outdoor Patients
Subdivision	Hospitals	Rural Hospitals	Block Primary Health Centres	Primary Health Centres	Other State Govt Deptts**	Local bodies**	Central Govt Deptts / PSUs**	NGO / Private Nursing Homes**	Total	Total Number of Beds	Total Number of Doctors*	Indoor Patients	Outdoor Patients
Bangaon	1	1	2	10	–	–	–	–	14	417	24	11,587	650,349
Barasat Sadar	3	1	6	15	–	–	–	–	25	1,084	45	125,000	1,397,574
Barrackpore	7	-	2	2	-	-	–	–	11	1,081	8	94,042	1,010,820
Bidhannagar	1	–	–	–	–	–	–	`	1	100	–	6,567	117,136
Basirhat	1	5	5	23	–	–	–	–	34	703	77	69,034	897,725
North 24 Parganas district	13	7	15	50	6	27	3	233	354	3,385	154	306,230	4,073,604

.* Excluding nursing homes.
**Subdivision-wise break up for certain items not available.

Medical facilities available in Barrackpore subdivision are as follows:

Hospitals: (Name, location, beds)
B.N.Bose Subdivisional Hospital, Barrackpore, 200 beds
Barrackpore Cantonment Hospital, Barrackpore, 48 beds
Barrackpore Police Case Hospital, Barrackpore, 6 beds
Police Brigade Hospital, Barrackpore, 120 beds
Naihati State General Hospital, Naihati, 131 beds
Lalit Mohan Maternity Home, Naihati, 11 beds
Bhatpara State General Hospital, Bhatpara, 119 beds
Matri Mangal Pratisthan, Bhatpara, 15 beds
Kanchrapara Railway Hospital, Kanchrapara, 220 beds
Shibani Arogya Niketan, Kanchrapara, 8 beds
Municipal Maternity-cun-Child Welfare Hospital, Halisahar, 10 beds
ESI Hospital, Kamarhati, 350 beds
Sagar Dutta State General Hospital, Kamarhati, 131 beds
Panihati State General Hospital, Panihati, 150 beds
Panihati Municipal Maternity Home, Panihati, 10 beds
Shree Balaram Seva Mandir, Khardaha, 100 beds
Baranagar State General Hospital, Baranagar, 100 beds
Baranagar Maternity Hospital, Baranagar, 40 beds
Dum Dum Central Jail Hospital, Dum Dum, 100 beds
Dum Dum Municipal Specialised Hospital, Dum Dum, 105 beds
North Dumdum Municipal Hospital, North Dumdum, 32 beds
South Dumdum Maternity Home, South Dumdum, 15 beds

Rural Hospitals: (Name, block, location, beds)
Nanna Rural Hospital, Malancha (via Hazinagar), 30 beds

Block Primary Health Centres: (Name, block, location, beds)
Bandipur BPHC, Bandipur, 15 beds

Primary Health Centres: (CD Block-wise)(CD Block, PHC location, beds)
Barrackpore I CD Block: Narayanpur PHC, Kakinara (via Jagatdal) (6)
Barrackpore II CD Block: Bilkanda (Teghari) PHC, Muragachha (6), Sultanpur PHC (6)

Private Medical Facilities (Name, location, speciality)
Sarada Seva Sadan, 114, Barasat Road, Barrackpore (general medicine, gynaecology)
Disha Eye Hospital, 88 (63A), Ghoshpara Road, Barrackpore (ophthalmology, paediatric ophthalmology)
Disha Cataract and Refractive Surgi Centre, 130B, Ghoshpara Road, Barrackpore (ophthalmology, paediatric ophthalmology)
ILS Hospitals, Mall Road, Khudiram Bose Sarani, Dum Dum (cardiology, nephrology, general medicine, dermatology, urology etc.)

== Electoral constituencies ==
Lok Sabha (parliamentary) and Vidhan Sabha (state assembly) constituencies in Barrackpore subdivision were as follows:

Lok Sabha constituency	Reservation	Vidhan Sabha constituency	Reservation	CD Block and/or Gram panchayats and/or municipal areas
Barrackpore	None	Amdanga in Barasat Sadar subdivision	None	Amdanga CD Block, and Dattapukur I, Dattapukur II and Kashimpur GPs of Barasat I CD Block
		Bijpur	None	Kanchrapara municipality and Halisahar municipality
		Naihati	None	Naihati municipality, and Jethia, Kampa-Chakla, Majhipara–Palasi and Shibdaspur GPs of Barrackpore I CD Block
		Bhatpara	None	Ward Nos.1 to 17 of Bhatpara municipality
		Jagatdal	None	Ward Nos. 18 to 35 of Bhatpara Municipality, and Kowgachi I, Kowgachi II, Mamudpur, Panpur Keutia GPs of Barrackpore I CD Block
		Noapara	None	North Barrackpur municipality, Garulia municipality, Ichhapur Defence Estate, Barrackpur Cantonment, Mohanpur and Seuli GPs of Barrackpore II CD Block
		Barrackpore	None	Barrackpore municipality and Titagarh municipality
Dum Dum	None	Khardaha	None	Khardaha municipality, Ward Nos.15, 18 to 21 and 35 of Panihati municipality, and Bandipur, Bilkanda I, Bilkanda II and Patulia GPs of Barrackpore II CD Block
		Dum Dum Uttar	None	North Dum Dum municipality and New Barrackpur municipality
		Panihati	None	Ward Nos.1 to 14, 16, 17 and 22 to 34 of Panihati municipality
		Kamarhati	None	Ward Nos. 1 to 16 and 21 to 35 of Kamarhati municipality
		Baranagar	None	Baranagar Municipality and Ward Nos.17 to 20 of Kamarhati municipality
		Dum Dum	None	Dum Dum municipality and Ward Nos.1 to 17 of South Dumdum municipality
		Rajarhat Gopalpur partly in Bidhannagar Sub-Division(Before 2015 Barasat Sadar Subdivision )	None	Wards Nos. 7-9 and 14-26 of Bidhannagar Municipal Corporation (Before 2015 Rajarhat-Gopalpur Municipality) and Ward Nos.18 and 21 to 27 of South Dumdum Municipality
