= Jagatdal =

Jagatdal Jagaddal
- Locality
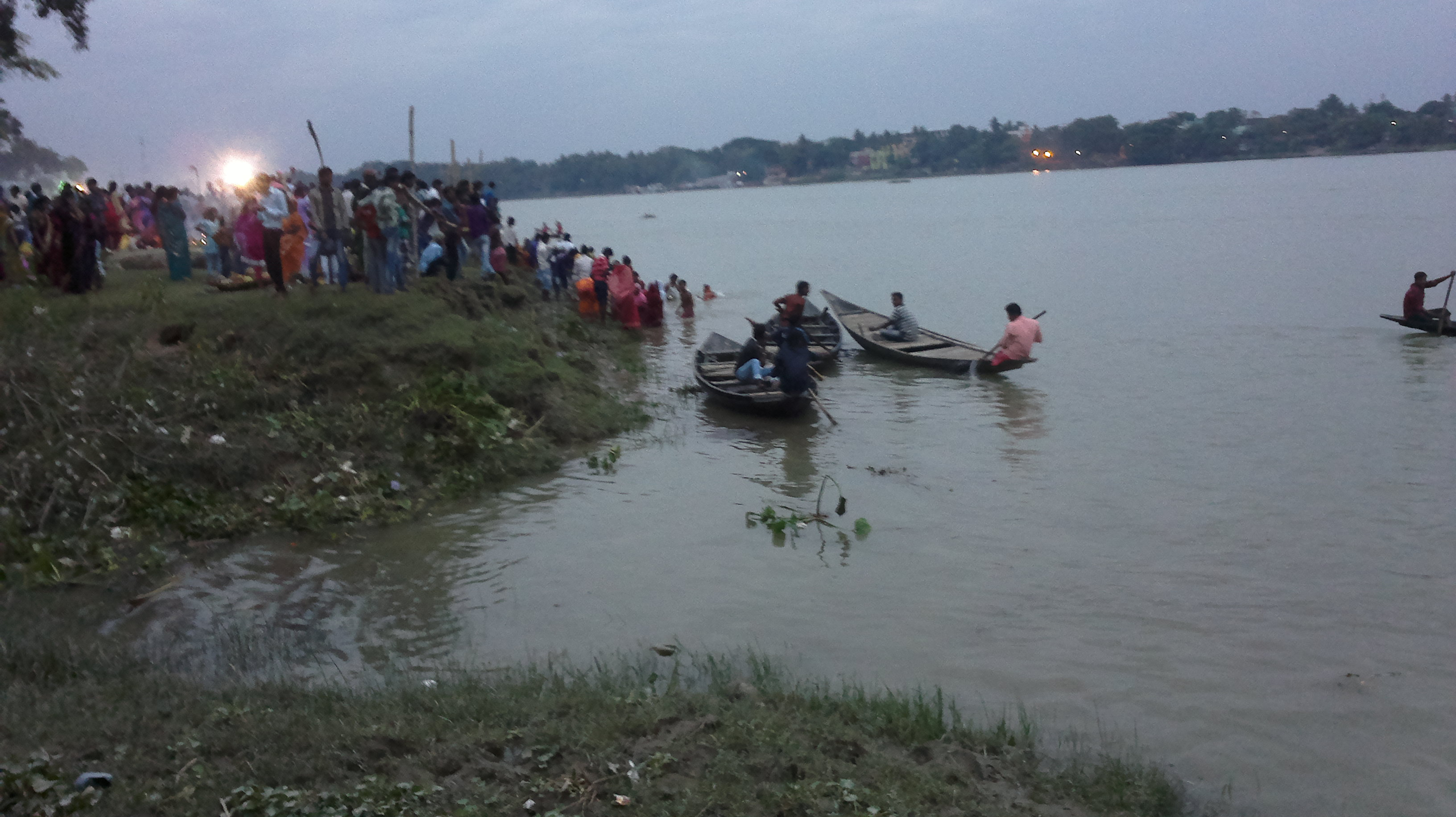
- Jagatdal Ghat

- Location in West Bengal, India Jagatdal (India)
- Coordinates: 22.8625°N 88.3861°E
- Country: India
- State: West Bengal
- Division: Presidency
- District: North 24 Parganas

Government
  - Type: Municipality
  - Body: Bhatpara Municipality
- Elevation: 15 m (49 ft)

Languages
  - Official: Bengali, English
- Time zone: UTC+5:30 (IST)
- PIN: 743125
- Telephone code: +91 33
- Vehicle registration: WB
- Lok Sabha constituency: Barrackpore
- Vidhan Sabha constituency: Jagatdal
- Website: north24parganas.nic.in

Jagatdal (also known as Jagaddal) is a locality in Bhatpara of North 24 Parganas district in the Indian state of West Bengal. It is a part of the area covered by Kolkata Metropolitan Development Authority (KMDA).

== History ==
"We can find the name of jagaddal as a village as long as 460 years ago in written records but the place is thought to be more 100 to 150 years older or maybe even much more than that. Bipradas Pipalai (1545 AD) in his work "Manasha Mangal" tells us through his protagonist character "Chand Sadagar" about Jagatdal. Chand Saudagar mentions in his "Kabi Kankan Chandi", Jagaddal as one of the places passed by him in his voyage down the Bhagirathi (the Hooghly) and where he saw many palatial buildings built by Brahmins and Kayasthas. Haldars were the most prominent Brahmins the others being Chakrabarties and Pakrasis. Deys were the most renowned Kayastha family while Sarkars was the same amongst Mahisyas."

Pratapaditya (1561–1611 CE), The kayastha king and zamindar of Jessore made a couple of trenches and a fort at Jagatdal along with Mulajore, present day Shyamnagar as his military establishment against Muslim invaders.

According to Bengal District Gazetteers: 24-Parganas, circa 1914 "In Jagatdal the lines of two moats and two large tanks are reputed to be the remains of a fort erected by Pratapaditya in the sixteenth century".

== Geography ==
Cities and towns in the northern portion of Barrackpore subdivision in North 24 Parganas district
M: municipal city/ town, CT: census town,
N: neighbourhood, OG: outgrowth
Owing to space constraints in the small map, the actual locations in a larger map may vary slightly

=== Location ===
Jagatdal is located at 22.85°N 88.38°E. It has an average elevation of 15 metres (49 feet).

Situated on the eastern banks of the river Ganges, the town has many jute mills. The town has an Indian Army base workshop (No-507).

96% of the population of Barrackpore subdivision (partly presented in the map alongside) live in urban areas. In 2011, it had a density of population of 10,967 per km^{2} The subdivision has 16 municipalities and 24 census towns.

For most of the cities/ towns information regarding density of population is available in the Infobox. Population data is not available for neighbourhoods. It is available for the entire municipal area and thereafter ward-wise.

All places marked on the map are linked in the full-screen map.

=== Police station ===
Jagaddal police station under Barrackpore Police Commissionerate has jurisdiction over Bhatpara Municipal area.

=== Post Office ===
Jagatdal has a delivery sub post office, with PIN 743125 in the North Presidency Division of North 24 Parganas district in Calcutta region. Other post offices with the same PIN are Golghar and Guptar Bagan.

== Demographics ==
=== Migrants ===
The Jute Mills drew in a large labour force from the neighbouring states of Bihar and Orissa, as well as eastern Uttar Pradesh, quite often forming an overwhelming majority of the population in the area, living in shanty towns and bustees dotting the mill area.

=== Kolkata Urban Agglomeration ===
The following Municipalities, Census Towns and other locations in Barrackpore subdivision were part of Kolkata Urban Agglomeration in the 2011 census: Kanchrapara (M), Jetia (CT), Halisahar (M), Balibhara (CT), Naihati (M), Bhatpara (M), Kaugachhi (CT), Garshyamnagar (CT), Garulia (M), Ichhapur Defence Estate (CT), North Barrackpur (M), Barrackpur Cantonment (CB), Barrackpore (M), Jafarpur (CT), Ruiya (CT), Titagarh (M), Khardaha (M), Bandipur (CT), Panihati (M), Muragachha (CT) New Barrackpore (M), Chandpur (CT), Talbandha (CT), Patulia (CT), Kamarhati (M), Baranagar (M), South Dumdum (M), North Dumdum (M), Dum Dum (M), Noapara (CT), Babanpur (CT), Teghari (CT), Nanna (OG), Chakla (OG), Srotribati (OG) and Panpur (OG).

== Transport ==
Jagatdal railway station is 34 km from Sealdah Station and 4 km from Naihati Junction on the Sealdah-Naihati branch line of Eastern Railway. It is part of the Kolkata Suburban Railway system.

There is a ferry which connects Jagatdal with Chandannagar, managed by the State Transport Department.

Ghoshpara Road passes through Jagatdal. Public transport includes toto rickshaws running between Jagatdal and Bhatpara or Jagatdal and Shyamnagar, and bus service routes 85 running between Barrackpore and Kanchrapara.

== Culture ==
Durga Puja is the main festival when thousands of Hindu devotees follow the traditional rituals and enjoy the festive mood. It has one of the prominent NGO Lions club of Jagatdal affiliated to Lions Clubs International. Dedicated for the community welfare and inspired by Lions Motto "WE SERVE". Under Bhatpara Municipality JAGATDAL is also famous for Ganesh Chaturthi, Vishwakarma Puja and Chatth Puja.

== Sports ==
People of Jagatdal like to watch and play cricket. Along with cricket, football is also the favorite sport here. The cricket tournament is organized named Bankim Cup in many areas of Jagatdal, Bhatpara, Shyamnagar & Kankinara.There is a Club in Jagatdal called JAGADDAL YUVA SPORTING CLUB (JYSC) Founded by Avijit Roy.

== Healthcare ==
Jagatdal has Bhatpara State General Hospital as its primary health care unit. North 24 Parganas district has been identified as one of the areas where ground water is affected by arsenic contamination.

== Gallery ==
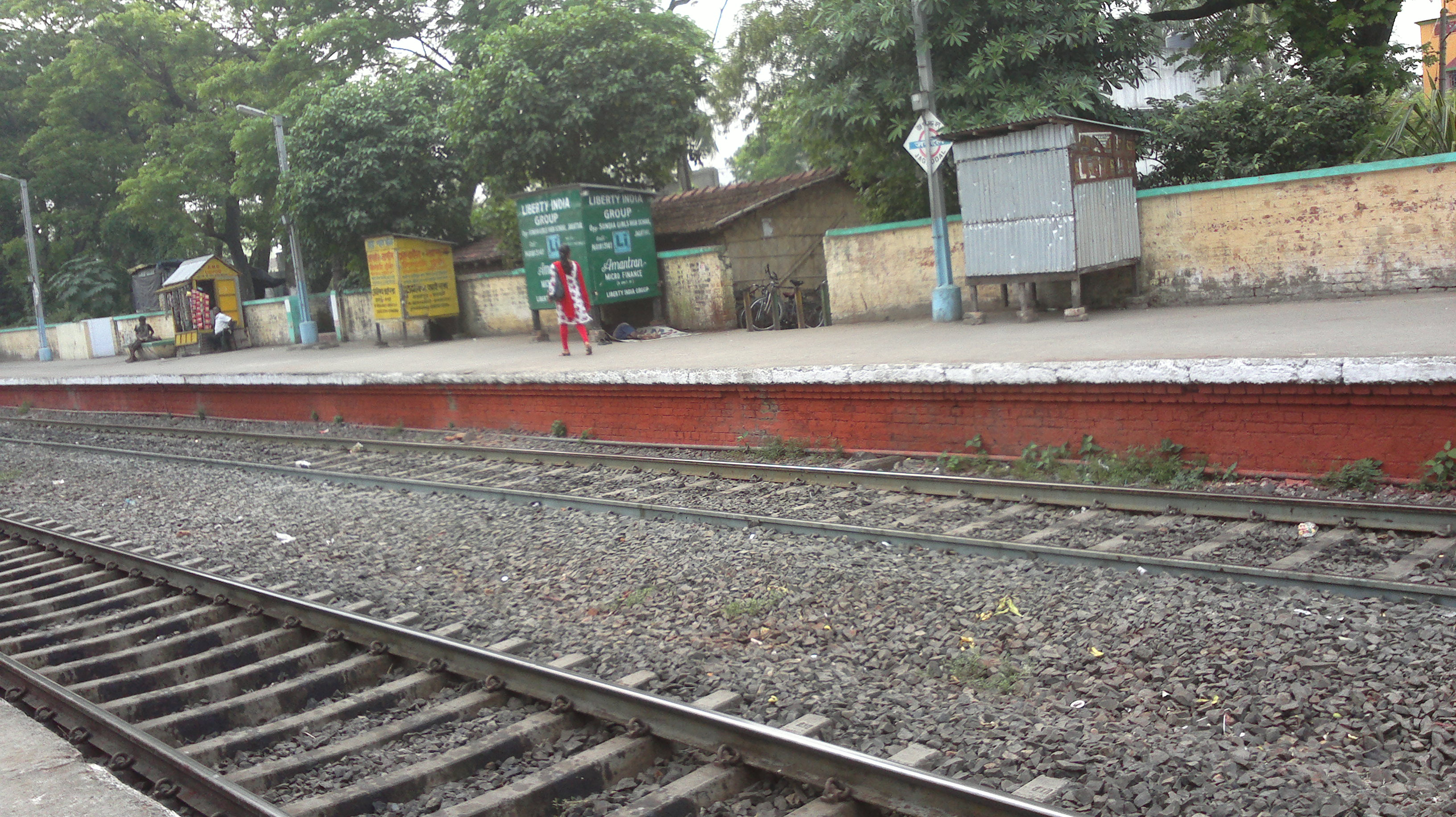
Jagatdal railway station - 1

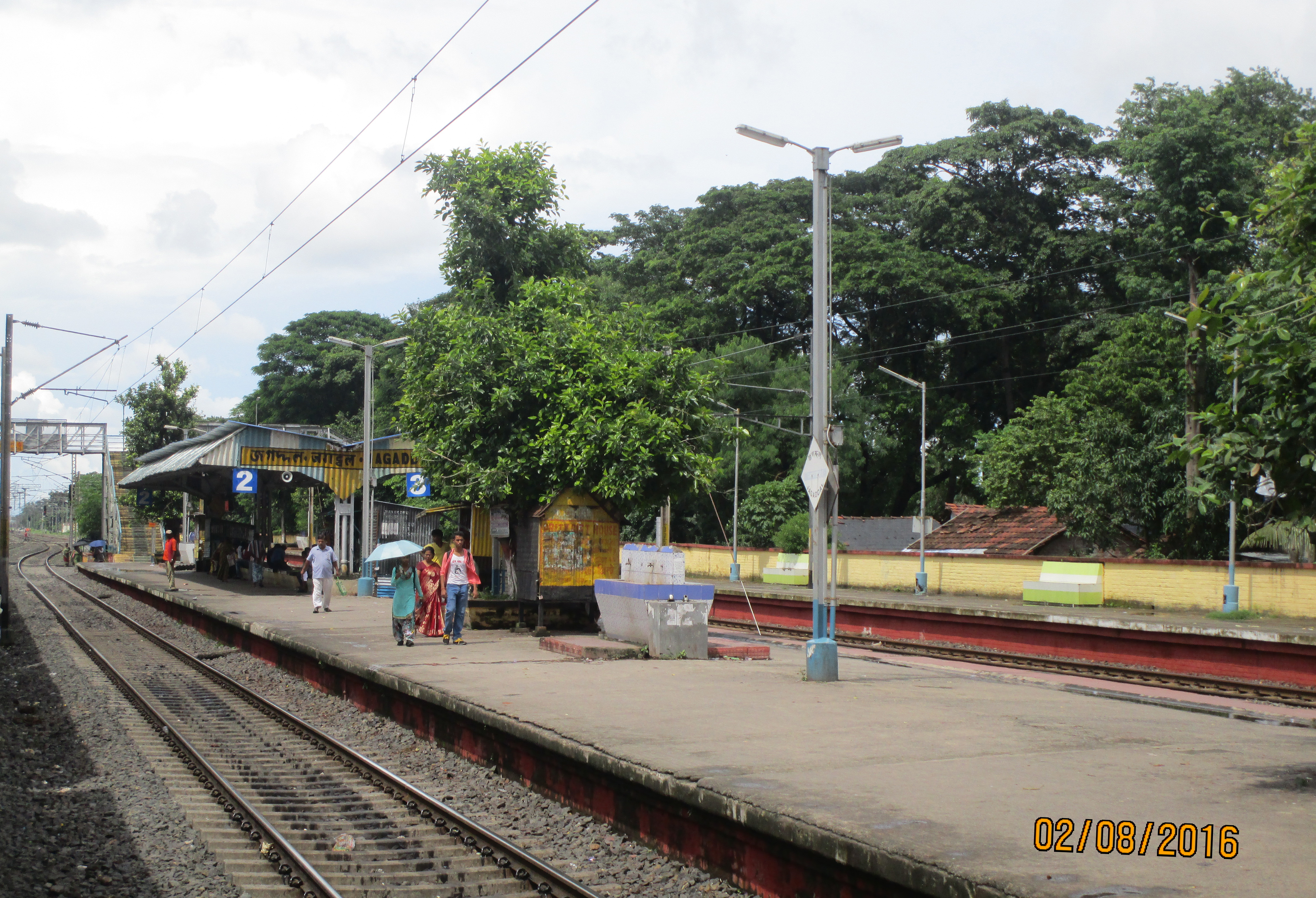
Jagatdal railway station - 2

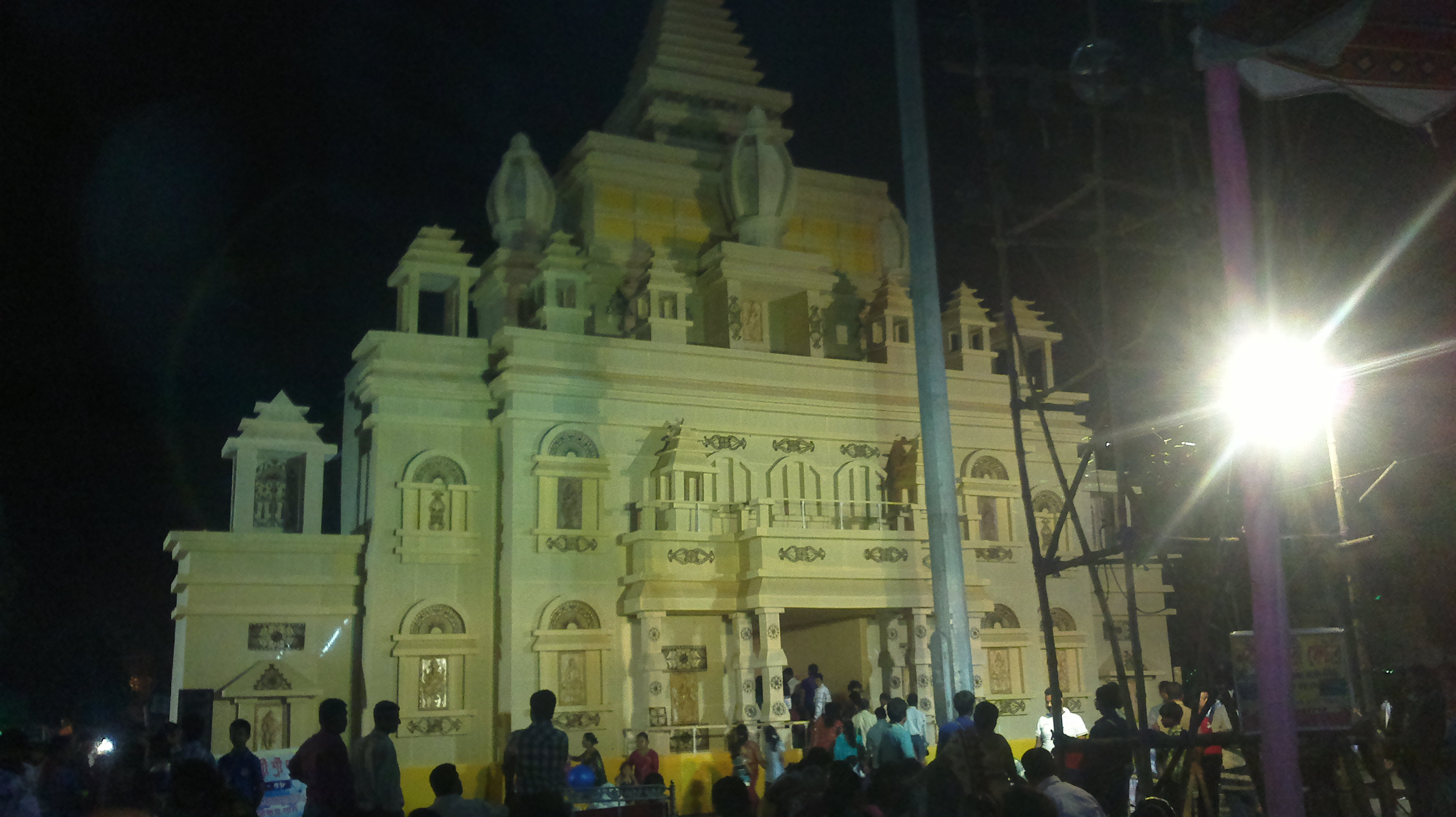
Jagatdal Durga Puja
