= Palladaha =

- Census Town
- Location in West Bengal, India Palladaha (India)
- Coordinates: 22.9387°N 88.4665°E
- Country: India
- State: West Bengal
- District: North 24 Parganas

Area
  - Total: 1.77 km^{2} (0.68 sq mi)

Population (2011)
  - Total: 5,994
  - Density: 3,390/km^{2} (8,770/sq mi)

Languages
  - Official: Bengali, English
- Time zone: UTC+5:30 (IST)
- Telephone code: +91 33
- Vehicle registration: WB
- Lok Sabha constituency: Barrackpore
- Vidhan Sabha constituency: Naihati
- Website: north24parganas.nic.in

Palladaha is a census town in Barrackpore I CD Block of Barrackpore subdivision in North 24 Parganas district in the Indian state of West Bengal.

== Geography ==
Cities and towns in the northern portion of Barrackpore subdivision in North 24 Parganas district
M: municipal city/ town, CT: census town,
N: neighbourhood, OG: outgrowth
Owing to space constraints in the small map, the actual locations in a larger map may vary slightly

=== Location ===
Palladaha, Nagdaha, Palashi and Srotribati (OG) form an urban cluster east of Kanchrapara. Jetia, Nanna (OG) and Chakla (OG) form another urban cluster south of Kanchrapara.

96% of the population of Barrackpore subdivision (partly presented in the map alongside) live in urban areas. In 2011, it had a density of population of 10,967 per km^{2} The subdivision has 16 municipalities and 24 census towns.

For most of the cities/ towns information regarding density of population is available in the Infobox. Population data is not available for neighbourhoods. It is available for the entire municipal area and thereafter ward-wise.

All places marked on the map are linked in the full-screen map.

=== Police station ===
Naihati police station under Barrackpore Police Commissionerate has jurisdiction over Naihati municipal area and Barrackpore I CD Block, including Barrackpur Cantonment Board.

== Demographics ==
As of 2011 India census, Palladaha had a population of 5,994; of this, 3,052 are male, 2,942 female. It has an average literacy rate of 77.01%, higher than the national average of 74.04%.

== Infrastructure ==
As per the District Census Handbook 2011, Palladaha covered an area of 1.7731 km^{2}. Amongst the medical facilities it had were 3 charitable hospital/ nursing homes and 21 medicine shops. Amongst the educational facilities it had were 3 primary schools, and the other nearest schools were available 4 km away at Kanchrapara.

== Transport ==
Palladaha is beside Kalyani Expressway.

The Kanchrapara railway station on the Sealdah-Ranaghat line is located nearby.

== Healthcare ==
North 24 Parganas district has been identified as one of the areas where ground water is affected by arsenic contamination.
