= Palashi, North 24 Parganas =

Palashi
- Census Town
- Nickname: mahji-para(local)
- Location in West Bengal, India Palashi (India)
- Coordinates: 22.9277°N 88.4907°E
- Country: India
- State: West Bengal
- District: North 24 Parganas

Area
  - Total: 3.49 km^{2} (1.35 sq mi)

Population (2011)
  - Total: 6,748
  - Density: 1,930/km^{2} (5,010/sq mi)

Languages
  - Official: Bengali, English
- Time zone: UTC+5:30 (IST)
- PIN: 743145
- Telephone code: +91 33
- Vehicle registration: WB
- Lok Sabha constituency: Barrackpore
- Vidhan Sabha constituency: Naihati
- Website: north24parganas.nic.in

Palashi is a census town in Barrackpore I CD Block of Barrackpore subdivision in North 24 Parganas district in the Indian state of West Bengal.

== Geography ==
Cities and towns in the northern portion of Barrackpore subdivision in North 24 Parganas district
M: municipal city/ town, CT: census town,
N: neighbourhood, OG: outgrowth
Owing to space constraints in the small map, the actual locations in a larger map may vary slightly

=== Location ===
Palladaha, Nagdaha, Palashi and Srotribati (OG) form an urban cluster east of Kanchrapara. Jetia, Nanna (OG) and Chakla (OG) form another urban cluster south of Kanchrapara.

96% of the population of Barrackpore subdivision (partly presented in the map alongside) live in urban areas. In 2011, it had a density of population of 10,967 per km^{2} The subdivision has 16 municipalities and 24 census towns.

For most of the cities/ towns information regarding density of population is available in the Infobox. Population data is not available for neighbourhoods. It is available for the entire municipal area and thereafter ward-wise.

All places marked on the map are linked in the full-screen map.

=== Police station ===
Naihati police station under Barrackpore Police Commissionerate has jurisdiction over Naihati municipal area and Barrackpore I CD Block, including Barrackpur Cantonment Board.

=== Post Office ===
Palashi has a delivery branch post office, with PIN 743145 in the North Presidency Division of North 24 Parganas district in Calcutta region. The other post offices with the same PIN are Bagermore, Binodnagar, Chandmari Road, Kanchrapara, Kancrapara Loco Shop, Barajonepur, Chandua, Majhipara and Saliadaha.

== Demographics ==
As of 2011 India census, Palashi had a population of 6.748; of this, 3,461 are male, 3,287 female. It has an average literacy rate of 80.79%, higher than the national average of 74.04%.

== Infrastructure ==
As per the District Census Handbook 2011, Palashi covered an area of 3.4938 km^{2}. Amongst the medical facilities it had were 3 medicine stores. Amongst the educational facilities It had were 2 primary schools, 2 middle schools, 2 secondary schools and 2 senior secondary schools.

== Education ==
Palashi has two major education institutes namely Palasi Acharya Durga Prasanna High School for girls (Secondary), Palasi Acharya Durga Prasanna High School for boys (Higher Secondary) where 11th and 12th standards are co-ed type.

== Shrines ==
The most holy place in Palashi is Sri Sri Durga Prashanna Paramahansha Ashram (Sri Guru Ashram), which also has several branches worldwide including Naktala, Kolkata.

== Transport ==
Palashi is well connected by bus service with nearby town Kanchrapara and National Highway 12 (old numbering NH 34) by Kanchrapara-Haringhata Road.

Palashi is on the Kanchrapara-Haringhata Road.

The nearest railway station is Kanchrapara railway station.

== Healthcare ==
North 24 Parganas district has been identified as one of the areas where ground water is affected by arsenic contamination.
