= Bilkanda =

- Census Town
- Location in West Bengal, India Bilkanda (India)
- Coordinates: 22.7042°N 88.4125°E
- Country: India
- State: West Bengal
- District: North 24 Parganas

Area
  - Total: 0.53 km^{2} (0.20 sq mi)

Population (2011)
  - Total: 6,081
  - Density: 11,000/km^{2} (30,000/sq mi)

Languages
  - Official: Bengali, English
- Time zone: UTC+5:30 (IST)
- PIN: 700110
- Telephone code: +91 33
- Vehicle registration: WB
- Lok Sabha constituency: Dum Dum
- Vidhan Sabha constituency: Khardaha
- Website: north24parganas.nic.in

Bilkanda is a census town in Barrackpore II CD Block in Barrackpore subdivision of North 24 Parganas district in the state of West Bengal, India.

== Geography ==
Cities and towns in the southern portion of Barrackpore subdivision in North 24 Parganas district
M: municipal city/ town, CT: census town,
N: neighbourhood/ administrative location
Owing to space constraints in the small map, the actual locations in a larger map may vary slightly

=== Location ===
Sodepur, Muragachha and Karna Madhabpur are located nearby.

96% of the population of Barrackpore subdivision (partly presented in the map alongside, all places marked in the map are link in the full screen map) lives in urban areas. In 2011, it had a density of population of 10,967 per km^{2}. The subdivision has 16 municipalities and 24 census towns.

For most of the cities/ towns information regarding density of population is available in the Infobox. Population data is not available for neighbourhoods. It is available for the entire Municipal area and thereafter ward-wise.

=== Police station ===
Khardaha police station under Barrackpore Police Commissionerate has jurisdiction over Khardaha Municipal area and Barrackpore II CD Block.

== Demographics ==
As per the 2011 Census of India, Bilkanda had a total population of 6,081, of which 3,156 (52%) were males and 2,925 (48%) were females. Population below 6 years was 514. The total number of literates in Bilkanda was 4,605 (82.72% of the population over 6 years).

== Infrastructure ==
As per the District Census Handbook 2011, Bilkanda covered an area of 0.5321 km^{2}. Amongst the medical facilities it had were a dispensary/ health centre, a family welfare centre, a maternity and child welfare centre, a maternity home and 3 medicine shops. Amongst the educational facilities it had were a primary school and a middle school. The nearest secondary and senior secondary schools were available 2 km away at New Barrackpore.

== Transport ==
Bilkanda is located on the Sodepur-Barasat Road. It is also near to Kalyani Expressway.

=== Bus ===
==== Private Bus ====
- 214 Sajirhat - Babughat
- DN43 Barasat Checkpost - Dakshineswar

==== WBTC Bus ====
- AC10 Nilganj - Howrah Station

==== Bus Route Without Number ====
- Madhyamgram - Howrah Station

=== Train ===
The nearest railway stations are Madhyamgram railway station on the Sealdah-Bangaon line and Sodepur railway station on the Sealdah-Ranaghat line.

== Healthcare ==
Block Primary Health Centre at Bandipur is located nearby.
