= Jagaddal railway station =

Railway station in West Bengal, India

Jagaddal
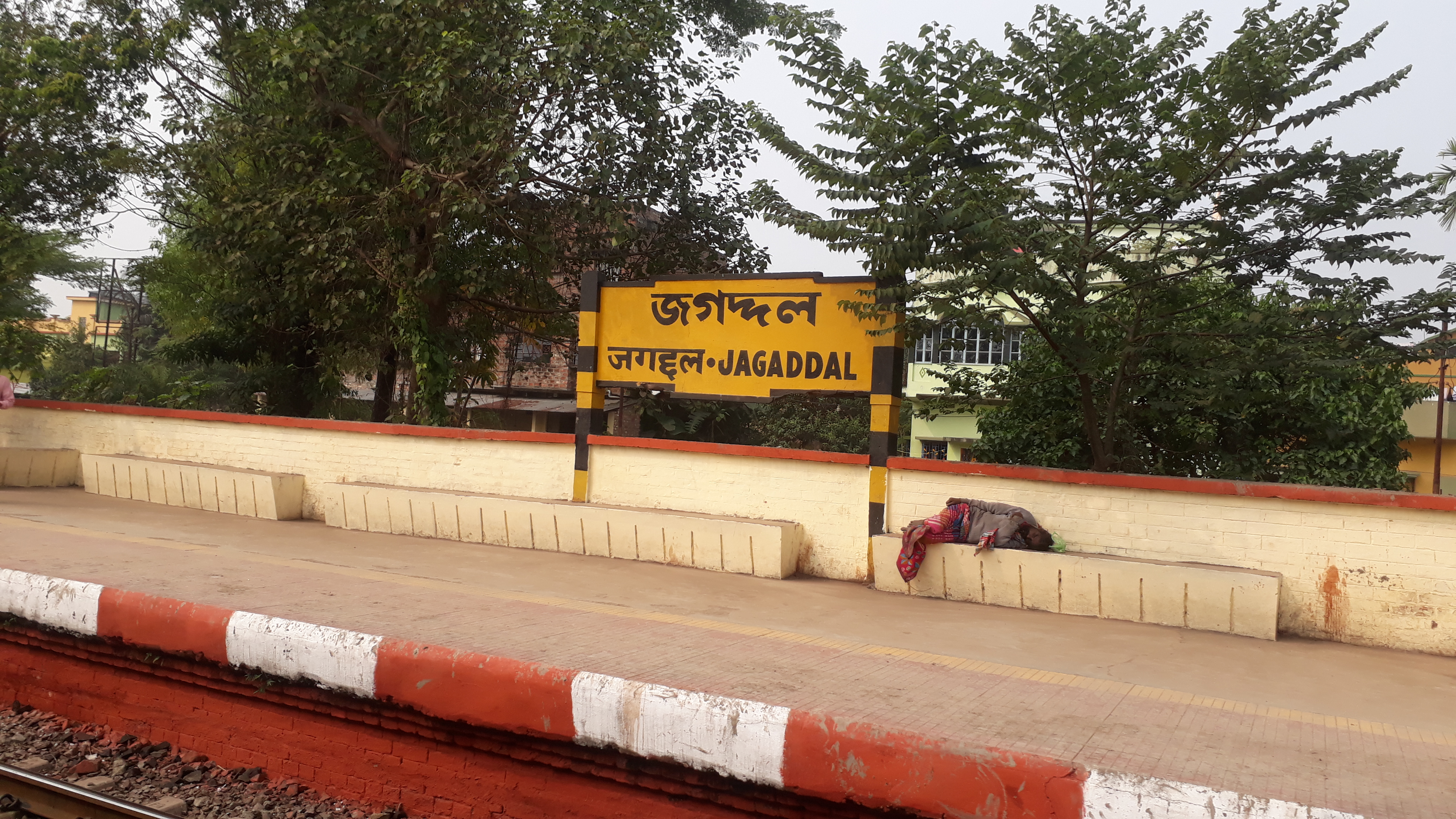
- Jagaddal railway station

General information
- Location: Jagatdal, North 24 Parganas district, West Bengal; India
- Coordinates: 22°51′05″N 88°23′43″E
- Elevation: 14 metres (46 ft)
- System: Kolkata Suburban Railway station
- Owner: Indian Railways
- Operator: Eastern Railway
- Line: Sealdah–Ranaghat line of Kolkata Suburban Railway
- Platforms: 4
- Tracks: 4

Construction
- Structure type: Standard on ground station
- Parking: Not available
- Cycle facilities: Not available

Other information
- Status: Functional
- Station code: JGDL
- Zone(s): Eastern Railway
- Division(s): Sealdah

History
- Opened: 1950; 76 years ago
- Electrified: 1963–1965; 61 years ago
- Former names: Eastern Bengal Railway

Services
Preceding station	Kolkata Suburban Railway	Following station
Shyamnagar towards Sealdah	Eastern Line Main line	Kankinara towards Ranaghat Junction
Route map
Location
- Location within West Bengal Location within India

Jagaddal railway station is the railway station on Sealdah–Ranaghat line of Kolkata Suburban Railway. It is situated at the town of Jagatdal. It serves the local areas of Jagatdal in North 24 Parganas district, West Bengal, India.

== History ==
The Sealdah–Kusthia line of the Eastern Bengal Railway was opened to railway traffic in the year 1862. Eastern Bengal Railway used to work only on the eastern side of the Hooghly River.

== Station complex ==
The platform is not very well sheltered. It has many facilities including water and sanitation. There is no proper approach road to this station.

== Electrification ==
The Sealdah–Ranaghat sector was electrified in 1963–65.
