= Halisahar =

- City
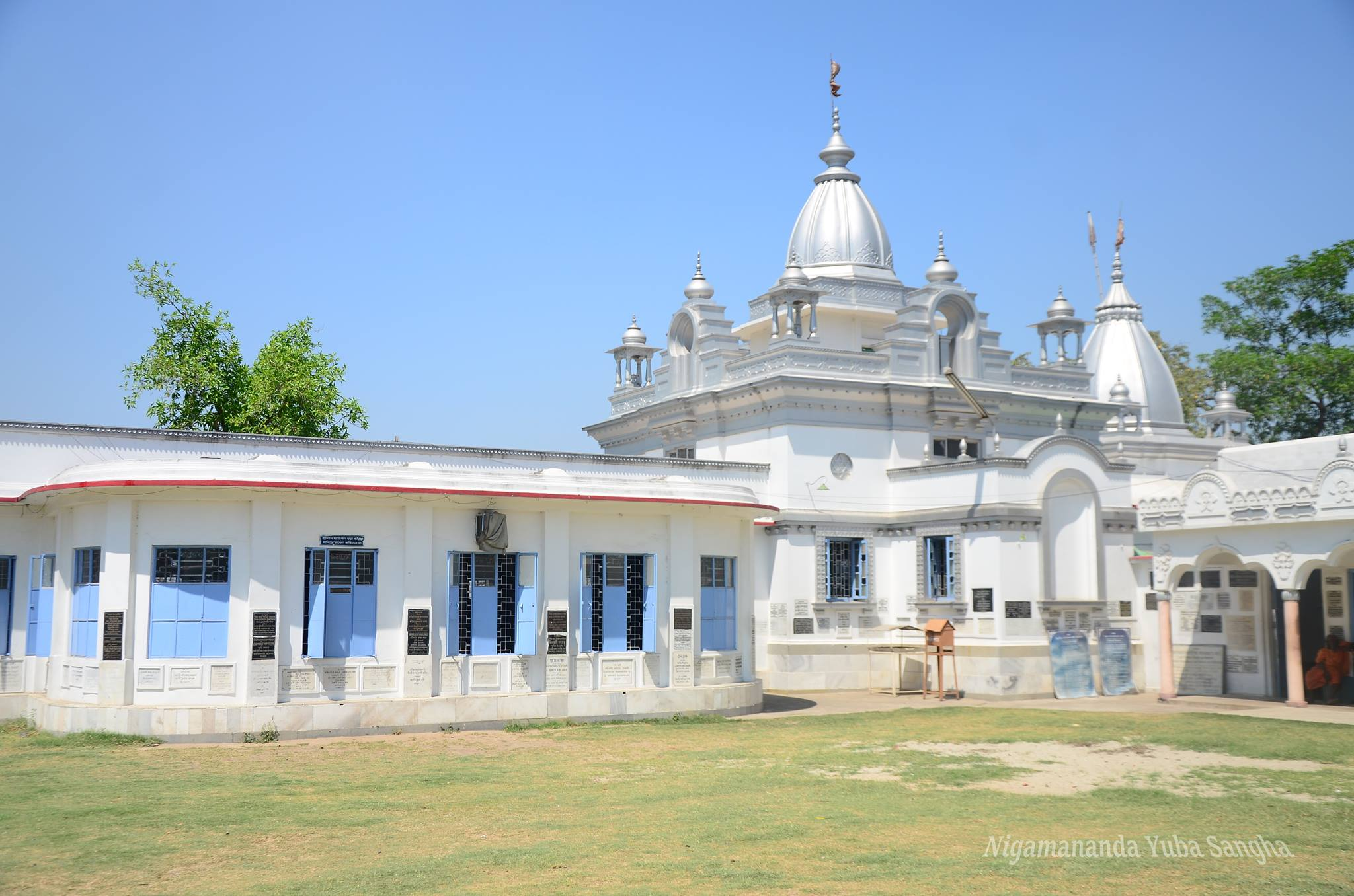
- Assam-Bongiyo Saraswat Math (Nigamananda Ashram), Halisahar

- Location in West Bengal, India Halisahar (India)
- Coordinates: 22.946944°N 88.418389°E
- Country: India
- State: West Bengal
- Division: Presidency
- District: North 24 Parganas

Government
  - Type: Municipality
  - Body: Halisahar Municipality
  - Chairman: Vacant

Area
  - Total: 8.29 km^{2} (3.20 sq mi)
- Elevation: 15 m (49 ft)

Population (2011)
  - Total: 124,939
  - Density: 15,100/km^{2} (39,000/sq mi)

Languages
  - Official: Bengali
  - Additional official: English
- Time zone: UTC+5:30 (IST)
- PIN: 743134
- Telephone code: +91 33
- Vehicle registration: WB
- Lok Sabha constituency: Barrackpore
- Vidhan Sabha constituency: Bijpur
- Website: halisaharmunicipality.org

Halisahar is a city and a municipality of North 24 Parganas district in the Indian state of West Bengal. It is a part of the area covered by Kolkata Metropolitan Development Authority (KMDA).

== History ==
Halisahar is believed to have existed from the early Middle Ages. It was earlier named Kumarhatta. It had also been the residence of Pachu Shakti Khan, the cavalry commander of Humayun. In the 13th century, during the reign of Baktiyar Khilji it was known as Haveli Shahar (City of Palaces). In the 16th century, Abul Fazal's Ain-i-Akbari mentioned it as 'Halisahar'. The municipality was established in 1903.

== Geography ==
Cities and towns in the northern portion of Barrackpore subdivision in North 24 Parganas district
M: municipal city/ town, CT: census town,
N: neighbourhood, OG: outgrowth
Owing to space constraints in the small map, the actual locations in a larger map may vary slightly

=== Location ===
With a total area of 8.29 km^{2} (3.20 sq mi) Halisahar forms a small part of the state of West Bengal. There is a significant difference in elevation across different localities of Halisahar. There are significantly large numbers of ponds in Halisahar. Most of them are shallow. Moreover, it is adjacent to the river Ganga and therefore, Halisahar has abundant with water resources. Halisahar falls under the earthquake zone 3.

Halisahar is bounded by Kanchrapara in North 24 Parganas and Kalyani in Nadia district, on the north, Nanna on the east, Balibhara and Naihati on the south and the Hooghly River on the west. It also shares some area in common with Kanchrapara.

96% of the population of Barrackpore subdivision (partly presented in the map alongside) live in urban areas. In 2011, it had a density of population of 10,967 per km^{2} The subdivision has 16 municipalities and 24 census towns.

For most of the cities/ towns information regarding density of population is available in the Infobox. Population data is not available for neighbourhoods. It is available for the entire municipal area and thereafter ward-wise.

All places marked on the map are linked in the full-screen map.

=== Police station ===
Halisahar police station under Barrackpore Police Commissionerate has jurisdiction over Halisahar Municipal area.

=== Post office ===
Halisahar has a sub-post office with PIN 743134 in the North Presidency Division of North 24 Parganas district in Calcutta region. Halisahar has many other Post Offices like- Nabanagar Sub-post Office (PIN 743136), Malancha Post Office (PIN 743135), Lalkuthi Post Office, Hazinagar Post Office. No other post office has the same PIN.

=== Climate ===
The main seasons are summer, rainy season, a short autumn, and winter. The summer in the delta region is noted for excessive humidity, with the highest day temperature ranging from 38 °C (100 °F) to 45 °C (113 °F). In early summer brief squalls and thunderstorms known as Kalbaisakhi or Norwesters, often occur. In the year 2018 Halisahar recorded strongest kalbaisakhi in which storm was about 100 km/h and 51 mm of rain on 13 May. Halisahar receives the Bay of Bengal branch of the Indian Ocean monsoon that moves in the northwest direction. Winter (December–January) is mild with average minimum temperatures of 19 °C (66.2 °F). A cold and dry northern wind blows in the winter, substantially lowering the humidity level.

== Demographics ==
=== Population ===
Historical population
Year	Pop.	±%
1911	13,423	—
1921	7,318	−45.5%
1931	16,770	+129.2%
1941	25,804	+53.9%
1951	34,666	+34.3%
1961	51,423	+48.3%
1971	68,906	+34.0%
1981	99,366	+44.2%
1991	117,539	+18.3%
2001	130,621	+11.1%
2011	124,939	−4.3%
Source: Census of India

As per the 2011 Census of India, Halisahar had a total population of 124,939, of which 65,467 (52%) were males and 59,472 (48%) were females. Population below 6 years was 11,138. The total number of literates in Halisahar was 100,560 (88.36% of the population over 6 years).

As of 2001, India census, Halisahar had a population of 124,479. Males constitute 54% of the population and females 46%. Halisahar has an average literacy rate of 76%, higher than the national average of 59.5%: male literacy is 81%, and female literacy is 70%. In Halisahar, 10% of the population is under 6 years of age.

=== Languages ===
Languages spoken in Halisahar City (2011)
1. Bengali (64.6%)
2. Hindi (24.2%)
3. Murgi (8.47%)
4. Odia (1.22%)
5. Bhojpuri (1.10%)
6. Others (0.38%)

=== Kolkata Urban Agglomeration ===
The following Municipalities, Census Towns and other locations in Barrackpore subdivision were part of Kolkata Urban Agglomeration in the 2011 census: Kanchrapara (M), Jetia (CT), Halisahar (M), Balibhara (CT), Naihati (M), Bhatpara (M), Kaugachhi (CT), Garshyamnagar (CT), Garulia (M), Ichhapur Defence Estate (CT), North Barrackpur (M), Barrackpur Cantonment (CB), Barrackpore (M), Jafarpur (CT), Ruiya (CT), Titagarh (M), Khardaha (M), Bandipur (CT), Panihati (M), Muragachha (CT) New Barrackpore (M), Chandpur (CT), Talbandha (CT), Patulia (CT), Kamarhati (M), Baranagar (M), South Dumdum (M), North Dumdum (M), Dum Dum (M), Noapara (CT), Babanpur (CT), Teghari (CT), Nanna (OG), Chakla (OG), Srotribati (OG) and Panpur (OG).

== Infrastructure ==
As per the District Census Handbook 2011, Halisahar Municipal city covered an area of 8.29 km^{2}. Amongst the civic amenities it had 163.7 km of roads and open drains. Amongst the medical facilities It had 1 charitable medical facility and 66 medicine shops. Amongst the educational facilities It had 64 primary schools, 1 middle school, 4 secondary schools, 6 senior secondary schools and 7 non-formal education centres. Amongst the social, recreational and cultural facilities it had 1 stadium, 1 auditorium/ community hall, 1 cinema/theatre and 3 public libraries. Amongst the commodities manufactured were jute and paper. It had 6 bank branches.

According to the Barrackpore administration, amongst the educational facilities available at Halisahar are 59 primary schools, 4 secondary schools, 6 higher secondary schools and 5 private English-medium schools. Amongst the other facilities available are 6 markets, 2 ferry ghats (Dunlop Sahaganj Ghat and Paper Mill Ghat), 1 cinema hall (Charu Chitramandir), 1 open stage (Halisahar Lok Sanskriti Bhaban), 3 libraries, 10 play grounds, 1 electric crematorium, 1 burning ghat, 3 Muslim burial grounds and 2 parks (Hali Craig Park and Nutan Bazar Park). There are water connections in 13,880 houses, and 1,875 street taps.

See also Cities and towns in Barrackpore subdivision

== Economy ==
=== Industry ===
Industrialisation started in the Halisahar area in the early years of the twentieth century with the setting up of jute mills and pulp and paper mills on the banks of the Hooghly river. The fortunes of the jute industry have declined but two mills are still functional in Halisahar. Naihati Jute Mills set up its first factory at Hazinagar in 1905. It was taken over by the Bhagat family in 1958. J.K. Bhagat has been at the helm of affairs for the last 45 years. Hukumchand Jute Mill was established at Hazinagar in 1919 and is still functioning.

=== KMDA ===
Halisahar Municipality is included in the Kolkata Metropolitan Area for which the KMDA is the statutory planning and development authority.

== Transport ==
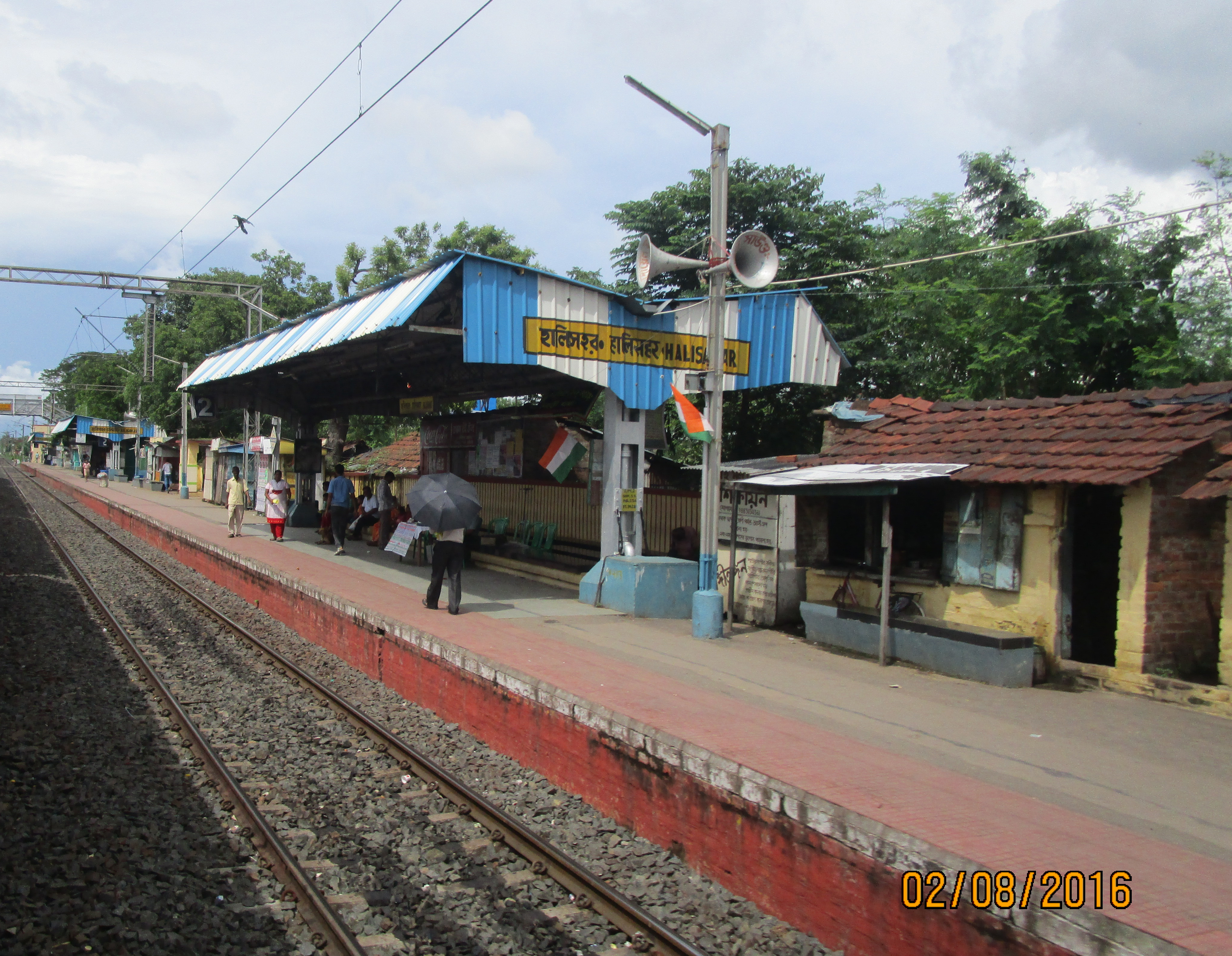
Halisahar railway station

State Highway 1 passes through Halisahar.

Halisahar railway station on the Sealdah-Ranaghat line is 42 km from Sealdah railway station. It is part of the Kolkata Suburban Railway system.

=== Commuters ===
Around a total of 3.2 million people from all around the city commute to Kolkata daily for work. In the Sealdah-Krishnanagar section there are 34 trains that carry commuters from 30 railway stations. In the Sealdah-Shantipur section 32 trains carry commuters from 29 stations.

== Healthcare ==
There is a Nanna Block Primary Health Center. There is also a Municipal Maternity-cum-Child Welfare Hospital functions with 10 beds.

== Notable people ==
- Ramprasad Sen, a Shakta poet and saint of eighteenth century Bengal, died here.
- Rani Rashmoni, founder of Dakshineswar temple, was born here.
- Bipin Behari Ganguli, an activist of the Indian independence movement, was born here.
- Raj Chakraborty, director of Bengali films in Tollywood, was a native but chose to do politics from Barrackpore.
