= Barrackpore Police Commissionerate =

Police commissionerate in West Bengal

Barrackpore Police Commissionerate ব্যারাকপুর পুলিশ কমিশনারেট
- Emblem of Barrackpore Police
- Common name: Barrackpore Police
- Abbreviation: BKPC / BPC
- Motto: Courage Care Commitment (Bengali: সাহস সতর্কতা প্রতিজ্ঞাবদ্ধ)

Agency overview
- Formed: 20 January 2012
- Annual budget: ₹236.29 crore (US$25.2 million) (2025–26)

Jurisdictional structure
- Operations jurisdiction: Roughly Barrackpore subdivision, West Bengal, IN
- Map of Barrackpore Police Commissionerate's jurisdiction
- Area: 335.80 km^{2} (129.65 sq mi)
- Population: 36,70,000+ (2011 census)
- Legal jurisdiction: As per operations jurisdiction
- Governing body: Department of Home and Hill Affairs, Government of West Bengal
- General nature: Local civilian police

Operational structure
- Headquarters: BT Road, Barrackpore, Kolkata ‍–‍ 700120
- Police officers: 5,200+ (2023)
- Civic Volunteers: 2,700+ (2019)
- Elected officer responsible: Suvendu Adhikari, Chief Minister of West Bengal
- Agency executive: Amit Kr Singh, IPS, Commissioner of Police
- Parent agency: West Bengal Police

Facilities
- Offices: Police Stations: 25; Traffic Guards: 8

Website
- Official Website

Barrackpore Police Commissionerate (Bengali: ব্যারাকপুর পুলিশ কমিশনারেট), established on 20 January 2012, is a city police force with primary responsibilities in law enforcement and investigation within the area which roughly constitutes the Barrackpore subdivision, and is located within the northern part of Kolkata metropolitan area. The Commissionerate is part of the West Bengal Police and is under the administrative control of Home Ministry of West Bengal. It was formed after the bifurcation of the North 24 Parganas Police District, and has 25 police stations under its jurisdiction. Sanjoy Mukherjee was appointed as the first Commissioner of the Barrackpore Police Commissionerate.

== Structure and jurisdiction ==
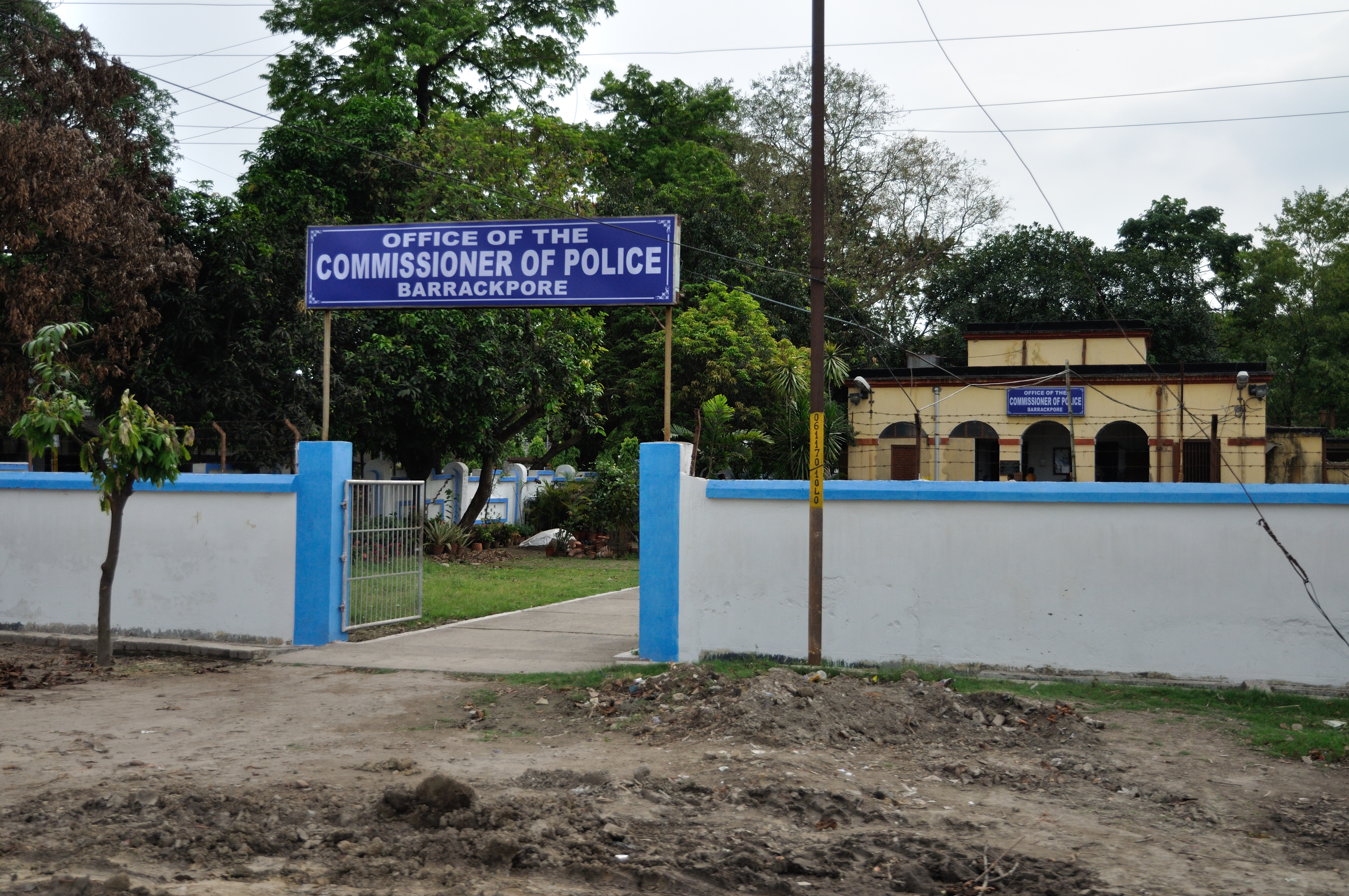
The Barrackpore police commissioner's office on Barrackpore Trunk road.

The police commissionerate is situated at Barrackpore, and is divided into three zones – North, Central and South. The Commissionerate is responsible for law enforcement over an area of 335.80 square kilometres (129.65 sq mi) area with 25 police stations under it. The Commissionerate is headed by the Commissioner of Police, who is an Indian Police Service officer either in the rank of DIG-P or Inspector-General of Police (IGP).

The commissioner is assisted by DCP Headquarters, DCP DD . There are three deputy commissioners for the three divisions. Other departments, including the detective department and the special branch are headed by deputy commissioners. The police stations are headed by an Inspector.

=== Ranks ===
Command hierarchy of Barrackpore Police Commissionerate under West Bengal Police
Level	Positions	Abbreviation	Corresponding / substantive rank	Service	Role
1	Commissioner of Police	CP	Additional director general of police	IPS	Chief of the Commissionerate
1	Commissioner of Police	CP	Inspector general of police	IPS	Chief of the Commissionerate
1	Commissioner of Police	CP	Deputy inspector general of police	IPS	Chief of the Commissionerate
2	Deputy Commissioner of Police	DCP	Senior superintendent of police	IPS	Head of a territorial zone (North, Central, and South) or other specialised units (Detective, Enforcement, Traffic, etc.)
2	Deputy Commissioner of Police	DCP	Superintendent of police	IPS/WBPS	Head of a territorial zone (North, Central, and South) or other specialised units (Detective, Enforcement, Traffic, etc.)
3	Additional Deputy Commissioner of Police	Addl. DCP	Additional superintendent of police	IPS/WBPS	Assists a DCP and supervises specialised branches or units
4	Assistant Commissioner of Police	ACP	Deputy Superintendent of Police	IPS/WBPS	Head a group of police stations and assists DCP.
5	Inspector-in-Charge	IC	Inspector	WBP	Commander of the local police station.
5	Officer-in-Charge	OC	Sub-Inspector	WBP	Commander of the local police station.
6	Inspector	Insp.	Inspector	WBP	Commands local units, such as Traffic Guard etc.
7	Sub-Inspector	SI	Sub-Inspector	WBP	Assist the Inspector or commands local units, such as Traffic Guard, etc.
8	Assistant Sub-Inspector	ASI	Assistant Sub-Inspector	WBP	Supervisor in certain field units such as Traffic Guard, Passport Verification, Detective, Armed Police, etc.
9	Constable / Lady Constable / Wireless Operator	Const.	Constable	WBP	Entry-level officer.

== Police stations ==
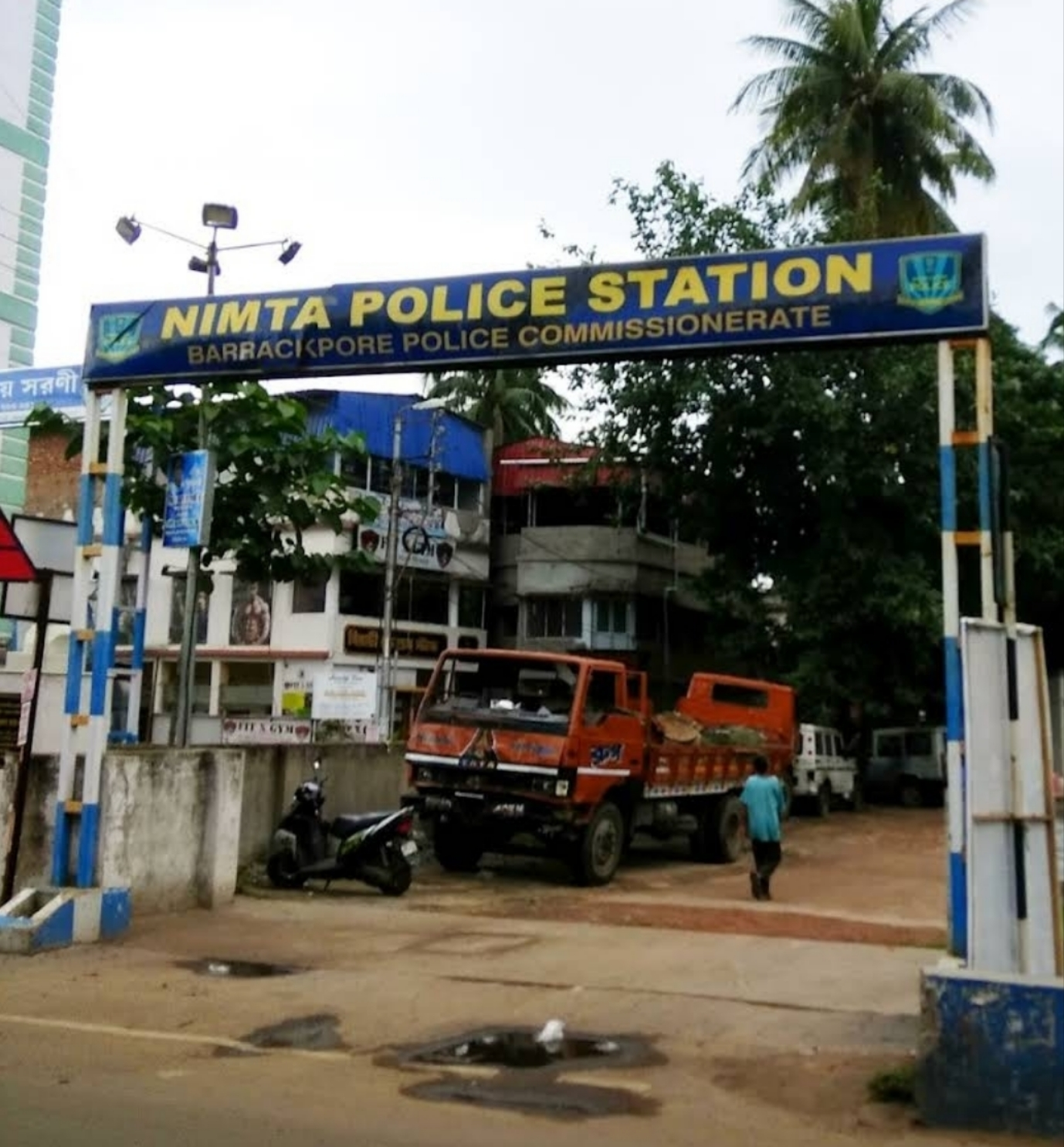
Nimta Police Station in North Dum Dum

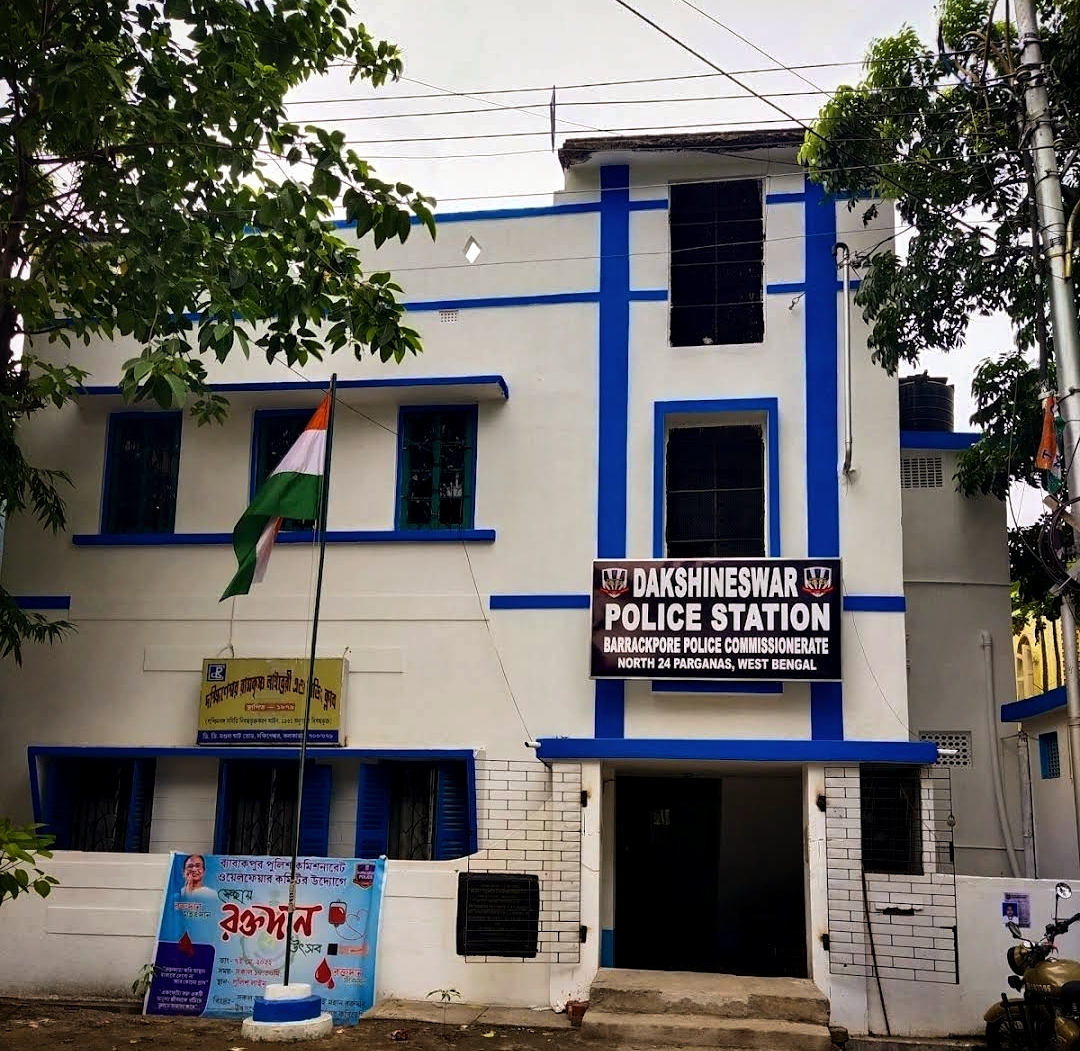
Dakshineswar police station in Kamarhati

Police stations in Barrackpore Police Commissionerate have the following features and jurisdiction:

Police stations (PS)	Established	Area covered	Zone	SHO rank	Ref.
Bizpore PS	‍–‍	Kanchrapara	North	Inspector (IC)	
Halisahar PS	10 March 2022	Halisahar	North	Inspector (IC)	(Note: Bifurcated from areas of Bizpore and Naihati Police Stations.)
Naihati PS	‍–‍	Naihati	North	Inspector (IC)	
Bhatpara PS	14 June 2019	Bhatpara (north)	North	Inspector (IC)	(Note: Bifurcated from areas of Jagatdal Police Station.)
Jagaddal PS	‍–‍	Bhatpara (south part), Jagatdal, Shyamnagar (west part)	North	Inspector (IC)	
Noapara PS	‍–‍	Garulia, North Barrackpur (Ichapore, Palta neighbourhoods)	North	Inspector (IC)	
Basudevpur PS	10 March 2022	Basudebpur, Shyamnagar (east part)	North	Inspector (IC)	(Note: Bifurcated from areas of Bhatpara Police Station.)
Jetia PS	10 March 2022	Jetia, Palladaha, Nagdaha, Palashi	North	Sub-Inspector (OC)	(Note: Bifurcated from areas of Bizpore and Naihati Police Stations.)
Shibdaspur PS	10 March 2022	Barrackpore I (larger part)	North	Sub-Inspector (OC)	(Note: Bifurcated from areas of Naihati Police Station.)
Barrackpore PS	‍–‍	North Barrackpur (south part), Barrackpur Cantonment	Central	Inspector (IC)	
Titagarh PS	‍–‍	Barrackpore, Titagarh	Central	Inspector (IC)	
Khardaha PS	‍–‍	Khardaha, Panihati (west), Agarpara	Central	Inspector (IC)	
Rahara PS	22 November 2019	Rahara (Khardaha west area), Patulia, Bandipur	Central	Inspector (IC)	(Note: Bifurcated from areas of Khardaha Police Station.)
Ghola PS	‍–‍	Ghola, Panihati (east partly), Bilkanda	Central	Inspector (IC)	(Note: Bifurcated from areas of Khardaha Police Station.)
New Barrackpore PS	2 March 2015	New Barrackpore	Central	Inspector (IC)	(Note: Bifurcated from areas of Ghola Police Station.)
Mohanpur PS	10 March 2022	Mohanpur, Sewli-Telenipara (incl. West Nilganj area) (Note: East Nilganj is controlled with administrative jurisdiction at Barasat Sadar subdivision.)	Central	Sub-Inspector (OC)	(Note: Bifurcated from areas of Titagarh Police Station.)
Dum Dum PS	‍–‍	Dum Dum, South Dum Dum (partly)	South	Inspector (IC)	
Nimta PS	‍–‍	North Dum Dum (Birati and Nimta) (Note: Kolkata Airport area (both NSCBIA PS and Airport PS) are controlled by Bidhannagar City Police under Barrackpore subdivision.)	South	Inspector (IC)	
Baranagar PS	‍–‍	Baranagar (central part)	South	Inspector (IC)	
Belgharia PS	21 February 1963	Belgharia	South	Inspector (IC)	(Note: Bifurcated from areas of Belgharia Police Station.)
Nagerbazar PS	10 March 2022	South Dum Dum (Nagerbazar; except Lake Town) (Note: Lake Town PS is controlled by Bidhannagar City Police with administrative jurisdiction under Barrackpore subdivision.)	South	Inspector (IC)	(Note: Bifurcated from areas of Dum Dum Police Station.)
Kamarhati PS	14 April 2022	Kamarhati (east)	South	Sub-Inspector (OC)	(Note: Bifurcated from areas of Belgharia Police Station.)
Dakshineswar PS	14 April 2022	Dakshineswar area	South	Sub-Inspector (OC)	(Note: Bifurcated from areas of Belgharia Police Station.)
Women PS	7 February 2014	Entire Barrackpore Police area	Detective	Inspector (IC)	
Cyber Crime PS	30 January 2015	Entire Barrackpore Police area	Detective	Inspector (IC)	

== Traffic Guard ==
Under the Traffic Zone of Barrackpore Police Commissionerate, it has established 8 Traffic Guards as follows:

Traffic/Sub-Traffic Guard (TG/STG)	PS Jurisdiction
Kampa STG	Bizpore PS
Authpur TG	Jagatdal PS
Barrackpore TG	Titagarh PS
Sodepur STG	Khardaha PS
Nimta TG	Nimta PS
South TG	Belgharia PS
Dunlop STG	Baranagar PS
Nagerbazar STG	Nagerbazar PS

== See also ==
- Howrah Police Commissionerate
- Bidhannagar Police Commissionerate
- Kolkata Police
- West Bengal Police
