= Rahara, Kolkata =

Rahara
- Neighbourhood
- Location in West Bengal, India Rahara (India)
- Coordinates: 22.723703°N 88.381622°E
- Country: India
- State: West Bengal
- Division: Presidency
- District: North 24 Parganas

Government
  - Type: Municipality
  - Body: Khardaha Municipality
- Elevation: 12 m (39 ft)

Languages
  - Official: Bengali, English
- Time zone: UTC+5:30 (IST)
- PIN: 700118
- Telephone code: +91 33
- ISO 3166 code: IN-WB
- Vehicle registration: WB
- Lok Sabha constituency: Dum Dum
- Vidhan Sabha constituency: Khardaha

Rahara is a neighbourhood in Khardaha of North 24 Parganas district in the Indian state of West Bengal. It is a part of the area covered by Kolkata Metropolitan Development Authority (KMDA).

== Geography ==
Rahara is located at 22°43′25″N 88°22′53″E. It has an average elevation of 12 m (39 ft).

== Education ==
- Rahara Bhabanath Institution for Girls
- Rahara Ramakrishna Mission Boys' Home High School, Junior High School and Junior Basic School
- Ramakrishna Mission Vivekananda Centenary College
- Kalyannagar Vidyapith
- Kalyannagar Vidyapith For Girls

== Transport ==
Sodepur Road (Old Calcutta Road) passes through Rahara. It is also connected to B.T. Road.

=== Private Bus ===
- 78/1 Rahara Bazar - Babughat

=== Train ===
Khardaha railway station on Sealdah-Ranaghat line is the nearest railway station.
