= West Bengal floods =

West Bengal floods may refer to these floods in the Indian state of West Bengal:

- 2017 West Bengal floods
- 2024 West Bengal floods
