= Syndicate Raj =

Form of organized corruption started in late 2000s in West Bengal

Syndicate Raj (Syndicate Regime) is an organized form of running corrupt extortion rackets, mostly in the manufacturing and construction sectors, that became prevalent in late 2000s in West Bengal. A small group of people, known as syndicates, started controlling any large monetary transactions including selling of land, construction of buildings, buying of material goods. These people, often connected to the ruling political party, demand a share of any large transaction happening in an area.

These practices mostly happen in the construction business, but have recently spread to most sphere of life including building individual residential houses. Corrupt groups often also force builders and consumers to buy from a particular vendor, connected to the same groups and political party officials. Sometimes, this leads to supply of inferior quality materials at a premium price. The Kolkata flyover collapse has been also linked to low quality raw materials supplied by such syndicates. The Narada sting operation exposes close links of syndicates to the top party officials of AITC, showing party leaders taking large sums of money from an unknown businessman.

== History ==
The Left-front government used to interfere with most local affairs in West Bengal during their tenure. The leaders of the Left-front parties, including the CPI(M), used to monitor local constructions and businesses. However, the top leaders kept a check on the local leaders and groups, not to be involved with any business transactions. Rather, the businesses used to officially donate to party-funds. Still, there were a very few local leaders who used to make money by charging to the businesses.

A few years before Trinamool (AITC) came to power in West Bengal in 2011, the local AITC party leaders became very powerful in their areas. The leaders started demanding a share of money for any building constructions happening in that area. Slowly, multiple groups started emerging in individual areas, connected to multiple local AITC leaders. When AITC finally won 2011 Legislative Assembly election and started their term, the whole syndicate business flourished.

== Tactics ==
A local leader of AITC employs a group of unemployed people to run the racket. The racket is called syndicate. Wherever a real-estate business is constructing a building, or a company wants to open up a new factory, or even a family wants to buy material goods for building a home, the syndicate appears and inquires about the activity. Then, they force the company or the family to take the raw-materials for the construction from a particular vendor that they operate, at a higher rate than the market rate.

If the consumer does not agree to buy from them, then they demand large sums of money for the construction. In case the company complains to the local police, the local and top AITC party officials control the police to prevent taking any action by them. In addition, the local administration forces the company to bend to the demands of the syndicates.

Recently, the syndicate business has grown to college admissions. Student-wing of AITC demands money to the newly admitted freshers in colleges in West Bengal. They often intimidate the students if they do not succumb to their monetary demands.

Mamata Banerjee, the founder of AITC and the Chief Minister of West Bengal, has told party officials to control their rackets.

=== School Teacher Jobs ===
State government jobs have been one of the most active areas of syndicate rackets. In 2022, the School Service Commission (SSC) scam was revealed, exposing the syndicate business in the education sector. The education minister of West Bengal, Partha Chatterjee was accused of taking large sums of money in exchange of providing government school teacher jobs to individuals, bypassing the rigorous examination system for SSC jobs and was later arrested. Although there used to be such allegations against the previous Left-front government, there was no proofs of a large-scale corruption and party-level involvements. On the contrary, SSC jobs were one of the few honest ways many poor and middle-class families used to get a government job in order to achieve a respectable standard of living.

Even though Chief Minister Mamata Banerjee was also accused but no investigation could prove her direct involvements in this scam. In relation to this, it is important to mention that former education minister Partha Chatterjee was one of the intimate confidantes of Mamata Banerjee.

=== Healthcare ===
Syndicate business seeped into public hospitals and medical colleges. In the course of events following 2024 Kolkata rape and murder incident, it was revealed that Sandip Ghosh ex-Principal of R G Kar Medical College and Hospital, along with Dr. Avik De, Dr Birupaksha Biswas, Sudipto Roy, Dr Susanta Roy and many other tmcp student wing PGT, House staff, Interns and even Mbbs students are involved in illegal business dealings involving the laundering donated kidneys, corpse and other medical subjects. CBI was instructed by the Indian Supreme Court to investigate the matter, starting with financial irregularities during the tenure of Dr. Ghosh. Some of the media is calling it a "health syndicate".

== See also ==
- Extortion
- Abusive power and control
- Protection racket
