= 2019 India doctors' strike =

Doctor's strike in India in 2019

2019 Indian doctors' strike
- Date: 11 June 2019 – 17 June 2019 (7 days)
- Location: India
- Caused by: Lack of security in government hospitals and Assault on two junior doctors at NRSMCH
- Goals: Providing security for medical professionals Public apology from the Chief Minister of West Bengal
- Methods: Strike; Protest march; Sit-in
- Status: Stalled
- Result: Successful

Parties
Doctors and medical associations across India	Government of West Bengal

Lead figures
Various	Mamata Banerjee, Chief Minister of West Bengal

Casualties
- Injuries: 2 junior doctors
- Arrested: 5 people

On 11 June 2019, following the assault of two junior doctors at Nil Ratan Sircar Medical College and Hospital (NRSMCH) the previous night, junior doctors in Kolkata began protesting and demanded that the Chief Minister of West Bengal, Mamata Banerjee, should intervene and provide adequate security to medical professionals. The protests caused a collapse of healthcare facilities in the state. Protests continued through 13 June, despite attempts at mediation, resulting in the chief minister issuing an ultimatum to the protesting doctors. The doctors ignored the ultimatum, asking the government to meet their demands for security and for the chief minister to give them a public apology.

== Background ==
=== Historical incidents ===
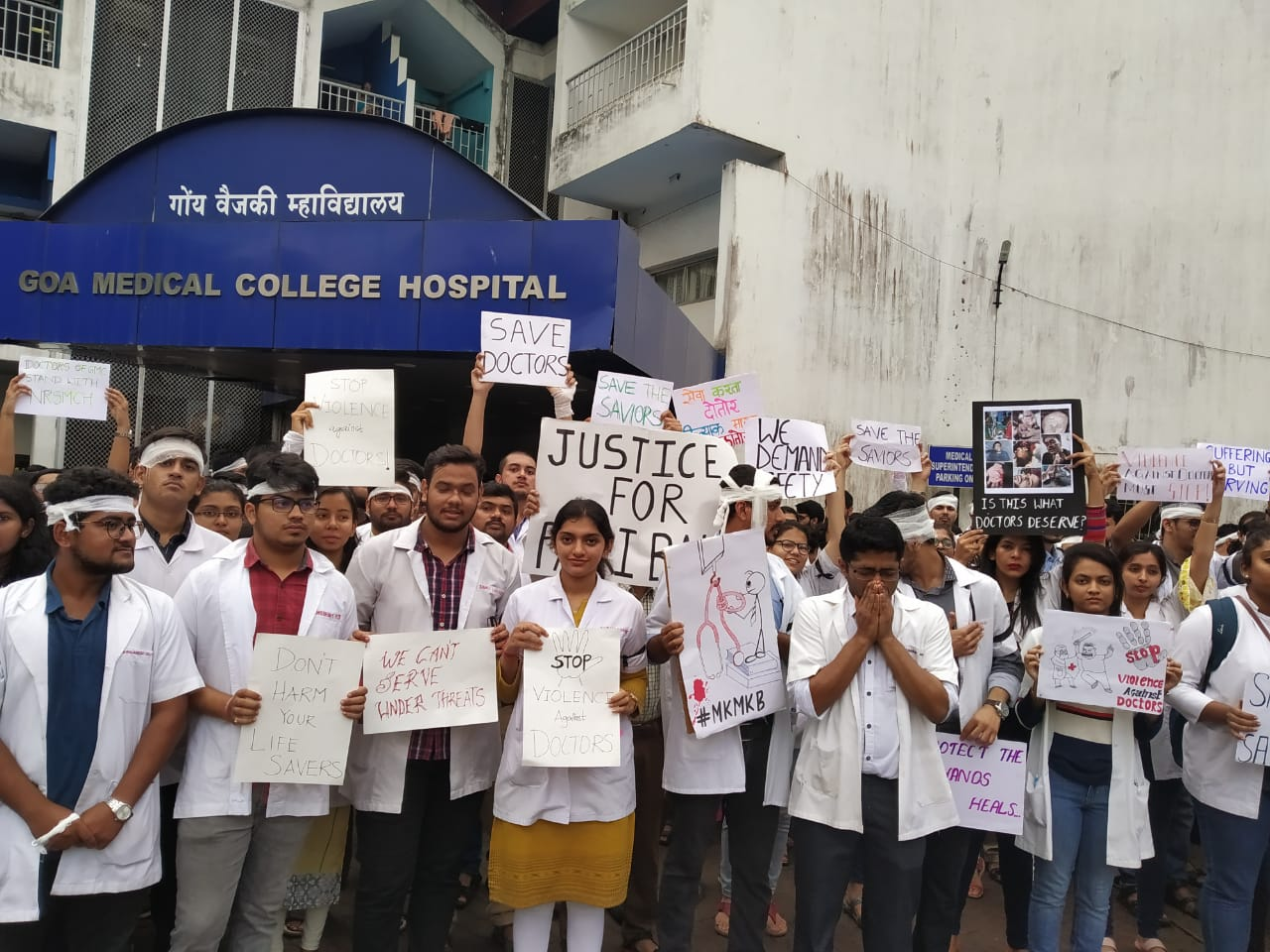
Doctors' protest demanding justice for a fellow doctor who was a victim of mob violence

According to an Indian Medical Association survey, due to the increasing reports of violence against doctors, the main source of stress for doctors was fear of violence, followed by the fear of being sued. 62% of the doctors who answered the survey reported that they were unable to see their patients without any fear of violence, and 57% had also considered hiring security staff at their workplace.

When healthcare workers were assaulted, they frequently resorted to peaceful strikes, which sometimes included termination of ward and emergency services. During such protests, it was not uncommon for the public to attack the protesters.

In a tertiary care hospital in Delhi, 40% of the doctors reported being exposed to violence in the last year. The point of delivery of emergency services was the most common place of violence and verbal abuse was the most common form of violence. The most common symptoms experienced by the doctors who were subjected to violence were anger, frustration and irritability. Out of those who were exposed to violence, only 44% reported the incidents to the authorities.

Instances of assaulting medical professionals in government and private hospitals is common in West Bengal and India.

In an incident in early June 2019, a case was registered against a 17-year-old boy and his friend for allegedly assaulting a doctor at a hospital in Maharashtra after his father died during treatment. Even earlier in April 2019, the administration of the Kaushal Sharma Hospital filed a police complaint against the relative of a patient who slapped a doctor.

=== Origin of protests ===
Another of these incidents occurred on the night of 10 June 2019 after Mohammed Shaheed, a 75-year-old patient from Tangra, Calcutta, died at NRS Medical College. Eleven relatives of the deceased were upset over the patient's death and alleged that he died due to medical negligence. They claimed that the body of the deceased was not handed over to them on time. Staff at the hospital stated that the relatives also misbehaved with junior doctors. Shortly after, a mob reached NRSMCH at around 11 pm (UTC+05:30) and fought with the junior doctors. The clashes turned the premises into a "battleground" at night and the morning after as doctors at the facility alleged that over 200 people arrived on trucks to assault doctors and destroy hospital property. Another account states that the people arrived in cars wearing helmets to attack doctors at the hospital. Two intern doctors, Paribaha Mukhopadhyay and Yash Tekwani, who were dealing with the protests by the deceased patient's relatives, were injured in the ensuing clashes. Yash was admitted at NRSMCH with Paribaha being admitted in an intensive care unit at the Institute of Neurosciences in Kolkata after they both suffered head injuries. Paribaha suffered a deep dent in the frontal bone as suggested by a CT scan image uploaded by doctors at the hospital.

== Protests ==
=== Day 1: 11 June 2019 ===
On 11 June 2019, at least 50 intern doctors closed the gates of the NRSMCH to protest against the attack on the two junior doctors and demanded that the Chief Minister of West Bengal, Mamata Banerjee, takes adequate action and provides security to doctors. The doctors alleged that the police took no action after the two junior doctors were assaulted the previous night. The West Bengal Doctors' Forum proposed to stop all work at the outpatient departments of all state-run hospitals in West Bengal from the next day. A member of the forum also added that emergency services would remain active at all hospitals.

=== Day 2: 12 June 2019 ===
As protests entered the second day on 12 June 2019, patients across West Bengal were left without healthcare as junior doctors continued with the strike. On the same day, the agitation of intern doctors at the NRSMCH spilled over to all thirteen state-run hospitals and medical colleges in the city and at least six other district hospitals, causing disruption of regular medical services. Affected hospitals included the Calcutta National Medical College Hospital, Calcutta Medical College and Hospital, SSKM Hospital, R G Kar Hospital, and medical colleges in Murshidabad, Midnapore, North Bengal and Bankura. All departments, including outpatient departments and pathological laboratories were shut down following the protests of the junior doctors. Protestors said that work will not resume at the hospitals until full protection is given to medical professionals. Contrary to statements by the Doctors' Forum, emergency wards in at least three state-run hospitals, NRSMCH, SSKM Hospital and Burdwan Medical College remained closed.

==== Mediation ====
West Bengal Medical Council (WBMC) president and AITC MLA Nirmal Maji told Press Trust of India (PTI) that officials were trying to convince the doctors to resume work. While the protestors requested direct intervention from the chief minister, Mamata Banerjee, only her deputy, Chandrima Bhattacharya, Minister of State for Health, visited NRSMCH. There were meetings between doctors and representatives of the state government. A spokesperson for the government stated that the Chief Minister was herself monitoring the situation. Mamata Banerjee's nephew, MP Abhishek Banerjee also appealed to the doctors to resume work. However, mediation was not successful and protests continued.

==== Planned protests ====
Medical associations across the country threatened to strike on 14 June to protest over the rising violence against doctors, which is predicted to hit medical services across the country. All India Institute of Medical Sciences (AIIMS) Resident Doctors' Association declared a boycott on 14 June in line with the directions of the Indian Medical Association (IMA) which directed all its state branches to stage protests and wear black badges on the day. The IMA asked state presidents and secretaries to organise demonstrations at their respective district collectors' officers between 10 am and 12 noon. The Delhi Medical Association (DMA) also called for a full medical strike on the day to protest against the assault of the doctors.

=== Day 3: 13 June 2019 ===
As protests entered the third day on 13 June 2019, all outpatient departments of government hospitals remained closed, with only senior doctors manning emergency wards and outpatient departments at SSKM Hospital in Kolkata and Burdwan Medical College. Despite the ultimatum, protests continued with junior doctors stating that the agitation will continue until their demands for security and a public apology from the Chief Minister are met. Resident doctors at the AIIMS Delhi worked on 13 June with bandages on their heads as a symbolic protest.

==== Ultimatum ====
On 13 June 2019, the Chief Minister of West Bengal, Mamata Banerjee issued an ultimatum to the doctors on strike to return to work within 4 hours (by 2 pm local time). She made the statement while visiting the state-run SSKM Hospital to talk to the junior doctors on strike. Speaking about the doctors, she said, "They are outsiders. The government will not support them in any way. I condemn doctors who have gone on strike. Policemen die in line of duty but the police don't go on a strike," further adding that the strike will not be tolerated.

==== Resignations ====
At late night, the principal and medical superintendent of NRSMCH, Professor Saibal Mukherjee and Professor Sourav Chatterjee stepped down from their positions. They submitted their resignation via email to the state director of medical education.

=== Day 4: 14 June 2019 ===
On 14 June 2019, the DMA organized a statewide medical strike in Delhi. Resident doctors at AIIMS New Delhi and Safdarjung Hospital boycotted their work. In Maharashtra, around 4,500 resident doctors suspended outpatient departments, wards and diagnostic services from 8 am to 5 pm. Emergency services at either places were not hampered. Doctors also staged a protest at the Nizam's Institute of Medical Sciences in Hyderabad. Protests in West Bengal went into the fourth day as outdoor facilities, emergency wards and pathological wards of many state-run hospitals remained closed. More than 700 doctors resigned from state-run hospitals, with dozens of doctors from Darjeeling and Kolkata resigning to protest the violence against doctors.

==== Planned protests ====
The IMA called for a nation-wide strike on 17 June 2019. The association also stated that it will ask Union Home Minister Amit Shah and Prime Minister Narendra Modi to bring a central law to prevent violence against doctors.

=== Day 5: 15 June 2019 ===
As protests entered 15 June 2019, the doctors were protesting for the fifth straight day. The Federation of Resident Doctors' Association stated that 15 hospitals in Delhi held protests. The AIIMS Resident Doctors' Association issued a 48-hour ultimatum to the West Bengal government. Around 246 resignations were given by doctors working in various government hospitals in West Bengal.

== Aftermath ==
As of 14 June 2019, five people have been arrested in connection to the assault of the two junior doctors. The Chief Minister Mamata Banerjee stated that the bail prayers of the arrested were rejected.

The incumbent Chief Minister of West Bengal, Mamata Banerjee alleged that the protests are the result of a conspiracy between the Left Front and the Bharatiya Janata Party (BJP). She stated that she held the BJP responsible and accused BJP party leader and Union Home Minister, Amit Shah of "creating confusion and communal tension in the state". The state BJP chief, Dilip Ghosh then alleged that the Chief Minister is not taking action against the people who assaulted the doctors, because they are "her voters".

== See also ==
- Violence against healthcare professionals in India
- 2024 Kolkata rape and murder incident
