= 2017 Bangladesh flood =

The 2017 Bangladesh flood may refer to:

- 2017 Bangladesh landslides, in floods of June 2017
- 2017 South Asian floods, of August 2017

== See also ==
- Floods in Bangladesh
