= Ratna Debnath =

Indian politician and activist

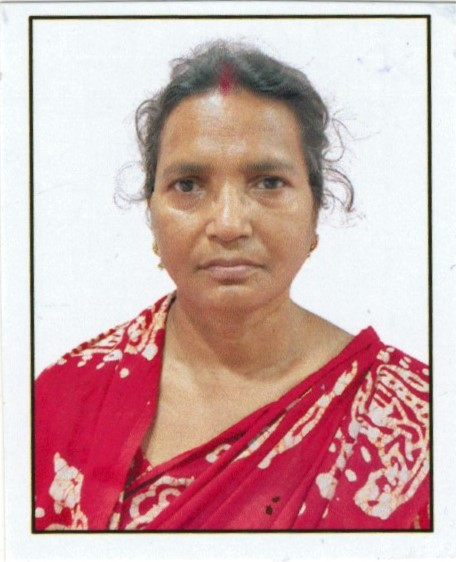
- Ratna Debnath

Member of West Bengal Legislative Assembly
- Incumbent
- Assumed office 9 May 2026
- Preceded by: Nirmal Ghosh
- Constituency: Panihati

Personal details
- Born: 1972 (age 53–54) Kolkata, West Bengal, India
- Party: Bharatiya Janata Party
- Spouse: Shekhar Ranjan Debnath
- Children: Moumita Debnath (deceased)
- Occupation: Politician; Social Activist
- Known for: RG Kar case victim's mother
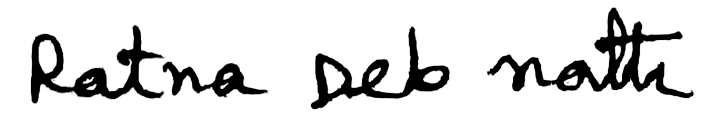
- Signature

Ratna Debnath is an Indian politician and activist from West Bengal. She is a Member of the West Bengal Legislative Assembly since 2026, representing Panihati Assembly constituency as a member of the Bharatiya Janata Party. She came to wider public attention as the mother of the victim in the 2024 Kolkata RG Kar Medical College and Hospital case, which led to public protests and debate over women's safety and justice in West Bengal.

== Political career ==
Ahead of the 2026 West Bengal Legislative Assembly election, the BJP announced Debnath as its candidate from Panihati Assembly constituency in North 24 Parganas district. During her campaign, Debnath stated that women's safety and justice were among her priorities.

She was warmly welcomed by teary eyed people wherever she went for campaigning. Her quest for justice was also supported by several politicians from the BJP. The Prime Minister Narendra Modi, former Union Minister Smriti Irani, former Chief Minister of Tripura Biplab Deb, Union Minister Dharmendra Pradhan were among the politicians who extended their support for her.

She was allegedly harassed and intimidated by some supporters of the ruling party while filing her nomination. Debnath won the 2026 West Bengal Legislative Assembly election from Panihati by a huge margin defeating Tirthankar Ghosh from AITC.

== Public profile ==
After her candidacy was confirmed, in one media interaction she publicly vowed not to comb her hair until her daughter was served justice and the then chief minister Mamata Banerjee was dethroned, similar to how Draupadi refused to comb her hair until her dishonour at the hands of Dushasana (see Mahabharata's Sabha Parva) had been avenged. Commentators described her candidacy as symbolically significant because it connected issues of justice, public safety, and electoral politics in West Bengal.

The 2024 Kolkata RG Kar Medical College and Hospital case and Debnath's decision to contest election from BJP is said to be one of the biggest reason for loss of All India Trinamool Congress and Mamata Banerjee. The election resulted in BJP scripting a historic landslide victory winning 207 seats out of 293 and All India Trinamool Congress being reduced to only 80 seats. The outgoing chief minister Mamata Banerjee lost to BJP candidate Suvendu Adhikari.

== Electoral performance ==
West Bengal Legislative Assembly
Year	Constituency	Party	Votes	%	Opponent	Party	Votes	%	Margin	Result
2026	Panihati	BJP	87,977	50.28%	Tirthankar Ghosh	AITC	59,141	33.8%	28,836	Won

== Personal life ==
Ratna Debnath is the mother of the victim in the 2024 Kolkata RG Kar Medical College and Hospital case. Her only daughter was a 31 year old resident doctor in R.G Kar MCH, when she was raped and murdered on duty. Following the incident, there was widespread protest in the state by the medical fraternity as well as by civilians, who campaigned for justice for the victim and her family.

The family expressed their dissatisfaction with the investigation and said their daughter was denied justice. In 2025, Debnath said she wanted to contest elections and enter politics to serve justice to her daughter and was subsequently given a ticket by the BJP.
