= 2024 Kolkata rape and murder =

Assault and rape incident in India

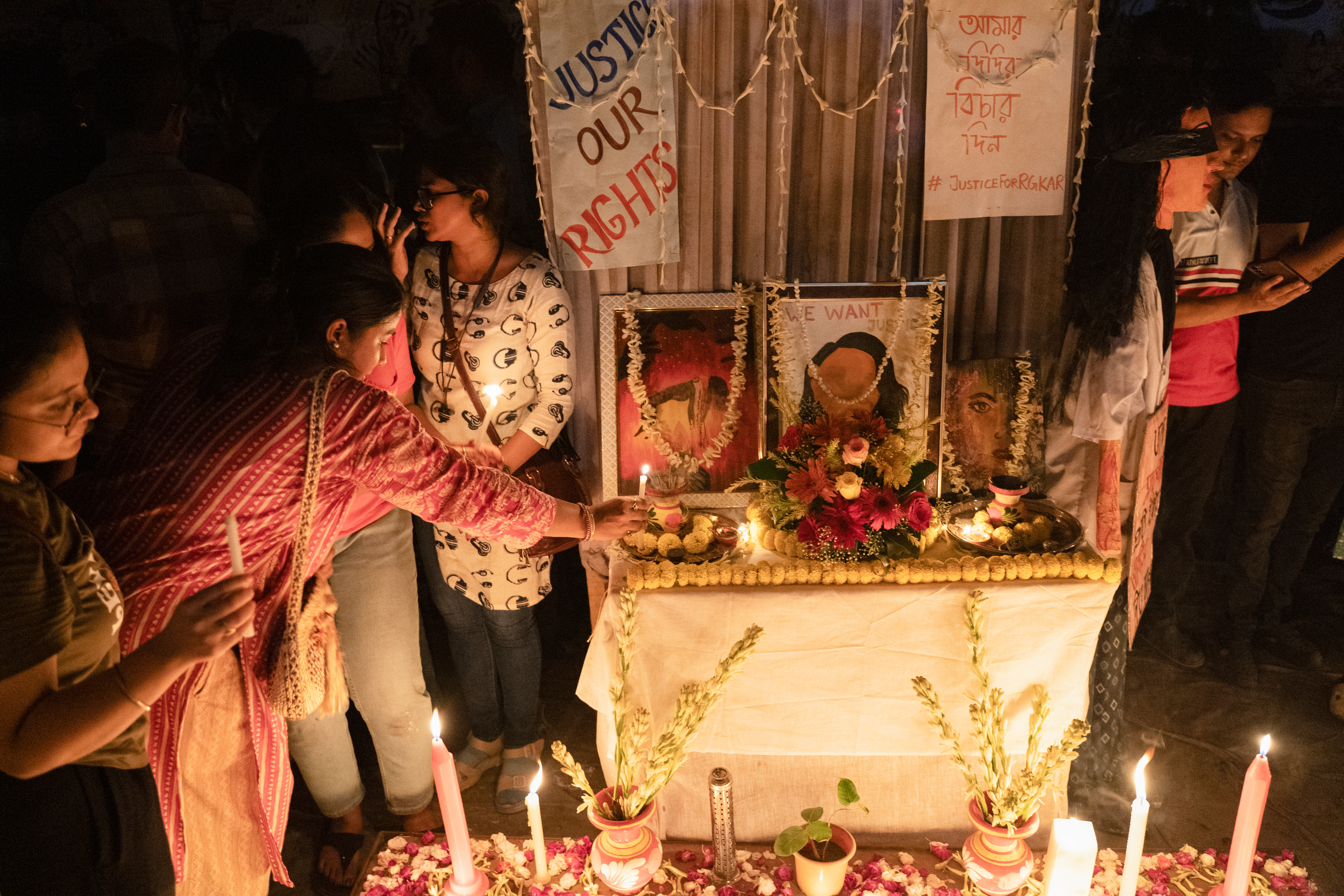
- Protestors at a makeshift memorial before a protest march in Kolkata
- Date: 9 August 2024
- Location: R. G. Kar Medical College and Hospital, Belgachia, Kolkata, West Bengal, India; 22.60399°N 88.37893°E
- Type: Rape and murder
- Outcome: Convicted and sentenced to life imprisonment
- Deaths: 1
- Arrests: 3
- Convicted: Sanjay Roy
- Charges: Rape and murder

On 9 August 2024, a 31-year-old female postgraduate resident physician at R. G. Kar Medical College and Hospital in Kolkata, West Bengal, India, was raped and murdered in a college building. Her body was found in a seminar room on campus. On 10 August 2024, a 33-year-old male civic volunteer, named Sanjay Roy working for Kolkata Police was arrested under suspicion of committing the crime. Three days later, the Calcutta High Court transferred the investigation to the Central Bureau of Investigation (CBI) stating that the Kolkata Police's investigation did not inspire confidence. The junior doctors in West Bengal undertook a strike action for 42 days demanding a thorough probe of the incident and adequate security at hospitals. The incident amplified debate about the safety of women and doctors in India, and has sparked significant outrage, and nationwide and international protests.

== Incident ==
On the night of 8 August 2024, the victim had dinner with her colleagues and retired in a seminar hall after a 36-hour shift in the hospital. At about 9:30 IST the following morning, her body was discovered in the seminar hall in a semi-nude state with her eyes, mouth, and genitals bleeding. She was later declared dead. College authorities initially informed her family that she had committed suicide.

An autopsy was conducted on 9 August and, after its completion, an unnatural death case was registered.

== Investigation ==
=== Autopsy report ===
An autopsy revealed that the victim had been raped and sexually assaulted before being killed via strangulation. The report, spanning four pages, also noted deep wounds in her genital tract, lips, left leg, right hand, ring finger, neck, and face. The report revealed that the scratch marks on the woman's face were likely caused by the culprit's fingernails. According to the report, pressure was applied to her mouth and throat, and she was strangled, resulting in a fracture of the thyroid cartilage. The report also noted bleeding from her eyes, mouth, and genitals, with the injuries in her genital area attributed to "perverted sexuality" and "genital torture". The exact cause of the injuries to her eyes remains undetermined.

It was reported that the postmortem autopsy also revealed that around "150 mg" of semen was found in the vaginal swab. This finding, along with the extent of injuries, led the doctors who assessed the autopsy report and the victim's parents to suggest the victim may have been subjected to gang rape. However, the Kolkata Police has dismissed these claims as rumours, stating that it is impossible to distinguish semen from multiple individuals with the naked eye during an autopsy. The CBI investigation has not so far revealed any signs of occurrence of a gang rape. In a clarification of the report's data, it was stated that the "151 g" (not mg) relates to the total weight of the genitalia sample collected from the body, not exclusively to semen.

=== Arrests ===
Following an investigation, the police arrested a suspect, a civic volunteer Sanjay Roy with the Kolkata Police disaster management force who had been posted at the police outpost near the medical college. An anonymous police source speaking to the Hindustan Times described Roy as a womaniser and estranged family members described him as a domestic abuser. According to the Kolkata Police, he initially confessed to the crime. A psycho-analysis test of the accused in the case was conducted by the Delhi's Central Forensic Science Laboratory (CFSL) on the request of the CBI. The officers told PTI that "he showed no remorse and was unflustered while narrating the incident". He was sent to 14-day judicial custody on 23 August.

A special CBI court had granted permission to the agency to conduct a polygraph test on the accused as well as the ex-principal of the college. The polygraph of the accused revealed several inconsistencies with regard to his narration of the events of the night of the crime. The CBI raided the house of Sandip Ghosh and former medical superintendent and college vice-principal, Sanjay Vashisth, on 25 August and seized several documents. It also filed an FIR against them over financial irregularities and corruption at the hospital. Later, the Enforcement Directorate (ED) also launched an investigation over the financial irregularities by the hospital administration.

On 14 September 2024, Sandip Ghosh, the former principal of the college, and Abhijit Mondal, the Station House Officer (SHO) of Tala Police Station, were detained.

Ghosh is accused of complicity in the delay of filing the First Information Report (FIR) and mishandling key evidence in the case. His arrest marks the second time he's been taken into custody—he had earlier been arrested for unrelated financial irregularities at the hospital. Meanwhile, Mondal has been accused of tampering with evidence and misleading the investigation team.

=== Investigation of the college principal ===
Sandip Kumar Ghosh, an orthopedic surgeon and the principal of the college, resigned amid the protests surrounding the incident. He cited an inability to endure the ongoing humiliation from social media criticism and defamatory remarks by politicians. Shortly after his resignation, he was appointed as the principal of Calcutta National Medical College, a move that sparked further outrage. On 13 August, the Calcutta High Court directed the government and the concerning authorities to place him on extended leave while also criticising his immediate re-appointment.

On 28 August, the Indian Medical Association suspended the membership of Ghosh amid allegations of corruption and the ongoing CBI and Enforcement Directorate (ED) investigations against him. He was the vice-president of the association's Kolkata branch. Ghosh had been subjected to two polygraph tests over an alleged cover-up of the rape and allegations of financial fraud and irregularities at the college and hospital. On 2 September, the CBI arrested Ghosh, along with his security aide Afsar Ali and vendors Biplav Singha and Suman Hazar, over financial irregularities and fraud during his tenure as the principal. He, along with the other arrested people, were remanded to eight-day CBI custody by a special court. On 3 September, he was suspended by the West Bengal Health Department. On 14 September, he was again arrested by the CBI along with a police officer, Abhijit Mondal, for destruction of evidence at the hospital.

== Court proceedings ==
On 13 August 2024, the Calcutta High Court, unsatisfied with the police's handling of the investigation, assigned the case to the Central Bureau of Investigation (CBI). They also flagged the possibility of destruction of evidence if the state police continued with their investigation.

On 18 August, the Supreme Court took suo moto cognizance of the case. A three-judge bench headed by the Chief Justice of India DY Chandrachud heard the matter on 20 August. They criticised the State government and Kolkata police, as well as the college administration, over mishandling of the case and the vandalism which occurred on the night of 14 August. Following the incident and protests, the court constituted a national task force to ensure workplace safety for doctors and requested the protesting doctors return to their duties. The court ordered the Central Industrial Security Force and Central Reserve Police Force to provide security at the hospital and asked the CBI to submit a status report. In the hearing on 22 August, the court heavily criticised the law enforcement for the time delay between the discovery of the body and the registration of a first information report. It asked the state government to not take any action on the protesting doctors and the civilians and to not undertake any measures to stop peaceful protestors while requesting doctors to resume normal work. At a hearing on 9 September, judges sought clarification over the precise time of death and the filing of an unnatural death case. They asked for a CBI status report by the coming week. Advocate Kapil Sibal, who appeared on behalf of the West Bengal government, informed the court that 23 people had died as a result of the protests by medical fraternity in West Bengal.

On 9 September, the Supreme Court asked all the protesting doctors to return to their respective duties by the evening of 10 September. It asked the state government to extend all possible support to the CISF team providing security at the R.G. Kar Hospital and medical college.

In line with the longstanding rape shield laws of India, in August 2024, the Supreme Court ordered that the name and photos of the victim be removed from social media and electronic platforms. On 17 September 2024, the Supreme Court specifically instructed Wikipedia to remove the name and photo of the victim.

On 16 September 2024, advocate Indira Jaising took the charge to represent the doctors from WBJDF in Supreme Court.

On 7 October 2024, CBI filed a preliminary chargesheet against Sanjay Roy, formally charging him of the rape and murder of the victim.

On 11 December 2024, the victim's main legal counsel Vrinda Grover withdrew from all the case proceedings and announced that she will no longer represent the victim, citing "intervening factors", suggesting a difference of opinion between the victim's family and the lawyer.

On 18 January 2025, Roy was convicted for the rape and murder under sections 64, 66, and 103(1) of the Bharatiya Nyaya Sanhita. He was sentenced to life imprisonment and was fined ₹50,000 (US$520) on 20 January. Roy maintained his innocence throughout the proceedings and claimed that he had been framed, beaten in prison and forced to sign papers. The judge further ordered the state to award a compensation of ₹17 lakh (US$18,000) to the family of the victim as the crime took place at her place of work. Anirban Das, the Additional District and Sessions Judge in Sealdah, noted that this was not one of the rarest of the rare cases and did not award the death penalty to Roy.

Following the conviction, the parents of the victim expressed dissatisfaction with the sentencing, stating that he deserved the death penalty, adding that the CBI did not work effectively. The victim's mother, publicly called for accountability and a transparent investigation following the incident. In 2026, she was nominated as a BJP candidate from Panihati in the 2026 West Bengal Legislative Assembly election. The doctors and nurses echoed similar sentiments, while Chief Minister Mamata Banerjee expected a death sentence. The Bharatiya Janata Party IT head Amit Malviya also criticized life imprisonment given to Roy, adding that verdict must be appealed and that the TMC Government should stop shielding the perpetrators. Malviya also added that the role of Kolkata Commissioner and Chief Minister should be investigated in the destruction of evidence at the crime scene.

On 29 January 2025, state government gave its nod for the prosecution of Sandip Ghosh by CBI on the corruption case.

On 29 March 2025, CBI submitted a report to the Calcutta High Court concluding that the incident was not an instance of gang rape. It also submitted a status report on its ongoing probe on “greater conspiracy to commit this crime and hush up the matter.”

== Protests ==
=== Medical fraternity ===
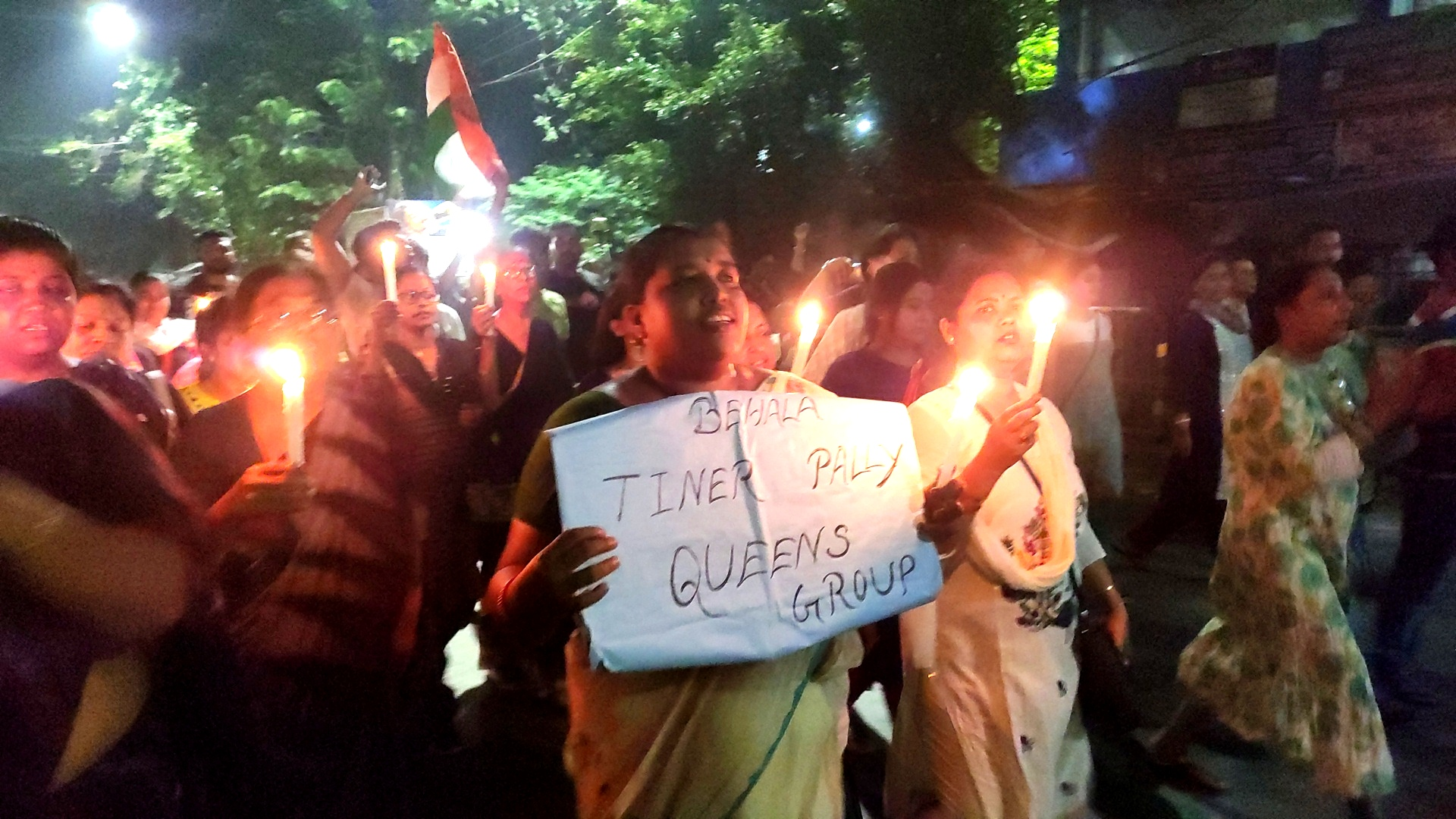
People protesting for justice for the victim in Kolkata

The incident was widely covered in the media and triggered outrage across the nation. Within the medical community, student unions and colleagues of the deceased demanded justice and improved security measures on campus.

In response, the Indian Medical Association (IMA) called on Union Health Minister J. P. Nadda to introduce a special central law aimed at preventing violence against doctors. They also urged that hospitals be designated as safe zones. This appeal followed widespread protests and strikes by resident doctors across the country in response to the crime, which raised serious concerns about the safety of medical staff.

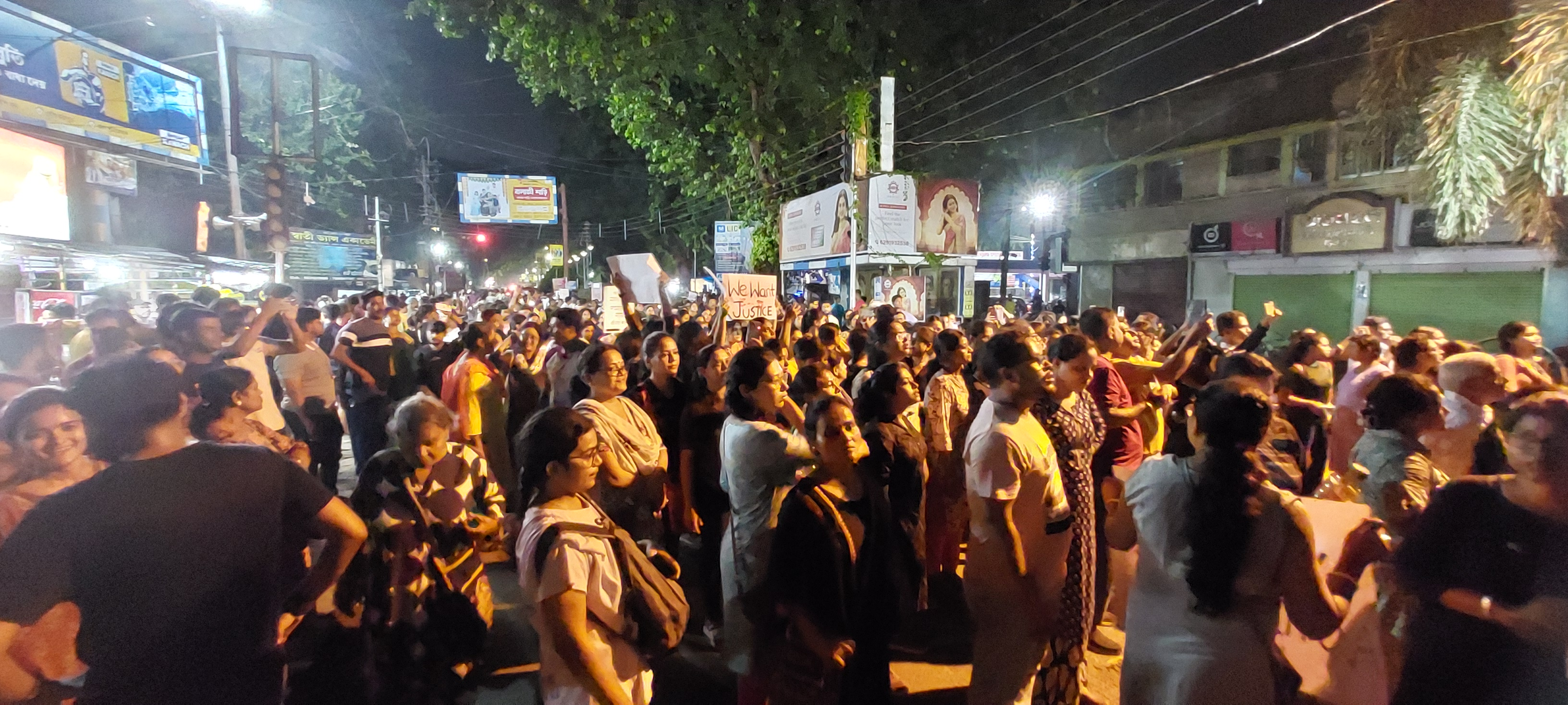
Midnight protest for justice in Kalyani

On 13 August, over 8,000 doctors in the state of Maharashtra suspended all but emergency services. In New Delhi, junior doctors wearing white coats staged a protest outside major government hospitals. Emergency services stayed suspended on 13 August in almost all the government-run college hospitals in Kolkata. Similar protests in cities such as Lucknow, and Goa affected some hospital services. Hospitals which were the sites of protests included AIIMS Delhi, Lady Hardinge Medical College, Safdarjung Hospital, RML Hospital, Calcutta National Medical College and Hospital as well as the R. G. Kar Medical College and Hospital.

On 12 August, the Federation of Resident Doctors Association (FORDA) protested by suspending all elective medical services. Some demonstrations were called off on 13 August after a delegation of the IMA and other groups had met Health Minister J. P. Nadda. However, several resident doctors associations in India, including the Federation of All India Medical Associations (FAIMA) and doctors at AIIMS Delhi, Calcutta National Medical College, Indira Gandhi Medical College Dwarka, R. G. Kar Medical College and Hospital, RML Hospital, and Safdarjung Hospital have continued protests. Two days after calling off the strike, FORDA resumed its strike following reports of police violence against protesters and the vandalism during the night of 14–15 August at R.G. Kar Medical College.

Protests called "Women, Reclaim the Night" were held in Kolkata and other cities around India on 14 August. The goal of the protest has been described as "For Women's independence on the midnight of independence", noting that the protests continued through India's Independence Day on 15 August.

On 15 August, shortly after midnight, police deployed tear gas and baton charged a crowd of demonstrators at R.G. Kar Medical College after a group toppled a barricade and entered the hospital. The individuals threw stones at the hospital premises and vandalised the emergency ward and the area where the victim was found. Several policemen and protestors were injured. Kolkata Police commissioner Vineet Goyal blamed the incident on the "malicious media campaign" against the Kolkata police. Kolkata police detained and later arrested 19 persons responsible for the violence and vandalism at the hospital premises on 15 August.

The IMA, along with many medical colleges, held a nationwide strike in all hospitals on 17 August in response to the crime as well as the vandalism at the hospital. This resulted in large scale suspension of medical services in government hospitals and various public hospitals across the country. While emergency services remained functional, OPD services and elective surgeries were cancelled.

On 18 August, East Bengal-Mohun Bagan supporters planned a protest at Salt Lake Stadium during the Kolkata Derby of the Durand Cup. But citing security concerns, the match was abandoned on the same day and planned to move elsewhere. Following the cancellation of the match, East Bengal, Mohun Bagan and Mohamedan fans came together and started protesting on the street near the stadium.

On 22 August, staff at AIIMS Delhi, RML hospital, and other public hospitals across India called off their strike following an appeal from the Supreme Court. However, the doctors in West Bengal continued their strike despite assurances from the court.

On 27 August, a rally was organized by the Paschim Banga Chhatra Samaj and the opposition Bharatiya Janata Party (BJP). The protest was called Nabanna Abhijan (March to Nabanna, the West Bengal secretariat). As with previous Nabanna Abhijan protests, there were demands for the resignation of Chief Minister Mamata Banerjee and demonstrations against her government for failing to ensure the safety and security of its citizens. The Kolkata police termed the march illegal and erected barricades around the building. Lathi charges, water cannons and tear gas were used by law enforcement to disperse the crowd after which the protestors resorted to stone pelting. Several policemen and protestors were injured during the march. The BJP announced a 12-hour statewide bandh in West Bengal on 28 August after the violence which erupted during the Nabanna Abhijan rally and the police crackdown against the protestors. The strike affected rail and road transport services mainly in Kolkata. Violence occurred throughout the day between the workers of the Trinamool Congress (TMC) and the BJP.

On 2 September, junior doctors marched towards Lalbazar from College Square demanding the resignation of the Kolkata Police Commissioner. Since barricades were put up in front of police headquarters, the doctors sat on the road.

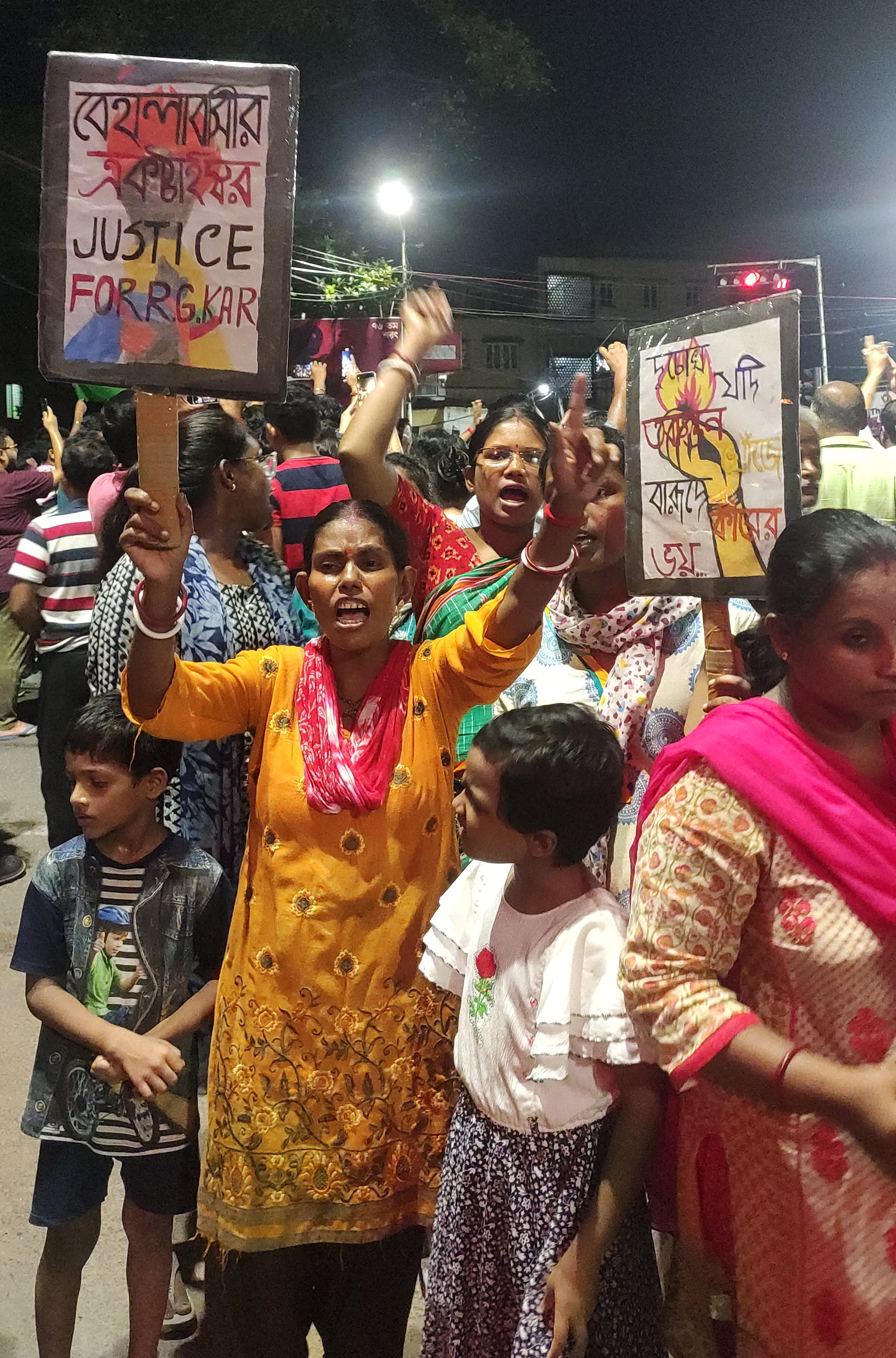
Protesters on the streets for Reclaim the Night movement in Kolkata on 4 September 2024

At midnight on 4 September, thousands of women across West Bengal marched on the road for the "Reclaim the Night" campaign, in the second such gathering since 14 August.

On 1 October, doctors belonging to the West Bengal Junior Doctors’ Front resumed their strike after they had partially lifted it due to the 2024 West Bengal floods.

=== Celebrities and politicians ===
Hrithik Roshan, Kareena Kapoor Khan, and Alia Bhatt were among celebrities who posted on their social media accounts calling for justice for the victim. Other celebrities such as Sourav Ganguly and Mohammed Siraj asked for severe punishment to the criminals. Harbhajan Singh, former cricketer and Rajya Sabha MP for the Aam Aadmi Party, wrote a letter requesting that the Chief Minister and governor of West Bengal take swift action regarding the case. On 28 August 2024, President Droupadi Murmu described the incident as horrific.

=== International ===
The incident drew international attention, resulting in protests by the Indian community in Australia, Bangladesh, Pakistan, Canada, Germany, the United Kingdom and the United States. Fresh protests were held on 8 September by the Indian diaspora in solidarity with the victim. Demonstrations were held in 130 cities in 25 countries, including the United States, Japan, Taiwan, Singapore and Australia.

A solidarity rally was also held by students of the University of Dhaka in Bangladesh on 16 August in support of the protests in Kolkata, with the slogan Awaaz Tolo Nari (Raise Your Voice, Women).

== Reaction of West Bengal government following incident ==
=== Criticism ===
The West Bengal government, led by the Trinamool Congress (TMC), has been criticised for lapses regarding the security and safety of women in the state. The Indian Medical Association and members of the opposition Bharatiya Janata Party accused the West Bengal government, under the leadership of Chief Minister Mamata Banerjee, and state police of being directly accountable for the incident, asserting that the vandalism on the night of 14 August was perpetrated by "TMC goons" in order to destroy evidence related to the case. TMC MP Mahua Moitra denied any allegations that her party and the Chief Minister were involved in any systematic cover-up, calling such claims "absolutely wrong and incorrect".

=== New laws ===
The West Bengal government introduced a new bill in the West Bengal Legislative Assembly on 3 September 2024 named the Aparajita Woman and Child Bill (West Bengal Criminal Laws and Amendment), 2024. West Bengal became the first state in India to make an amendment in central laws for crimes of a sexual nature against women and children. The bill was passed unanimously in the assembly and was sent to the Governor C. V. Ananda Bose and to President Droupadi Murmu for assent. The bill will amend the application of the recently updated Indian penal code in West Bengal. It entailed death penalty for convicts of rape and other unnatural sexual offences if it resulted in death of the victim or left the victim in a vegetative state. It also provides for a life sentence without parole for those convicted in other cases. In addition, a special task force led by a female officer will be created to help accelerate investigations into rape cases, dedicated courts will be created to fast-track these types of cases, penalties will be introduced for unreasonable delays in investigations, and a time limit of 21 days (with a possible 15 day extension) to issue a decision will be instituted.

Legal practitioners have criticsed the bill as an "attempt to exploit 'collective amnesia' and divert criticism over the recent incident." The Bill has been universally panned as regressive, unconstitutional, and anti-feminist, with the retired Supreme Court Judge Ashok Ganguly terming it "a political gimmick to divert attention from unrest."

== Negotiations ==
WBJDF, representative of protesting medical fraternity, ignored the request of the Supreme Court to cease protests by 10 September and staged a sit-in protest at the headquarters of the West Bengal health department, Swasthya Bhavan in the Salt Lake area of Kolkata after which they were invited for talks with the Chief Minister, Mamata Banerjee.

The doctors sought a delegation of 30 members to represent them which was accepted by the state government after an initial request to limit the number to 15. The delegation sought a live telecast of the negotiations which was not agreed by the government due to which the delegation did not attend the meeting with the Chief Minister. Mamata Banerjee remarked that she was ready to resign and she too, wants justice for the victim. However, the protesting medical fraternity remarked that they did not seek her resignation.

She announced that the patient welfare committees of all the government hospitals stand dissolved with immediate effect. The doctors said, after a surprise visit by her to their place of protest, they said that they were ready to talks with the government and that their demands are not unjustified. On 17 September 2024, after a successful meeting between the chief minister and the delegation of junior doctors, the Kolkata police commissioner Vineet Goyal and a deputy police commissioner were removed from their posts. He was sacked but transferred to as new Additional Director General of Police in West Bengal State Special Task Force on the same day, replacing Manoj Verma as new commissioner of Kolkata Police.

== National Task Force ==
The National Task Force (NTF) for safety of medical professionals at the workplace was set up by the Supreme Court of India in the aftermath. On 20 August 2024, a three-judge bench led by the Supreme Court Chief Justice of India D. Y. Chandrachud and including Justice J. B. Pardiwala and Justice Manoj Misra constituted a 9-member task force to work out suggestions to improve the safety of medical professionals at the workspace.

=== Establishment ===
On 18 August 2024, the Supreme Court of India took suo moto cognizance of the case. A three-judge Supreme Court bench headed by the Chief Justice of India D. Y. Chandrachud heard the matter on 20 August 2024 and constituted a National Task Force (NTF) to ensure workplace safety for medical professionals. The NTF was asked by the Supreme Court to submit its interim report within three weeks and the final report within two months.

=== Members ===
The Supreme Court of India appointed the members of the National Task Force which includes medical professionals in India and the office holders of several Indian medical organisations:

- Surgeon Vice Admiral Aarti Sarin AVSM VSM
- Dr. D. Nageshwar Reddy: Chairman of the Asian Institute of Gastroenterology and AIG Hospitals, Hyderabad
- Dr. M. Srinivas: Director of the All-India Institute of Medical Sciences (AIIMS), New Delhi
- Dr. M. V. Padma Srivastava: Chairperson of Neurology at Paras Healthcare, Gurugram
- Dr. Pratima Murthy: Director and a senior professor of psychiatry at the National Institute of Mental Health and Neurosciences (NIMHANS), Bangalore
- Dr. Goverdhan Dutt Puri: Executive Director of the All-India Institute of Medical Sciences (AIIMS), Jodhpur
- Dr. Saumitra Rawat: Chairperson of the Institute of Surgical Gastroenterology, GI and HPB Onco-Surgery, and Liver Transplantation at Sir Ganga Ram Hospital, Delhi
- Dr. Anita Saxena: Vice-Chancellor of Pandit B D Sharma Medical University, Rohtak
- Dr. Pallavi Saple: Dean, Grant Medical College and Sir J J Group of Hospitals, Mumbai

==== Ex-officio members ====
- Cabinet Secretary to the Government of India
- Union Home Secretary
- Union Health Secretary
- Chairperson, National Medical Commission (NMC)
- President, National Board of Examinations in Medical Sciences (NBEMS)

=== Activities ===
The Union Ministry of Health and Family Welfare contributed logistics and funding. After 27 August 2024, a portal was created to seek suggestions. Suggestions included improved CCTV cameras coverage, access control, and checking up on staff. State governments were requested to list existing security measures, (they run most health facilities) before meeting two NTF members about temporary solutions.

As of 27 August, 300-400 suggestions were received. The Telangana Teaching Government Doctors Association (TTGDA) highlighted infrastructure, staffing, security and administration. The Andhra Pradesh Government Doctors' Association (APGDA) sent nine recommendations including a Special Protection Force.

The NTF examines both safety and security. The Indian Medical Association lobbied for laws including declaring hospitals as safe zones.

== See also ==
- 2012 Delhi gang rape and murder
- 2019 India doctors' strike
- Aruna Shanbaug case
- Censorship of Wikipedia
- Rape in India
- Violence against healthcare professionals by country § India
