= 2017 Mumbai flood =

Natural disaster in Mumbai, India

A drive by the flooded Mumbai

The 2017 Mumbai flood occurred on 29 August 2017, following heavy rain on 29 August 2017 in Mumbai. Transport systems were unavailable throughout parts of the city as trains and roadways were shut. Power was shut off from various parts of the city to prevent electrocution. The International Federation of Red Cross and Red Crescent Societies (IFRC) called the South Asian floods one of the worst regional humanitarian crises in years. This event can be compared with the 2005 floods in Mumbai, which recorded 944 mm (37.17 inches) of rainfall within 24 hours on 26 July.

The extreme rainfall on 29 August 2017 was forecasted by the Indian Meteorological Department (IMD), five to six days in advance. However, the government failed to respond quickly, leading to the crisis. Recent research indicates that these floods could be attributed to climate change. Climate change has led to huge fluctuations in the monsoon winds carrying the moisture from the Arabian Sea, resulting in heavy rainfall over central India, lasting for two to three days.

== Timeline ==
Mumbai recorded 468 mm of rainfall in twelve hours, the highest in a day in August since 1997, according to data from the India Meteorological Department. Transport systems came to a virtual standstill with local trains in Mumbai stationary and various flights cancelled with almost all delayed. On Link Road, a building collapsed. The Maharashtra Government declared 30 August 2017 a holiday for all schools and colleges.

== Casualties ==
As of the morning of 30 August 2017, fourteen people were confirmed killed.

Flooding caused a building to collapse, killing at least 21 people. All of this raised the question that why India does suffer from such extreme flooding after all.

== See also ==
- Hurricane Harvey
- 2017 West Bengal floods
- Maharashtra floods of 2005
- 2017 Northeast India floods
- 2017 Gujarat flood
