= Panihati Assembly constituency =

Panihati
- Constituency No. 111 for the West Bengal Legislative Assembly
- Interactive Map Outlining Panihati Assembly Constituency

Constituency details
- Country: India
- Region: East India
- State: West Bengal
- District: North 24 Parganas
- Lok Sabha constituency: Dum Dum
- Established: 1967
- Total electors: 185,897
- Reservation: None

Member of Legislative Assembly
- 18th West Bengal Legislative Assembly
- Incumbent Ratna Debnath
- Party: BJP
- Alliance: NDA
- Elected year: 2026
- Preceded by: Nirmal Ghosh

Election wins by party in Panihati (1967–2026)
1. CPI(M) (8 wins) (53.3%)
2. Trinamool Congress (4 wins) (26.7%)
3. National Congress (2 wins) (13.3%)
4. BJP (1 win) (6.70%)
5. Other (0.00%)

Panihati Assembly constituency is a Legislative Assembly constituency of North 24 Parganas district in the Indian state of West Bengal.

== Overview ==
As per orders of the Delimitation Commission, No. 111 Panihati Assembly constituency is composed of the following: Ward Nos.1 to 14, 16, 17 and 22 to 34 of Panihati municipality.

Panihati Assembly constituency is part of No. 16 Dum Dum (Lok Sabha constituency).

== Members of the Legislative Assembly ==
| Year | Name | Party |
|---|---|---|
| 1967 | Gopal Krishna Bhattacharya | Communist Party of India (Marxist) |
| 1969 | Gopal Krishna Bhattacharya | Communist Party of India (Marxist) |
| 1971 | Gopal Krishna Bhattacharya | Communist Party of India (Marxist) |
| 1972 | Tapan Chatterjee | Indian National Congress |
| 1977 | Gopal Krishna Bhattacharya | Communist Party of India (Marxist) |
| 1982 | Gopal Krishna Bhattacharya | Communist Party of India (Marxist) |
| 1987 | Gopal Krishna Bhattacharya | Communist Party of India (Marxist) |
| 1991 | Tania Chakraborty | Communist Party of India (Marxist) |
| 1996 | Nirmal Ghosh | Indian National Congress |
| 2001 | Nirmal Ghosh | Trinamool Congress |
| 2006 | Gopal Krishna Bhattacharya | Communist Party of India (Marxist) |
| 2011 | Nirmal Ghosh | Trinamool Congress |
| 2016 | Nirmal Ghosh | Trinamool Congress |
| 2021 | Nirmal Ghosh | Trinamool Congress |
| 2026 | Ratna Debnath | Bharatiya Janata Party |

== Election results ==
=== 2026 ===
In the 2026 election, Ratna Debnath of Bharatiya Janata Party defeated her nearest rival Tirthankar Ghosh of All India Trinamool Congress.

2026 West Bengal Legislative Assembly election: Panihati
| Party | Candidate | Votes | % | ±% |
|---|---|---|---|---|
| BJP | Ratna Debnath | 87,977 | 50.28 | ▲15.11 |
| AITC | Tirthankar Ghosh | 59,141 | 33.8 | ▼15.81 |
| CPI(M) | Kalatan Dasgupta | 24,032 | 13.73 | |
| NOTA | None of the above | 1,045 | 0.6 | ▼0.74 |
| Majority | | 28,836 | 16.48 | ▲2.04 |
| Turnout | | 174,984 | 92.16 | ▲16.6 |
| BJP gain from AITC | | Swing | ▲15.11 | |

=== 2021 ===
2021 West Bengal Legislative Assembly election: Panihati
| Party | Candidate | Votes | % | ±% |
|---|---|---|---|---|
| AITC | Nirmal Ghosh | 86,495 | 49.61 | |
| BJP | Sanmoy Banerjee | 61,318 | 35.17 | ▲33.17 |
| INC | Tapas Majumdar | 21,169 | 12.14 | |
| NOTA | None of the above | 2,334 | 1.34 | |
| Majority | | 25,177 | 14.44 | |
| Turnout | | 174,356 | 75.56 | |
| AITC hold | | Swing | | |

=== 2011 ===
In the 2011 election, Nirmal Ghosh of Trinamool Congress defeated his nearest rival Ahibhusan Chakraborty of CPI(M).

West Bengal assembly elections, 2011: Panihati constituency
| Party | Candidate | Votes | % | ±% |
|---|---|---|---|---|
| AITC | Nirmal Ghosh | 88,334 | 58.34 | +6.38# |
| CPI(M) | Ahibhusan Chakraborty | 56,902 | 37.58 | −10.47 |
| BJP | Kishor Kumar Shaw | 3,759 | 2.48 | |
| Independent | Pranab Kumar Bhattacharya | 1,290 | | |
| BSP | Bhaskar Roy | 1,134 | | |
| Majority | | 31,432 | 20.76 | |
| Turnout | | 151,419 | 81.45 | |
| AITC gain from CPI(M) | | Swing | 16.85# | |

.# Swing calculated on Congress+Trinamool Congress vote percentages taken together in 2006.

=== 2006 ===
In the 2006 state assembly elections, Gopal Krishna Bhattacharya of CPI(M) won the Panihati assembly seat, defeating his nearest rival Nirmal Ghosh of Trinamool Congress. Contests in most years were multi cornered but only winners and runners are being mentioned. Nirmal Ghosh representing Trinamool Congress in 2001 defeated Kamal Sengupta Basu of CPI(M), and representing Congress in 1996 defeated Tania Chakraborty of CPI(M). Tania Chakraborty of CPI(M) defeated Nirmal Ghosh of Congress in 1991. Gopal Krishna Bhattacharya of CPI(M) defeated Tapan Chattopadhyay of Congress in 1987 and 1982, and Sanmatha Nath Ghosh of Janata Party in 1977.

=== 1972 ===
Tapan Chatterjee of Congress won in 1972. Gopal Krishna Bhattacharjee of CPI(M) won in 1971, 1969 and 1967. Prior to that the Panihati seat was not there.
