= Bongaon High School =

Indian public school

Location
- Bongaon court road, Bongaon, West Bengal, India
- Coordinates: 23°02′44.12″N 88°49′32.16″E

Information
- Type: Higher Secondary
- Established: 1886
- Headmaster: Kunal Dey
- Teaching staff: 60
- Gender: Boys'
- Enrollment: 2500+
- Colors: Blue, white

Bongaon High School is a state funded higher secondary boys' school in Bongaon, North 24 Paraganas in the Indian state of West Bengal. It was established in 1864 and served as a birthplace of Dinabandhu Mahavidyalay.

The school is affiliated to West Bengal Board of Secondary Education for secondary education and West Bengal Council of Higher Secondary Education for higher secondary education.

== Alumni ==
- Bibhutibhushan Bandyopadhyay, famous author
- Sandip Kumar Ghosh, former principal of R.G. Kar Medical college.
