= 2021 Nabanna Abhijan =

Indian Protest Rally

- Date: 11 February 2021
- Location: Main places of clashes: Esplanade; Howrah; North Kolkata; Moulali; Nabanna
- Caused by: Protests against unemployment, lack of education and other alleged failures of TMC-led Government of West Bengal
- Methods: Protest march

Parties
Government of West Bengal; West Bengal Police; Kolkata Police	Students Federation of India; Democratic Youth Federation of India; Left Front; Other Left parties and student organisations

Number
~4000	60000+ protestors

Casualties and losses
Injuries: 25 (as per Police)	Arrests: 42; Injuries: 38 (as per Police); 150+ (according to a press report); 400-500 (as per SFI); Deaths: 1 (Disputed: death caused by lathi charge according to the protestors and natural cause of death according to post mortem report)

2021 Nabanna Abhijan (transl. March to Nabanna) was a protest march to the West Bengal state secretariat Nabanna, organised by Students Federation of India (SFI), Democratic Youth Federation of India (DYFI), Left Front and other Left parties and student organisations on 11 February 2021 against the alleged failures of TMC-led Government of West Bengal, which eventually turned into a conflict between the police and protesters. The protest march saw a massive involvement of youths, students and activists from SFI, DYFI and 8 other Left parties along with Indian National Congress and it's unions. Unemployment was one of major issues of this protest.

Students and youths gathered at many places in Kolkata like Sealdah, College Street, Esplanade etc. to start the march. In Hooghly district, the march began from Singur. In Howrah district, the march started from Howrah station though in many places they were blocked by the police.

== Issues ==
The main issues mainly revolved around unemployment, i.e. job crisis and industrialization. DYFI claimed that its activists will reach Nabanna to submit thousands of applications signed by unemployed youths from West Bengal. They demanded for non-discriminatory access to education, secure jobs, good health, and all that the Constitution aspires to achieve. SFI national secretary Mayukh Biswas alleged that getting jobs through the Public Service Commission, College Service Commission and the likes have almost stopped. He further alleged that there has been a de-industrialisation drive, resulting in a severe crisis in job opportunities.

== Clashes and conflicts ==
Earlier in the day, a few Left supporters suddenly gathered outside Nabanna and started raising slogans and posters. They were arrested by the police.

The Police had set up at least 25 police pickets along the route of the rally with 4,000 personnel on duty. The police had barricaded six entry points to Howrah, including Howrah Rail Museum, Banstala Ghat, Fersore Road, Mullik Fatak, Betor Mor, and Lakshminarayan Tala. Security has been tightened in Howrah and police have erected barricades at Howrah Maidan area, about 4 km away from state secretariat Nabanna to stop the protesters. There was constant drone surveillance at these points, along with stationed water cannons. The police had allowed the protestors to march only until Dufferin Road, which is approximately six kilometers short of Nabanna.

One of the major conflict-point was Esplanade, where protestors continued to occupy several areas in despite the police using force to disperse them. The main clash happened at Esplanade's Dorina crossing, where the protestors are blocked by the two-tier barricade. The protesters tried to break barricades and push forward. Water cannons had been set up at two points at the crossing. The police fired water cannons and tear gas shells to them. When protesters tried to counter with pelting stones, the police did the same. As tension grew more, the police lathicharged protesters.

The protesters held blockades in various areas of central Kolkata. Other scuffles between the police and agitators took place at Moulali, Howrah, North Kolkata etc. The protestors were also reportedly trying to make their way inside Nabanna in Howrah when the police stopped them. According to reports, all DYFI members were arrested from the spot, and some others were detained.

== Casualties and aftermath ==
There are conflicting claims on how many students and workers were injured (38 according to police sources, more than 150 according to another report and more than 400 as per SFI state secretary Srijan Bhattacharya) which included broken skulls, bleeding noses and laceration wounds. One report suggested that an activist named Maidul Islam Midya was hit so hard in the abdomen area with a force that led to the bursting of his kidney. There were also reports of alleged custodial torture of another activist. One of the protesters' eye was injured and many others were gravely wounded. Police sources said 25 policemen got injured in the clash.

Maidul Islam Midya, one of the DYFI activists and a resident of Kotalpur in Bankura district who was injured during the rally, died on February 15 after surviving for four days in a private hospital of South Kolkata's Camac Street. According to CPI(M) leader Dr. Fuad Halim, the 32-year-old Midya's multiple muscles were badly damaged due to the brutal beating of Police and those muscle injuries caused rhabdomyolysis leading to a kidney failure, and his lungs were also affected. He suffered a massive cardiac arrest and died in morning. The police department raised several questions regarding the death, pointing out that they had no idea where Maidul was for three days after being injured. Chief Minister Mamata Banerjee claimed that Maidul's family and the police had not been informed about his admission to the hospital. She ordered a probe into his death and offered a job and financial support to his family.

Maidul's death led to fresh outbreak of violence in parts of Bengal, with the activists of DYFI and SFI again clashing with the Kolkata Police officials, demanding action against the officers who were involved in the lathi-charge. DYFI cadres assaulted a cop of Kolkata Police. Police lodged FIR against unidentified Left activists on the basis of a complaint by the aggrieved cop. Left and Congress also blocked rail tracks at 56 places of the state including Amta, Howrah, Burdwan and other parts of the state, between noon and 4 pm. At some places, police forced protesters to lift the blockade after 4 pm.

They decided to take out a procession for Maidul's death in the city, though permission of the procession was allegedly denied by the Kolkata Police. They had also called for a 12-hour bandh across the state on February 12. Notably the Bengal government issued a notification on February 11 evening, cancelling all types of leave for government employees and those in state-aided institutions to condemn the strike called by the Lefts. Because of the bandh, schools faced problem in functioning on the day of reopening after a long shutdown caused by the Covid situation. In Siliguri, a headmistress expelled the protesters from her school after they entered there raising slogans. The Left cadres created troubles in some places by attacking vehicles, threatening auto and bus drivers which caused the retailers to shut down their stores. The strikers blocked rail tracks, severely beat a bike rider and also got into scuffle with the police. However, with the exception of some scattered unrest, the picture of the entire state on that day was like any other day as the call for strike did not receive good response.

A DYFI member named Dipak Kumar Panja had gone missing from the day of the march. His family lodged a complaint to the Police. Afterwards he was found.

Meanwhile, the initial post-mortem report of the deceased Maidul found no major internal or external injury on his body. The report mentioned 'an enlarged heart, water in the pleura and that Midya's kidneys were damaged'. "Our probe is on and we are finding out what transpired till Midya was picked up in an ambulance 600 m from the clash spot," said a detective department officer. Maidul's body was brought to the DYFI office and there he was paid last respects. The final post-mortem report revealed that he died of illness.

== Reception ==
Human rights activist and the vice-president of Association for Protection of Democratic Rights (APDR), which is the state's largest human rights organisation, Ranjit Sur criticised the role of the police, "I strongly condemn the police brutality on Leftist student and youth activists." In a statement, CPI(ML)(Liberation) West Bengal state committee criticised the police action, saying it was “most unwelcome at a time when the Narendra Modi-led Union government is trying to oppress all kinds of the democratic activity." Describing Maidul's death as "extremely unfortunate", TMC spokesperson Kunal Ghosh said that there were still certain things to consider. "First, it was seen that the police were being attacked with stones, and suddenly roads were being blocked by the protesters. In this situation, it is the job of the police to clear the roads. In that tussle he (Maidul) may have gotten injured. There is no scope of labelling it a political attack. The second point is that it has to be seen which nursing home he was treated in, what kind of treatment he underwent and whether he had any prior illnesses," he said. The Trinamool leadership, while acknowledging that the death was unfortunate, said further investigation was needed before blaming the police. Condemning the violence, perpetrated by Left activists, that followed Maidul's death, State Education Minister Partha Chatterjee said "Simply because they have no support of the masses and the youth are not with them they have embarked on this path of violence. It is not acceptable."
