= Sandip Ghosh =

Indian doctor and former principal

Sandip Kumar Ghosh
- Born: Noton; Bangaon, North 24 Parganas district, West Bengal, India
- Other name: Alu
- Education: Bongaon High School; R. G. Kar Medical College and Hospital; Postgraduate Institute of Medical Education and Research
- Occupations: Doctor, former principal of R. G. Kar Medical College and Hospital
- Known for: R. G. Kar Hospital rape and murder case
- Criminal charges: 1. Financial irregularities and fraud 2. Destruction of evidence in Kolkata rape-murder case

Sandip Kumar Ghosh is an Indian doctor and former principal of R. G. Kar Medical College and Hospital.

== Early life ==
Ghosh is from Bangaon, North 24 Parganas, in the Indian state of West Bengal. He passed the Madhyamik examination in 1987 at Asansol Ramakrishna Mission High School and completed his higher secondary education at Bongaon High School in 1989. Subsequently, he enrolled in R. G. Kar Medical College and earned his MBBS degree in 1994. Ghosh worked as an orthopaedics professor and surgeon at Calcutta National Medical College, and later became the vice-principal of the college. In 2021, he was appointed as the principal of R. G. Kar Medical College and Hospital. He is also associated with the present ruling party of West Bengal, All India Trinamool Congress.

== Controversies ==
Ghosh's tenure as the principal of R. G. Kar Medical College and Hospital was marked by controversy, highlighting a number of professional irregularities. In June 2023, repeated allegations of corruption were raised against Ghosh. He was transferred to Murshidabad Medical College in Berhampore due to serious accusations of manipulation of tenders, misconduct, ethical violations, and financial mishaps. Ghosh was reinstated as the principal of R. G. Kar Medical College. Complaints were filed against him to the West Bengal State Vigilance Commission, on grounds of nepotism, demanding bribes and awarding out-of-turn contracts. In early 2021, The Comptroller and Auditor General (CAG) had identified financial irregularities during his tenure at R. G. Kar Medical College.

Following the 2024 Kolkata rape and murder incident, the rape and murder of a postgraduate trainee doctor inside the hospital premises impacted a significant agitation against Ghosh. He was transferred to Calcutta National Medical College as principal but could not join due to large-scale mass protests. Ghosh resigned from the post on 12 August. On 13 August, the Calcutta High Court intervened and directed Ghosh to take immediate leave. Starting on 25 August, the Central Bureau of Investigation and the Enforcement Directorate conducted raids and searches at multiple locations related to Ghosh and his family. On 28 August, the Indian Medical Association suspended his membership. Ghosh was given two polygraph tests over an alleged cover-up of the rape and allegations of financial fraud and irregularities at the college and hospital. On 2 September, the Central Bureau of Investigation arrested him along with three others over financial irregularities and fraud during his tenure as the principal. Subsequently, the West Bengal Health Department suspended Ghosh on 3 September. On September 15, 2024, he was charged again by the CBI along with the station house officer(SHO) of the Tala Police Station Abhijit Mondal for destruction of evidence in the 2024 Kolkata rape and murder incident. Mondal was accused of delaying in filing the FIR. His registration to practice was temporarily cancelled on 19 September 2024 by West Bengal Medical Council due to his failure to respond to an order to show cause issued by the Council about his alleged misconduct and bringing the profession to disrepute. On 13 December 2024, he was granted bail by the Sealdah Court in Kolkata along with Mondal for destruction of evidence in the 2024 Kolkata rape and murder incident as the CBI failed to file a chargesheet against Ghosh and Mondal within 90 days. Mondal was granted bail, however, Ghosh ended up serving time because of financial irregularities during his tenure as the principal. He moved the Calcutta High Court for postponing the framing of the charges against him in the financial irregularities case. The Calcutta High Court judge gave him one week of time to go through the documents for filing a discharge petition. The 4 accused in the financial irregularities case have filed exemption petitions before the special court. A special CBI court framed charges against Ghosh and 5 others in the financial irregularities case.
