= 2017 Bangladesh landslides =

2017 natural disaster in Bangladesh

2017 Bangladesh landslides/Deep Depression BOB 03
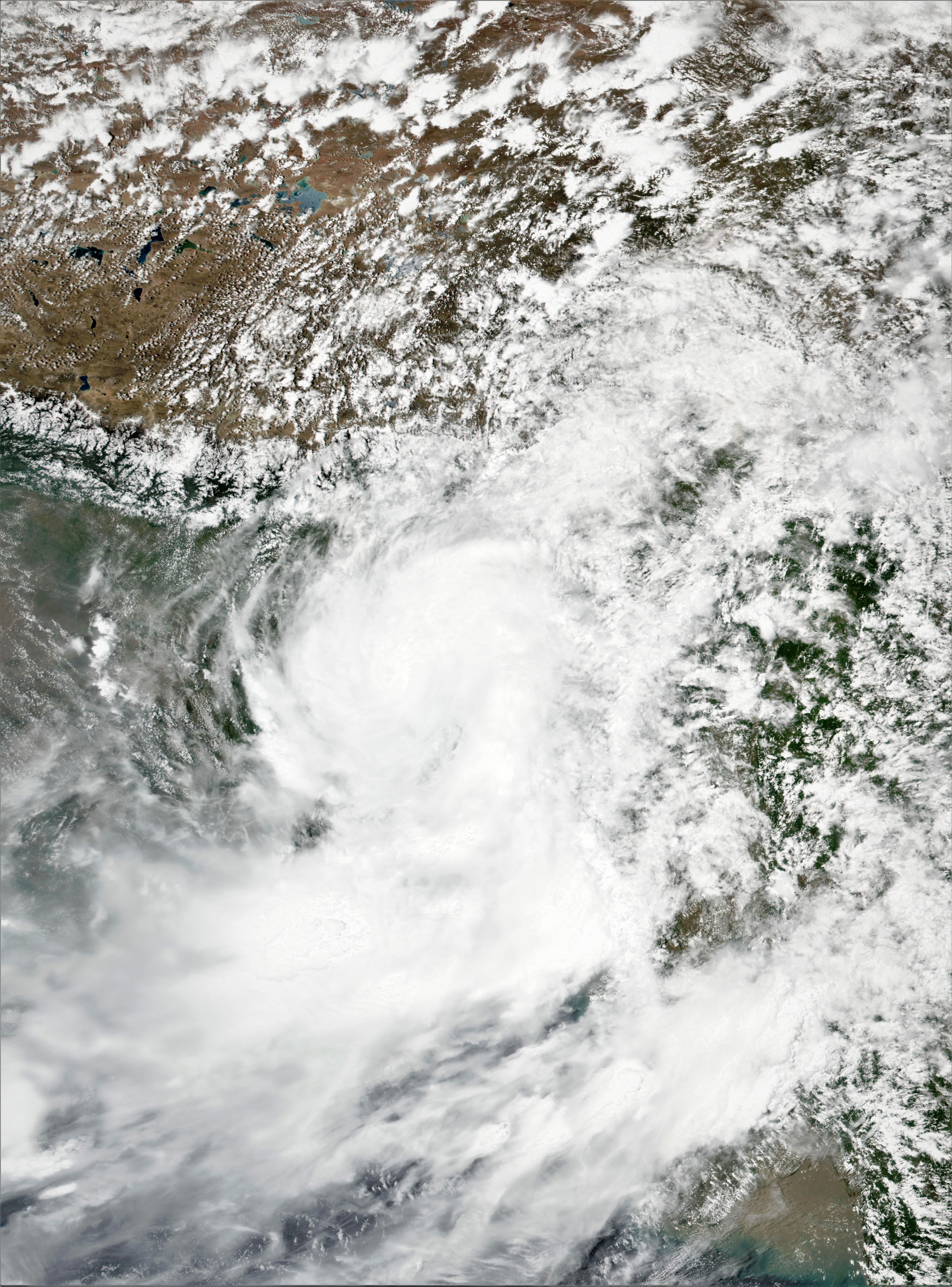
- The depression over Bay of Bengal which caused the disaster

Meteorological history
- Formed: June 11, 2017
- Dissipated: June 13, 2017

Deep depression
- 3-minute sustained (IMD)
- Highest winds: 55 km/h (35 mph)
- Lowest pressure: 988 hPa (mbar); 29.18 inHg

Overall effects
- Fatalities: 170 total
- Damage: $248 million (2017 USD)
- Areas affected: Bangladesh (Rangamati, Chittagong and Bandarban), Northeast India
- Part of the 2017 North Indian Ocean cyclone season

On 12 June 2017, heavy monsoon rain triggered a series of landslides and floods in Rangamati, Chittagong and Bandarban - three hilly districts of Bangladesh - and killed at least 152 people. The weather also caused power cuts and telecommunications disruptions, making it difficult for rescuers to reach affected communities. Reaz Ahmed, head of Bangladesh's Disaster Management Department, said the landslides were the worst in the country's history.

== Meteorological history ==
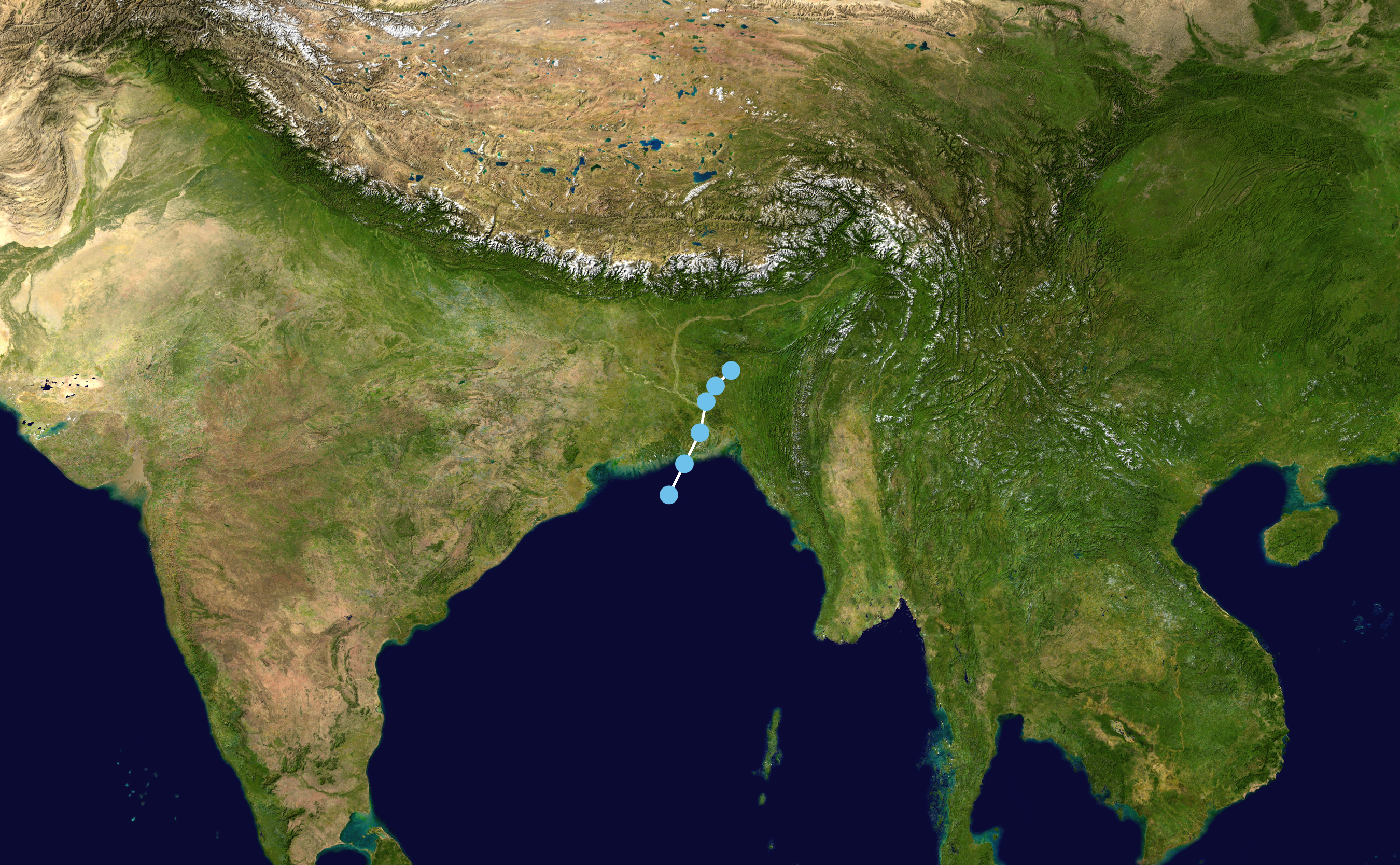
Map plotting the storm's track and intensity, according to the Saffir–Simpson scale Map key Saffir–Simpson scale Tropical depression (≤38 mph, ≤62 km/h) Tropical storm (39–73 mph, 63–118 km/h) Category 1 (74–95 mph, 119–153 km/h) Category 2 (96–110 mph, 154–177 km/h) Category 3 (111–129 mph, 178–208 km/h) Category 4 (130–156 mph, 209–251 km/h) Category 5 (≥157 mph, ≥252 km/h) Unknown Storm type Tropical cyclone Subtropical cyclone Extratropical cyclone, remnant low, tropical disturbance, or monsoon depression

A low-pressure area formed over west central & adjoining north Bay of Bengal off north Andhra Pradesh south Odisha coast in the morning of June 10. It concentrated into a well marked low-pressure area over northern parts of central Bay of Bengal and adjoining north Bay of Bay on 11th morning and into a depression over north Bay of Bengal in the evening of June 11. An anti-cyclonic circulation lay to the southeast of the system centre, leading to poleward outflow favouring genesis of the system. Moving nearly north-northeastwards, it intensified into a deep depression over north Bay of Bengal in the night of 11th (1800 UTC)and peaked with estimated 3-minute sustained windspeeds of 55 km/h (35 mph). Moving north-northeastwards, it crossed Bangladesh coast near Khepupara between 2300 UTC of 11th and 0000 UTC of June 12. As the system moved over land, it weakened gradually into a depression over east Bangladesh and neighbourhood due to land surface interaction and thereafter into a well marked low-pressure area.

== Cause ==
The landslide was caused by an incessant downpour that began early morning of 12 June, dropping 34.3 centimetres (13.5 inches) of rain in 24 hours. The monsoon and depression over Bay of Bengal towards Bangladesh resulted in heavy rain over different parts, including Dhaka and Chittagong. A study, performed after the events, indicated that the large portion of the area was already highly susceptible to landslide due to the existing factors such as steep slope, deforestation, hill cutting etc. and the intense rainfall acted as a triggering factor. The seasonal monsoon often causes floods and mudslides in the southern hills of Bangladesh. Deforestation in the area also contributed to the devastation, as well as rapid urbanisation. Indigenous leader Bijoy Giri Chakma told Channel NewsAsia that tree felling had completely denuded some hill slides, adding that he had never seen worse landslides.

A second factor was lack of land forcing poor people to live in marginal areas where rents are low. Bandarban government administrator Dilip Kumar Banik told the Associated Press that many people had built homes on slopes despite official warnings. In Cox's Bazar, officials said that 300,000 people in the area live on landslide-prone hills. The district administrators have ordered officials to create a list of homes at risk, and are discussing plans to relocate them, executive magistrate Saiful Islam told Bdnews24.com.

== Impact ==
As of 15 June 2017, officials were reporting a death toll as high as 152 in both Bangladesh and neighbouring India, with hundreds injured and many missing. Officials expected the toll to rise. Total damage of the landslide was estimated at 20 billion taka (US$248 million).

Shah Kamal, secretary of the Ministry of Disaster Management, said it could take days to reach affected areas. "The devastation is huge", he told the Associated Press. In some areas, there was as much as 1.2 metres (four feet) of mud.

The worst-hit district was Rangamati, where landslides buried hillside houses where people were sleeping. At least 20 separate landslides hit the district. Up to 105 deaths were reported as of 15 June, and 5,000 homes were damaged. Roads in Rangamati remained inaccessible on 15 June. Many roads in the district were washed away, leaving craters up to 15 metres (49 feet) deep, or heaped with debris. The district's power grid was also destroyed. There were also fuel and food shortages as of 15 June, and Belayet Hossain Mia Belal, president of the district chamber of commerce and industry, told The Daily Star that the food shortage could become dire in two to four days.

Twenty-nine people were reported dead in Chittagong and six in Bandarban. Roads in Bandarban were cleared by 15 June, when 2,000 people were able to return to their villages to see the devastation.

Two people were killed in Cox's Bazar, the town hosting thousands of Rohingya Muslim refugees.

Houses in Khagrachari district were flooded nearly to the rooftops.

Two officers and two soldiers of the Bangladesh Army (Major Mohammad Mahfuzul Haq, Captain Md Tanvir Salam Shanto, Corporal Mohammad Azizul Haq and soldier Md Shahin Alam) were killed after a second landslide struck a highway-clearing operation in Rangamati. The body of a fifth army personnel, soldier Md Azizur Rahman, was found 15 June.

At least 11 people were killed in flooding in the Indian states of Mizoram and Assam, caused by the same storms.

== Response ==
The Bangladesh government attempted to warn people ahead of the storm, using loudspeakers, but were not able to reach all areas. More than 10,000 people did get evacuated to emergency shelters.

In the two days immediately after the landslides, rescue workers were having trouble reaching victims as roads were choked with mud and rain continued. Heavy digging equipment could not reach remote areas. As of 14 June, power and cell service were still off in the affected areas. Doctors worked by candlelight to help the injured.

Thousands of Bangladesh army soldiers were already stationed in the area because of a long-standing insurgency; and they were directed to help in the rescue effort. The Bangladesh navy also helped reach people cut off by flooding.

Reaz Ahmed, head of Bangladesh's Disaster Management Department, said the landslides were the worst in the country's history. Bangladesh President Abdul Hamid and Prime Minister Sheikh Hasina made statements of shock and sympathy, praying for the affected and urging swift rescue action. Radical Bangladesh pressure group Hefazat also issued a press release urging members to help victims and offering prayers and sympathy. The government of Bangladesh also offered cash and building materials to affected families. Local authorities offered temporary food and shelter.

Abroad, Indian Prime Minister Narendra Modi tweeted condolences, prayers, and an offer of help with the rescue effort. The governments of Canada, the European Union, the United Kingdom, Pakistan, the United States, Iran, Nepal, and Russia also sent condolences.

== See also ==
- Weather of 2017
- Tropical cyclones in 2017
- 2017 North Indian Ocean cyclone season
- 2007 Chittagong mudslides
- 2017 West Bengal floods
- Cyclone Mora
- Cyclone Roanu
