= West Bengal Junior Doctors' Front =

Indian professional association

- ওয়েস্ট বেঙ্গল জুনিয়র ডক্টরস ফ্রন্ট
- Formation: 2024; 2 years ago
- Founded at: West Bengal, India
- Type: Professional organization
- Purpose: Advocacy, healthcare reform, protection of doctors' rights
- Headquarters: Kolkata, West Bengal, India
- Region served: West Bengal, India
- Website: https://www.wbjdf.com/

The West Bengal Junior Doctors' Front (WBJDF) is a representative body of junior doctors working in government medical institutions across West Bengal. It gained prominence through its involvement in advocating for better working conditions, medical infrastructure, and the safety of healthcare workers.

== Overview ==
The WBJDF was formed to address the concerns of junior doctors, including inadequate infrastructure, patient care issues, and security in state-run hospitals. It formed during the protest for justice over 2024 Kolkata rape and murder incident. It is trying to ensure accountability from the government and health authorities, along with providing a platform for junior doctors to voice their grievances.

== Abhaya Clinic ==
The Abhaya Clinic initiative was launched by WBJDF, which includes both telemedicine services and temporary medical camps, was created to continue serving patients during the doctors' ongoing strike, which seeks justice for their colleague.

Through these clinics, doctors provide free medical consultations and medications to underserved communities across Kolkata and other parts of West Bengal. Notably, the clinic also want to extended its services to treat flood victims, offering essential medical aid to those affected by the disaster. Since its inception, thousands of patients have benefited from these efforts, ensuring uninterrupted healthcare during both the strike and the emergency. These camps have been held in multiple locations, including Kumartuli, Esplanade, and near prominent medical colleges, and are staffed by doctors from various disciplines, offering their services every Sunday.

The name "Abhaya," meaning "fearlessness," symbolizes the doctors' determination to fight for justice while ensuring that patients are not left without care.
