= 2024 West Bengal floods =

Natural disaster in West Bengal, India

- Date: 17 September 2024
- Location: Howrah, Hooghly, Paschim Medinipur, Purba Medinipur, Bankura, Purulia
- Deaths: 3
- Property damage: Extensive crop damage, infrastructure loss, submerged homes

The 2024 West Bengal floods occurred in mid-September 2024, primarily affecting the southern regions of the state. The floods were triggered by a combination of heavy rainfall due to a deep depression over the Bay of Bengal and the release of water from dams managed by the Damodar Valley Corporation (DVC). The event led to widespread damage, displacement, and loss of life across several districts of West Bengal.

== Cause ==
On 13 September 2024, a well-marked low-pressure area formed over the northeast Bay of Bengal and southeast Bangladesh. By the morning of 14 September, it intensified into a depression and moved west-northwestward across coastal Bangladesh and Gangetic West Bengal. By 05:30 hours on the same day, the system strengthened into a deep depression over Bangladesh and Gangetic West Bengal. The system brought continuous heavy rainfall to southern West Bengal. The situation was worsened by the release of over 250,000 cusecs of water from DVC dams, which caused rivers to overflow.

== Affected Areas ==
The flood impacted six districts: Howrah, Hooghly, Paschim Medinipur, Purba Medinipur, Bankura, Purulia. The worst-affected areas were Ghatal in Paschim Medinipur and Udaynarayanpur in Howrah, where rising water levels and breaches in riverbanks caused massive flooding. The Dwarakeswar River breached its banks, particularly affecting Hooghly.

== Impact ==
The floods claimed the lives of three people and displaced over 2.5 lakh residents, forcing many to evacuate their homes in search of safety. The inundation severely impacted infrastructure, with roads and transportation routes submerged, making areas like Panskura railway station in Purba Medinipur completely inaccessible. Additionally, the floods devastated agriculture, as vast stretches of crops, particularly in floodplain regions, were washed away, dealing a significant blow to farmers and local economies.

== Relief and Rescue Operations ==
The West Bengal government, alongside the National Disaster Response Force (NDRF) and the State Disaster Response Force (WB), mobilized efforts to rescue and provide relief to those affected. Over 180 relief camps were set up, housing around 8,000 displaced individuals.

Also from the WBJDF, pausing their ongoing protest, a team of 26 junior doctors from RG Kar Medical College and Hospital and Bankura Sammilani Medical College and others distributed essential supplies like drinking water, food, and medicines in severely affected areas such as Panskura. They also set up medical camps to provide healthcare to flood victims.
