= Nirmal Ghosh =

Indian politician

Nirmal Ghosh (Nantoo) (born 1 August 1949) is an Indian politician from West Bengal. He was a member of the West Bengal Legislative Assembly from Panihati Assembly constituency in North 24 Parganas district. He won the 2021 West Bengal Legislative Assembly election representing the All India Trinamool Congress party. He was arrested on 13 August 2026 for hurried cremation of RG KAR murder victim on 2024.

== Early life and education ==
Ghosh is from Panihati, North 24 Parganas district, West Bengal. He is the son of late Nibaran Chandra Ghosh. He completed his BSc in 1975 at Bangabasi College, which is affiliated with Calcutta University. He is a business consultant.

== Career ==
Ghosh won from Panihati Assembly constituency representing the All India Trinamool Congress in the 2021 West Bengal Legislative Assembly election. He polled 86,495 votes and defeated his nearest rival, Sanmoy Bandyopadhyay of the Bharatiya Janata Party, by a margin of 25,177 votes. He first became an MLA winning the 1996 West Bengal Legislative Assembly election on Indian National Congress ticket. He later shifted to Trinamool Congress and retained the Panihati seat in the 2001 West Bengal Legislative Assembly election. He lost the next election in 2006, to Gopal Krishna Bhattacharya of the Communist Party of India (Marxist) but regained the seat for Trinamool Congress in 2011 defeating Ahibhusan Chakraborty, also of CPM. He won for the fourth time in 2016 Assembly election. He became an MLA for the fifth term winning the 2021 election from the same seat Trinamool Congress.
