= 2017 West Bengal floods =

Natural disaster in north-eastern India

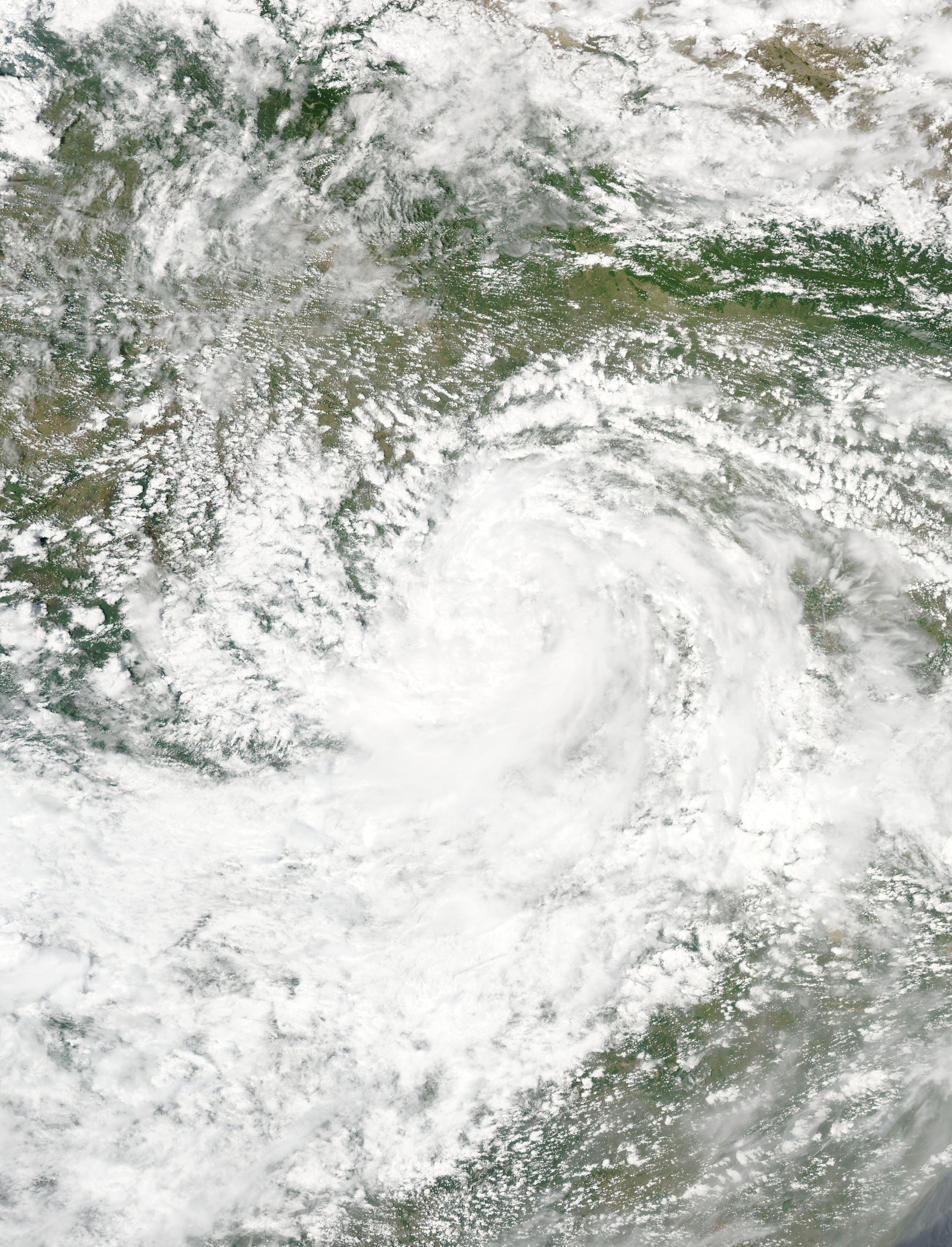
- The depression which in its precursor low caused dangerous floods in West Bengal.
- Date: July – August 2017
- Location: West Bengal and Jharkhand, India
- Deaths: At least 152 (1 June 2017 – 30 August 2017 )
- Property damage: ₹14,000 crore (US$2.18 billion)(government estimate)

Following heavy rain in July and August 2017, the Indian state of West Bengal was affected by severe flooding. The floods were reported to have caused 50 deaths since 1 August and 8 deaths in the neighbouring state of Jharkhand.

Soon after these floods, North Bengal also witnessed floods that wreaked havoc over the seven districts and killed 3 people.

== Cause and extent of the disaster ==
=== Gangetic West Bengal ===
Heavy rain in last week of July & August resulted in flood in the state. The Land Depression 01 in its precursor low & poor maintenance of dams caused dangerous floods in West Bengal.

State irrigation minister said that in some districts of south Bengal, there had been around 400 mm rainfall during the last three days. The rivers Silabati in West Midnapore, Dwarkeswar in Bankura, Dwaraka and Kuye in Birbhum were flowing above the danger level. Some villages at Suri block II got flooded due to incessant rain. Some parts of the Hooghly and West Midnapore, including Ghatal, Khirpai, Chandrakona went under water since Saturday night. Bankura recorded the state's highest rainfall at 274 mm during the same period, while Digha recorded 104 mm, Halisahar recorded 189 mm and Burdwan received 72.6 mm of rains. The water discharge from DVC dams was in excess of that in 1978 which saw an unprecedented flood in the state. So far 2.78 lakh (278 thousand) cusecs of water had been discharged by DVC as of 1 August. The situation in Bengal got worse on Thursday after Damodar Valley Corporation (DVC) released more water from its dams and sounded a red alert in the lower catchment areas of the Damodar river.

An additional 249,450 cusecs of water was released from Durgapur barrage on Thursday morning. As a result, more areas in east Burdwan, Hooghly and Howrah were hit by flood. The flood affected districts had received record rainfall from 20 to 25 July. Compared to the normal rainfall received in July, Bankura received 754 per cent, Burdwan 334 per cent, Birbhum 313 per cent, East Midnapore 500 per cent, West Midnapore 424 per cent, Howrah 427 per cent, Hooghly 359 per cent, Kolkata 367 per cent, Murshidabad 174 per cent, and Purulia 721 per cent more rainfall. The cumulative rainfall received in Birbhum from 20 to 26 July was over 600 mm.

From the weather system, the capital city of Kolkata received 142 mm of rain in 48 hours. July 2017 was the second wettest in Kolkata since 2008 with rain count 72% above the normal mark – the city received 621.5 mm rain. Only once – in 2015 – in the last decade has Kolkata received more rain in July from Cyclone Komen.

=== West Bengal ===
These floods in Gangetic West Bengal were soon followed by floods in North Bengal that affected 7 districts. These floods were caused by the shifting of the monsoon trough in the sub-Himalayan region.

== Effect of flood ==
=== Gangetic Bengal ===
Dhaniakhali of Hooghly district and Ghatal in West Midnapore district were the two worst affected areas. 1,79,321 hectares out of 10,82,285 hectares of paddy seedbeds were damaged. At least 50 people died while nearly 20 lakh (2 million) were affected in over 160 villages, which were inundated due to heavy rains. 2,301 people were evacuated from their houses and 2,02,957 hectare of agricultural land was submerged. Around 7,868 houses were entirely destroyed while 44,361 were partially damaged in West Bengal. The state lost around Rs.553 crores(US$86.6 million) due to the storm. An additional eleven people were reported to be killed in Jharkhand due to heavy rains.

Around 50 people have so far lost their lives, and according to government figures, about 11,974 hectares of land under paddy cultivation, and 23,096 hectare under vegetable cultivation, has been inundated. State government officials said the Subarnarekha river burst its banks after water was released from the Galudi dam in Jharkhand. Water was also released from Tilpara barrage in Birbhum. As a result, the Mayurakshi river inundated hundreds of acres of farmland. Water was reported to be rising fast in Chandrabhaga, Kopai and Bakreswar rivers in Birbhum district. In Hooghly district, embankments along the Darakeswar river were washed away and flood water gushed towards Arambagh town. In the 14 flood-hit districts in West Bengal, 27 lakh (2.7 million) people had been affected by flood. The government had set up 311 relief camps where over 47,000 people have taken shelter, adding it has also set up 131 medical camps. Over 16,000 animals were sheltered in relief camps for animals and veterinary doctors were looking after them. The government had also sent medicines, water pouches and other items to all the districts.

=== north Bengal ===
The floods claimed seven lives so far in the region, while about one lakh (100 thousand) people were affected in the five districts—60,000 of them in Alipurduar and Jalpaiguri alone —and many of them had taken shelter in the relief camps. Communication between Falakata and Madarihat in Jalpaiguri district remained cut off due to large-scale inundation and a majority of the residents of the two areas had taken shelter in the relief camps. Malda District has been flooded by overflow of river Fulhaar, Behula, Ganga and Mahananda. More than 2 lakhs (200 thousand) people have been affected by the flood conditions. 4 blocks of Malda district is under water including the English bazaar.

== Relief and rescue ==
More than 27,00,000 people in 106 blocks of 14 districts of West Bengal were affected by the flood. Around 311 relief camps were opened for them by the state government. Chief Minister Mamata Banerjee visited flood-hit areas in Amta and Udaynarayanpur in Howrah. She accused the DVC of releasing water indiscriminately. The Mamata Banerjee government sought help from the armed forces for the first time when eight districts in south Bengal were hit by flood. The air force pressed into service a helicopter to rescue 39 people who were trapped inside a two-storey house at Pratappur village in the Ghatal sub-division of West Midnapore district.

NDRF on 6 August 2017 team conducted rescue and relief operation at Ghatal, West Medenipur, WB and evacuated three persons They distributed relief material water pouches- 2200Nos, Dry Ration- 16 bags, Milk powder 6 kg, and Gur60 kg. So far teams have rescued 253 persons, evacuated 1029 persons and retrieved 05 dead bodies and distributed food 1500 Pkts, Water pouches/ bottles- 25564 nos.), dry rations ( Rice, Dal, Suger, Churaetc – 236 Bags, Baby food - 244 Ctns, Milk- 1056 Pkts, Gur -2205 kg, tarpoline (58 Nos, vegetables (540 kg and medicines.

== See also ==
- 2024 West Bengal floods
- Brahmaputra floods
- 2017 Gujarat flood
- 2017 Bangladesh landslides
