= Federation of Resident Doctors Association =

Indian professional association

Federation of Resident Doctors Association (FORDA) is a professional association for resident doctors in India. It was founded in January 2014 in Delhi.

== History ==
After series of meeting with representatives from medical colleges of Delhi, FORDA was formed on 12 February 2014.

Since its inception FORDA, it has raised issues pertaining to resident doctors. These include the 7½ years tenure of MBBS, security, duty hours, conducive working environment, better DDRs and other issues. FORDA has more than 30 government hospitals affiliated to it.

27 February 2015, Balvinder called a token strike. On 22–23 June 2015, a full labor strike was called. Almost 20000 resident doctors joined. ESMA was subsequently imposed on 23 June 2015. But that didn't end the strike till the authorities accepted their demands.

== Activities ==
In October 2015 FORDA complained about the unavailability of swine flu vaccination for medical staff. FORDA opposed the recommendations made by the 7th central pay commission for doctors.

On multiple occasions, FORDA has demanded that assaults on doctors be treated as non-bailable offence and that the Centre brings in a law for the medical fraternity amid rising incident s of violence at a time when they are in the frontline of the fight against Covid-19.

In March, 2020, FORDA urged for Health Insurance cover in case of morbidity and mortality of Doctors in line of duty, especially during the COVID-19 Pandemic.

In April 2020 FORDA wrote to Union Health Minister Harsh Vardhan and Delhi Health Minister Satyendra Jain, demanding separate accommodation for the Resident Doctors of various hospitals in India, who have been advised for home quarantine after COVID-19 pandemic duty, which was fulfilled by the government.

In May, 2020, FORDA raised the issue of non-uniform fees and bonds in medical education imposed by various State Governments. FORDA also raised the issue of non-uniform stipends of Resident Doctors and Interns in various states across the Nation and demanded implementation of "One Nation, One Stipend" as per the Central Residency Scheme.

In July, 2020, FORDA urged the Honourable Prime Minister of India to implement the long-pending Indian Medical Services Cadre, in line with IAS and IPS. The creation of the Indian Medical Services (IMS) cadre became more relevant during the COVID-19 Pandemic, so that doctors from various specialities can devise effective strategies for controlling the epidemic and improving the overall healthcare system in the future. Subsequently, the National Working Group (NWG) submitted its report.

In June, 2021, FORDA submitted "Suggestive Measures to Stop Violence against Doctors" to the Honourable Union Health Minister following which several meetings were convened by the Director General of Health Services (DGHS) along with various stakeholders for reviewing the suggestions for implementation in healthcare institutions. November-December 2021, FORDA protested against the multiple delays and postponement of NEET-PG Counselling 2021. While there was delay in admission of Resident Doctors in healthcare institutions of the nation, the existing batches of Resident Doctors were overworked and exhausted after dealing with two consecutive waves of COVID-19 Pandemic. The month-long protest across the nation was finally called off on 31st December, 2021, after several rounds of meeting and discussion with concerned authorities. The much delayed Counselling commenced after judgement by the Honourable Supreme Court of India in January, 2022, paving the way for expedited admission of fresh batch of Resident Doctors.
