= Panihati =

- City
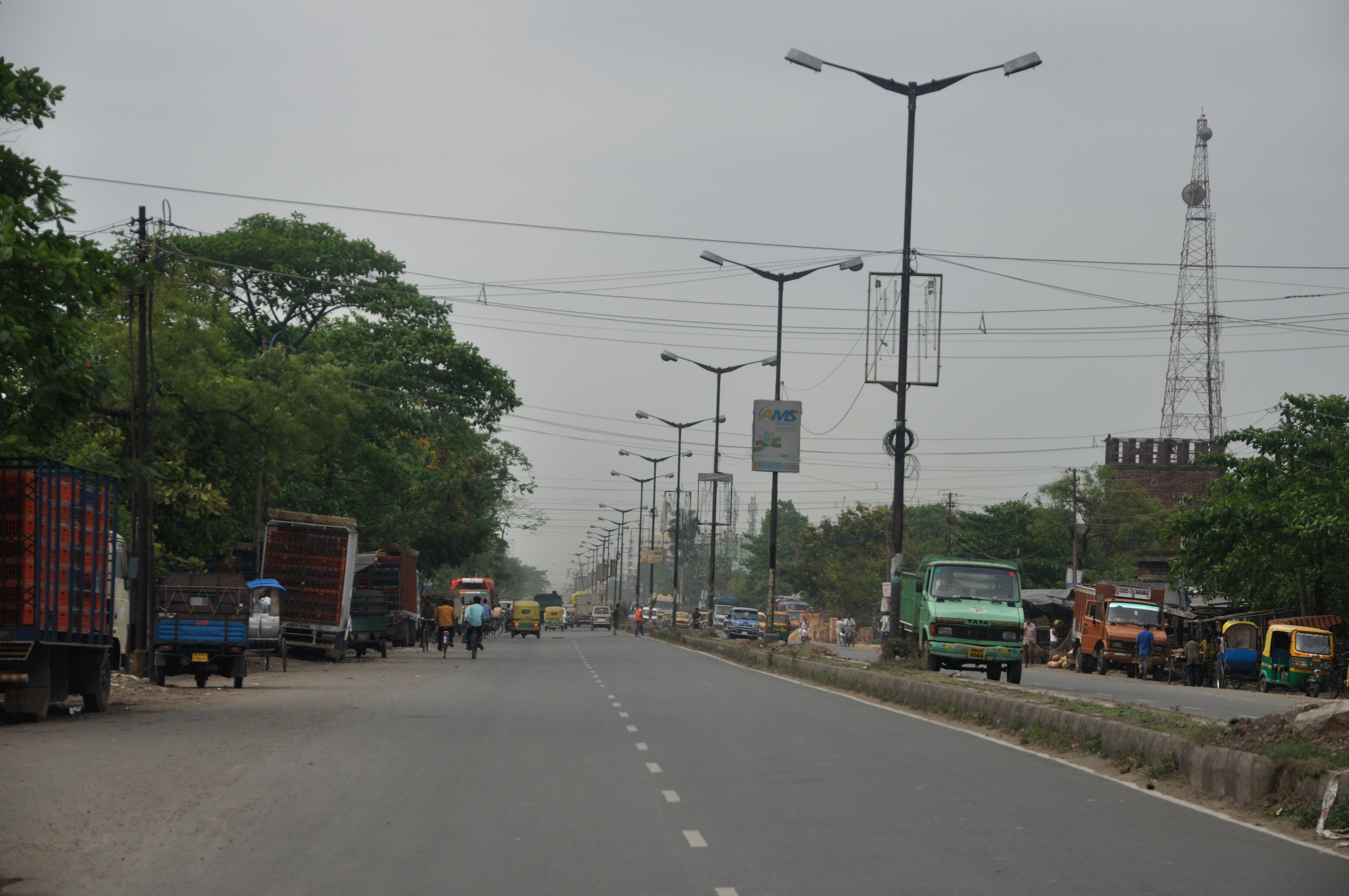
- B.T. Road in Panihati

- Location in West Bengal, India Panihati (India)
- Coordinates: 22.69°N 88.37°E
- Country: India
- State: West Bengal
- Division: Presidency
- District: North 24 Parganas

Government
  - Type: Municipality
  - Body: Panihati Municipality
  - Chairman: Somnath Dey

Area
  - Total: 19.38 km^{2} (7.48 sq mi)
- Elevation: 13 m (43 ft)

Population (2011)
  - Total: 377,347
  - Density: 19,470/km^{2} (50,430/sq mi)

Languages
  - Official: Bengali, English
- Time zone: UTC+5:30 (IST)
- PIN: 700109, 700110, 700111, 700112, 700113, 700114, 700115
- Telephone code: +91 33
- Vehicle registration: WB
- Lok Sabha constituency: Dum Dum
- Vidhan Sabha constituency: Panihati
- Website: panihatimunicipality.in

Panihati is a city and a municipality of North 24 Parganas district in the Indian state of West Bengal. It is a part of the area covered by Kolkata Metropolitan Development Authority (KMDA).

== History ==
There is a legendary belief that Maharaja Chandraketu of Deganga established a garh (fort) at Panihati in the 13th century. There is an association of goddess Bhawani with the fort. In the early days when river transport was the primary means of communication, Panihati was a major trading and business centre, then known as Pannyahati (Emporium for Merchandise). Scholars feel that the name has come from the word Pannyahatic. Panihati is mentioned in several Vaishnava Padavali literary texts – Chaitanya Mangal Kavya by Jayananda and Lochandas in the 16th century, Sri Chaitanya Bhagawat by Brindaban Das in 1548, Bansi Bistar by Nityannda, Vaishnava Namdeva by Debaki Nandan, Sri Chaitanya Charitamritam by Krishnadas Kabiraj in 1580–1610, Bhakti Ratnakar and Chaitanya Chandroday. Panihati Municipality was established in 1900. This place is said to be visited by Sri Chaitanya Mahaprabhu on his way to Puri & later by his close associate Nityananda too, due to which Gaudiya Vaishnavas consider this place holy.

Gandhi Memorial Asram or Sodepur Khadi Pratisthan was established by Satish Chandra Dasgupta in 1921 at Panihati. Mahatma Gandhi himself visited and stayed there several times in 1939, 1945, 1946 and 1947.

== Geography ==
Cities and towns in the southern portion of Barrackpore subdivision in North 24 Parganas district
M: municipal city/ town, CT: census town,
N: neighbourhood/ administrative location
Owing to space constraints in the small map, the actual locations in a larger map may vary slightly

=== Location ===
Panihati has an average elevation of 13 metres (42 feet).

96% of the population of Barrackpore subdivision (partly presented in the map alongside, all places marked in the map are linked in the full screen map) lives in urban areas. In 2011, it had a density of population of 10,967 per km^{2}. The subdivision has 16 municipalities and 24 census towns.

For most of the cities/ towns information regarding density of population is available in the Infobox. Population data is not available for neighbourhoods. It is available for the entire Municipal area and thereafter ward-wise.

Panihati is bounded by Bandipur, Iswaripur and Karna Madhabpur on the north, Manish Pota, Bilkanda, Jugberia, Muragachha and Teghari on the east, North Dumdum and Kamarhati on the south, and Khardaha on the west.

Panihati Municipality is located on B.T. Road, Kolkata - 700114 at the western side of Sodepur railway station. Besides Panihati town, Panihati Municipality also has jurisdiction over Sukchar, Sodepur, Natagarh, Panshila, Ghola and Agarpara.

=== Police station ===
Ghola police station under Barrackpore Police Commissionerate has jurisdiction over Panihati Municipal areas.

== Demographics ==
=== Population ===
Historical population
Year	Pop.	±%
1901	11,178	—
1911	11,118	−0.5%
1921	10,161	−8.6%
1931	11,699	+15.1%
1941	27,410	+134.3%
1951	49,514	+80.6%
1961	93,749	+89.3%
1971	148,046	+57.9%
1981	205,718	+39.0%
1991	275,990	+34.2%
2001	348,438	+26.3%
2011	377,347	+8.3%
Source: Census of India

As per the 2011 Census of India, Panihati had a total population of 377,347, of which 189,446 (50%) were males and 187,901 (50%) were females. Population below 6 years was 26,215. The total number of literates in Panihati was 322,770 (91.92% of the population over 6 years).

As of 2001 India census, Panihati had a population of 348,379. Males constitute 52% of the population and females 48%. Panihati has an average literacy rate of 82%, higher than the national average of 74.4%: male literacy is 85% and female literacy is 79%. In Panihati, 8% of the population is under 6 years of age.

=== Languages ===
Languages spoken in Panihati City (2011)
1. Bengali (89.0%)
2. Hindi (8.00%)
3. Urdu (1.68%)
4. Odia (0.39%)
5. Nepali (0.08%)
6. Others (0.63%)

=== Kolkata Urban Agglomeration ===
The following Municipalities, Census Towns and other locations in Barrackpore subdivision were part of Kolkata Urban Agglomeration in the 2011 census: Kanchrapara (M), Jetia (CT), Halisahar (M), Balibhara (CT), Naihati (M), Bhatpara (M), Kaugachhi (CT), Garshyamnagar (CT), Garulia (M), Ichhapur Defence Estate (CT), North Barrackpur (M), Barrackpur Cantonment (CB), Barrackpore (M), Jafarpur (CT), Ruiya (CT), Titagarh (M), Khardaha (M), Bandipur (CT), Panihati (M), Muragachha (CT) New Barrackpore (M), Chandpur (CT), Talbandha (CT), Patulia (CT), Kamarhati (M), Baranagar (M), South Dumdum (M), North Dumdum (M), Dum Dum (M), Noapara (CT), Babanpur (CT), Teghari (CT), Nanna (OG), Chakla (OG), Srotribati (OG) and Panpur (OG).

== Infrastructure ==
As per the District Census Handbook 2011, Panihati municipal city covered an area of 19.38 km^{2}. Amongst the civic amenities it had 375 km of roads and both open and covered drains. Amongst the medical facilities It had 48 medicine shops. Amongst the educational facilities It had 116 primary schools, 123 middle schools, 132 secondary schools, 162 senior secondary schools and 12 non-formal education centres. Amongst the social, recreational and cultural facilities it had 1 orphanage home, 1 stadium, 3 cinema/ theatres, 10 auditorium/ community halls, 78 public libraries and 20 reading rooms. Amongst the commodities manufactured were railway wagons, pumps and waterproofs. It had 14 bank branches.

According to Barrackpore administration the educational facilities available in Panihati are: 100 primary schools, 2 English-medium schools, 12 secondary schools, 10 higher secondary schools, 2 degree colleges, 2 engineering colleges and 1 medical/dental college. Other facilities are: 153.18 km pucca roads, 197 km kutcha roads, 249 km pucca drains, 410 km kutcha drains, 5 municipal markets, 10 private markets, 9 post offices/ sub post offices, 1 ferry ghat (Mahatsabtala-Konnagar), 3 cinema halls (Padma, Rathindra, Mini Rathindra), 12 play grounds (8 big, 4 small), 1 electric crematorium, 3 burning ghats and 2 Muslim burial grounds. 33,000 houses have water connection and there are 2,842 street taps.

See also Cities and towns in Barrackpore subdivision

== Economy ==
=== Industry ===
The following industries are/ were located in Panihati:

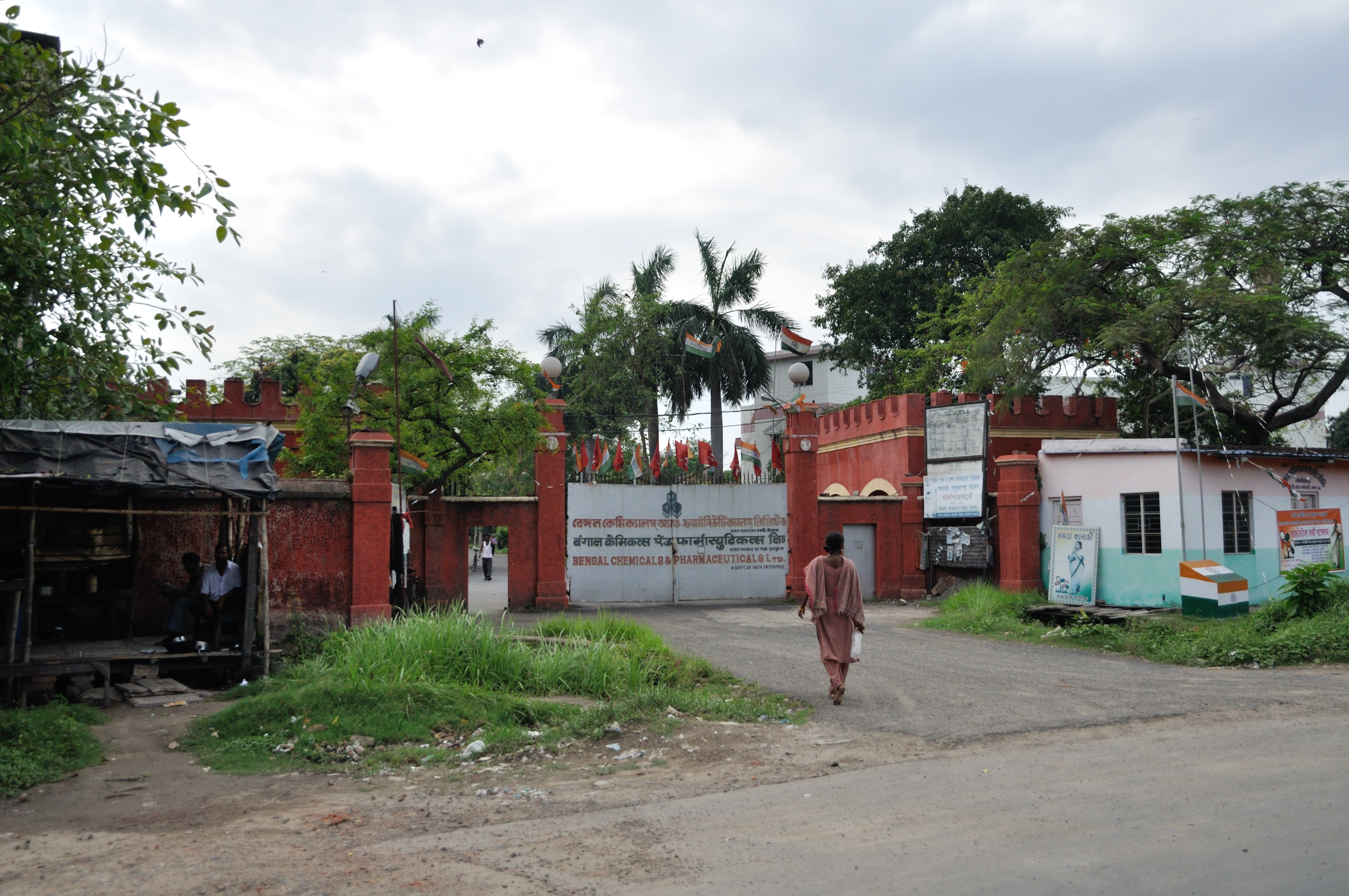
Bengal Chemicals and Pharmaceuticals at Panihati

- Bengal Chemicals and Pharmaceuticals, founded by Acharya Prafulla Chandra Ray with its main plant on Maniktala Main Road, now in Kankurgachi neighbourhood of Kolkata, established a plant at Panihati in 1920. It is presently a central-government undertaking.
- Bengal Waterproof Works Private Ltd. (popular for their Duckback brand), was established in 1920 at Kolkata and shifted to Panihati in 1932 by four brothers – Surendranath, Jogendramohan, Ajitmohan, and Bishnupada Bose.
- Basanti Cotton Mill was established by Subodh Chandra Mitra in 1934. Named after Basanti Devi, wife of Deshbandhu Chittaranjan Das, it was inaugurated by Rabindranath Tagore and presided over by Acharya Prafulla Chandra Ray. It is no more in operation. Basanti Cotton Mill was closed down in 1987.
- Bangasree and Sodepur Cotton Mills, founded by Rai Bahadur D.N.Chowdhury and Chandrachur Chowdhury, were subsequently taken over by National Textile Corporation.
- Bangodaya Cotton Mill was locked out in 1984. The factory sheds have been cleared out and Peerless Abasan now occupies the space.

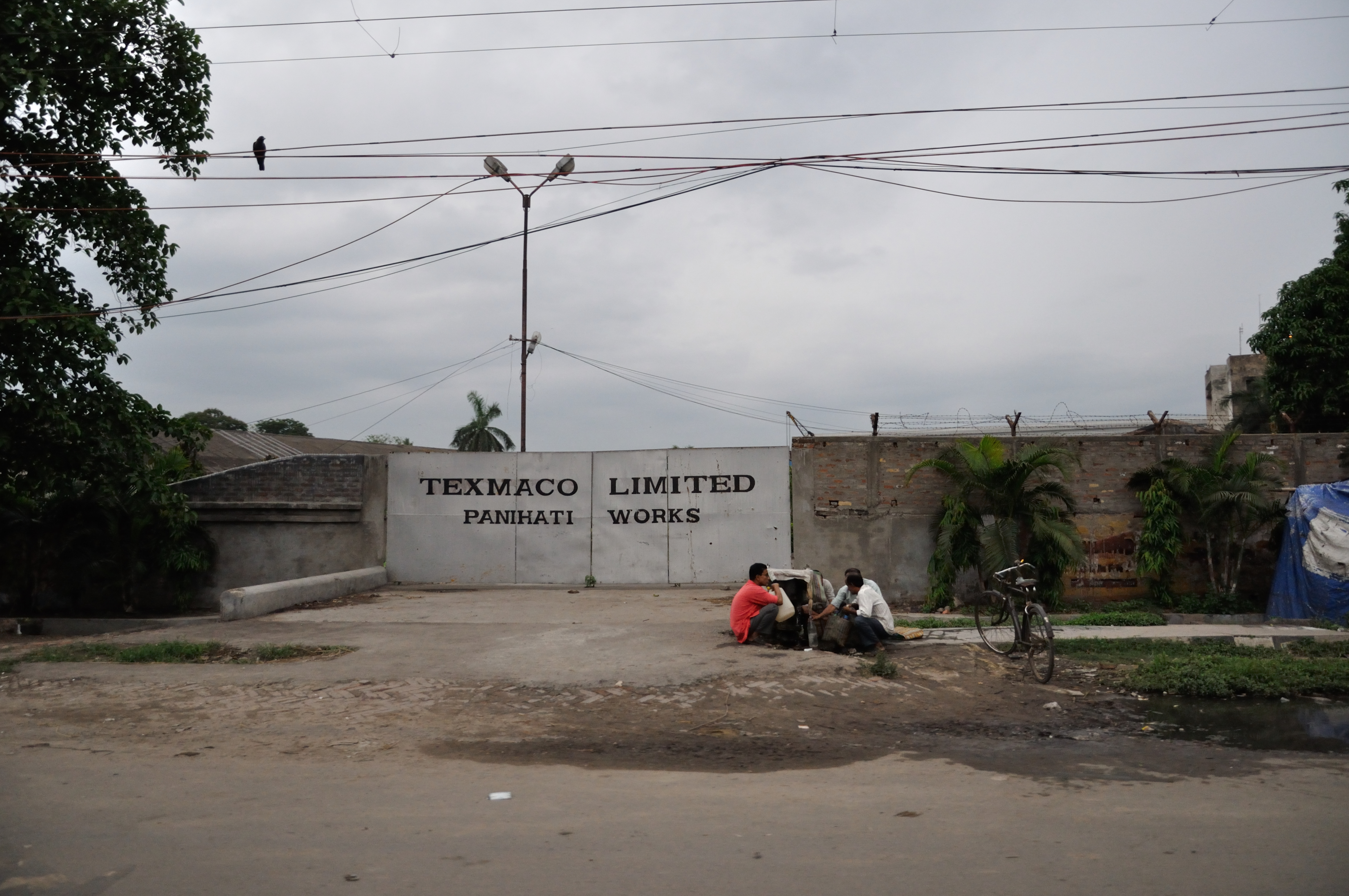
Panihati Works of Texmaco

- Texmaco Rail and Engineering Ltd., with 5 manufacturing units spread across Kamarhati and Panihati municipalities. Founded in 1939 by K.K. Birla, and now the flagship company of the Adventz Group, headed by Saroj Poddar.

=== KMDA ===
Panihati municipality is included in the Kolkata Metropolitan Area for which the KMDA is the statutory planning and development authority.

== Transport ==
=== Rail ===
Panihati has two important railway stations nearby on Sealdah-Ranaghat line by the Eastern Railway suburban network: Sodepur railway station and Agarpara railway station.

=== Road ===
The Barrackpore Trunk Road (B.T. Road) which passes through the heart of the town provides ample road transport. The Sodepur-Barasat Road also starts from here.

== Healthcare ==
Medical facilities in Panihati include Panihati State General Hospital with 150 beds and Panihati Municipal Maternity Home with 10 beds.

North 24 Parganas district (under Kolkata Metropolitan area) has been identified as one of the areas where ground water is affected by arsenic contamination.

The famous scientist Kishori Mohan Bandyopadhyay who had assisted Ronald Ross in his malaria research work and was awarded a gold medal in 1903 for his pioneering work by King Edward VII of Britain was a resident of Panihati.

== Education ==
Panihati Mahavidyalaya was established at Sodepur in 1976. It offers honours courses in Bengali, English, Sanskrit, history, philosophy, political science, education, geography, physics, chemistry, mathematics, zoology, food & nutrition, computer science, commerce and general courses in BA, B Sc and B Com.

Guru Nanak Institute of Technology, a private engineering college, was established, near Sodepur in 2003.

Narula Institute of Technology, a private engineering college, was established at Agarpara in 2001. Guru Nanak Institute of Dental Sciences and Research, a private dental college located in Panihati, Kolkata, in the Indian state of West Bengal. St. Xavier's Institution (Panihati) and Sodepur High School, located in Panihati.
