= Gandhi Memorial Asram =

Heritage institution in West Bengal

Gandhi Memorial Asram popularly known as Sodepur Khadi Ashram is a heritage institution of Sodepur, Panihati, North 24 Parganas in the Indian state of West Bengal.

== History ==
This Ashram was established in 1924 by the Gandhian activist, scientist and inventor, Satish Chandra Dasgupta, former superintendent of Bengal Chemicals. This was founded as a Khadi Pratisthan. The institution occupies an important place in Indian Freedom Struggle and which Mahatma Gandhi himself called his second home like Sabarmati Ashram. He visited the place several times during the period of 1939 to 1947. Topmost leader of Indian National Congress came here. Dr. Rajendra Prasad, Subhas Chandra Bose, Jawahar Lal Nehru, Vallabhbhai Patel, Sarat Chandra Bose, Syama Prasad Mukherjee, G. D. Birla, Khan Abdul Gaffar Khan, Sarojini Naidu, Huseyn Shaheed Suhrawardy visited the Ashram time to time. Subhash Chandra took his decision to leave Congress, launched All India Forward Bloc after the historic three days meeting held at Gandhi Memorial Asram.
