= Sodepur =

Sodepur Sodpur
- Neighbourhood
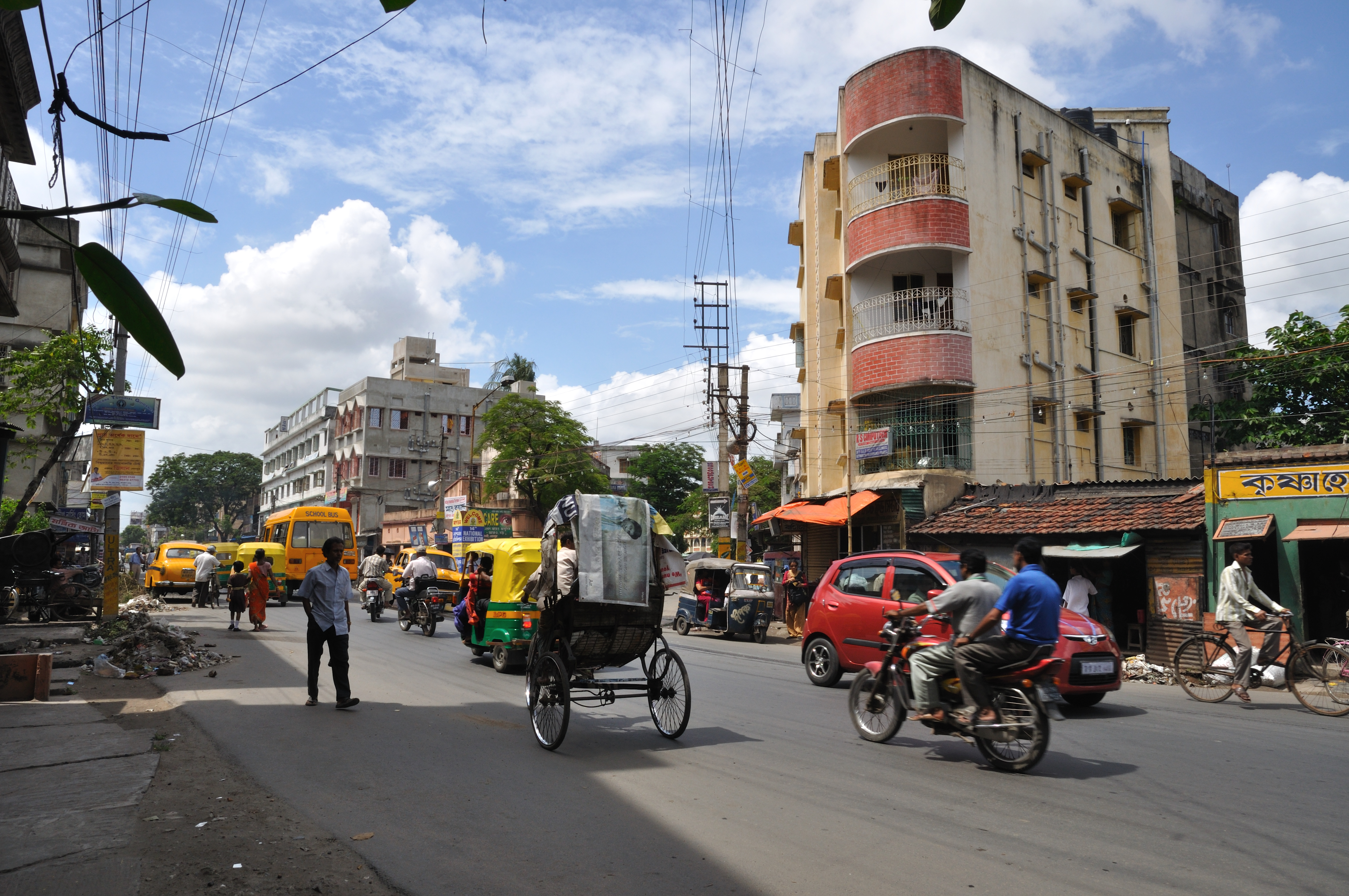
- Amarabati crossing near Sodepur rail overbridge

- Location in West Bengal, India Sodepur (India)
- Coordinates: 22°41′54″N 88°23′22″E
- Country: India
- State: West Bengal
- Division: Presidency
- District: North 24 Parganas

Government
  - Type: Municipality
  - Body: Panihati Municipality
- Elevation: 15 m (49 ft)

Languages
  - Official: Bengali, English
- Time zone: UTC+5:30 (IST)
- PIN: 700110, 7000113, 700114, 700115,
- Telephone code: +91 33
- Vehicle registration: WB
- Lok Sabha constituency: Dum Dum
- Vidhan Sabha constituency: Panihati

Sodepur (also known as Sodpur) is a neighbourhood in Panihati of North 24 Parganas district in the Indian state of West Bengal. It is a part of the area covered by Kolkata Metropolitan Development Authority (KMDA).

== History ==
There was once a community named Sayyid in this area from which the place was known as Sayyidpur or Sodepur. The Khadi Pratishthan (Ashram) of Sodepur (or Khadi Ashram Sodepur) has witnessed many events in the history of the country's independence movement. This Pratishthan was like Sabarmati near Sodepur station which Gandhiji himself called his 'second home'. Binda shaw line oldest line in Sodepur The importance of this Khadi Pratishthan is immense as it has witnessed many histories in the making. Several important decisions were taken by the national leaders on this premises.

== Geography ==
Cities and towns in the southern portion of Barrackpore subdivision in North 24 Parganas district
M: municipal city/ town, CT: census town,
N: neighbourhood/ administrative location
Owing to space constraints in the small map, the actual locations in a larger map may vary slightly

=== Location ===
Sodepur is located at 22.698214°N 88.38947689999998°E. It has an average elevation of 15 m (49 ft).

96% of the population of Barrackpore subdivision (partly presented in the map alongside, all places marked on the map are linked in the full screen map) lives in urban areas. In 2011, it had a density of population of 10,967 per km^{2}. The subdivision has 16 municipalities and 24 census towns.

For most of the cities/ towns information regarding density of population is available in the Infobox. Population data is not available for neighbourhoods. It is available for the entire municipal area and thereafter ward-wise.

=== Police station ===
Ghola and Khardaha police station under Barrackpore Police Commissionerate has jurisdiction over Panihati and New Barrackpore Municipal areas.

There is a police outpost at Sodepur. Main police station - Khardah Police Station.

=== Kolkata Urban Agglomeration ===
The following Municipalities, Census Towns and other locations in Barrackpore subdivision were part of Kolkata Urban Agglomeration in the 2011 census: Kanchrapara (M), Jetia (CT), Halisahar (M), Balibhara (CT), Naihati (M), Bhatpara (M), Kaugachhi (CT), Garshyamnagar (CT), Garulia (M), Ichhapur Defence Estate (CT), North Barrackpur (M), Barrackpur Cantonment (CB), Barrackpore (M), Jafarpur (CT), Ruiya (CT), Titagarh (M), Khardaha (M), Bandipur (CT), Panihati (M), Muragachha (CT) New Barrackpore (M), Chandpur (CT), Talbandha (CT), Patulia (CT), Kamarhati (M), Baranagar (M), South Dumdum (M), North Dumdum (M), Dum Dum (M), Noapara (CT), Babanpur (CT), Teghari (CT), Nanna (OG), Chakla (OG), Srotribati (OG) and Panpur (OG).

Sodepur is a part of Panihati Municipality.

== Transport ==
Metro

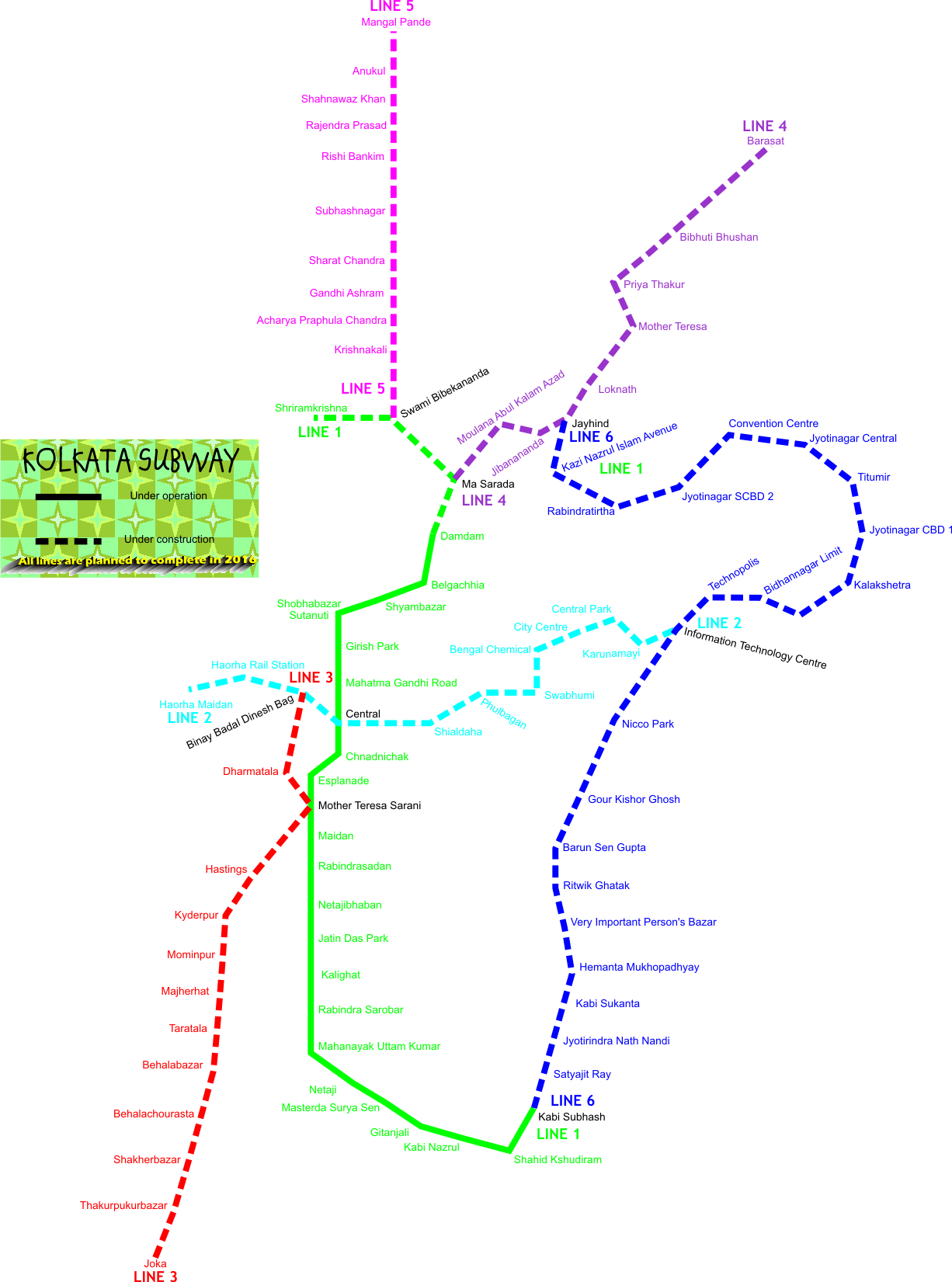
Kolkata new proposed Metro Pink Line (Baranagar - Barrackpore). Nearest Metro rail station is Baranagar.

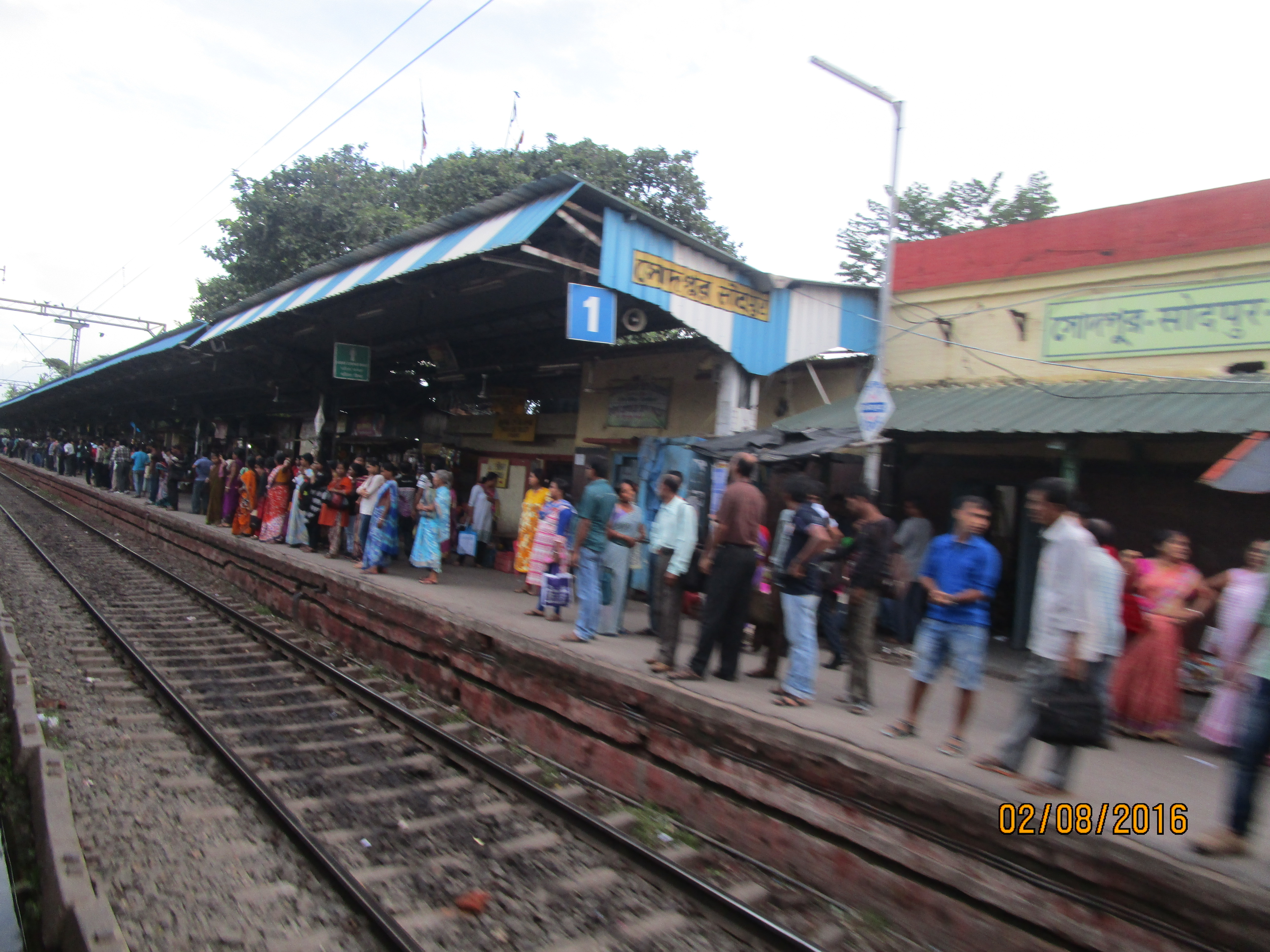
Sodepur railway station

=== Rail ===
Sodepur is well connected through Sodepur railway station on the Sealdah-Ranaghat line by the Eastern Railway suburban network.

=== Commuters ===
Around a total of 32 lakh people from all around the city commute to Kolkata daily for work. In the Sealdah-Krishnanagar section there are 34 trains that carry commuters from 30 railway stations. In the Sealdah-Shantipur section 32 trains carry commuters from 29 stations.

=== Road ===
The B.T. Road which passes through the heart of the town provides ample road transport. The Sodepur-Barasat Road also starts from here. East and west parts of Sodepur are connected with a Rail Overbridge named Acharya Prafulla Chandra Setu (Sodepur Bridge), which was inaugurated in 1995.

=== Bus ===
==== Private Bus ====
- 56 Howrah Station - Ruiya Purbapara
- 78 Esplanade - Barrackpore Court
- 78/1 Babughat - Rahara Bazar/Parthapur
- 81/1 Barasat - Rajchandrapur
- 214 Babughat - Sajirhat
- 214A Esplanade - Sodepur Girja
- DN43 Barasat Checkpost - Dakshineswar

==== WBTC Bus ====
CTC Bus

- C28 Barrackpore Court - Howrah Station
- C45 Ghola Muragacha - Howrah Station

CSTC Bus

- E32 Nilganj - Howrah Station
- S11 Nilganj - Esplanade
- S32 Barrackpore Court - Howrah Station
- S58 Barrackpore Court - Salt Lake Karunamoyee
- AC20 Barrackpore Court - Santragachi railway station (8 AM to 9 AM and afternoon 2 PM to 3 PM. In the Evening, the Bus plies from B.B.D. Bagh to Dunlop.)

==== Bus Routes Without Numbers ====
- Howrah Station - Madhyamgram
- Sodepur Girja - Uluberia Court
- Barrackpore Court - Salap
- Barrackpore Court - Mourigram railway station
- Lalkuthi - Howrah Station

== Education ==
The oldest school at Sodepur is Sodepur High School which is affiliated to West Bengal Board. It was established in 1853.

The other schools here are:

- Natagarh Sri Sri Ramkrishna Vidyamandir (Ramkrishnapur), affiliated to West Bengal Board (Bengali medium)
- Swami Vivekananda Seva Sumity Vidhyalaya (Buniyadi School), affiliated to West Bengal Board (Bengali medium)
- Chandrachur Vidyapith, for boys, girls and primary, affiliated to West Bengal Board (Bengali medium)
- Sukchar Karmadaksha Chandrachur Vidyayatan, for boys, and primary, affiliated to West Bengal Board (Bengali medium)
- Sukchar Satadal balika vidyayatan, for girls, and primary, affiliated to West Bengal Board (Bengali medium)
- Desbandhu Sikshyatan, affiliated to West Bengal Board (Bengali medium)
- Sushil Chandra Balika Vidyalay, affiliated to West Bengal Board (Bengali medium)
- Central Point School affiliated to CISCE Board (English medium)
- Park Institution, affiliated to CISCE Board (English medium)
- National Model School, H.B. Town, affiliated to CISCE Board (English medium)
- St. Pauls, Amrabati, affiliated to CISCE Board (English medium)
- St. Xavier's Institution, affiliated to CISCE
- SUSHIL KRISHNA SIKSHAYATAN School (Bengali medium)
- Ramakrishna Vivekananda Mission Debarati Roy Memorial Institute (English Medium) West Bengal Board
- Sodepur Nabodoy Institute affiliated to West Bengal Board (Bengali Medium)

In the area of higher education, there are many colleges:

- Panihati Mahavidyalaya, affiliated to West Bengal State University, government-aided
- Guru Nanak Institute of Technology, private
- Guru Nanak Institute of Hotel Management, private
- Guru Nanak Institute of Dental Sciences and Research and Hospital, private
- Guru Nanak Institute of Pharmaceutical Science and Technology, private
- JIS University, private
- Metropolitan Homoeopathic Medical College & Hospital

== Employment ==
The Skill Institute offers new approach to creating more employable youth in Bengal, by using a three-pronged approach of policy aggregation, skill development and job creation. It was started by London School of Economics and University College London alumni.
