= Nilgunj Road =

Road in West Bengal, India

Nilgunj Road connects Belgharia to Sodepur via Agarpara in North 24 Parganas. It runs parallel to B.T. Road. Narula Institute of Technology, Agarpara and Guru Nanak Institute of Technology, Sodepur are located on the road.
