= Sukchar =

Sukchar Sukhchar
- Neighbourhood
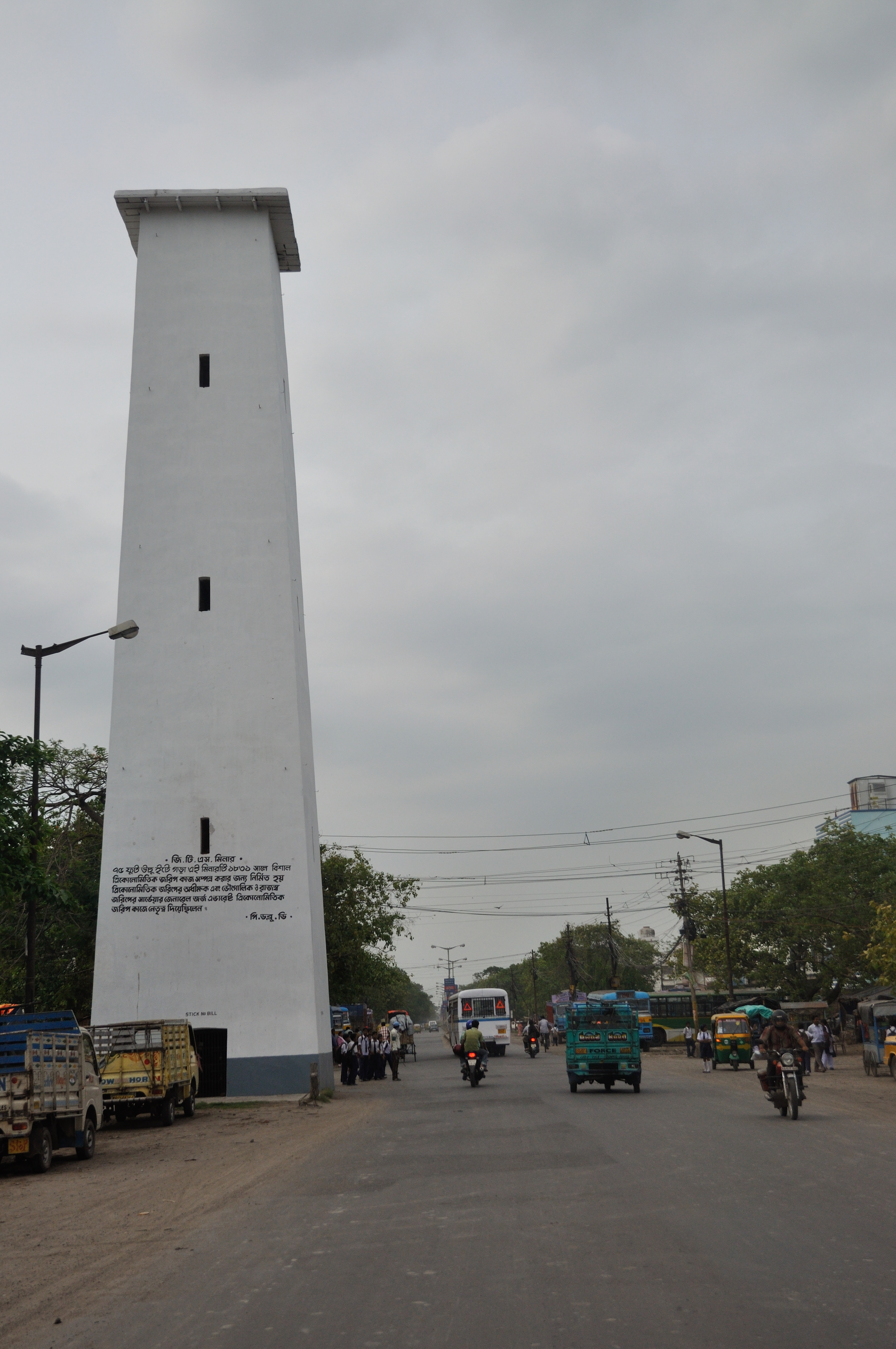
- Great Trigonometrical Survey Tower at Sukchar Church

- Location in West Bengal, India Sukchar (India)
- Coordinates: 22.71°N 88.39°E
- Country: India
- State: West Bengal
- Division: Presidency
- District: North 24 Parganas

Government
  - Type: Municipality
  - Body: Panihati Municipality

Area
  - Total: 1.55 km^{2} (0.60 sq mi)
- Elevation: 15 m (49 ft)

Languages
  - Official: Bengali, English
- Time zone: UTC+5:30 (IST)
- PIN: 700115
- Telephone code: +91 33
- Vehicle registration: WB
- Lok Sabha constituency: Dum Dum
- Vidhan Sabha constituency: Panihati
- Website: www.panihatimunicipality.in

Sukchar (also known as Sukhchar) is a neighbourhood in Panihati of North 24 Parganas district in the Indian state of West Bengal. It is a part of the area covered by Kolkata Metropolitan Development Authority (KMDA).

== Geography ==
=== Kolkata Urban Agglomeration ===
The following Municipalities, Census Towns and other locations in Barrackpore subdivision were part of Kolkata Urban Agglomeration in the 2011 census: Kanchrapara (M), Jetia (CT), Halisahar (M), Balibhara (CT), Naihati (M), Bhatpara (M), Kaugachhi (CT), Garshyamnagar (CT), Garulia (M), Ichhapur Defence Estate (CT), North Barrackpur (M), Barrackpur Cantonment (CB), Barrackpore (M), Jafarpur (CT), Ruiya (CT), Titagarh (M), Khardaha (M), Bandipur (CT), Panihati (M), Muragachha (CT) New Barrackpore (M), Chandpur (CT), Talbandha (CT), Patulia (CT), Kamarhati (M), Baranagar (M), South Dumdum (M), North Dumdum (M), Dum Dum (M), Noapara (CT), Babanpur (CT), Teghari (CT), Nanna (OG), Chakla (OG), Srotribati (OG) and Panpur (OG).

== Transport ==
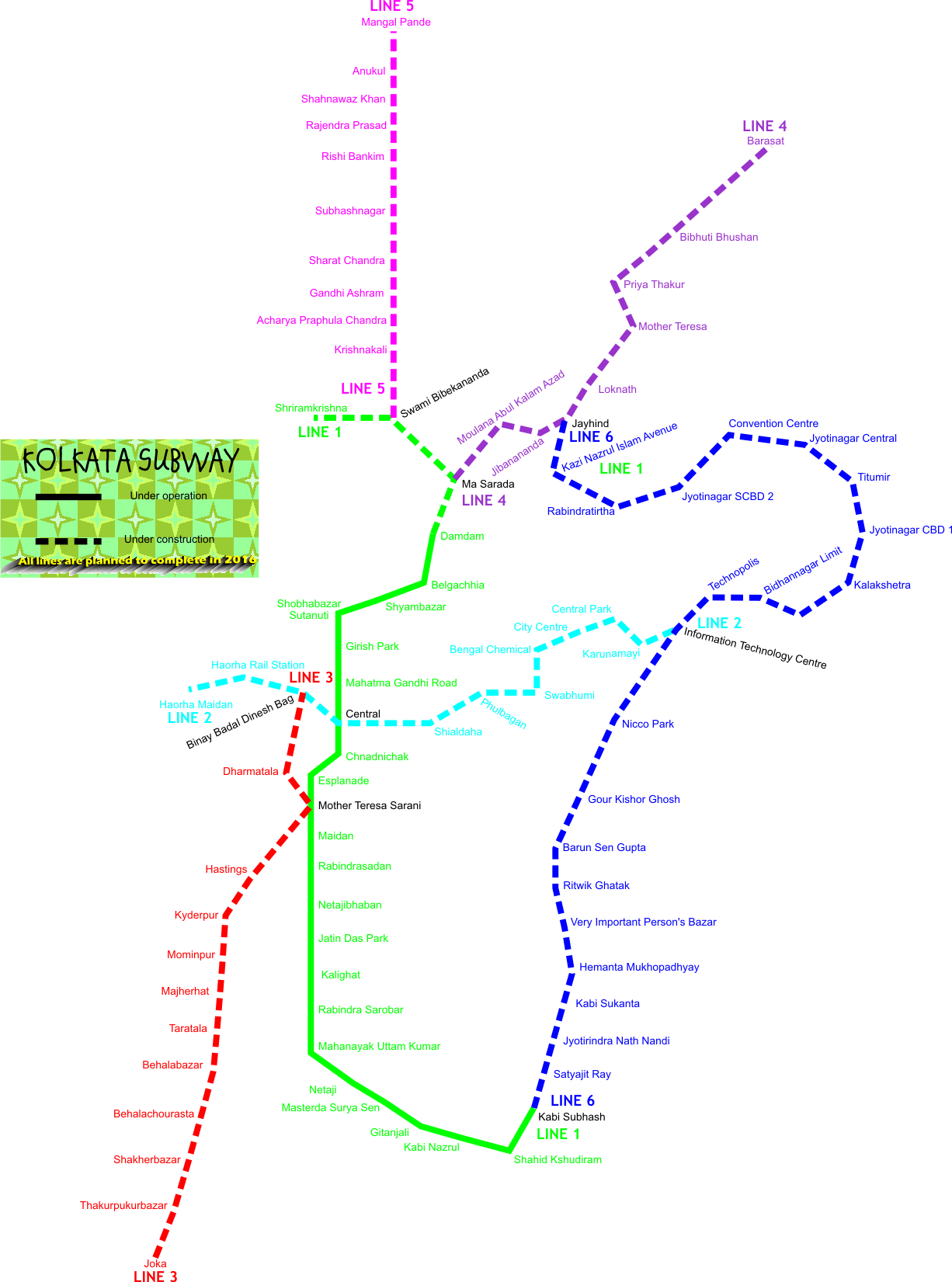
Kolkata new proposed Metro Pink Line (Baranagar - Barrackpore)

The place is well connected by both roadways and railways. B.T. Road passes through Sukchar.

78 is the most frequent bus in Sukchar which runs from Barrackpore Court to Esplanade. Besides many buses connect Sukchar to various neighbourhoods - 81/1 (Barasat to Rajchandrapur), 214A (Sodepur Girja/Sukchar Church to Esplanade), C28 and S32 (Barrackpore Court to Howrah Station), S11 (Nilganj to Esplanade), E32 (Nilganj to Howrah Station) etc.

Khardaha railway station and Sodepur railway station on the Sealdah-Ranaghat line are located nearby.

== Education ==
The high schools here are:

- Sukchar karmadaksha chandrachur vidyayatan (for boys) (Bengali medium),
- Sukchar satadal balika vidyayatan (for girls) (Bengali medium),
- St. Xavier's Institution (Co-Education) (English medium),
- Sukchar Kedarnath Poddar High School (Co-Education) (Hindi medium)

The primary schools here are:

- Sukchar Bhawanipur Prathomik Vidyayatan (Co-Education) (Bengali medium),
- Sukchar Kedarnath Poddar Primary School (Co-Education) (Hindi medium),
- Sukchar Nolin Smriti Vidyayatan (Co-Education) (Bengali medium),
- Sukchar Jayprakash Nagar Prathomik Vidyayatan (Co-Education) (Bengali medium),
- St. Xavier's Institution (Co-Education) (English medium),
- Sukchar Kalitala Primary School (Co-Education) (Bengali medium),
- sukchar satadal balika vidyayatan (Prathamik Vibhag) (Co-Education) (Bengali medium)

Most of the people in Sukchar are service personnel either in Government sector, semi- government sector or in private sectors. There are some industries running successfully in the vicinity of this area. Sukchar has got many historical aspects like resthouse of Rabindranath Tagore, Baromandir Ghat, Kalitala Ghat, Bazar Para Ghat.

== Religious places ==
- Sukchar Kalitala Siddheshwari Kali Mandir
- Kathia Baba Ashram
- Balak Brahmachari Ashram
- Tin Murti Mandir
- Sri Sai Devsthan
- Dayanada Ashram
