= Ghola (disambiguation) =

A ghola is a fictional creature in the Dune universe. It may also refer to:

- Ghola, North 24 Parganas, a neighbourhood in Panihati, North 24 Parganas, West Bengal, India
- Chandpur, Ghola, a census town in Barrackpore II CD Block, North 24 Parganas, West Bengal, India
- Betbaria Ghola, a railway station on the Sealdah South lines, West Bengal, India
