= Kishori Mohan Bandyopadhyay =

Indian scientist, social worker

- Born: 1883; Bowbazar, Calcutta, Bengal Presidency, British India
- Died: 20 August 1929 (aged 45–46); Panihati, Calcutta, Bengal Presidency, British India
- Occupations: Scientist, Social activist, writer
- Known for: Anti-malaria efforts, social work
- Family: Samir Roychoudhury (grandson)
- Awards: King Edward VII's Gold Medal (1903)

Kishori Mohan Bandyopadhyay (1883–20 August 1929) was an Indian malaria researcher, educator and social worker who contributed to the study of malaria transmission as a research assistant to Ronald Ross. In 1898, he joined Ross's research team at the Presidency General Hospital in Calcutta, where he assisted in laboratory investigations and the collection of patient samples. After Ross won the 1902 Nobel Prize, prominent Indian scientists and intellectuals made reprsentations to Lord Curzon, the Viceroy of India, and subsequently Bandyopadhyay was awarded the King Edward VII's Gold Medal in 1903.

In 1918, he became the founding secretary of the Anti-Malaria Cooperative Society at Panihati, which promoted sanitation, mosquito control and public health education. In 1927, he co-founded the Panihati Co-operative Bank to provide financial assistance to rural communities.

== Early life and education ==
Bandyopadhyay was born in the Bowbazer area of Kolkata at his maternal grandparents' home. In 1901 he passed the entrance examination for the Ripon Collegiate School. In 1903 he passed the F A examination from Ripon College (now known as Surendranath College) as well as the Addya examination in Sanskrit. He did not pass his BA exam. He later taught at B M S Girls School in Kolkata and thereafter at Trannath High School of Panihati, where he worked till 1914. In 1914, he re-did his BA as a private candidate and passed. Two years later, he passed the Bachelor of Laws at the University of Calcutta.

== Social services ==
Bandyopadhyay was a noted social worker of that time. He under the influence of the revolutionary Mokhyada Charan Samadhyayi who started gymnasium in the village of Panihati. In 1908 he married Anadinath Chatterjee of Panihati's sister. He lived in the house of Anadinath in Panihati, on the opposite side of Nilambati, Panihati, which was later demolished and rebuilt into apartments. The gymnasium started by Kishori Mohan became the Panihati Club in 1914 and it is still now active as a social organisation. In 1918, Dr. Gopal Chandra Chattopadhyay started a public health movement to control the malaria epidemic. Kishori Mohan became his ardent co-worker.

== Anti Malaria Cooperative Society ==
In 1918, a meeting of the villagers took place at Trannath High School. There, Dr Gopal Chandra Chattopadhyay established that the spread of malaria could be controlled through sanitary consciousness of the common people. The Anti Malaria Cooperative Society was formed in India at Panihati on 24 March 1918 with 27 people. Chattopadhyay was the organization's first president and Bandopahyay its first Secretary. Within three months by cleaning ponds, drains of the village, removing garbage and spraying Kerosene oil, malaria was under control. This success story encouraged the villagers of the neighbourhood, and Anti Malaria Cooperative Societies were formed. That movement resulted in the formation of the Central Anti Malaria Cooperative Society in a meeting held on 8 April 1919 at Rammohan Library Hall in Calcutta. The Central Society was presided over by Dr Kailash Chandra Bose with Chattopadhyay as Secretary.

Kishorimohan continued as the Secretary of the Panihati Society till 1923. He became busy in propagating the message of sanitary conscience throughout undivided Bengal with the help of Magic Lantern. The Central Society started its own bilingual monthly journal 'Sonar Bangla' under the Editorship of Bipin Chandra Pal and Chattopadhyay. Kishori Mohan was a regular contributor to this journal.

In 1928, Dr. Gopal Chandra Chatterjee started the movement of home crofting. Kishori Mohan contributed a lot to make this movement a successful one. Kishori Mohan Bandyopadhyay also co-founded 'The Panihati Cooperative Bank' in 1927. He was elected by the villagers in the Panihati Municipality as Commissioner twice.

== Awards and honors ==
Following Ross's winning the Nobel Prize in Physiology or Medicine in 1902, several prominent Indian scientists and intellectuals, including Jagadish Chandra Bose, Prafulla Chandra Ray, Upendranath Brahmachari, Brajendra Nath Seal, Sivanath Sastri and Surendranath Banerjee, petitioned Lord Curzon to recognise Bandyopadhyay's contributions to malaria research. In 1903, he was awarded King Edward VII's Gold Medal, presented by the Duke of Connaught during the 1903 Delhi Durbar.

Bandyopadhyay received a gold medal for his contribution to anti-malaria efforts at the annual conference of the Central Anti-Malaria Cooperative Society for his contributions to the movement. Panihati municipality has a street named Kishori Mohan Banerjee Road.

== Death ==
Bandyopadhyay's health took a turn for the worse due to his long hours of work. He contracted pneumonia and later meningitis. At the age of 46, he died in his Panihati residence on 20 August 1929. He was survived by his wife and six children. A condolence meeting in his memory was held on 1 September 1929 at Trannath High School.
