= Sodepur High School =

Secondary school in Kolkata, India

Sodepur High School is a school located at Sodepur Station Road, Sodepur, Kolkata, India. This is affiliated to the West Bengal Board of Secondary Education for Madhyamik Pariksha (10th Board exams), and to the West Bengal Council of Higher Secondary Education for Higher Secondary Examination (12th Board exams). The school was established in 1853 led by Ishwar Chandra Chattopadhyay and Kedarnath Bandopadhyay.

== See also ==
- Education in India
- List of schools in India
- Education in West Bengal
