= Ghola, North 24 Parganas =

Ghola
- Neighbourhood
- Location in West Bengal, India Ghola (India)
- Coordinates: 22.6964960°N 88.4089351°E
- Country: India
- State: West Bengal
- Division: Presidency
- District: North 24 Parganas

Government
  - Type: Municipality
  - Body: Panihati Municipality

Languages
  - Official: Bengali, English
- Time zone: UTC+5:30 (IST)
- PIN: 700111
- Telephone code: +91 33
- Vehicle registration: WB
- Lok Sabha constituency: Dum Dum
- Vidhan Sabha constituency: Panihati
- Website: wb.gov.in

Ghola is a neighbourhood in Panihati of North 24 Parganas district in the Indian state of West Bengal. It is a part of the area covered by Kolkata Metropolitan Development Authority (KMDA).

== Geography ==
Cities and towns in the southern portion of Barrackpore subdivision in North 24 Parganas district
M: municipal city/ town, CT: census town,
N: neighbourhood/ administrative location
Owing to space constraints in the small map, the actual locations in a larger map may vary slightly

=== Location ===
Ghola is located at 22°41′47″N 88°24′32″E.

96% of the population of Barrackpore subdivision (partly presented in the map alongside, all places marked on the map are linked in the full screen map) lives in urban areas. In 2011, it had a density of population of 10,967 per km^{2}. The subdivision has 16 municipalities and 24 census towns.

For most of the cities/ towns information regarding density of population is available in the Infobox. Population data is not available for neighbourhoods. It is available for the entire Municipal area and thereafter ward-wise.

=== Police station ===
Ghola police station under Barrackpore Police Commissionerate has jurisdiction over Panihati Municipal areas.

=== Post Office ===
Ghola has a delivery branch post office, with PIN 700111 in the North Presidency Division of North 24 Parganas district in Calcutta region. The only other post office with the same PIN is Ghola Bazar.

=== Kolkata Urban Agglomeration ===
The following Municipalities, Census Towns and other locations in Barrackpore subdivision were part of Kolkata Urban Agglomeration in the 2011 census: Kanchrapara (M), Jetia (CT), Halisahar (M), Balibhara (CT), Naihati (M), Bhatpara (M), Kaugachhi (CT), Garshyamnagar (CT), Garulia (M), Ichhapur Defence Estate (CT), North Barrackpur (M), Barrackpur Cantonment (CB), Barrackpore (M), Jafarpur (CT), Ruiya (CT), Titagarh (M), Khardaha (M), Bandipur (CT), Panihati (M), Muragachha (CT) New Barrackpore (M), Chandpur (CT), Talbandha (CT), Patulia (CT), Kamarhati (M), Baranagar (M), South Dumdum (M), North Dumdum (M), Dum Dum (M), Noapara (CT), Babanpur (CT), Teghari (CT), Nanna (OG), Chakla (OG), Srotribati (OG) and Panpur (OG).

Ghola is a part of Panihati Municipality.

== Transport ==
Ghola is located on the Sodepur-Barasat road.

=== Bus ===
==== Private Bus ====
- 56 Ruiya Purbapara - Howrah Station
- 214 Sajirhat - Babughat
- DN43 Barasat Checkpost - Dakshineswar

==== Bus Route Without Number ====
- Madhyamgram - Howrah Station

=== Train ===
The nearest railway stations are Madhyamgram railway station on the Sealdah-Bangaon line and Sodepur railway station on the Sealdah-Ranaghat line.

== Education ==
Thirthabharari Shiksha mandir ward no 31.Ghola High School in Ward No. 28 of Panihati Municipality is a Bengali-medium boys only higher secondary school. It was established in 1957. adarsha prathamik vidyalaya ward no-29 .

Ghola Girls High School in Ward No. 28 of Panihati Municipality is a Bengali-medium girls only higher secondary school. It was established in 1959.
