= Agarpara railway station =

Railway station in West Bengal, India

Agarpara

General information
- Location: Agarpara, North 24 Parganas district, West Bengal; India
- Coordinates: 22°41′00″N 88°23′07″E
- Elevation: 10 metres (33 ft)
- System: Kolkata Suburban Railway
- Owner: Indian Railways
- Operator: Eastern Railway
- Line: Sealdah–Ranaghat line of Kolkata Suburban Railway
- Platforms: 4
- Tracks: 4

Construction
- Structure type: Standard (on ground station)
- Parking: Railway authorized near South Station road
- Cycle facilities: Available
- Accessible: For platform no. 1 only

Other information
- Status: Active
- Station code: AGP
- Division(s): Sealdah

History
- Opened: 1862; 164 years ago
- Electrified: 1963–1965; 61 years ago
- Former names: Eastern Bengal Railway

Services
Preceding station	Kolkata Suburban Railway	Following station
Belgharia towards Sealdah	Eastern Line Main line	Sodpur towards Ranaghat Junction
Route map
Location
- Location within West Bengal Location within India

Agarpara railway station is a Kolkata Suburban Railway station and one of the oldest active railway station in the town of Agarpara. This railway station situates between the Belgharia railway station and Sodpur railway station. It serves the local areas of Agarpara in North 24 Parganas district, West Bengal, India.

It belongs to Sealdah Railway Division of Eastern Railway Zone of Indian Railways. This station provides rail services across its surrounding area. Trains approach for Ranaghat, Kalyani Simanta, Gede, Sealdah and Majerhat run through this station. Kolkata Suburban Railway serves local railway passenger trains at this station daily.

== History ==
The Eastern Bengal Railway main line from Sealdah to Ranaghat was opened in 1862 and was further extended to Kushtia in present-day Bangladesh within two months. Eastern Bengal Railway used to work only on the eastern side of the Hooghly River.

== Railway ==
Agarpara railway station is located on the Sealdah Ranaghat railway line that stretches between Kolkata district, North 24 Parganas district and Nadia district. This railway currently has 4 tracks from Sealdah to Naihati Junction and 2 tracks from Naihati Junction to Ranaghat Junction.

The track at this station, belonging to the Sealdah - Ranaghat railway, is classified as C-class track, is not a speed classification. But it is used for suburban rail services in metropolitan areas.

== Station complex ==
The railway platform is almost fully sheltered. At the station, the building for station management and the station master's building are located adjacent to the platform no.1. Passengers are issued tickets from that platform by station ticket officers for train travel. The station has seating, toilet, drinking water facilities for passenger convenience.

Water is available in all the 4 platforms, while toilets are available in 2 platforms only. There are three approach roads to the station. The north station road directly goes to platform no. 1. The South and East station roads meet the respective subway gates to the station.

There is a subway and foot over-bridge for crossing. Parking facility is also available for motorcycles and bicycles at the station.

== Electrification ==
Most local passenger trains are electric trains and run on the tracks of Agarpara railway station. Electrification of this railway through the Sealdah–Ranaghat line was completed in 1963–1965.

== Securities ==
All the responsibilities of station management are given to the head of the station "Station Master". Apart from this, temporary mobile GRP personnel are employed for the security of the station and its premises. Station's adjoining areas security is provided by the local police administration.

== See also ==
- Sodpur railway station
- Belgharia railway station
- Dum Dum Junction railway station
- Sealdah railway station
- Howrah railway station, the oldest and the busiest railway station of India.
