= Guru Nanak Institute of Dental Sciences and Research =

Dental college in Panihati, West Bengal, India

Coordinates: 22°41′41.92″N 88°22′30.16″E

Guru Nanak Institute of Dental Science and Research
- Type: Private Dental College & Hospital
- Established: 2003
- Founder: Sardar Jodh Singh
- Accreditation: NAAC 'A'
- Academic affiliations: DCI; WBUHS
- Principal: Dr. J. Bhattacharyya
- Students: Totals: BDS – 100 per Year (500 in total); MDS – 35
- Location: Panihati, Kolkata, West Bengal, 700114, India
- Campus: 5.2 acres (2.1 ha); Urban
- Website: gnidsr.ac.in

Guru Nanak Institute of Dental Sciences and Research (GNIDSR) is a private dental college located in Panihati, Kolkata, in the Indian state of West Bengal. It is affiliated with the West Bengal University of Health Sciences and is recognised by Dental Council of India. It teaches Bachelor of Dental Science (BDS) and Master of Dental Science (MDS) courses.

== Rankings ==
Dental rankings

Dental – India
- NIRF (2022): 40

The National Institutional Ranking Framework (NIRF) ranked Guru nanak Institute of Dental Sciences & Research 40th in Dental ranking in India.
