= Narula Institute of Technology =

Engineering college in West Bengal, India

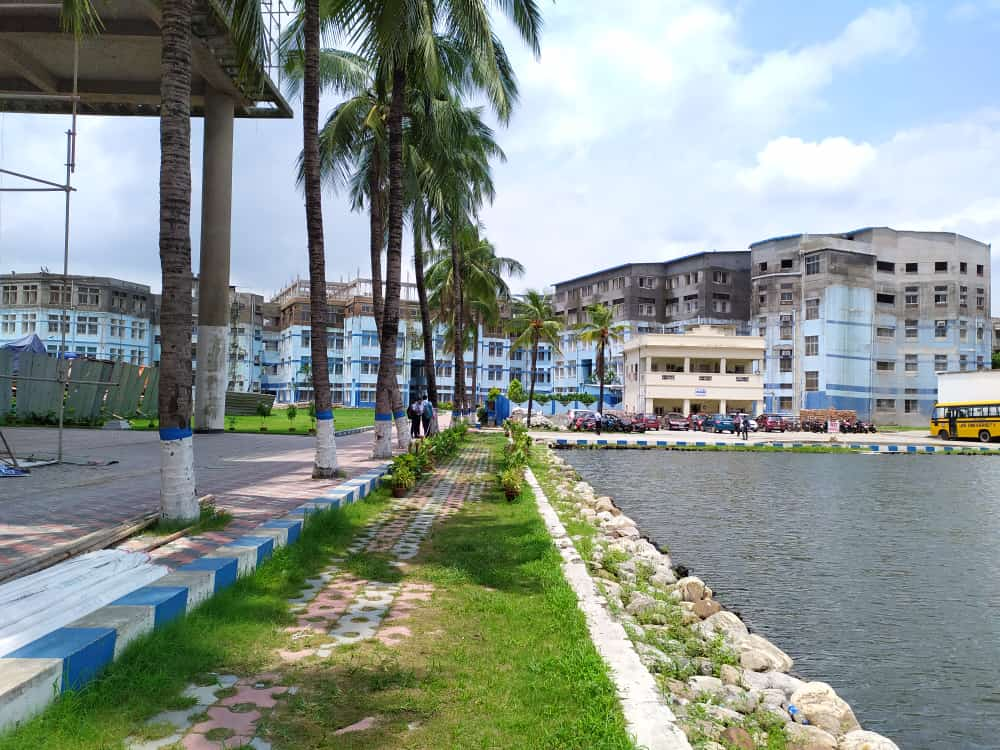
- Main academic building of college
- Type: Engineering college
- Established: 2001; 25 years ago
- Affiliations: MAKAUT; AICTE; NAAC; NBA
- Principal: Prof.(Dr.) Subhram Das
- Director: Sardar Simarpreet Singh
- Students: B.Tech: 1320 (approx), M.Tech: 90 (approx), Dip.Eng.: 180 (approx)
- Location: 81, Nilgunj Road, Agarpara, West Bengal, 700109, India; 22.6767°N 88.3791°E
- Campus: Urban
- Colours: Blue, Black
- Website: www.nit.ac.in

- Location within Kolkata Location within West Bengal Location within India

Narula Institute of Technology (better known as NiT) is an autonomous private engineering college in West Bengal, India, situated in Agarpara. The college is affiliated with the Maulana Abul Kalam Azad University of Technology (MAKAUT). It is one of seven colleges under the JIS Group, a Sikh minority group and a member of Association of Minority Professional Academic Institutes (AMPAI).

== Admission ==
Admission for BTech. courses is held through WBJEE and JEE Main. Admission for MTech courses is held through GATE and PGET.

== Programs ==
Engineering

- BTech Civil Engineering
- BTech Computer science and engineering
- BTech Electrical Engineering
- BTech Electronics and Communication Engineering
- BTech Electronics and Instrumentation Engineering
- BTech Information Technology
- BTech Mechanical Engineering
- BTech Computer Science and Technology
- MTech Computer science and engineering
- MTech Electronics and Communications engineering
- MTech Power Systems
- MTech Structural Engineering
- Diploma in Civil Engineering
- Diploma in Mechanical Engineering
- Diploma in Electrical Engineering
- Diploma in Electronics and Communication Engineering
- Diploma in Electronics and Telecommunication Engineering

Computer Application

- BCA
- MCA

Business Administration

- BBA
- MBA

== Affiliations ==
The college is affiliated with the Maulana Abul Kalam Azad University of Technology (MAKAUT). It is approved by the All India Council for Technical Education (AICTE) and accredited by the National Assessment and Accreditation Council (NAAC) with a "B" grade until the end of 2019, and maximum courses are National Board of Accreditation (NBA) accredited. It got grade "A" by NAAC in 2022 with the CGPA of 3.22 on 4 point scale.

== Rankings ==
University and college rankings

Engineering – India
- NIRF (2024): 201-300

The National Institutional Ranking Framework (NIRF) ranked Narula Institute of Technology in 201-300 band among engineering colleges in India in 2024.

== Placement and training ==
The college has its own P&T cell with dedicated staff. The majority of the placement in Infosys, TCS Capgemini and many Mass Recruiter Companies.

== See also ==
- List of institutions of higher education in West Bengal
- Education in India
- Education in West Bengal
- List of colleges in West Bengal
- Universities and colleges of West Bengal
