= Khardaha railway station =

Railway station in West Bengal, India

Khardaha
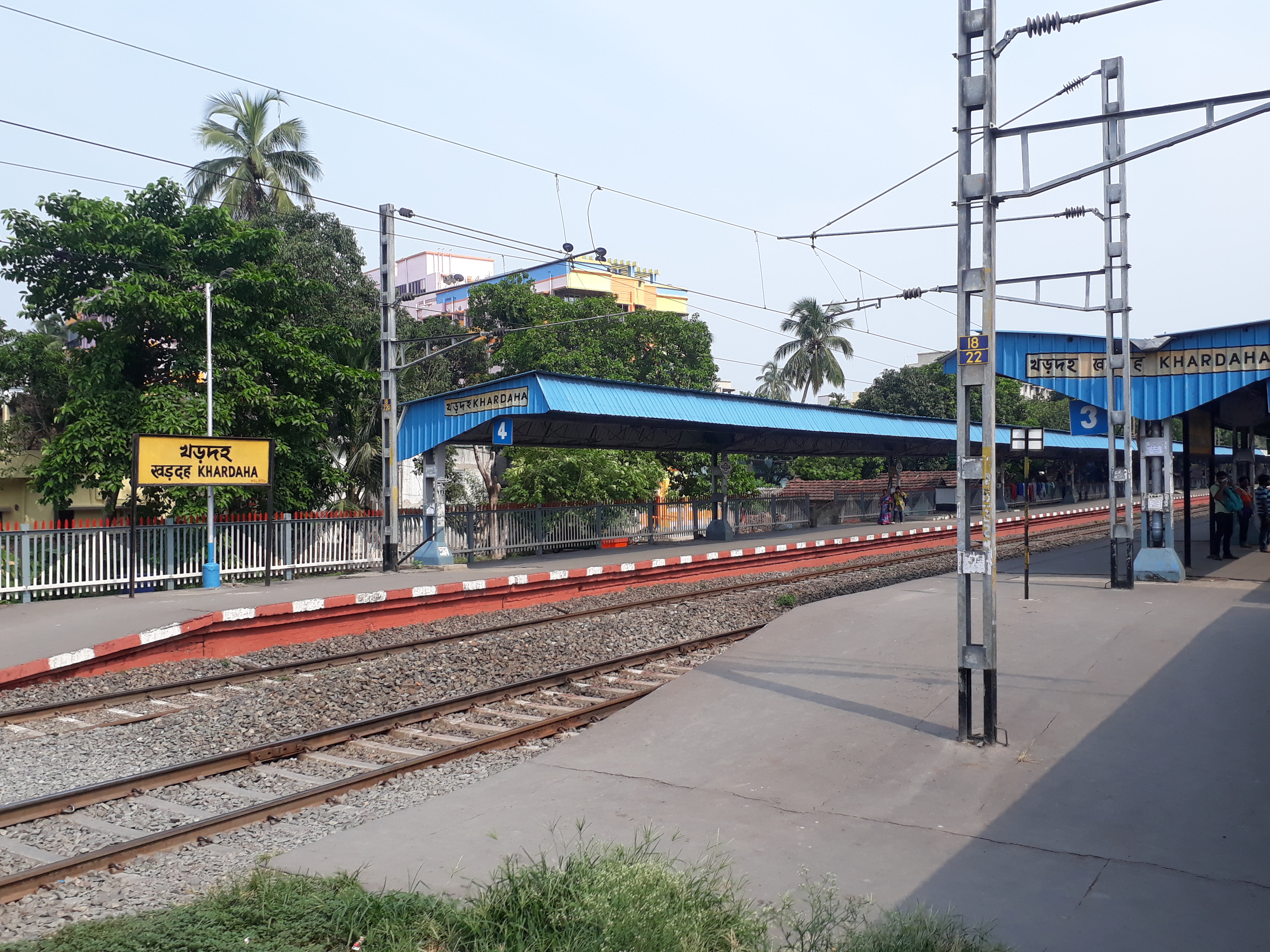
- Khardaha railway station

General information
- Location: Khardaha, North 24 Parganas district, West Bengal; India
- Coordinates: 22°43′30″N 88°22′40″E
- Elevation: 10 metres (33 ft)
- System: Kolkata Suburban Railway station
- Owner: Indian Railways
- Operator: Eastern Railway
- Line: Sealdah–Ranaghat line of Kolkata Suburban Railway
- Platforms: 4
- Tracks: 4

Construction
- Structure type: At grade
- Parking: Not available
- Cycle facilities: Not available

Other information
- Status: Functional
- Station code: KDH
- Zone(s): Eastern Railway
- Division(s): Sealdah

History
- Opened: 1862; 164 years ago
- Electrified: 1963–1965; 61 years ago

Services
Preceding station	Kolkata Suburban Railway	Following station
Sodpur towards Sealdah	Eastern Line Main line	Titagarh towards Ranaghat Junction
Route map
Location
- Location within West Bengal Location within India

Khardaha railway station is a Kolkata Suburban Railway station in the city of Khardaha. It serves the local areas of Khardaha and as well as Rahara in the Kolkata Metropolitan Area of North 24 Parganas district, West Bengal, India. This railway station is well connected towards south with Sealdah (Station code: SDAH), which is one of India's major railway terminal serving the city of Kolkata. Towards north, it is well connected with some Big Railway Junctions like Barrackpore, Naihati, Bandel and Barddhaman. This station is under jurisdiction of Eastern Railway zone of Indian Railways. Khardaha Railway Station comes under Seladah-Ranaghat Main line. Only EMU train service is available from here at present.

== History ==
The Sealdah–Kusthia line of the Eastern Bengal Railway was opened to railway traffic in the year 1862. Eastern Bengal Railway used to work only on the eastern side of the Hooghly River.

== Station complex ==
The platform is not very well sheltered. It has many facilities including water and sanitation. It is well connected to the BT Road. But there is no proper approach road to this station.

== Electrification ==
The Sealdah–Ranaghat sector was electrified in 1963–65.
