= Bengal Chemicals and Pharmaceuticals =

Indian central public sector undertaking

Bengal Chemicals & Pharmaceuticals Ltd.

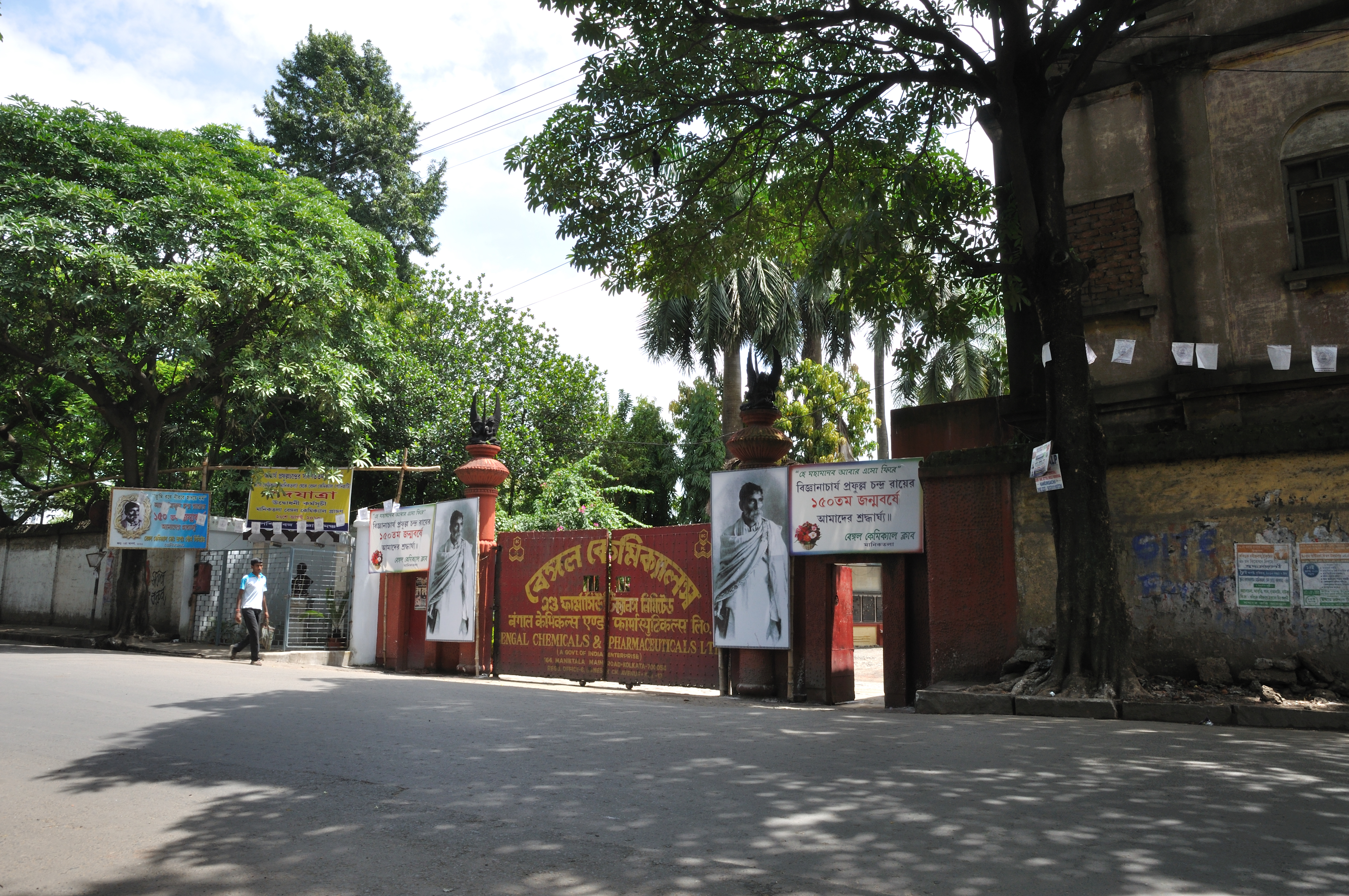
- Entrance to BCPL's factory at Maniktala, Kolkata
- Formerly: Bengal Chemical & Pharmaceutical Works Ltd. (BCPW)
- Type: Central Public Sector Undertaking
- Industry: Chemical, Pharmaceutical
- Predecessor: Bengal Chemical Works (1892–1901)
- Founded: 12 April 1901; 125 years ago in Calcutta, Bengal Presidency, British India (now Kolkata, West Bengal, India)
- Founder: Acharya Prafulla Chandra Ray
- Headquarters: 6 Ganesh Chandra Avenue, Kolkata, West Bengal, India
- Key people: P M Chandraiah (MD)
- Revenue: ▲₹100.5 crore (2018-19)
- Net income: ▲₹25.26 crore (2018-19)
- Owner: Ministry of Chemicals and Fertilizers, Government of India
- Number of employees: ▼195 (2018-19)
- Website: bengalchemicals.co.in

Bengal Chemicals & Pharmaceuticals Ltd. (BCPL), formerly Bengal Chemical & Pharmaceutical Works Ltd. (BCPW), is an Indian central public sector undertaking under the ownership of Ministry of Chemicals and Fertilizers, Government of India. lt manufactures industrial chemicals, pharmaceuticals like antibiotic injectables, tablets, and capsules; and household products.

Established in Kolkata, West Bengal in 1901 by Prafulla Chandra Ray, it is India's first government owned-pharmaceutical-manufacturer. While initially successful, it started making losses in the mid-1950s. The management of the company was taken over by the Union government on 15 December 1977, and the company was nationalised on 15 December 1980. Following decades of losses, BCPL returned to profitability in financial year 2016–17.

== History ==
=== Beginnings ===
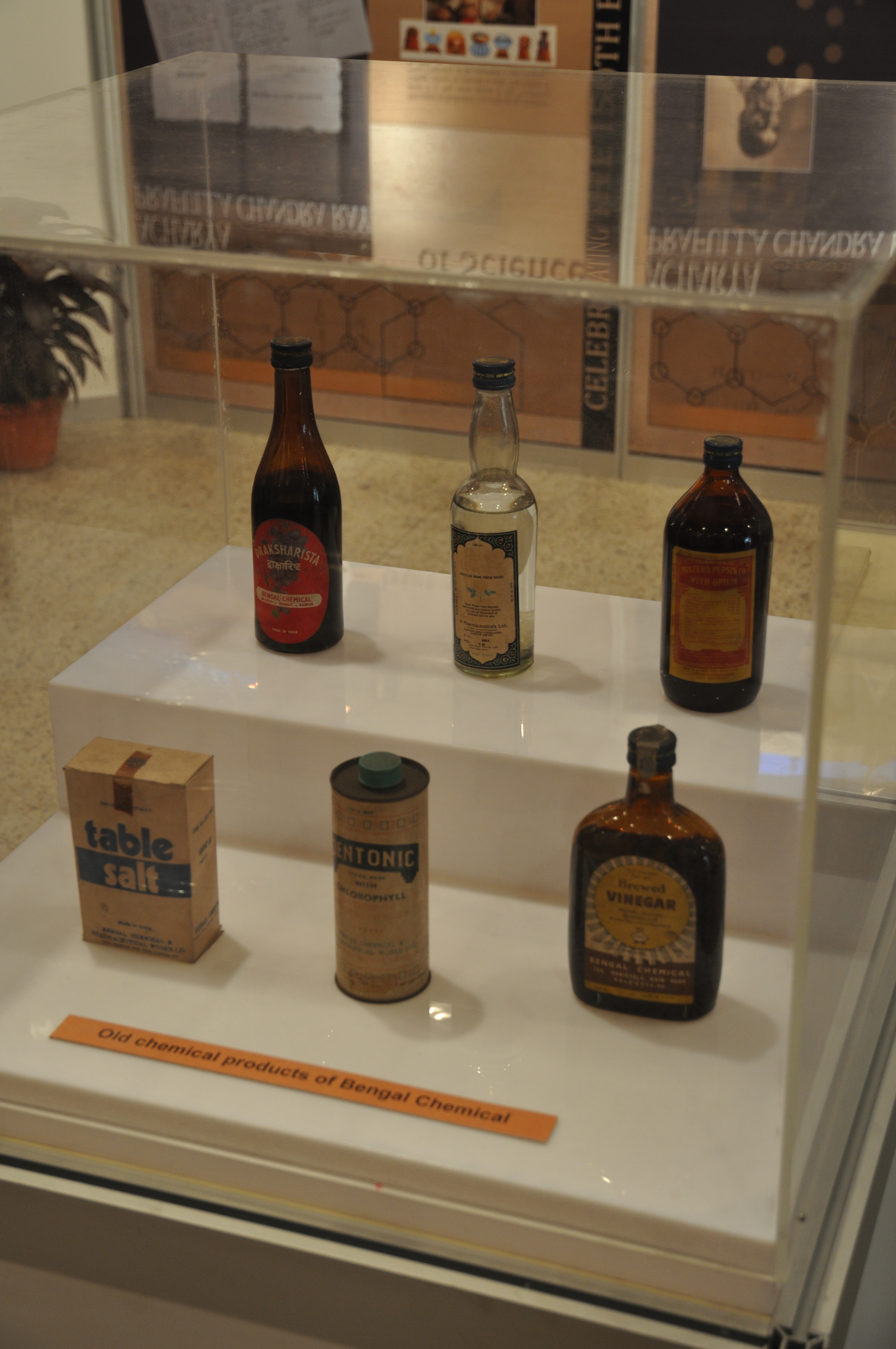
Old products of Bengal Chemical

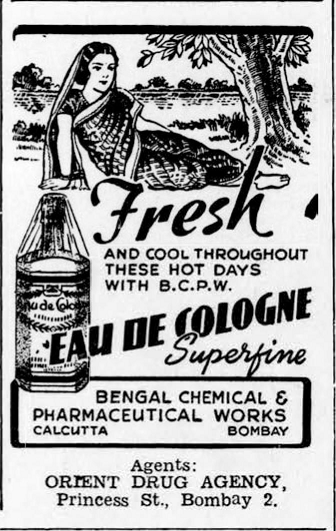
Eau De Cologne advertisement, manufactured by Bengal Chemical Pharmaceutical Works, 1943

In 1892, Prafulla Chandra Ray rented house at 91 Upper Circular Road, Kolkata and founded Bengal Chemical Works with a capital of ₹700 (equivalent to ₹270,000 or US$2,800 in 2023). Ray founded the company as an individual initiative with the intention with fostering a spirit of entrepreneurship among the Bengali youth, and provide an alternative to jobs from the colonial British government. The company presented its herbal products at the 1893 session of the Indian Medical Congress in Kolkata.

The reputation of the company grew, and Ray added additional funds of ₹2 lakh (equivalent to ₹7.2 crore or US$750,000 in 2023) to the company to increase the scale of production. The business was converted into a Limited Company, and on 12 April 1901 the company was renamed Bengal Chemical and Pharmaceutical Works Ltd. (BCPW), retaining the same premises at 91 Upper Circular Road, Calcutta. In 1908, John Cumming wrote in the "Review of the Industrial Position and Prospects in Bengal" that the "enterprise shows signs of resourcefulness and business capacity, which should be an object lesson to capitalists of this province".

From a beginning with one factory in Kolkata's Maniktala in 1905, three more factories were established – one in Panihati in 1920, one in Mumbai in 1938, and one in Kanpur in 1949, with its registered office at 6 Ganesh Chandra Avenue, Kolkata.

=== Struggles and nationalisation ===
The company began to struggle after Roy died in 1944, and started making losses in the mid-1950s. The management of the company was taken over by the Union government on 15 December 1977, followed by nationalisation on 15 December 1980. The new public sector undertaking was named Bengal Chemicals & Pharmaceuticals Ltd. (BCPL), and was launched on 27 March 1981. As its losses continued, BCPL was referred to the Board for Industrial and Financial Reconstruction in 1992.

=== Return to profitability ===
After incurring losses for decades, the company managed to return to profitability in the financial year 2016–17, and continued to report profits for 2 subsequent fiscals.

=== Hydroxychloroquine production during COVID-19 pandemic ===
In view of the Indian Council of Medical Research recommending hydroxychloroquine for prophylaxis against COVID-19, BCPL received clearance to start manufacturing the drug.

== Products ==
- Division I (Industrial Chemicals) - alum, bleaching powder
- Division II (Pharmaceuticals) - generic drugs, such as analgesics, antipyretics, antimicrobials (including antifungals, antibiotics and anti-tubercular drugs) and antiseptics; and branded drugs like Ray Cal (calcium with vitamin D_{3} and vitamin B_{12}) and Hospitol (chloroxylenol)
- Division III (Home Products) - toiletries and household disinfectants

== Privatization ==
On the 9th of February 2021, the Government of India announced the privatization of Bengal Chemicals and Fertilizers.
