= Guru Nanak Institute of Technology =

College in West Bengal, India

Coordinates: 22.6951444°N 88.3766361°E

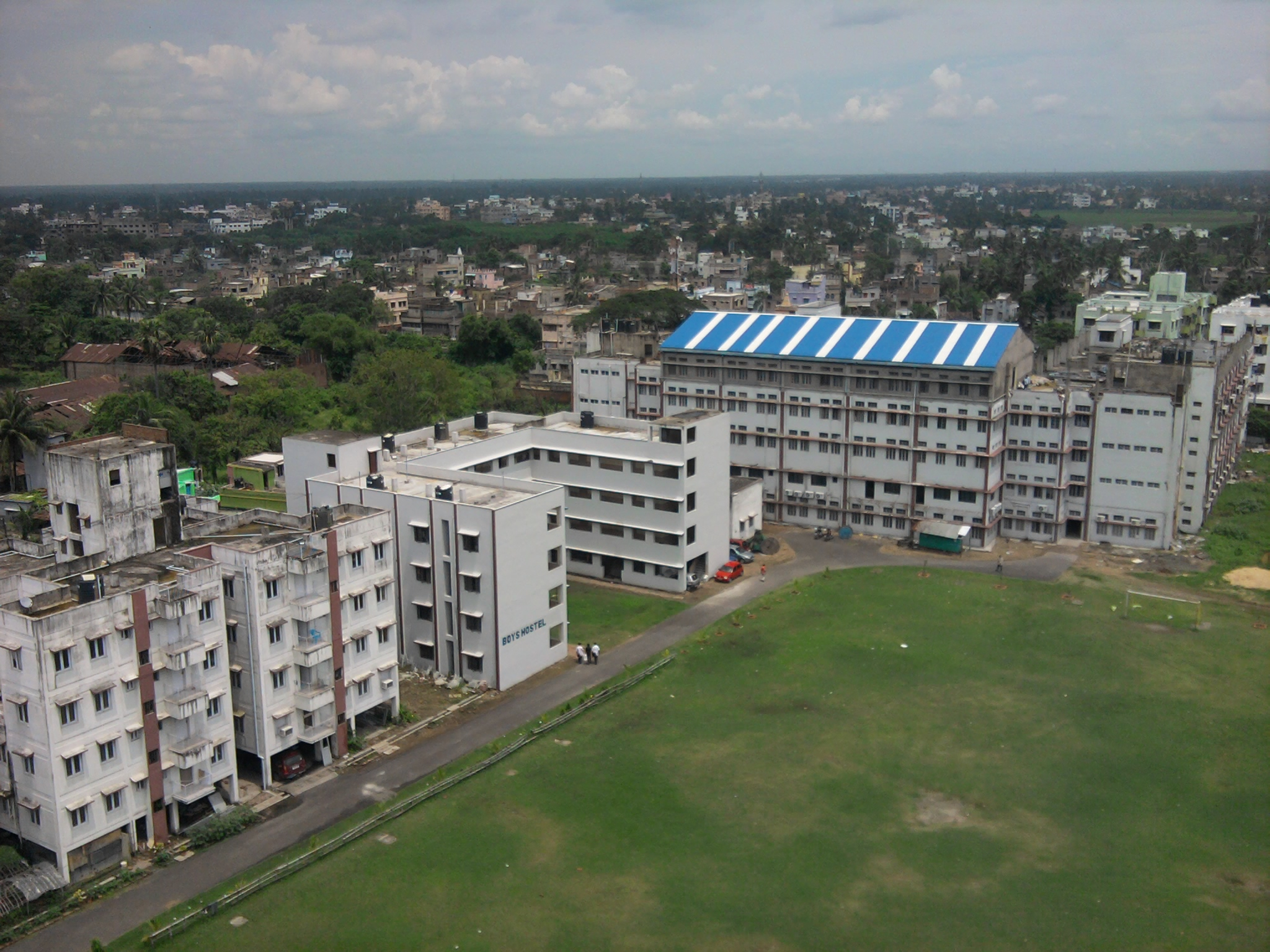
- Type: Private
- Established: 2003
- Affiliations: Maulana Abul Kalam Azad University of Technology, West Bengal
- Principal: Swarup Kumar Mitra
- Faculty: 75
- Administrative staff: 20
- Students: 2000 approx.
- Undergraduates: 1880 approx.
- Postgraduates: 120
- Location: Sodepur, Kolkata, West Bengal, India
- Campus: Urban
- Approvals: AICTE; NAAC; NBA
- Website: Guru Nanak Institute of Technology

Guru Nanak Institute of Technology (GNIT) is a premium engineering institution established by the JIS Group in 2003, located in Panihati, West Bengal, India. The college is an AICTE-approved institution and is affiliated to Maulana Abul Kalam Azad University of Technology, West Bengal. The college in accredited by NAAC (NAAC A+)with overall institutional CGPA of 2.54

== Smart India Hackathon ==
Guru Nanak Institute of Technology is a Nodal Centre for the SMART INDIA HACKATHON organized by Govt. of India since 2017.

== See also ==
- List of institutions of higher education in West Bengal
