= Sodpur railway station =

Railway Station in West Bengal, India

Sodpur
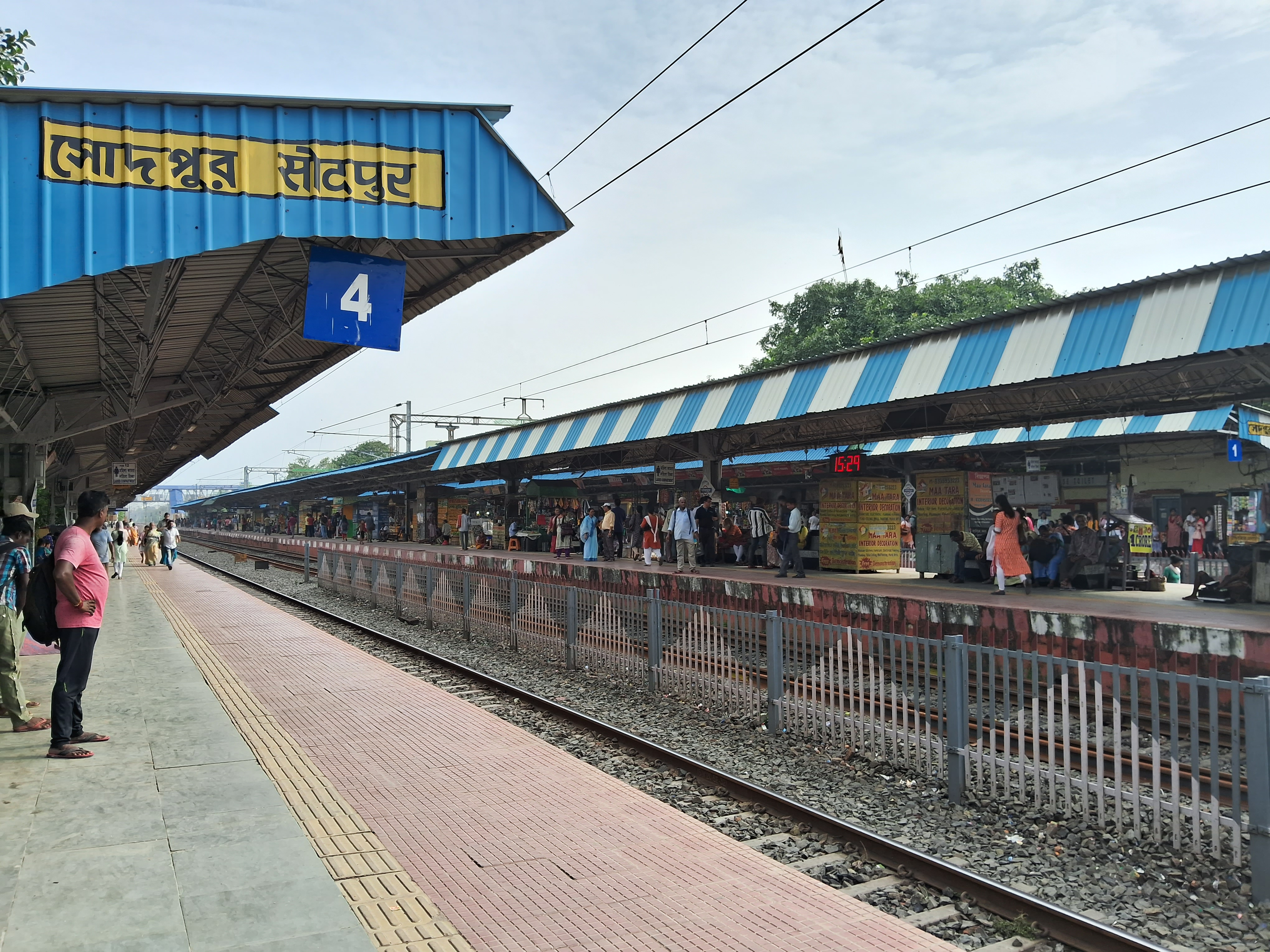
- Sodpur railway station

General information
- Location: Sodepur, North 24 Parganas district, West Bengal; India
- Coordinates: 22°41′59″N 88°22′56″E
- Elevation: 7 metres (23 ft)
- System: Kolkata Suburban Railway station
- Owner: Indian Railways
- Operator: Eastern Railway
- Line: Sealdah–Ranaghat line of Kolkata Suburban Railway
- Platforms: 4
- Tracks: 4

Construction
- Structure type: At grade
- Parking: Available near station
- Cycle facilities: Available near station

Other information
- Status: Functional
- Station code: SEP
- Zone(s): Eastern Railway
- Division(s): Sealdah

History
- Opened: 1862; 164 years ago
- Electrified: 1963–1965; 61 years ago

Services
Preceding station	Kolkata Suburban Railway	Following station
Agarpara towards Sealdah	Eastern Line Main line	Khardaha towards Ranaghat Junction
Route map
Location
- Location within West Bengal Location within India

Sodpur railway station is a Kolkata Suburban Railway station in the town of Sodepur. It serves the local areas of Sodepur in North 24 Parganas district, West Bengal, India.

== History ==
The Sealdah–Kusthia line of the Eastern Bengal Railway was opened to railway traffic in the year 1862. Eastern Bengal Railway used to work only on the eastern side of the Hooghly River.

== Station complex ==
The platform is very well sheltered. It has many facilities including water and sanitation. It is well connected to the BT Road. The station has underground subways as well as railway overbridge connecting all the platforms(PF1 to PF4) as well as the Sodepur Market and Auto stand .

== Electrification ==
The Sealdah–Ranaghat sector was electrified in 1963–65.
