= Hasnabad (community development block) =

- Community development block
- Interactive map of Hasnabad
- Coordinates: 22.57°N 88.92°E
- Country: India
- State: West Bengal
- District: North 24 Parganas

Government
  - Type: Representative democracy

Area
  - Total: 153.07 km^{2} (59.10 sq mi)
- Elevation: 7 m (23 ft)

Population (2011)
  - Total: 203,262
  - Density: 1,327.9/km^{2} (3,439.3/sq mi)

Languages
  - Official: Bengali, English

Literacy (2011)
  - Total literates: 127,403 (71.47%)
- Time zone: UTC+5:30 (IST)
- PIN: 743426 (Hasnabad)
- Telephone/STD code: 03217
- ISO 3166 code: IN-WB
- Vehicle registration: WB-23, WB-24, WB-25, WB-26
- Lok Sabha constituency: Basirhat
- Vidhan Sabha constituency: Basirhat Uttar, Hingalganj
- Website: north24parganas.nic.in

Hasnabad is a community development block that serves as an administrative division in the Basirhat subdivision of North 24 Parganas district, located in the Indian state of West Bengal.

== Geography ==
Hasnabad is located at 22°34′N 88°55′E.

Hasnabad CD Block is bounded by Basirhat I CD Block in the north, Debhata Upazila in Satkhira District of Bangladesh in the east, Hingalganj CD Block in the south and Sandeshkhali I and Minakhan CD Blocks in the west.

Hasnabad CD Block is part of the Ichhamati-Raimangal Plain, one of the three physiographic regions in the district located in the lower Ganges Delta. It contains soil of mature black or brownish loam to recent alluvium. The Ichhamati flows through the eastern part of the district.

Hasnabad CD Block has an area of 153.07 km^{2}. It has 1 panchayat samity, 9 gram panchayats, 127 gram sansads (village councils), 74 mouzas and 73 inhabited villages. Hasnabad police station serves this block and Chaltabaria a sub police station has been serves this block. Headquarters of this CD Block is at Hasnabad.

Gram panchayats of Hasnabad block/ panchayat samiti are: Amlani, Bhabanipur I, Hasnabad, Patlikhanpur, Barunhat Rameswarpur, Bhabanipur II, Makhalgachha, Bhebia and Murarisha.

=== Sundarbans ===
The Sundarbans is a flat lowland susceptible to the tidal waves along the 260 km shoreline of the Bay of Bengal. The total expanse of Sundarbans is about 2.05 million hectares (8,000 square miles). Of this, only 0.42 million hectares (1,629 square miles or 10,43,000 acres) are under the reserve forests including about 0.19 million hectares covered by creeks and channels. The area is prone to natural calamities such as cyclones, thunderstorms with occasional hail and floods. There are more than 63,400 km of embankments but the floods caused by high tidal bores, often wash away much of the embankments, already weakened and broken by earlier cyclonic storms.

In May 2009, the district was hit by high speed cyclone named Aila and subsequent rainfall which continued for two days. This created a disaster in 20 out of 22 blocks of the district. 10 out of 27 municipalities of the district were also severely affected.

Six CD Blocks of North 24 Parganas are included in the Sundabans area – Hingalganj, Hasnabad, Sandeskhali I and II, Minakhan and Haora. The south-eastern part of the district gradually merges into the Sunderbans.

== Demographics ==
=== Population ===
As per 2011 Census of India Hasnabad CD Block had a total population of 203,262, of which 197,014 were rural and 6,248 were urban. There were 104,019 (51%) males and 99,243 (49%) females. Population below 6 years was 25,007. Scheduled Castes numbered 51,295 (25.24%) and Scheduled Tribes numbered 7,492 (3.69%).

As per 2001 census, Hasnabad block has a total population of 177,470 out of which 91,122 were males and 86,348 were females.

There is only one census town in Hasnabad CD Block (2011 census figure in brackets): Sadigachhi (6,248).

Large villages in Hasnabad CD Block are (2011 census figures in brackets): Murarisaha (5,652), Rajapura (4,158), Dakshin Bhebia (7,102), Kharampur (5,714), Chandpur (4,008), Haripur (4,107), Ghuni (4,281), Chak Patli (7,128), Shulkaniabad (5,414), Bhurkunda (5,617), Ghoshalati (6,892), Ichhapur (7,872) and Barunhat (16,635).

North 24 Parganas district is densely populated, mainly because of the influx of refugees from East Pakistan (later Bangladesh). With a density of population of 2,182 per km^{2} in 1971, it was 3rd in terms of density per km^{2} in West Bengal after Kolkata and Howrah, and 20th in India. According to the District Human Development Report: North 24 Parganas, "High density is also explained partly by the rapid growth of urbanization in the district. In 1991, the percentage of urban population in the district has been 51.23."

Decadal Population Growth Rate (%)

View source data.

The decadal growth of population in Hasnabad CD Block in 2001-2011 was 14.50%. The decadal growth of population in Hasnabad CD Block in 1991-2001 was 17.47%.

The decadal growth rate of population in North 24 Parganas district was as follows: 47.9% in 1951–61, 34.5% in 1961–71, 31.4% in 1971–81, 31.7% in 1981–91, 22.7% in 1991-2001 and 12.0% in 2001–11. The decadal growth rate for West Bengal in 2001-11 was 13.93%. The decadal growth rate for West Bengal was 17.84% in 1991–2001, 24.73% in 1981-1991 and 23.17% in 1971–1981.

The decadal growth rate of population in neighbouring Satkhira District in Bangladesh was 6.50% for the decade 2001–2011, down from 16.75% in the decade 1991-2001 and 17.90% in the decade 1981–1991.

Only a small portion of the border with Bangladesh has been fenced and it is popularly referred to as a porous border. It is freely used by Bangladeshi infiltrators, terrorists, smugglers, criminals. et al.

See also - Hasnabad for information on floating border outposts.

=== Literacy ===
As per the 2011 census, the total number of literates in Hasnabad CD Block was 127,403 (71.47% of the population over 6 years) out of which males numbered 69,699 (76.34% of the male population over 6 years) and females numbered 57,704 (66.36% of the female population over 6 years). The gender disparity (the difference between female and male literacy rates) was 9.98%.

See also – List of West Bengal districts ranked by literacy rate

Literacy in CD blocks of
North 24 Parganas district
Barasat Sadar subdivision
Amdanga – 80.69%
Deganga – 79.65%
Barasat I – 81.50%
Barasat II – 77.71%
Habra I – 83.15%
Habra II – 81.05%
Rajarhat – 83.13%
Basirhat subdivision
Baduria – 78.75%
Basirhat I – 72.10%
Basirhat II – 78.30%
Haroa – 73.13%
Hasnabad – 71.47%
Hingalganj – 76.85%
Minakhan – 71.33%
Sandeshkhali I – 71.08%
Sandeshkhali II – 70.96%
Swarupnagar – 77.57%
Bangaon subdivision
Bagdah – 75.30%
Bangaon – 79.71%
Gaighata – 82.32%
Barrackpore subdivision
Barrackpore I – 85.91%
Barrackpore II – 84.53%
Source: 2011 Census: CD Block Wise
Primary Census Abstract Data

=== Language and religion ===
Religion in Hasnabad CD block (2011)
| Islam | 56.51% |
| Hinduism | 43.35% |
| Other or not stated | 0.14% |

In the 2011 census Muslims numbered 114,869 and formed 56.51% of the population in Hasnabad CD Block. Hindus numbered 88,112 and formed 43.35% of the population. Others numbered 281 and formed 0.14% of the population.

In 1981 Hindus numbered 83,096 and formed 61.76% of the population and Muslims numbered 51,496 and formed 38.24% of the population. In 1991 Muslims numbered 83,328 and formed 55.14% of the population and Hindus numbered 67,787 and formed 44.86% of the population in Hasnabad CD Block. (In 1981 and 1991 census was conducted as per jurisdiction of the police station). In 2001 in Hasnabad CD block Muslims were 96,710 (54.48%) and Hindus 80,659 (45.44%).

Bengali is the predominant language, spoken by 99.70% of the population.

== Rural Poverty ==
28.69% of households in Hasnabad CD Block lived below poverty line in 2001, against an average of 29.28% in North 24 Parganas district.

=== Livelihood ===
Livelihood
in Hasnabad CD Block
1. Cultivators (11.4%)
2. Agricultural labourers (27.8%)
3. Household industries (10.9%)
4. Other Workers (49.8%)

In Hasnabad CD Block in 2011, amongst the class of total workers, cultivators numbered 9,171 and formed 11.45% of the total workers, agricultural labourers numbered 22,229 and formed 27.76%, household industry workers numbered 8,770 and formed 10.95% and other workers numbered 39,907 and formed 49.84%. Total workers numbered 80,077 and formed 39.40% of the total population, and non-workers numbered 123,185 and formed 69.60% of the population.

In more than 30 percent of the villages in North 24 Parganas, agriculture or household industry is no longer the major source of livelihood for the main workers there. The CD Blocks in the district can be classified as belonging to three categories: border areas, Sundarbans area and other rural areas. The percentage of other workers in the other rural areas category is considerably higher than those in the border areas and Sundarbans area.

Note: In the census records a person is considered a cultivator, if the person is engaged in cultivation/ supervision of land owned by self/government/institution. When a person who works on another person's land for wages in cash or kind or share, is regarded as an agricultural labourer. Household industry is defined as an industry conducted by one or more members of the family within the household or village, and one that does not qualify for registration as a factory under the Factories Act. Other workers are persons engaged in some economic activity other than cultivators, agricultural labourers and household workers. It includes factory, mining, plantation, transport and office workers, those engaged in business and commerce, teachers, entertainment artistes and so on.

=== Infrastructure ===
There are 73 inhabited villages in Hasnabad CD Block. 100% villages have power supply and drinking water supply. 16 villages (21.92%) have post offices. 58 villages (79.45%) have telephones (including landlines, public call offices and mobile phones). 34 villages (46.48%) have a pucca approach road and 22 villages (30.14%) have transport communication (includes bus service, rail facility and navigable waterways). 8 villages (10.96%) have agricultural credit societies and 3 villages (4.11% ) have banks.

=== Agriculture ===
The North 24 Parganas district Human Development Report opines that in spite of agricultural productivity in North 24 Parganas district being rather impressive 81.84% of rural population suffered from shortage of food. With a high urbanisation of 54.3% in 2001, the land use pattern in the district is changing quite fast and the area under cultivation is declining. However, agriculture is still the major source of livelihood in the rural areas of the district.

From 1977 on wards major land reforms took place in West Bengal. Land in excess of land ceiling was acquired and distributed amongst the peasants. Following land reforms land ownership pattern has undergone transformation. In 2010–11, persons engaged in agriculture in Hasnabad CD Block could be classified as follows: bargadars 11,632 (20.87%), patta (document) holders 10,432 (18.72%), small farmers (possessing land between 1 and 2 hectares) 1,480 (2.66%), marginal farmers (possessing land up to 1 hectare) 16,345 (29.32%) and agricultural labourers 15,849 (28.43%).

Hasnabad CD Block had 90 fertiliser depots, no seed store and no fair price shop in 2010–11.

In 2010–11, Hasnabad CD Block produced 23,983 tonnes of Aman paddy, the main winter crop from 10,128 hectares, 6,169 tonnes of Boro paddy (spring crop) from 1,795 hectares, 3 tonnes of Aus paddy (summer crop) from 1 hectare, 40 tonnes of wheat from 15 hectares, 18,739 tonnes of jute from 1,169 hectares and 12,542 tonnes of potatoes from 419 hectares. It also produced pulses and oilseeds.

There were no irrigation facilities in Hasnabad CD Block in 2010–11.

=== Pisciculture ===
In 2010–11, the net area under effective pisciculture in Hasnabad CD Block was 2,257 hectares. 20,439 persons were engaged in the profession. Approximate annual production was 67,710 quintals.

=== Banking ===
In 2010–11, Hasnabad CD Block had offices of 6 commercial banks and 3 gramin banks.

== Transport ==
In 2010–11, Hasnabad CD Block had 3 ferry services and 5 originating/ terminating bus routes.

SH 2 passes through this CD Block.

Hasnabad is 75 km from Sealdah and the electrified train line is via Barasat. It is part of the Kolkata Suburban Railway. The Barasat – Hasnabad light railway has been converted to a broad gauge section.

Hasnabad railway station is the terminus of the Barasat-Hasnabad line. There are some nearby stations also: Taki Road railway station, Nimdanri railway station and Madhyampur railway station.

== Education ==
In 2010–11, Hasnabad CD Block had 125 primary schools with 13,154 students, 1 middle school with 172 students, 12 high schools with 8,516 students and 9 higher secondary schools with 8,312 students. Hasnabad CD Block had 388 institutions for special and non-formal education with 18,446 students.

As per the 2011 census, in Hasnabad CD Block, amongst the 73 inhabited villages, 3 villages did not have a school, 37 villages had more than 1 primary school, 20 villages had at least 1 primary and 1 middle school and 17 villages had at least 1 middle and 1 secondary school.

== Healthcare ==
In 2011, Hasnabad CD Block had 1 rural hospital and 3 primary health centres, with total 18 beds and 9 doctors (excluding private bodies). It had 33 family welfare subcentres. 13,883 patients were treated in the hospitals, health centres and subcentres of the CD Block.

Taki Rural Hospital at Taki with 50 beds functions as the main medical facility in Hasnabad CD Block. There are primary health centres at Bhurkundu (Bhawanipur PHC with 10 beds), Bhebia (Gholas PHC with 6 beds) and Bara Bankra (Barunhat PHC with 10).

Hasnabad block is one of the areas where ground water is affected by arsenic contamination.

== See also ==
- Hasnabad (Vidhan Sabha constituency)
