= Garakupi =

- Village
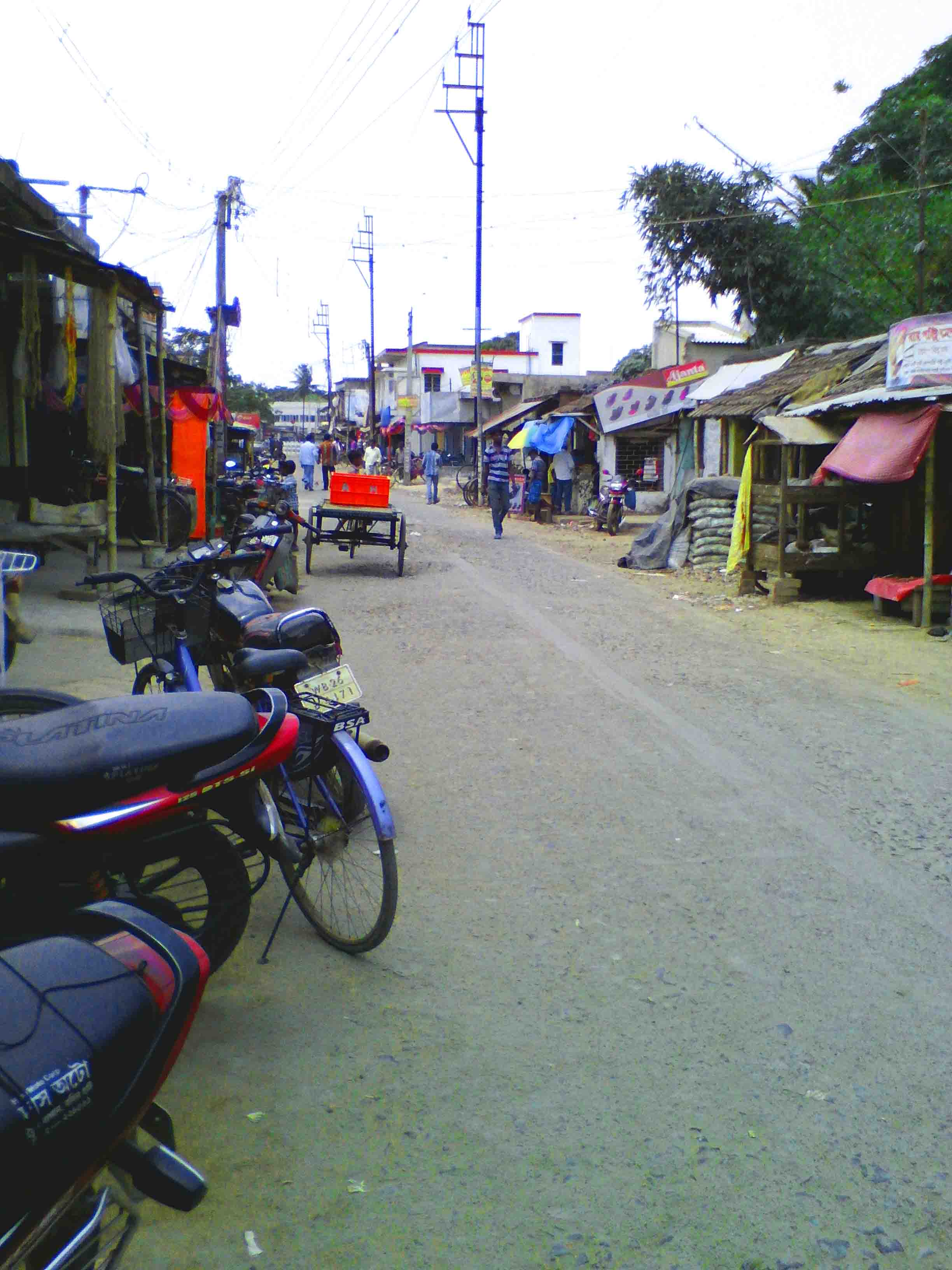
- North side

- Location in West Bengal, India(for direction see coordinate) Garakupi (India)
- Coordinates: 22.588354°N 88.805426°E
- Country: India
- State: West Bengal
- District: North 24 Parganas
- Block: Hasnabad

Population (2020)
  - Total: 5,002

Languages
  - Official: Bengali, English
- Time zone: UTC+5:30 (IST)
- PIN: 743456
- Area & Telephone code: 03217
- Vehicle registration: WB26
- Lok Sabha constituency: Basirhat
- Vidhan Sabha constituency: Basirhat Uttar
- Website: north24parganas.nic.in

Garakupi is a village in the Hasnabad CD Block in Basirhat subdivision of North 24 Parganas district, in the state of West Bengal, India.

== Etymology ==
Garakupi is a Bengali word adopted from old man many years ago. Garakupi had its earlier name "Garapota" but it is no more today. But something can be understood by this word pota is meant that something digging into soil and kupi has the same meaning to pota. So Gara may be a thing and it is dug into soil.

== Geography ==
It is one of 75 villages in Hasnabad Block.

== Demographics ==
As per the 2011 Census of India, Garakupi had a total population of 2,029, of which 1,036 (51%) were males and 993 (49%) were females. The population below 6 years was 215. The total number of literates in Garakupi was 1,275 (70.29% of the population over 6 years).

== Education ==
Garakupi High School is a higher secondary school situated on the breast of Garakupi. It is run by the State Government and affiliated with the West Bengal Board of Secondary Education and the West Bengal Council of Higher Secondary Education.
