= Murarisha =

- Village
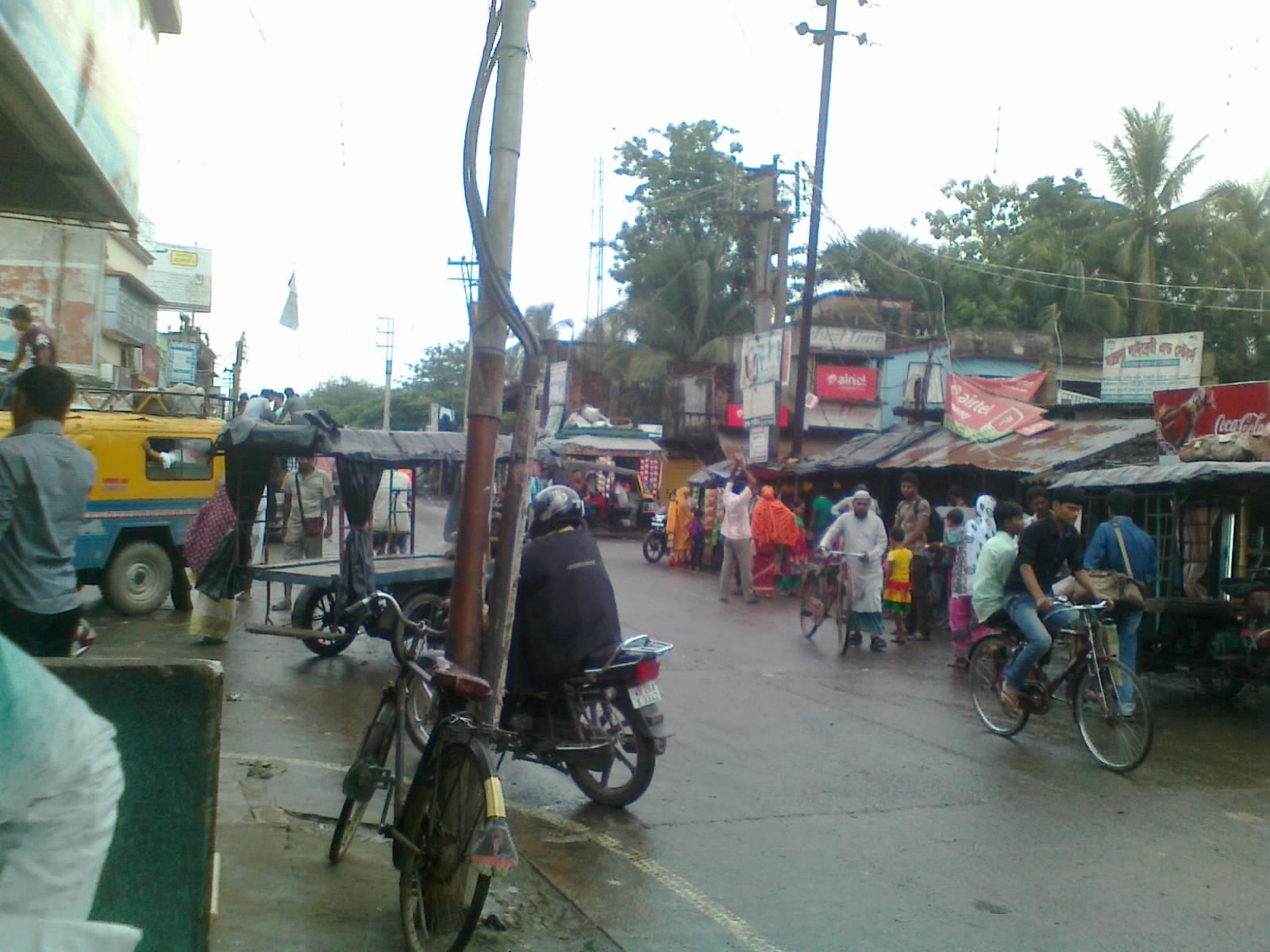
- Market on roadside from South to North view

- Location in West Bengal, India Murarisha (India)
- Coordinates: 22°34′25″N 88°50′30″E
- Country: India
- State: West Bengal
- District: North 24 Parganas
- Block: Hasnabad

Government
  - MP: Idris Ali
  - MLA: Rafikul Islam Mondal

Population (2011)
  - Total: 5,659

Languages
  - Official: Bengali, English
- Time zone: UTC5:30 (Indian Standard Time (IST))
- Postal Index Number (PIN): 743456
- Telephone code: 03217
- Vehicle registration: WB26
- Lok Sabha constituency: Basirhat
- Vidhan Sabha constituency: Basirhat Uttar
- Website: north24parganas.nic.in

Murarisaha is a village and a gram panchayat in Hasnabad CD block in Basirhat subdivision of North 24 Parganas district in the state of West Bengal, India.

== Geography ==
Cities, towns and locations in Basirhat subdivision, North 24 Parganas district
M: municipal town, CT: census town, R: rural/ urban centre
Owing to space constraints in the small map, the actual locations in a larger map may vary slightly

=== Area overview ===
The area shown in the map is a part of the Ichhamati-Raimangal Plain, located in the lower Ganges Delta. It contains soil of mature black or brownish loam to recent alluvium. Numerous rivers, creeks, and khals criss-cross the area. The tip of the Sundarbans National Park is visible in the lower part of the map (shown in green but not marked). The larger full screen map shows the full forest area. A large section of the area is a part of the Sundarbans settlements. The densely populated area is an overwhelmingly rural area. Only 12.96% of the population lives in the urban areas and 87.04% of the population lives in the rural areas.

=== Weather ===
The weather of Murarisha is similar to other places in West Bengal, with a tropical climate, specifically a tropical wet and dry climate(Aw) under the Köppen climate classification, with seven months of dryness and peak of rains in July. The cooler season from December to February is followed by the summer season from March to June. The period from June to about the end of September constitutes the south-west monsoon season, and October and November form the post-monsoon season. Between June and September, the south west monsoon rains lash the village. Pre-monsoon showers are received in May. Occasionally, north-east monsoon showers occur in October and November.

The maximum annual rainfall ever recorded was 1500 mm. The highest rainfall recorded in a single day was 850 mm. The average total annual rainfall is 1500 mm. The average annual temperature is 32 °C, and the average maximum temperature is 35 °C, while the average minimum temperature is 28 °C. In the summer the temperature is up to 35 °C, but in winter it drops to approximately 10 °C. Annual rainfall is about 1500 mm.

=== Geographical state ===
It belongs to Presidency division. It is located 55 km towards East from District headquarters Barasat. It is also 65 km from State capital Kolkata.

== Demographics ==
As per the 2011 Indian census, Murarisha had a population of about 5659 persons living in around 1006 households.

== Transport ==
Murarisha can be reached through various ways. It can be reached from major city Kolkata through Taki road. Murarisha is just 11 km from Basirhat railway station. Hasnabad railway station, Taki Road Railway Station are the nearby railway stations to Murarisha village. However Sealdah and Howrah Junction railway stations are major railway stations 65 km near Murarisha. Netaji Subhas Chandra Bose International Airport is 54 km from Murarisha. It also can be reached from Kolkata by bus from Razabazar CTC stands. These buses run through the Ghatakpukur-Malanchow-Chowmatha line, which takes just over two hours.
