= Taki, India =

Town in West Bengal, India

Taki
- Town
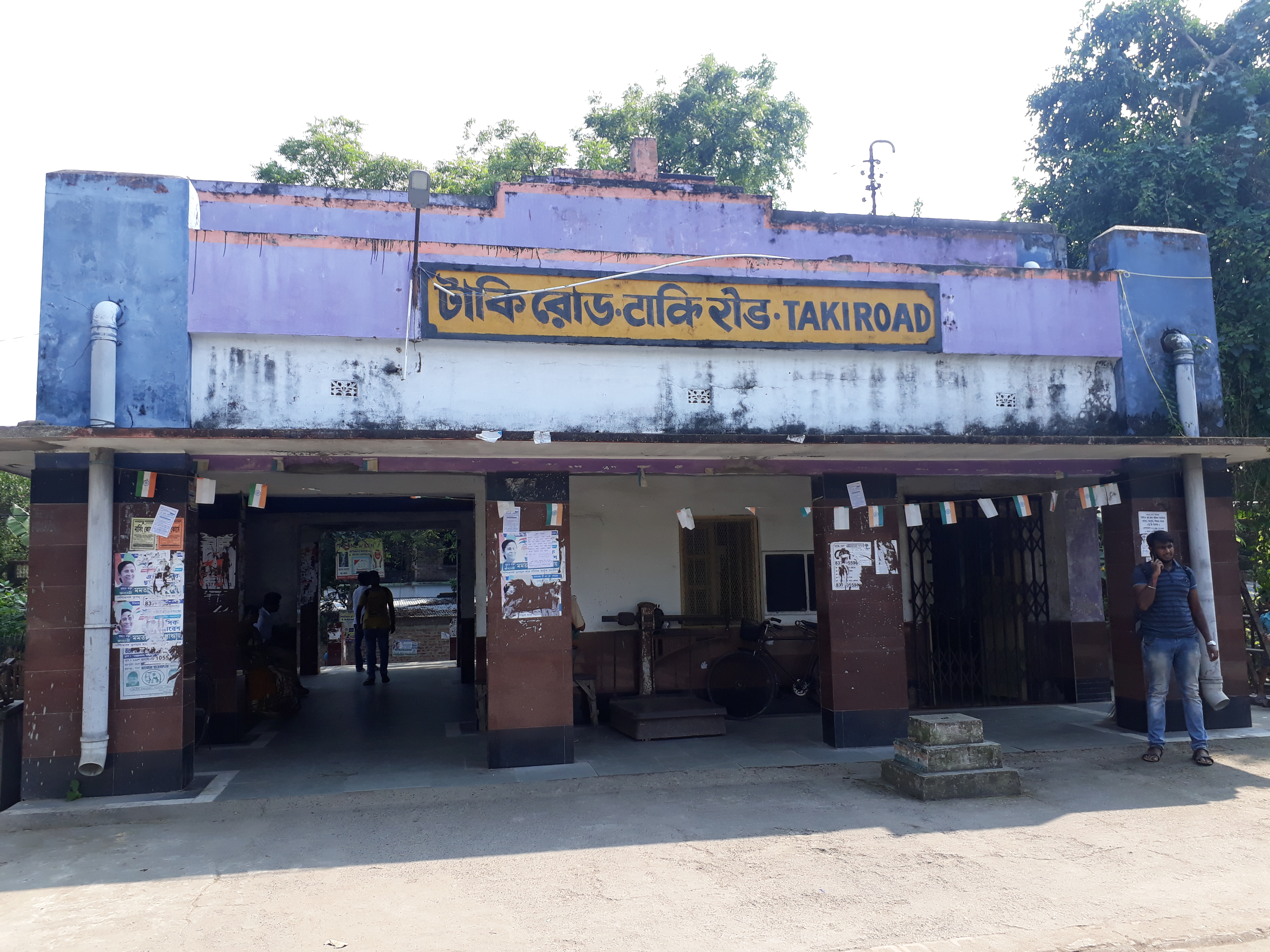
- Taki Road railway station

- Location in West Bengal, India Taki (India)
- Coordinates: 22.59°N 88.92°E
- Country: India
- State: West Bengal
- District: North 24 Parganas

Government
  - Type: Municipality
  - Body: Taki Municipality
  - Municipality Chairman: Somnath Mukhopadhaya

Area
  - Total: 15.54 km^{2} (6.00 sq mi)
- Elevation: 5 m (16 ft)

Population (2011)
  - Total: 38,263
  - Density: 2,462/km^{2} (6,377/sq mi)

Languages
  - Official: Bengali, English
- Time zone: UTC+5:30 (IST)
- PIN: 743429
- Telephone code: 03217
- Lok Sabha constituency: Basirhat
- Vidhan Sabha constituency: Basirhat Dakshin
- Website: https://takimunicipality.in

Taki is a Town and a municipality in Basirhat subdivision of North 24 Parganas district in the Indian state of West Bengal.

== Geography ==
Cities, towns and locations in Basirhat subdivision, North 24 Parganas district
M: municipal town, CT: census town, R: rural/ urban centre
Owing to space constraints in the small map, the actual locations in a larger map may vary slightly

=== Location ===
Taki is located at 22.59°N 88.92°E. It has an average elevation of 5 metres (16 feet) at the bank of Ichamati River.

=== Area overview ===
The area shown in the map is a part of the Ichhamati-Raimangal Plain, located in the lower Ganges Delta. It contains soil of mature black or brownish loam to recent alluvium. Numerous rivers, creeks and khals criss-cross the area. The tip of the Sundarbans National Park is visible in the lower part of the map (shown in green but not marked). The larger full screen map shows the full forest area. A large section of the area is a part of the Sundarbans settlements. The densely populated area is an overwhelmingly rural area. Only 12.96% of the population lives in the urban areas and 87.04% of the population lives in the rural areas.

Note: The map alongside presents some of the notable locations in the subdivision. All places marked in the map are linked in the larger full screen map.

== Demographics ==
According to the 2011 Census of India, Taki had a total population of 38,263, of which 19,562 (51%) were males and 18,701 (49%) were females. Population in the age range 0–6 years was 3,419. The total number of literate persons in Taki was 28,939 (83.05% of the population over 6 years).

As of 2001 India census, Taki had a population of 37,302. Males constitute 53% of the population and females 47%. Taki has an average literacy rate of 68%, higher than the national average of 59.5%: male literacy is 73%, and female literacy is 61%. In Taki, 10% of the population is under 6 years of age.

== Culture and education ==
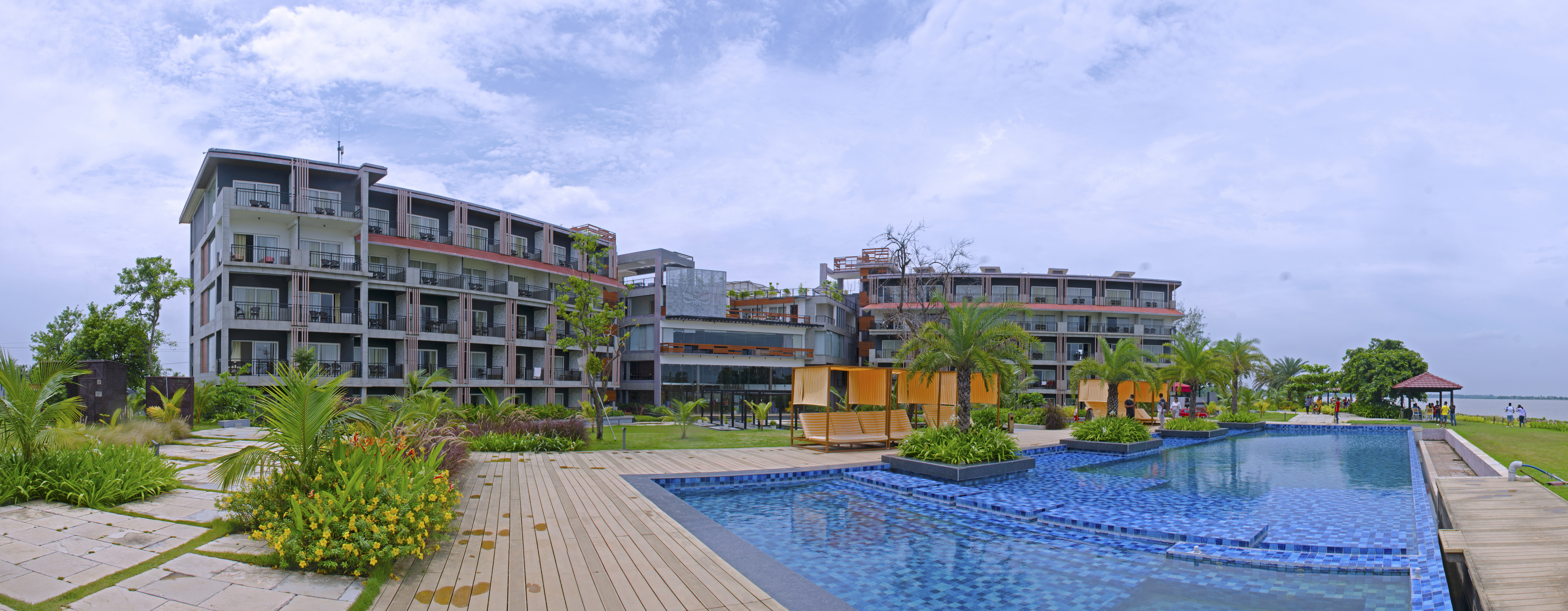
Sonar Bangla Hotel, Taki

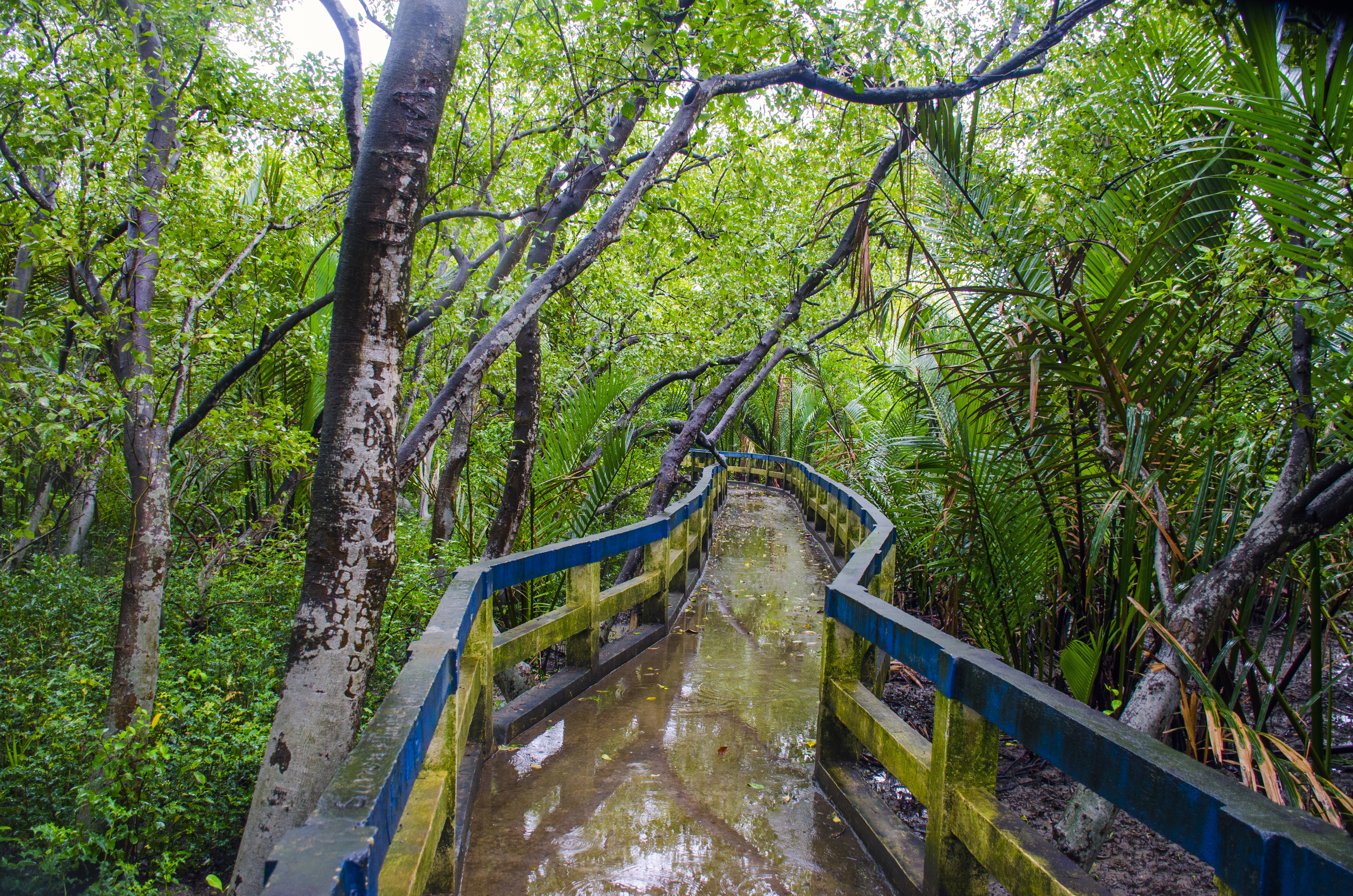
Canopy walk at Golpata Forest

There are a Library (Taki District Library) and a college named Taki Government College situated in Taki town. Taki Government High School, is the oldest school of this area. Other renowned schools like Taki S. L. Girls High School and Taki Bhabanath High School are there. Ramakrishna Mission also established a branch with Taki Ramakrishna Mission High School and hostel facilities in Taki.

Taki is known for its sweets called "Chhanar Malpoa" and Khajur Patal is also very popular at the time of winter. Other than local Kali Puja, Durga Puja, etc. this place became a tourist picnic spot beside the Ichamati river due to the international border between India and Bangladesh.

Taki Government College was established in 1950. Affiliated to the West Bengal State University, it offers honours courses in Bengali, English, Sanskrit, history, philosophy, political science, economics, geography, mathematics, chemistry, physics, botany and zoology, and a post-graduate course in Bengali.

== Transport ==
Taki Road railway station is on the Barasat-Hasnabad line, which is part of the Kolkata Suburban Railway system.

State Highway 2 passes through Taki.

== Healthcare ==
Taki Rural Hospital at Taki with 50 beds functions as the main medical facility in Hasnabad CD Block. There are primary health centres at Bhurkundu (Bhawanipur PHC with 10 beds), Bhebia (Ghola PHC with 6 beds) and Bara Bankra (Barunhat PHC with 10).

== Notable people ==
- Gautam Deb, former minister
- Bimal Kar, writer
- Shankar Roychowdhury, General of Indian Army
- Ashoke Kumar Sen, independent India's first law minister

== Gallery Of Taki ==
Ticket counter at Taki railway station

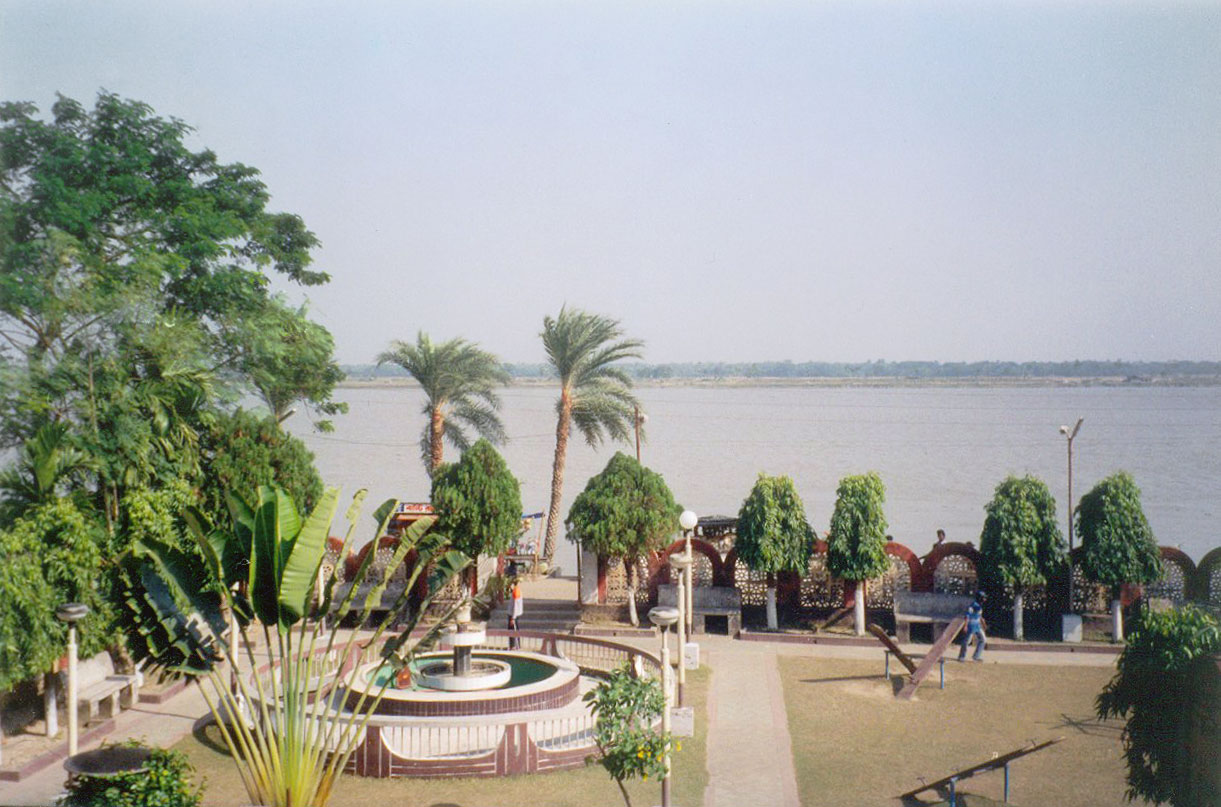
View from Taki Guest House. The shores of Bangladesh is visible on the other side of Ichamati River

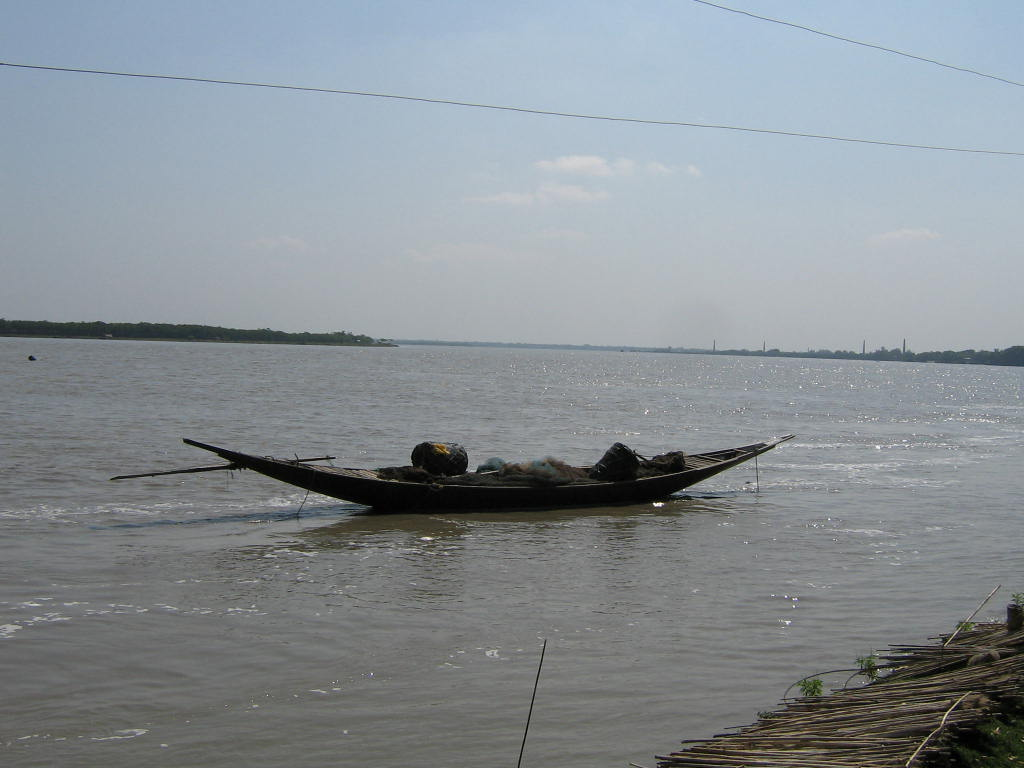
Ichhamati

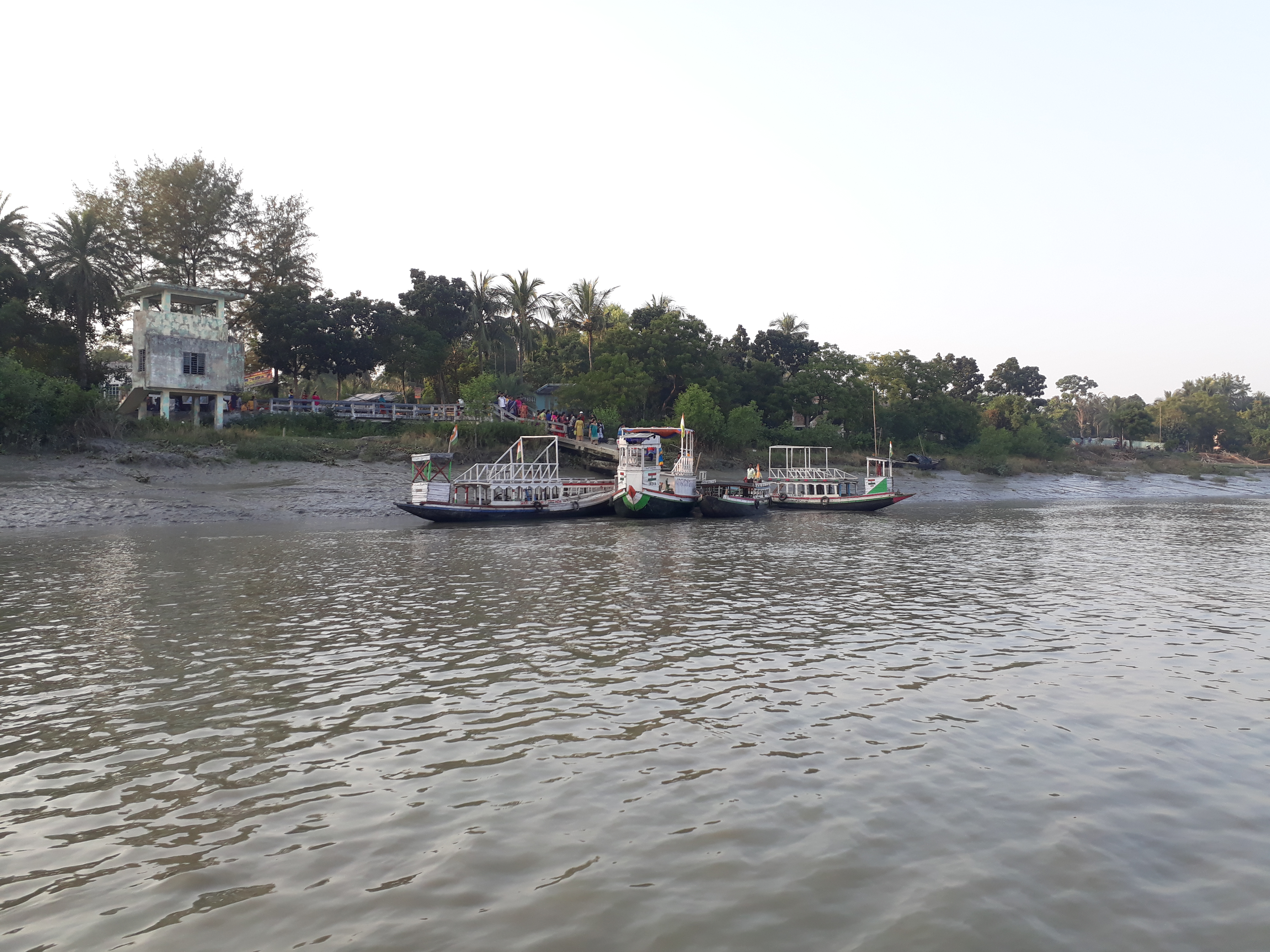
Boat ride at Ichhamati in Taki

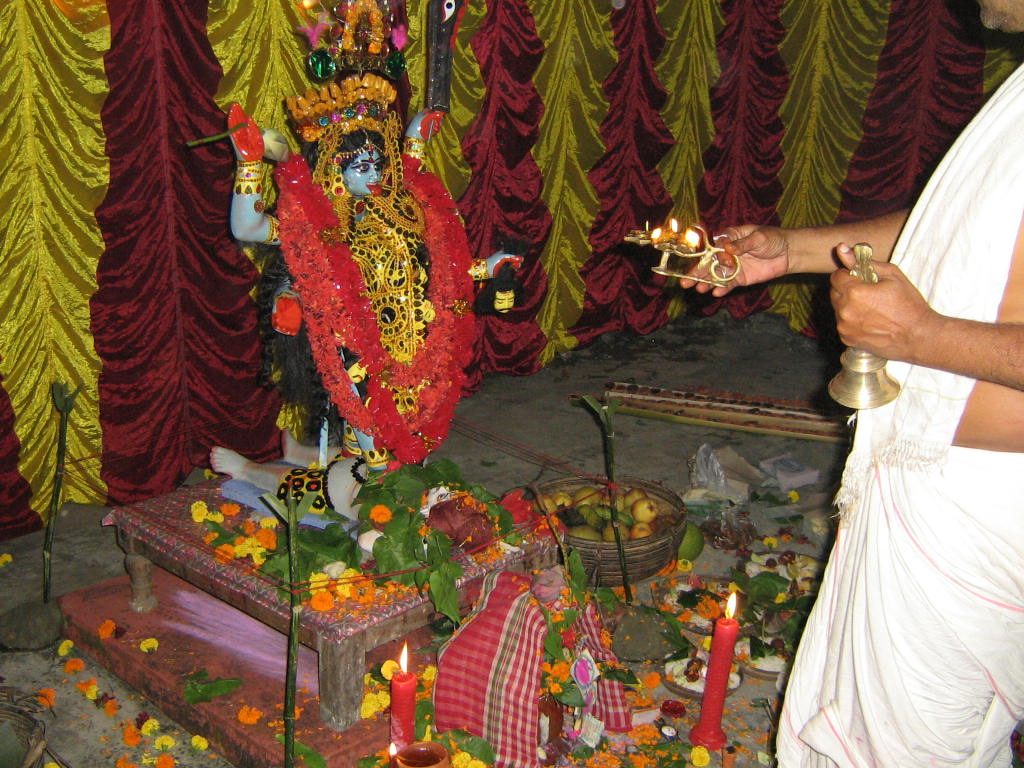
Kali Puja

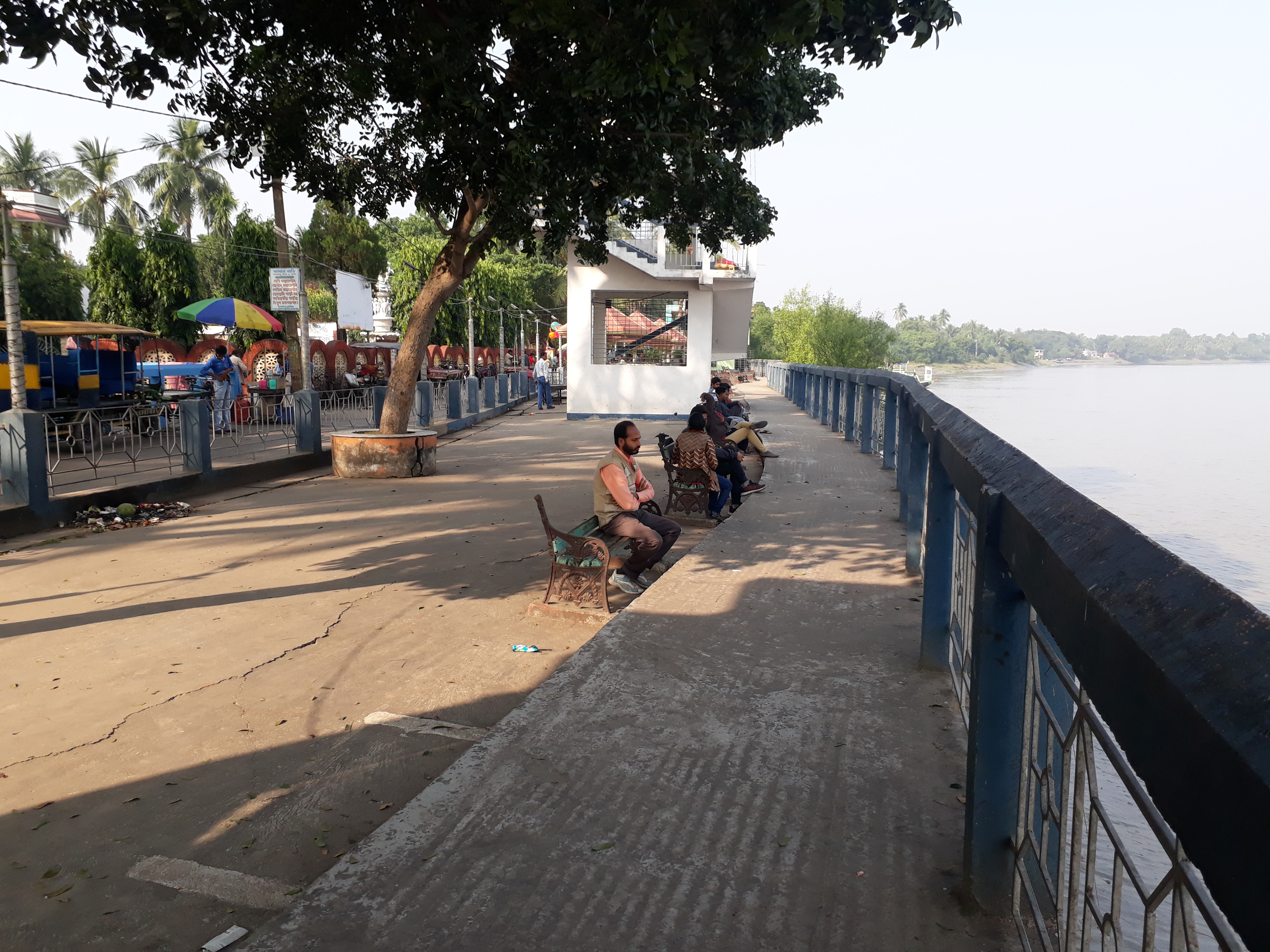
Taki, riverside road

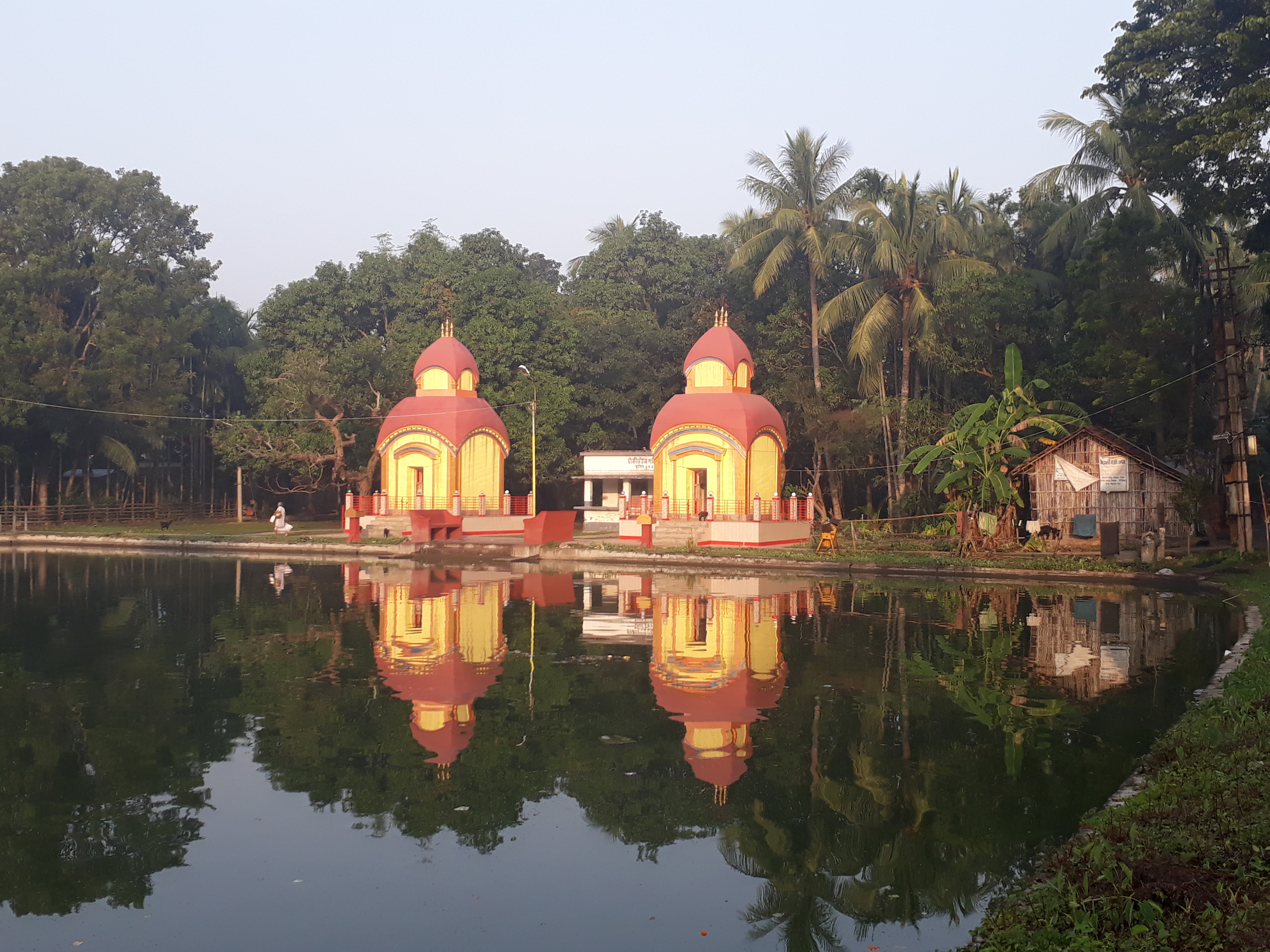
Taki Jora Temple

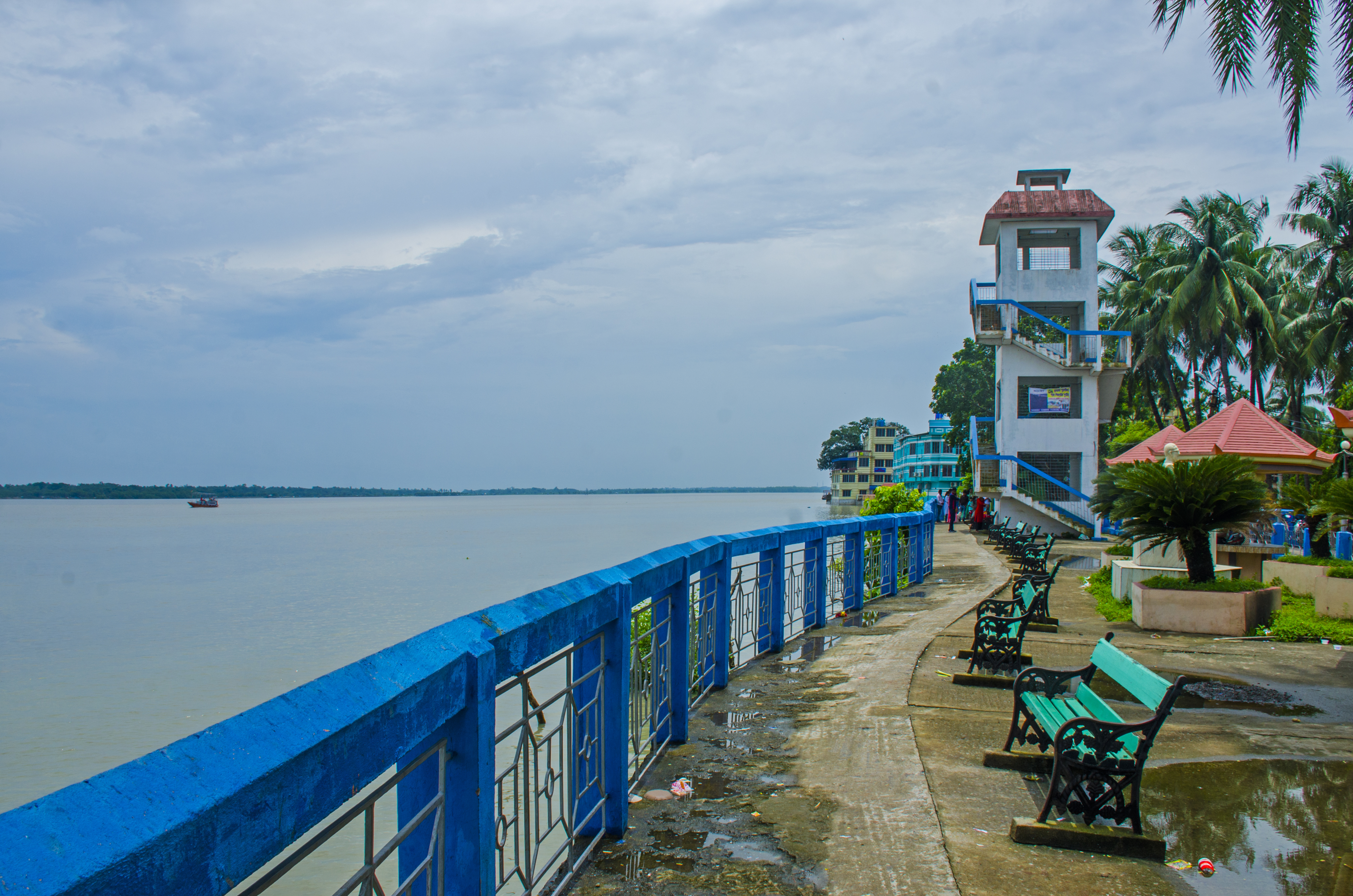
Taki watch tower and Ichamati River

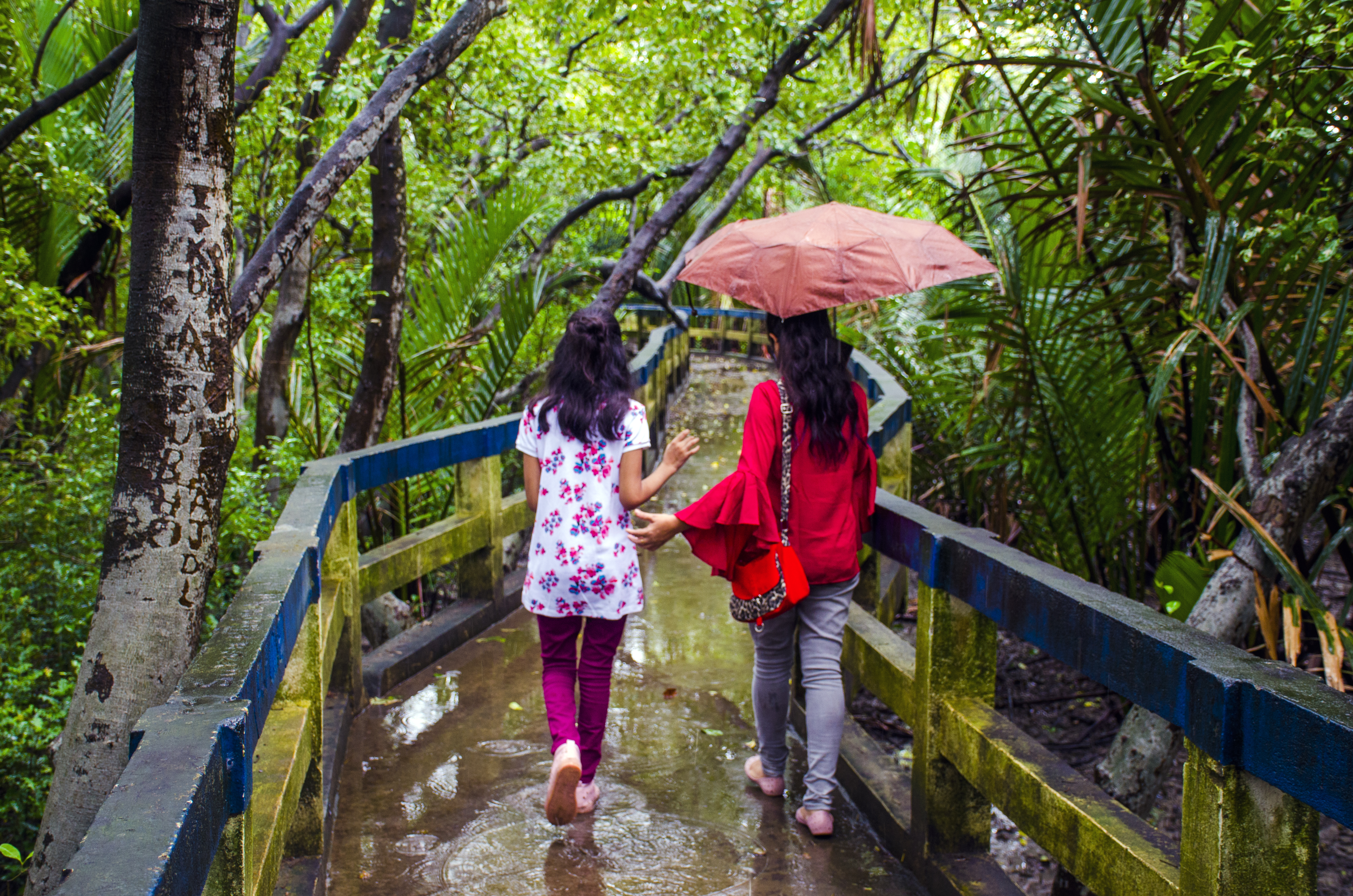
Tourist walk along the canopy walk of Golpata Forest

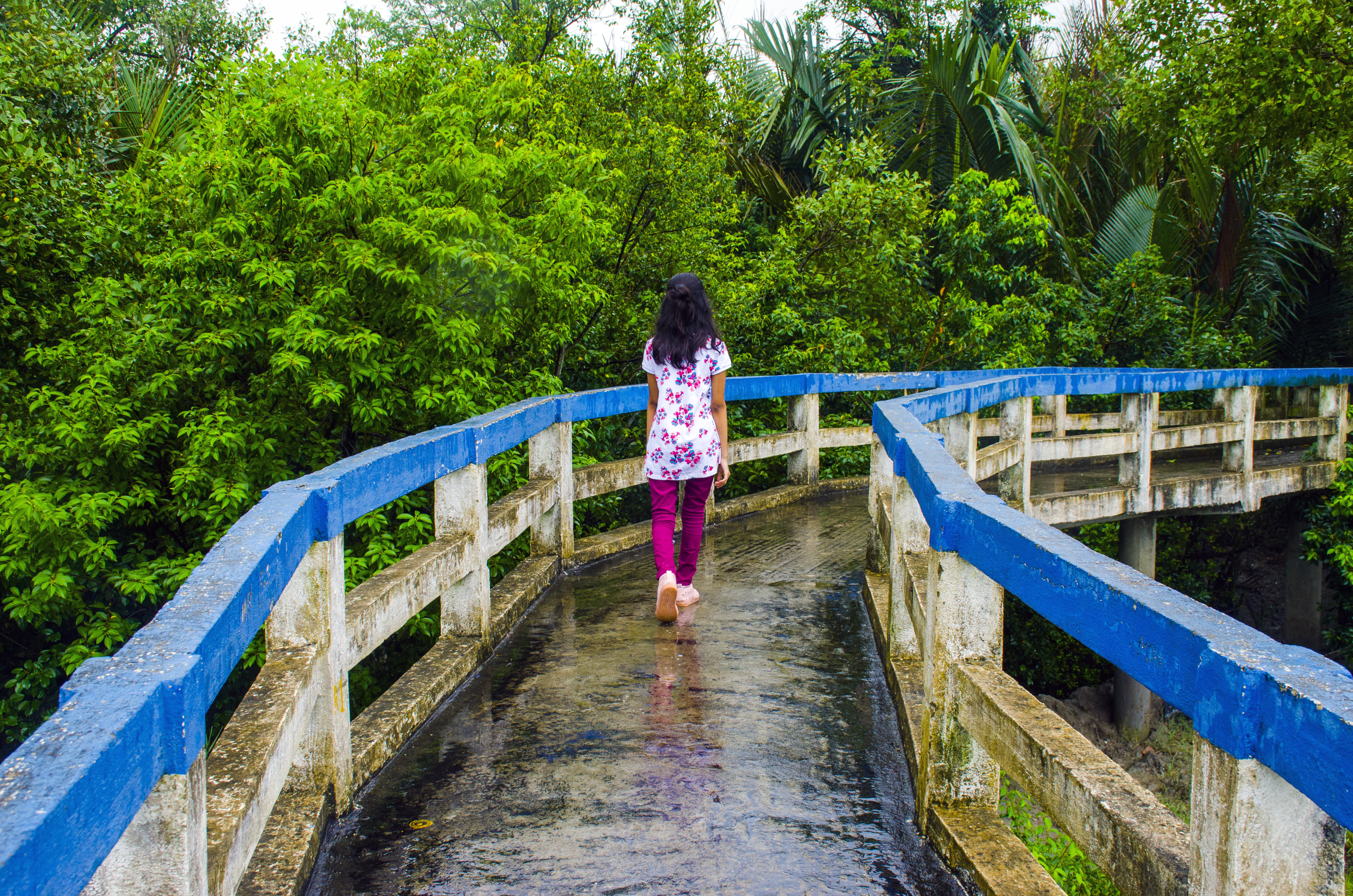
Tourist walk along the canopy walk of Golpata Forest
