= Kanchrapara =

- City
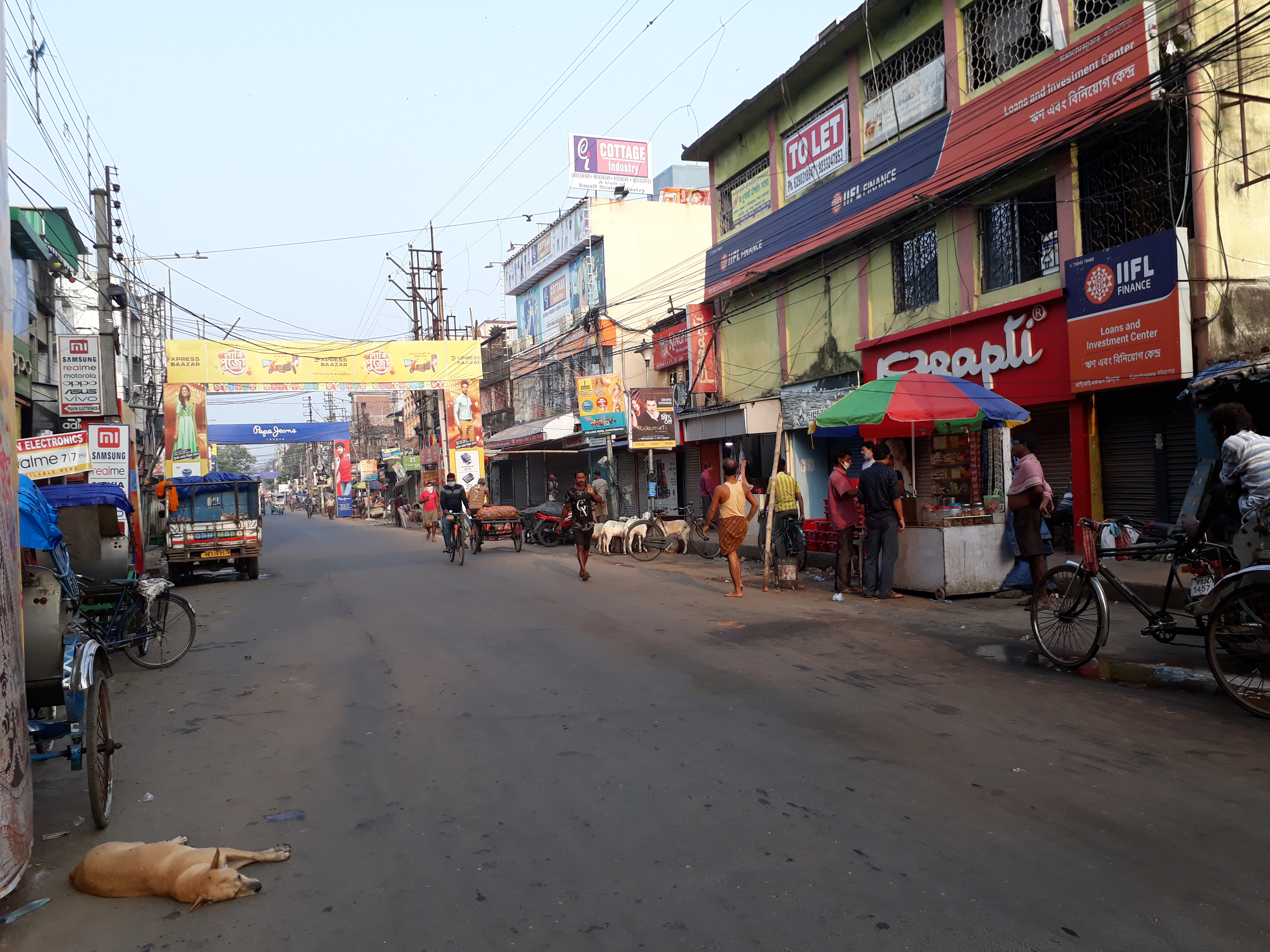
- Kabiguru Rabindra Path at Kanchrapara

- Location in West Bengal, India Kanchrapara (India)
- Coordinates: 22.94563°N 88.43322°E
- Country: India
- State: West Bengal
- Division: Presidency
- District: North 24 Parganas

Government
  - Type: Municipality
  - Body: Kanchrapara Municipality
  - Chairman: Kamal Adhikary

Area
  - Total: 9.07 km^{2} (3.50 sq mi)
- Elevation: 11 m (36 ft)

Population (2011)
  - Total: 129,576
  - Density: 14,300/km^{2} (37,000/sq mi)

Languages
  - Official: Bengali, English
- Time zone: UTC+5:30 (IST)
- PIN: 743145
- Telephone code: +91 33
- Vehicle registration: WB
- Lok Sabha constituency: Barrackpore
- Vidhan Sabha constituency: Bijpur
- Website: north24parganas.nic.in, kanchraparamunicipality.org.in

Kanchrapara is a city and a municipality of North 24 Parganas district in the Indian state of West Bengal. It is a part of the area covered by Kolkata Metropolitan Development Authority (KMDA).

== History ==
From early historical period, geographically, this area had been full of swamps, natural riverine lake, low land, water bodies sparse village-settlements surrounded by deep jungle infested with wild animals of all kinds. However, around this area, there were several dozen villages more or less prosperous. This area underwent development from 1862, the Sealdaha Kusthia Broad Gauge Railway Line, through an 1863 construction of a 132,000-square-metre (1,420,000 sq ft) locomotive workshop and railway station on the northernmost tip of Bizpur Mouza, undertaken by Eastern Bengal State Railway. In 1914, a carriage and wagon shop were added. Subsequently, a planned Railway Township was laid and built to the East & South West of the Workshops with a wide range of infrastructure. The resulting population increase caused the construction of huts and pucca buildings, necessitating the expansion of Municipal infrastructure beyond the Railway area. The Kanchrapara Municipality was carved out of the Halisahar municipality in the 1917, at the enterprise of Mr. Harnett, the then officer of Kanchrapara Railway Workshop. This city was named Kanchrapara since the Railway Station at Bijpur was named after the then village Kanchanpalli or Kanchrapara. It was prosperous economically and culturally, being the seat of many stalwarts of Baishnab literature and early Bengali literature.

== Geography ==
Cities and towns in the northern portion of Barrackpore subdivision in North 24 Parganas district
M: municipal city/ town, CT: census town,
N: neighbourhood, OG: outgrowth
Owing to space constraints in the small map, the actual locations in a larger map may vary slightly

=== Location ===
Kanchrapara is located at 22.56°N 88.26°E. It has an average elevation of 10 metres (32 feet).

Kanchrapara is bounded by Kalyani and Gayespur in Nadia district on the north, Jayanpur, Palladaha, Kampa, Srotribati, Chandua and Jetia on the east and Halisahar on the south and west. Bijpur is a neighbourhood in Kanchrapara.

96% of the population of Barrackpore subdivision (partly presented in the map alongside) lives in urban areas. In 2011, it had a density of population of 10,967 per km^{2} The subdivision has 16 municipalities and 24 census towns.

For most of the cities/ towns information regarding density of population is available in the Infobox. Population data is not available for neighbourhoods. It is available for the entire municipal area and thereafter ward-wise.

All places marked on the map are linked in the full-screen map.

=== Neighbourhoods ===
Kanchrapara railway station is in the city's north-east. On its Western Side lies the Greater Kanchrapara. One enters its central market area through the Station Road, which is a two-lane road. Then is the central roundabout of the city, the city's heart – Gandhi More. One road from Gandhi More leads to the 1.5 km long Workshop Road off to the esteemed Kanchrapara Railway Workshop towards the south and another road, Kabi Guru Rabindra Path, which is a 4 km long main road running westwards from Gandhi More till it merges with Rani Rashmoni Ghat Road, at Bagmore, the city's westernmost locality. The Eastern Side of the Station is called Little Kanchrapara or Gram (Rural) Kanchrapara. Here lies Kampa Panchayat, which houses the Kanchrapara Airfield and the Indian Army Camp. Nearby is Jonepur, which is home to a significant minority Christian population.

=== Police station ===
Bijpur police station under Barrackpore Police Commissionerate has jurisdiction over Kanchrapara and Halisahar Municipal areas.

=== Post Office ===
Kanchrapara has a delivery sub post office, with PIN 743145 in the North Presidency Division of North 24 Parganas district in Calcutta region. The other post offices with the same PIN are Bagermore, Binodnagar, Chandmari Road, Palashi, Kanchrapara Loco Shop, Barajonepur, Chandua, Majhipara and Saliadaha.

== Demographics ==
=== Population ===
Historical population
Year	Pop.	±%
1921	10,332	—
1931	15,005	+45.2%
1941	24,015	+60.0%
1951	56,668	+136.0%
1961	68,966	+21.7%
1971	78,768	+14.2%
1981	92,293	+17.2%
1991	104,231	+12.9%
2001	126,191	+21.1%
2011	120,345	−4.6%
Source: Census of India

As per the 2011 Census of India, Kanchrapara (municipal area + outgrowth) had a total population of 120,345, of which 60,707 (51%) were males and 59,638 (49%) were females. Population below 6 years was 9,947. The total number of literates in Kanchrapara was 108,092 (90.36% of the population over 6 years).

As of 2001 India census, Kanchrapara had a population of 126,118. Males constitute 52% of the population and females 48%. Kanchrapara has an average literacy rate of 81%, higher than the national average of 59.5%: male literacy is 86%, and female literacy is 76%. In Kanchrapara, 8% of the population is under 6 years of age.

=== Languages ===
Languages spoken in Kancharapara city (2011)
1. Bengali (67.4%)
2. Hindi (30.1%)
3. Bhojpuri (0.85%)
4. Odia (1.25%)
5. Santali (0.23%)
6. Others (0.56%)

=== Kolkata Urban Agglomeration ===
The following Municipalities, Census Towns and other locations in Barrackpore subdivision were part of Kolkata Urban Agglomeration in the 2011 census: Kanchrapara (M), Jetia (CT), Halisahar (M), Balibhara (CT), Naihati (M), Bhatpara (M), Kaugachhi (CT), Garshyamnagar (CT), Garulia (M), Ichhapur Defence Estate (CT), North Barrackpur (M), Barrackpur Cantonment (CB), Barrackpore (M), Jafarpur (CT), Ruiya (CT), Titagarh (M), Khardaha (M), Bandipur (CT), Panihati (M), Muragachha (CT) New Barrackpore (M), Chandpur (CT), Talbandha (CT), Patulia (CT), Kamarhati (M), Baranagar (M), South Dumdum (M), North Dumdum (M), Dum Dum (M), Noapara (CT), Babanpur (CT), Teghari (CT), Nanna (OG), Chakla (OG), Srotribati (OG) and Panpur (OG).

== Infrastructure ==
As per the District Census Handbook 2011, Kanchrapara Municipal city covered an area of 9.06 km^{2}, subdivided into 24 wards. Amongst the civic amenities it had 160.23 km of roads and both open and closed drains. Amongst the educational facilities It had 48 primary schools, 14 middle schools, 14 secondary schools, 14 senior secondary schools, 1 degree college for arts/science/commerce and 8 non-formal education centres. Amongst the social, recreational and cultural facilities it had 3 stadiums, 2 auditoriums/ community halls, 3 cinema/theatres, 6 public libraries and 6 reading rooms. It had several bank branches, including those of Indian Bank, State Bank of India, Bank of Baroda, UCO Bank, Punjab National Bank, Axis Bank, ICICI Bank among others. Kanchrapara has 3 petrol pumps, one near Gandhi More(East Kanchrapara), another at Lichubagan(Central Kanchrapara), and a yet another at Bagmore(West Kanchrapara)

See also Cities and towns in Barrackpore subdivision

== Economy ==
=== Kanchrapara Railway Workshop ===
Kanchrapara Railway Workshop was established by Eastern Bengal Railway in 1863, and served the defence department during World War II. With the introduction of electric traction in eastern India in 1962, Kanchrapara Railway Workshop was made a base workshop for periodic overhauling of electric locomotives and electric multiple stock of Eastern Railway and South Eastern Railway. It ranks first among the Indian Railways workshops in terms of number of EMU coaches overhauled and second in terms of number of electric locomotives overhauled. The Loco Complex mainly deals with repair and overhaul of electric locomotives and EMU motor coaches. The Carriage Complex deals with periodical overhauling of suburban and mainline EMU trains, DEMU trains, non-AC coaches, accident relief train vans and eight-wheeler tower cars.

=== Timber Industry ===
Wooden furniture-making and timber harvesting are the major economic factors at Kanchrapara.

=== KMDA ===
Kanchrapara Municipality is included in the Kolkata Metropolitan Area for which the KMDA is the statutory planning and development authority.

== Transport ==
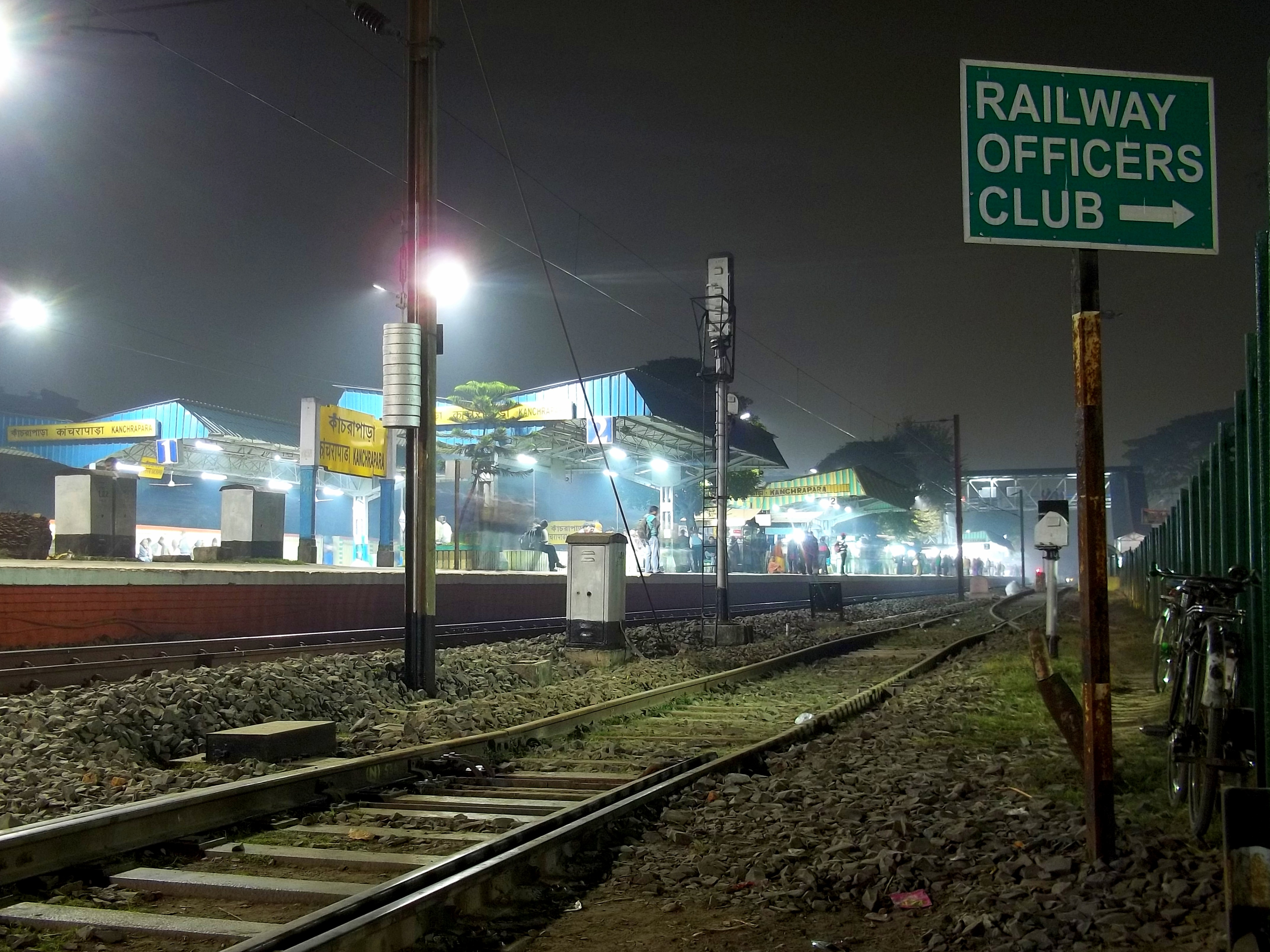
Kanchrapara railway station

- Airfield: Kanchrapara Airfield (for special military purpose).
- Railway: Kanchrapara railway station. EMU Trains, UP towards Krishnanagar City, Shantipur, Ranaghat, Chakdaha, Gede & Kalyani Simanta, DOWN towards Naihati, Barrackpore, Dum Dum, Sealdah, Budge Budge, Princep Ghat & Majherhat. Lalgola Passenger & MEMU.
- Roads & Highway: Kalyani Expressway, Kabiguru Rabindra Path, Kanchrapara Jaguli Road connects to NH 12 (old numbering NH 34). Private buses running across the town consist of route no. 85 to Barrackpore, route no. 88 to Barasat, route no. 22 to Nimtala, route no. 27 to Kalyani Simanta.
- Private Bus: 85 Barrackpore Court – Shyamnagar – Naihati – Kanchrapara, 88 Barasat – Amdanga – Jaguli – Kanchrapara, 22 Kanchrapara – Haringhata – Nimtala, 27 Kanchrapara – Kalyani Simanta, E48 Kanchrapara – Jaguli – Barasat – New Town – Salt Lake Karunamoyee.

== Culture ==
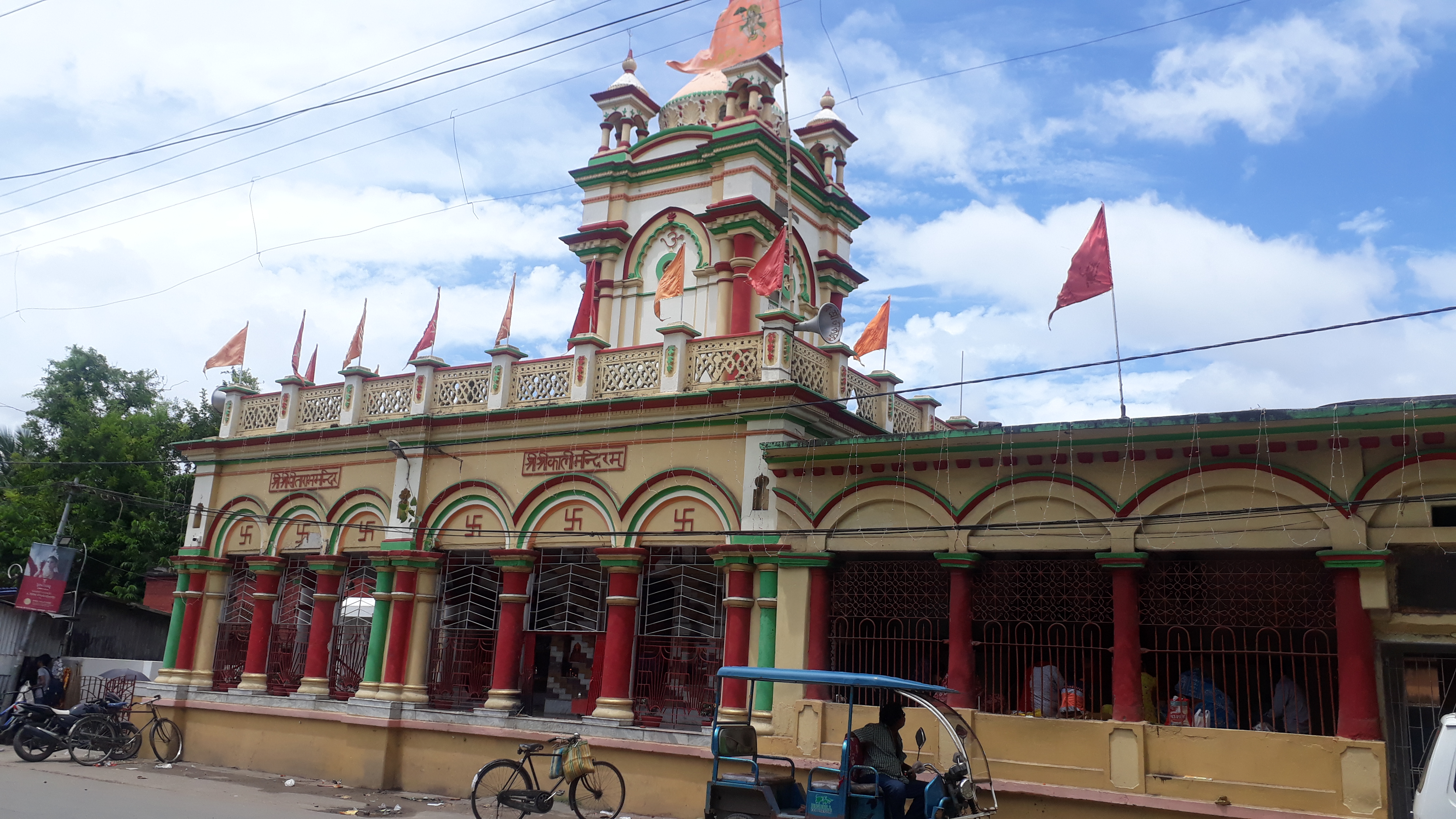
Dakat Kali temple at Kanchrapara

Kanchrapara has the Krishna-Raya Temple, dedicated to Lord Krishna, which is a point of attraction. Other attractions of the town include religious temples like the Dakat Kali Mandir and Station Kali Bari. There is Bager Mosque, oldest mosque in the district located in the Bag more in the town. Churches are found predominantly in the Kanchrapra Railway Workshop complex and in Jonepur. The Vishwakarma Puja is conducted in the Kanchrapara Railway Workshop every year with great pomp and splendour. Annual Cricket tournament, the Kanchrapara Premiere League (KPL), is held in the playground behind the Kanchrapara College during the winter.

== Education ==
There is a college named Kanchrapara College under the University of Kalyani.

Schools such as Kendriya Vidyalaya No.1 Kanchrapara and Kendriya Vidyalaya No.2 Kanchrapara are also present in the locality which are under the Ministry of Human Resource Development, Government of India. Other well known educational institutes are St.Joseph's School, Kanchrapara Harnett English Medium School (C.B.S.E), Kanchrapara Harnett High School for Boys, Kanchrapara Indian Girls' High School, Kanchrapara Municipal Politechnic High School, Kanchrapara Sharada Devi Uchcha Baalika Vidyalaya, Jonepur High School for Boys, Jonepur Girls School, Kanchrapara High School (W.B.B.S.E.), Kanchrapara Albatross School, Kanchrapara Shree Mandhari High School (H.S) (Hindi Medium), Kanchrapara Janta High School (H.S) (Hindi Medium), Kanchrapara Ram Prasad High School (H.S) (Hindi Medium). Kanchrapara houses Indira Gandhi National Open University centre from where students can receive higher distance education at minimal costs.

== Healthcare ==
Kanchrapara Railway Hospital functions with 220 beds and Shibani Arogya Niketan with 8 beds. Private health units include Night Angel Nursing Home, etc. North 24 Parganas district has been identified as one of the areas where groundwater is affected by arsenic contamination.

== Cuisine ==
Kanchrapara is well renowned for its sweets — especially its gujiya and traditionally cooked rosogolla.

== Notable people ==
- Ishwar Chandra Gupta, renowned Bengali poet, was born at Rathtallah, Gram Kanchrapara.
- Tarak Nath Das, Indian Revolutionary and one of the first American Indians
- Mukul Roy, Indian politician of the All India Trinamool Congress hails from Kanchrapara.
