= Bijpur, North 24 Parganas =

Bijpur
- Neighbourhood
- Location in West Bengal, India Bijpur (India)
- Coordinates: 22.9478°N 88.4467°E
- Country: India
- State: West Bengal
- Division: Presidency
- District: North 24 Parganas

Government
  - Type: Municipality
  - Body: Kanchrapara Municipality
- Elevation: 13 m (43 ft)

Languages
  - Official: Bengali, English
- Time zone: UTC+5:30 (IST)
- PIN: 743134, 743145
- Telephone code: +91 33
- Vehicle registration: WB
- Lok Sabha constituency: Barrackpore
- Vidhan Sabha constituency: Bijpur
- Website: north24parganas.nic.in

Bijpur is a neighbourhood in Kanchrapara of North 24 Parganas district in the Indian state of West Bengal. It is a part of the area covered by Kolkata Metropolitan Development Authority (KMDA).

== Geography ==
Cities and towns in the northern portion of Barrackpore subdivision in North 24 Parganas district
M: municipal city/ town, CT: census town,
N: neighbourhood, OG: outgrowth
Owing to space constraints in the small map, the actual locations in a larger map may vary slightly

=== Location ===
Bijpur is located at 22.93°N 88.43°E. It has an average elevation of 13 metres (43 feet).

96% of the population of Barrackpore subdivision (partly presented in the map alongside) live in urban areas. In 2011, it had a density of population of 10,967 per km^{2} The subdivision has 16 municipalities and 24 census towns.

For most of the cities/ towns information regarding density of population is available in the Infobox. Population data is not available for neighbourhoods. It is available for the entire municipal area and thereafter ward-wise.

All places marked on the map are linked in the full-screen map.

=== Police station ===
Bijpur police station under Barrackpore Police Commissionerate has jurisdiction over Kanchrapara and Halisahar Municipal areas.

=== Kolkata Urban Agglomeration ===
The following Municipalities, Census Towns and other locations in Barrackpore subdivision were part of Kolkata Urban Agglomeration in the 2011 census: Kanchrapara (M), Jetia (CT), Halisahar (M), Balibhara (CT), Naihati (M), Bhatpara (M), Kaugachhi (CT), Garshyamnagar (CT), Garulia (M), Ichhapur Defence Estate (CT), North Barrackpur (M), Barrackpur Cantonment (CB), Barrackpore (M), Jafarpur (CT), Ruiya (CT), Titagarh (M), Khardaha (M), Bandipur (CT), Panihati (M), Muragachha (CT) New Barrackpore (M), Chandpur (CT), Talbandha (CT), Patulia (CT), Kamarhati (M), Baranagar (M), South Dumdum (M), North Dumdum (M), Dum Dum (M), Noapara (CT), Babanpur (CT), Teghari (CT), Nanna (OG), Chakla (OG), Srotribati (OG) and Panpur (OG).

== Economy ==
Bhushan Steel, which had signed an agreement with West Bengal government for setting up a 2 million tonne integrated steel and power plant at Salanpur in Bardhaman district, was to set up a cold rolled unit at Bijpur. Covering 100 acres (0.40 km^{2}) of land this project was to have a capacity of five lakh tons. It was cleared by West Bengal government on 22 August 2007. In 2012, Bhusan Steel put the Salanpur project on hold because of non-availability of land and other problems.

== Healthcare ==
North 24 Parganas district has been identified as one of the areas where ground water is affected by arsenic contamination. In Bijpur Kanchrapara, there are few Nursing Homes, Polyclinics and Hospitals include Kanchrapara's Shibani Hospital and Halisahar's Naanna Hospital.
