= Kolkata Eye =

Proposed Ferris wheel in Kolkata, India

- Interactive map of the Kolkata Eye area

General information
- Status: Never built
- Type: Ferris wheel
- Location: Kolkata, India
- Cost: ₹100 crore rupees (2011 estimate) ₹300 crore rupees (2014 estimate) ₹380 crore rupees (2015 estimate)

Kolkata Eye (or Calcutta Eye) is a proposed name for a giant Ferris wheel which it was hoped would be constructed in Kolkata, West Bengal, India. It was announced in 2011, and in May 2014 Mamata Banerjee, Chief Minister of West Bengal, stated "it is expected to be ready in a year's time", but it was never built.

== History ==
It was originally anticipated that the project would cost ₹100 crores, be between 150 m (490 ft) and 180 m (590 ft) in diameter, accommodate over 500 people in more than 30 passenger capsules, and take approximately 30 minutes to complete a full revolution.

In June 2011 it was reported that Merlin Entertainments had warned that it would take legal action if an attraction not built and managed by Merlin was to use the 'Eye' name, stating "The 'Eye' is exclusively Merlin's brand globally. It is an iconic name in which we have invested, and continue to invest significantly ... we therefore will not allow it, or any of our other brands, to be used generically for commercial or promotional advantage to describe attractions over which we have no control. Unauthorised use of any of our brands potentially damages both their reputation and that of Merlin as a whole, and we will always take whatever steps are required to stop such use."

In August 2012 The Times of India reported that the state urban development department had identified a two-acre plot, alongside the Hooghly River, belonging to the Kolkata Port Trust. Firhad Hakim, state urban development and municipal affairs minister under the Government of West Bengal, said "once we are able to get the plot, a project report will be prepared, following which the expression of interest will be floated to invite private players to execute the project." Previously, the state government had written to the ministry of shipping to allow the plot to be auctioned by the Kolkata Port Trust, enabling the state government to buy it, and discussed the project, which it wished to implement on a public-private-partnership basis, with representatives of UK-based companies at Writers' Building. The port authorities also agreed to the proposal, the prodeeds from which would fund pension payments.

In February 2014 The Times of India reported that steps to progress the project had been taken by Mamata Banerjee, the Chief Minister of West Bengal, that the Kolkata Metropolitan Development Authority would be the nodal agency of the construction project, and that a 2-acre site opposite the Millennium Park had been handed over to the urban development department for the project. Hakim said the department had already acquired land for the project, and that as well as selecting private players for the project, the government also intended to get in touch with UK-based experts for technical assistance.

In May 2014, by which time overall height had been reduced to 120 m (390 ft) and estimated cost had risen three-fold to ₹300 crores, Banerjee said in a Facebook post "It is already underway and is expected to be ready in a year's time." However, Hakim stated that "The project will be completed within 18 months of the date of commissioning," with commissioning likely to occur in three months, while urban development department officials estimated construction would take about two years. The Telegraph reported that the bid to build the attraction was won by a UK-based firm on 21 May. According to Hakim, the CMDA, Calcutta Port Trust, which is providing the land for the project, and the UK-based firm, formed a consortium to set up the structure. The Telegraph also reported that Sun Consultancy Investment and Consortium was selected through a tendering process in which the only other bidder was an unnamed Bhubaneswar-based company. However, The Times of India subsequently reported that London-based Sun Consulting and Investment (UK) had, through its Indian arm, "bagged the job" to run the wheel complex for 30 years in "a global tender participated by four other construction giants", and quoted Sun Consulting and Investment chief Sudipto Bose as saying "It was the call of chief minister Mamata Banerjee."

In September 2014, by which time the project was being referred to as the Kolkata Giant Wheel, The Times of India reported that the wheel would be erected on an 11 m (36 ft) tall base structure, giving a total overall height of 131 m (430 ft), and that an unnamed Chinese company with "experience of setting up 100 such giant wheels" worldwide "is doing the job". Bose was quoted as saying: "We are already on target as the production and initial testing of the wheel has already started elsewhere. We are expecting our initial shipments to arrive around May 2015 so that we can launch it even before 2015 Pujas [mid-October 2015]", and claimed that a major UK delegation, led by the UK minister for either trade or tourism, together with the Bengal Chief Minister, would attend a ground-breaking ceremony in November 2014. Bose also stated "London Eye is 135 meter high. By the time of completion, [the Kolkata wheel] would be the third-tallest wheel in the world" - apparently unaware that the London Eye had already dropped to world's third-tallest status over six years previously, when the 165 m (541 ft) Singapore Flyer was completed in February 2008, and was further relegated to world's fourth-tallest when the 167.6 m (550 ft) Las Vegas High Roller opened in March 2014. Bose is head of Sun Consulting and Investment, which was given a 30-year lease to run the wheel by Banerjee, and has the responsibility of securing over 75% of the project's financing.

In January 2015, by which time its estimated cost had further risen to ₹380 crores, The Times of India reported that the project was "still a pipe dream".

In November 2017, a Kolkata Metropolitan Development Authority source was reported as having said that a second tender was to be called and completed within the next two years, with engineering procurement and construction to follow later. It was also reported that the height of the project had been further scaled back to 90 metres (300 ft).

In March, 6th, 2025, Shyama Prasad Mookerjee Port Trust floated a tender to build Kolkata eye project in Foreshore road howrah. The height of the project shall be minimum of 70 meters.
