= Kanchrapara Harnett High School =

Kanchrapara Harnet High School

Location
- Kanchrapara - Haringhata Rd, Kanchrapara Loco; Kanchrapara, West Bengal, 743145; India; 22.938145°N 88.449831°E

Information
- Established: 1888
- School district: North 24 Parganas
- Website: school.banglarshiksha.gov.in/ws/website/index/19113000202

Kanchrapara Harnett High School, established in 1888, is one of the oldest higher secondary school located in Kanchrapara, North 24 Parganas, West Bengal, India.

The school follows the course curricula of West Bengal Board of Secondary Education (WBBSE) and West Bengal Council of Higher Secondary Education (WBCHSE) for Standard 10th and 12th Board examinations respectively.

== History ==
The school was started as a primary school in 1888 and secondary section was introduced in 1921 with the name Kanchrapara Harnett School. The school was named after Mr. Harnett, the then officer of Kanchrapara Railway Workshop.

== See also ==
- Education in India
- List of schools in India
- Education in West Bengal
