= Millennium Park (Kolkata) =

Public park in Kolkata

Coordinates: 22.574454°N 88.345321°E

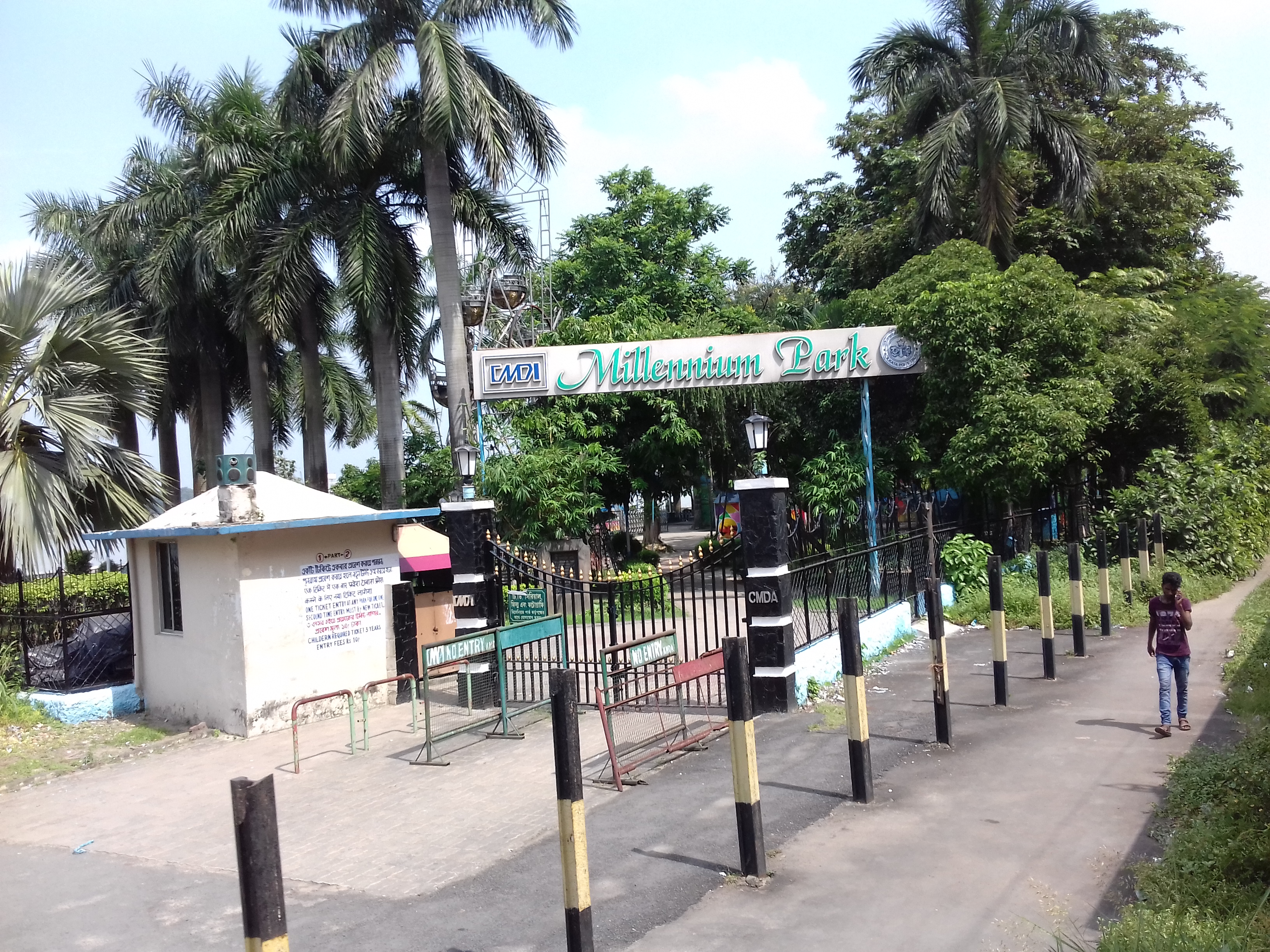
- Millennium Park (Kolkata) Entrance
- Interactive map of Millennium Park
- Location: Hooghly Riverfront, Kolkata
- Area: 6.2 acres (2.5 ha)
- Created: 26 Dec 1999
- Operator: Kolkata Metropolitan Development Authority

Millennium Park is a public park in Kolkata, situated along the Strand Road on eastern shore of Hooghly River for a stretch of 2.5 km, near Fairlie Ghat opposite to the Railway Club. The park consists of landscaped gardens and children's amusement rides. It was opened along the Hooghly shoreline to provide a green area for Kolkata's polluted waterway. It was inaugurated on 26 December 1999 as a millennium gift from Kolkata Metropolitan Development Authority. The park is a part of the first phase of the Kolkata Riverside Beautification Project.

Afternoon view of Howrah from Millennium Park (Kolkata)

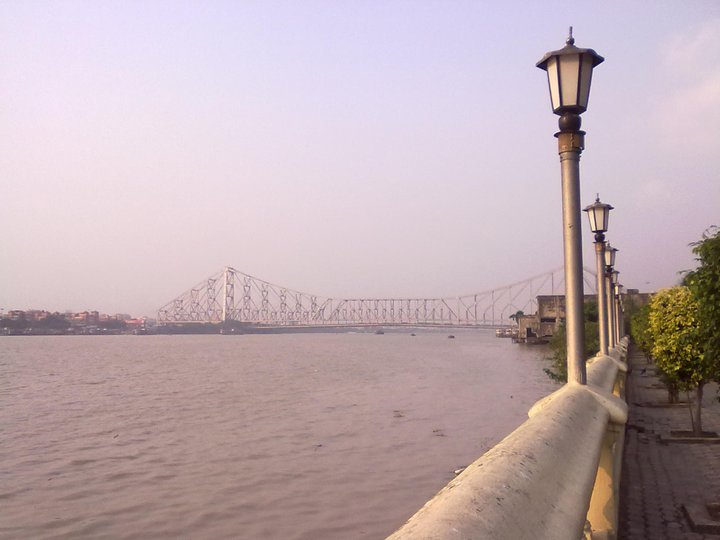
View of Howrah Bridge from Millennium Park (Kolkata)

== Entertainment tools ==
The park has a large variety of trees and light fixtures. It offers a variety of activities including a kids zone, a playground, a toy train, pirate themed rides, amusement attractions such as bumpy cars, and boat rides. This park also has a big food court with eight stalls that caters to its visitors. The Government of West Bengal has started many projects to enhance the beauty of the Ganges river. The people of Kolkata come here to spend a quiet and relaxed evening on a special occasion. The Howrah Bridge sound and light show can be witnessed from here.

== See also ==
- Hooghly Riverfront
- Eco Park
- Nature Park
