= Kanchrapara Railway Workshop =

Railway workshop in India

Coordinates: 22.938°N 88.444°E

- Type: Government Sector
- Industry: Rail Transport
- Founded: 1863; 163 years ago
- Headquarters: Kanchrapara, West Bengal, India
- Key people: Subhash Chandra (CWM)
- Number of employees: 7025 (September 2024)
- Parent: Indian Railways
- Website: Kanchrapara Workshop

The Kanchrapara Railway Workshop is one of the major workshops of Indian Railways, and is located in the Sealdah division of the Eastern Railway zone. It is divided into two complexes — Loco Complex and Carriage Complex. It caters to the major overhauling of a large product mix of IR, including locomotives (WAP7, WAP4, WAG9, WAG7, ), ICF Coaches, EMUs, MEMUs, DEMUs, Tower Cars, etc. Its mention can be found in Satyajit Ray's short story "Patol Babu Superstar", which was also included in the Class 10 English Communicative Curriculum of the CBSE.

== History ==
Kanchrapara Railway Workshop was established in 1863. Initial activities included the periodic overhauling of steam locomotives, wooden body Carriage and Wagons. The workshop also carried out overhauling and repair of aircraft during world war as well as manufacture of armoured cars and hand-grenade shells. This workshop also had the privilege of turning out the first electric locomotive after Periodic Overhauling (POH) in 1965 and the first Electric Multiple Unit motor coach was turned out after POH in the very same year.

== Organizational structure ==
The workshop is headed by an SAG grade officer designated as Chief Workshop Manager.

== Loco Complex ==
This is first complex which was established as part of workshop. Being used for overhauling of locomotives, it was named loco complex. Active shops :

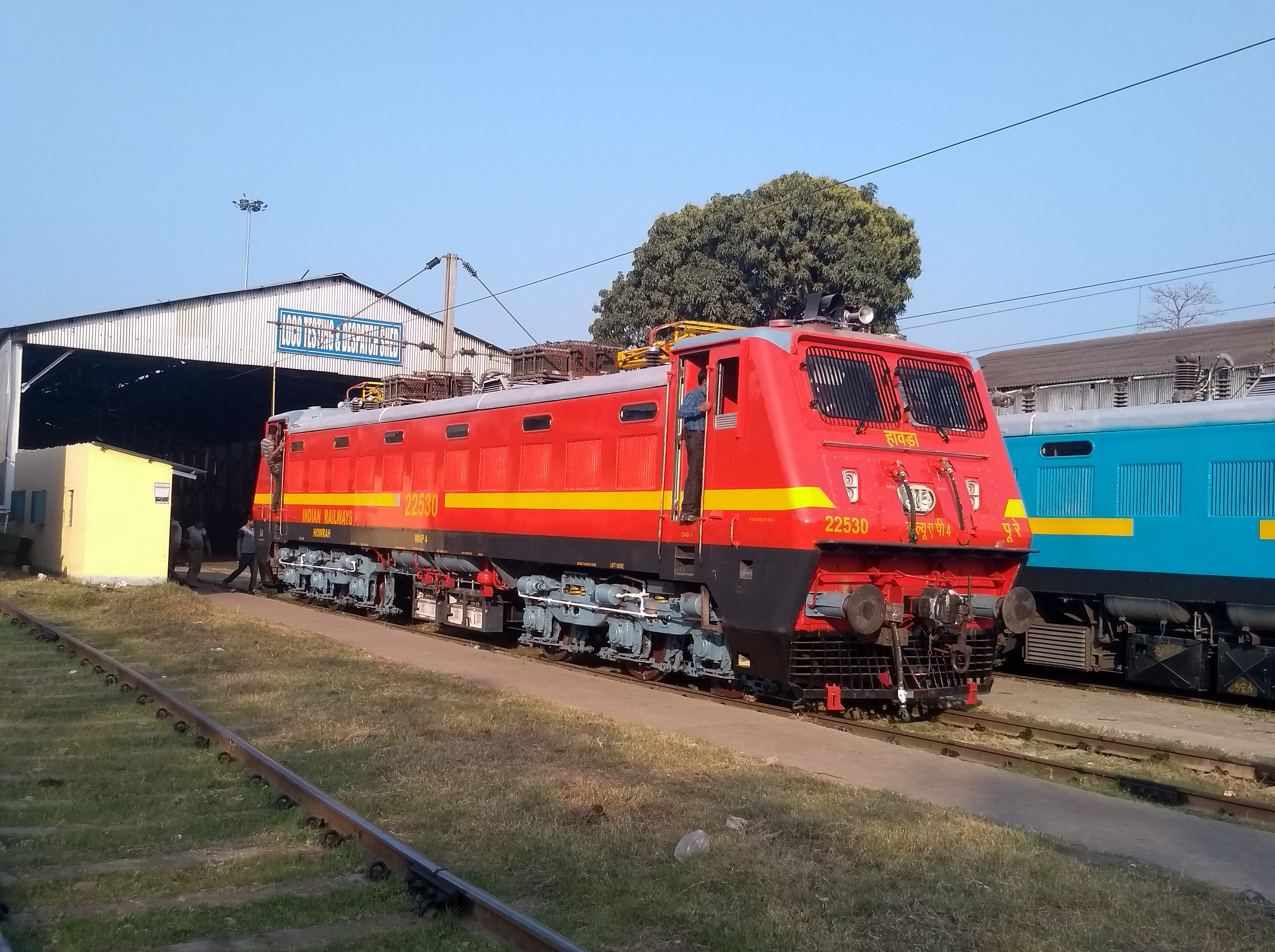
22530_WAP4_HWH after POH+RC+RP on 16-02-2019

- Wheel Shop (Shop 2A) : It carries out rediscing/overhauling of wheel sets of electric locomotives and EMUs.
- Heavy Corrosion Repair Shop
- Welding Shop (Shop 3)
- Locomotive POH and Erection Shop (Shop 11)
- EMU POH and Erection Shop (Shop 11A)
- Apparatus Overhauling Shop (Shop 9 and 9A)
- Armature Rewinding Shop (Shop 14)
- Bogie Overhauling and Mechanical Repair Shop (Shop 10)
- Crane Maintenance Shop (Shop 6)
- EC Loco Shop (Shop 12).

=== Stores Depot ===
It caters to the requirements of workshop as well as loco sheds and EMU carsheds of Eastern Railway. It is headed by a Senior Scale Officer under independent charge.

== Carriage Complex ==
This part was established in 1914. > WHEEL SHOP (SHOP NO-20), > EMU CORROSION REPAIR SHOP (SHOP NO-17), > ICF CORROSION REPAIR SHOP (SHOP NO- 18), > PAINT SHOP (SHOP NO-19) > BLACKSMITH SHOP (SHOP NO-24) > BOGIE REPAIR SHOP (SHOP NO-25) > ELECTRICAL SHOP (SHOP NO-26) > PLUMBING SHOP (SHOP NO-27) > MECHANICAL TRANSPORT SHOP (SHOP NO-33)

== Halisahar Stores Depot ==
It is headed by Deputy Chief Material Manager, an Indian Railway Stores Service officer.

== Kanchrapara Railway Hospital ==
It is headed by Chief Medical Superintendent.

== Performance Figures ==
Product		00-01	01-02	02-03	03-04	04-05	05-06	06-07	07-08	08-09	09-10	10-11	11-12	12-13	13-14	14-15	15-16	16-17	17-18
Loco	T	69	78	72	77	72	78	78	90	82	71	72	72	78	79	92	98	97	100
Loco	A	74	76	69	72	72	75	76	74	75	72	78	72	75	84	96	104	101	101
EMU	T		744	828	900	936	903	936	960	1080	993	996	1008	1080	1139	1164	1356	1419	1444
EMU	A	690	742	821	839	881	890	917	912	896	1000	993	1008	1073	1207	1328	1472	1393	1407
DEMU	T							30	33	18	15	54	40	76	68	77	99	100	88
DEMU	A	6	4	14	2	20	30	30	11	24	17	32	25	56	51	46	86	36	82
ICF	T		444	420	528	540	526	537	513	480	504	480	480	480	480	480	540	540	540
ICF	A	395	424	475	464	514	533	543	507	491	502	480	480	467	473	506	544	541	542
Armature	T		336	336	336	360	408	408	360		492	492	492	478	445	475	520	510	506
Armature	A	331	345	313	393	324	350	350	258	254	272	308	304	330	377	412	426	483	506
Manpower		12423	12159	11782	11490	11220	10933	10649	10255	10121	9760	9610	9255	9139	9522	9219	8828	8372	8128

== Supervisors' Training Centre ==
It is headed by Vice Principal (an Assistant Scale officer). Apart from supervisors, it also imparts training to technicians.

== Notable Achievements ==
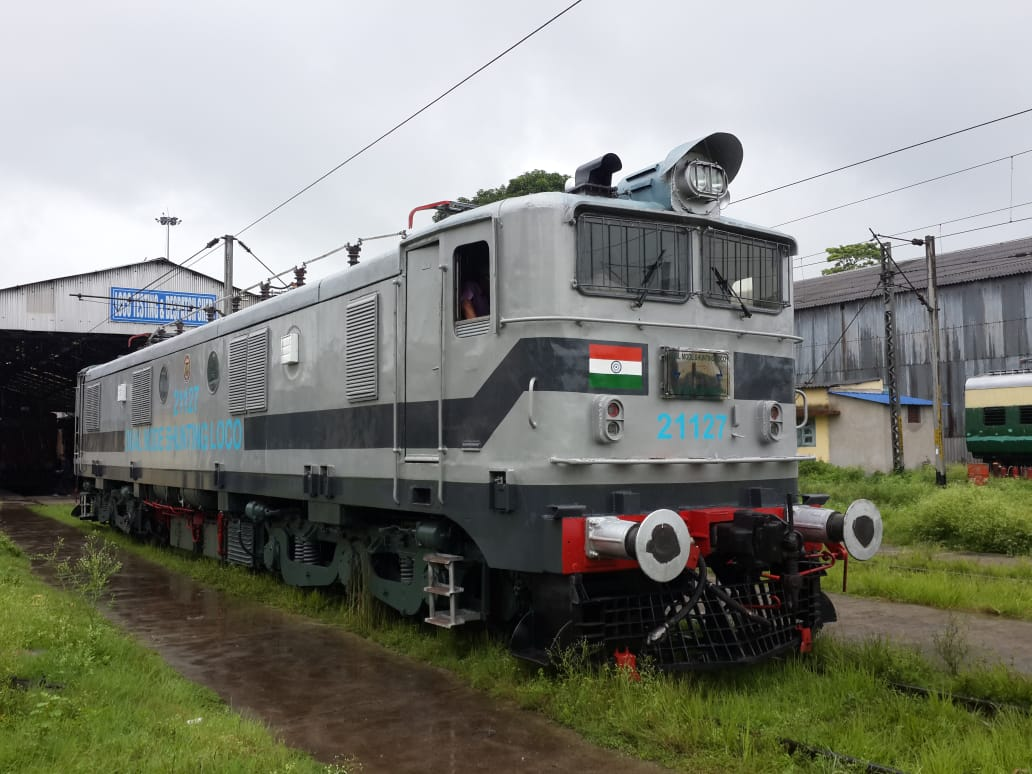
Dual Mode Shunting Loco.

- Dual Mode Shunting Loco.
- 25 kV CUM Battery Operated Shunting Car,
- Self Powered Inspection Car.
- Self Powered Medical Relief Van.

== Certifications ==
1. ISO 9001 in September 2005
2. ISO 14001 in March, 2018
3. OHSAS 18001 in March, 2018
4. ISO 3834 (Welding Quality Assurance) in Jan 2018.
5. ISO 50001 in June 2018
6. 5-S on selective shops since December 2017 (Shop 2A,11,17).

== Clubs/Welfare Institutes ==
=== Railway Officers' Club ===
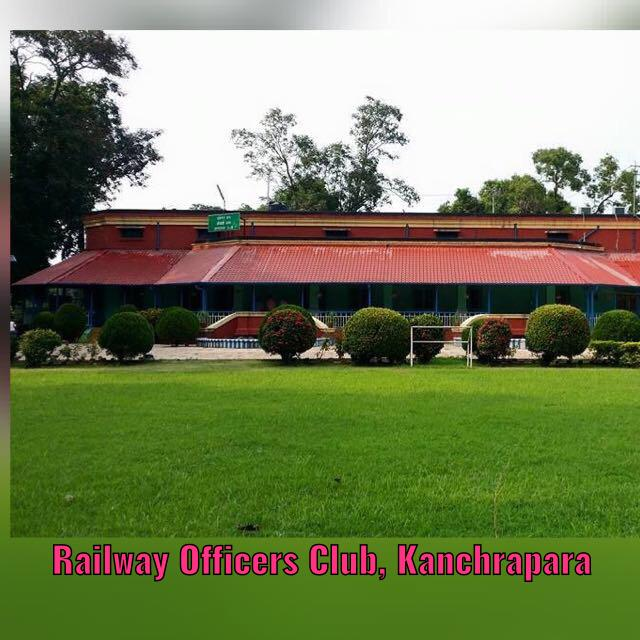
Railway Officers' Club

It is primarily meant for conferences and railway cultural events. It includes sports facilities like Lawn Tennis (turf), Badminton (wooden court), Billiards, swimming pool, etc. for railway employees only. The halls and open spaces are also open for public booking.

Officers' Rest House is a part of it and can be used by any officer of Govt. of India for official/private purpose.

Apart from Railway Officers' Club, various other institute with sports and cultural facilities have been established by railways.

=== Bell Institute ===
It includes Football ground, Badminton Court, Cultural hall, etc. It is open for public booking.

=== Kazi Nazrul Institute ===
It is used largely for cultural events etc. It is open for public booking.

=== Khudiram Bose Institute ===
It includes Football ground and auditorium for cultural events. It is open for public booking.

Establishment of KPA Workshop
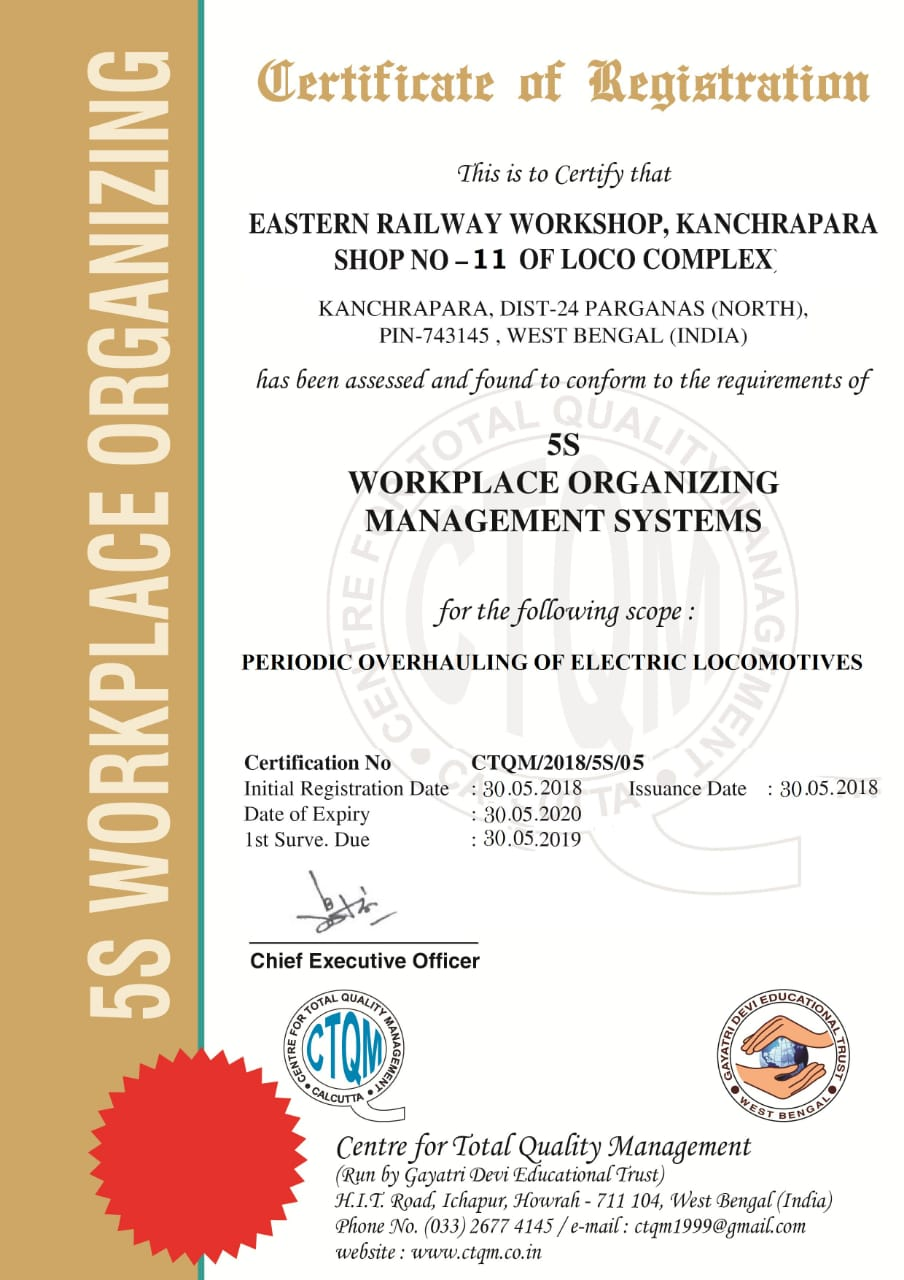
5S certificate for POH of Electric Locomotives, SHOP 11

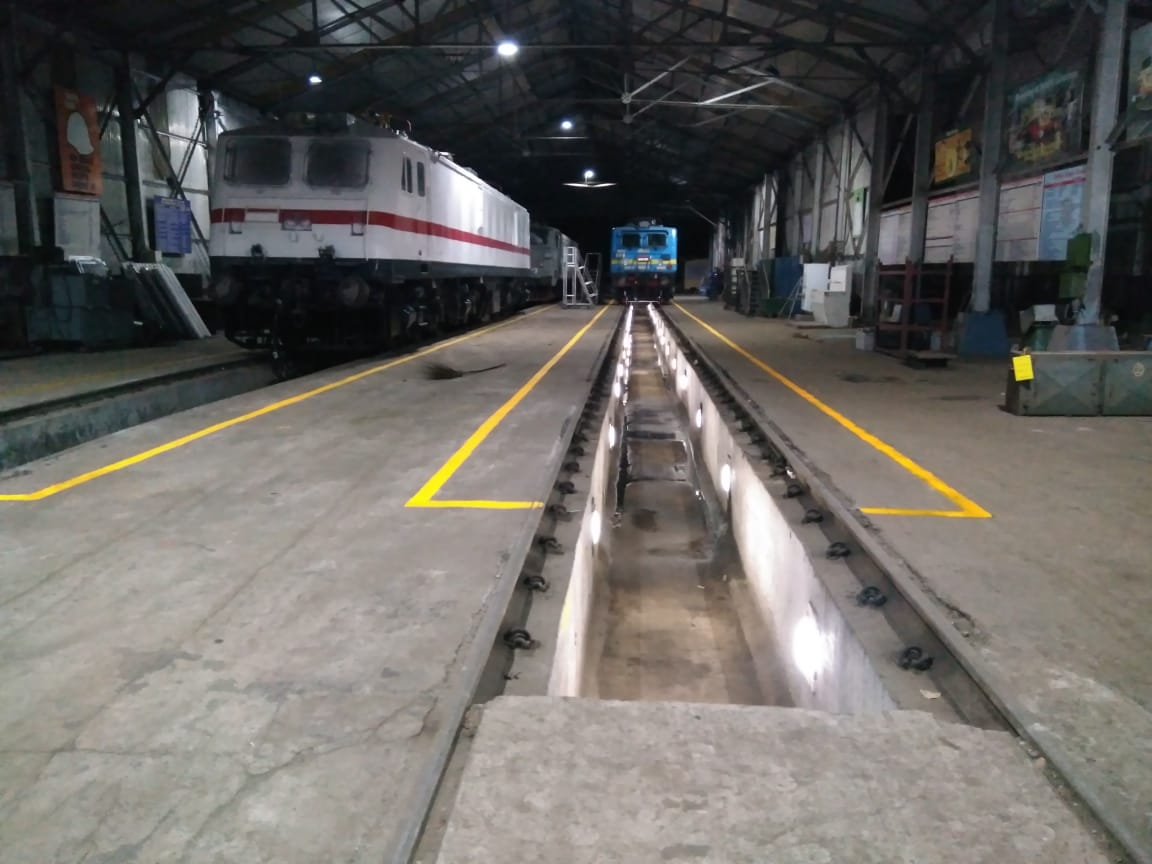
Electric Loco Testing Shed

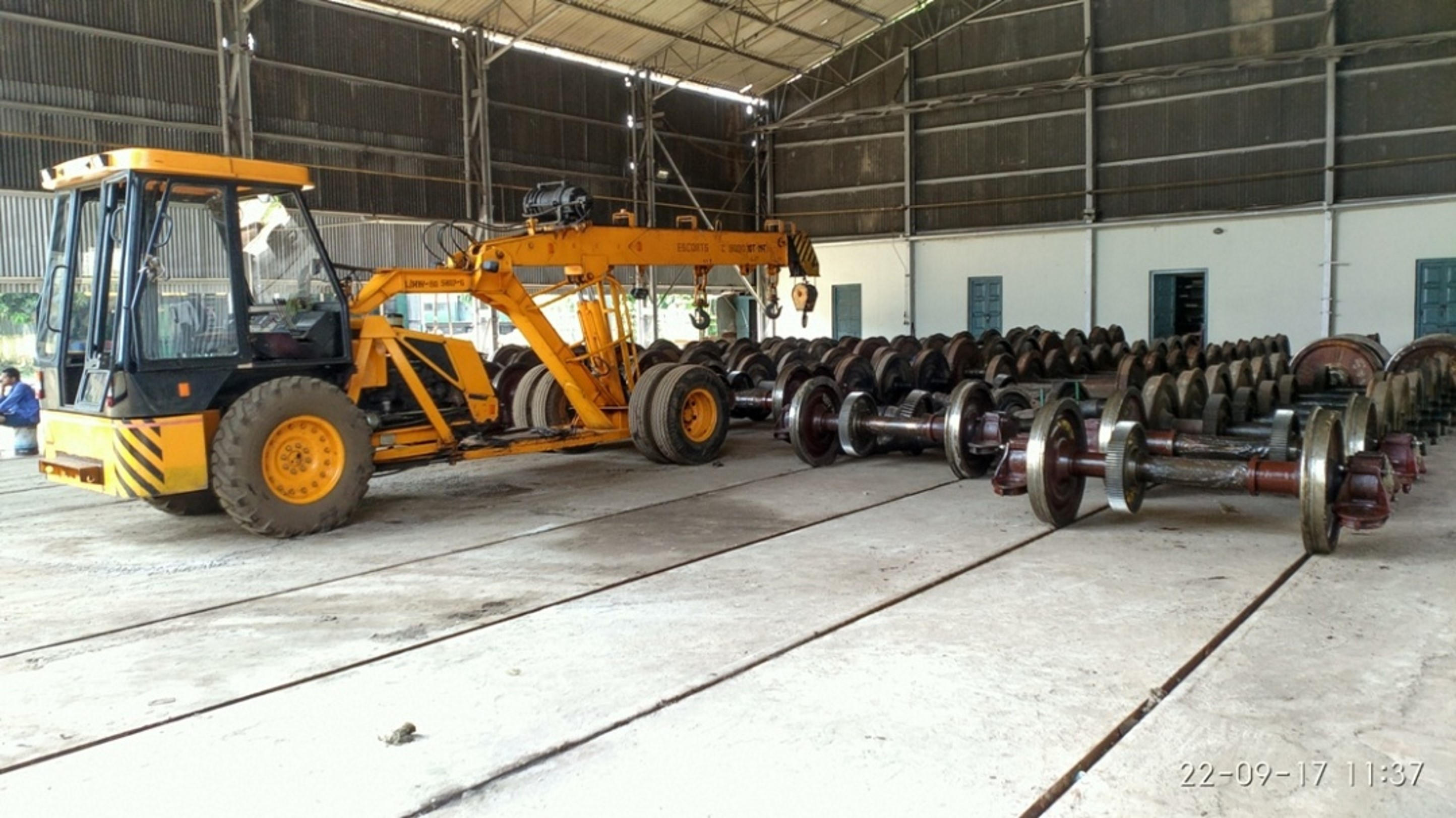
Wheel Park

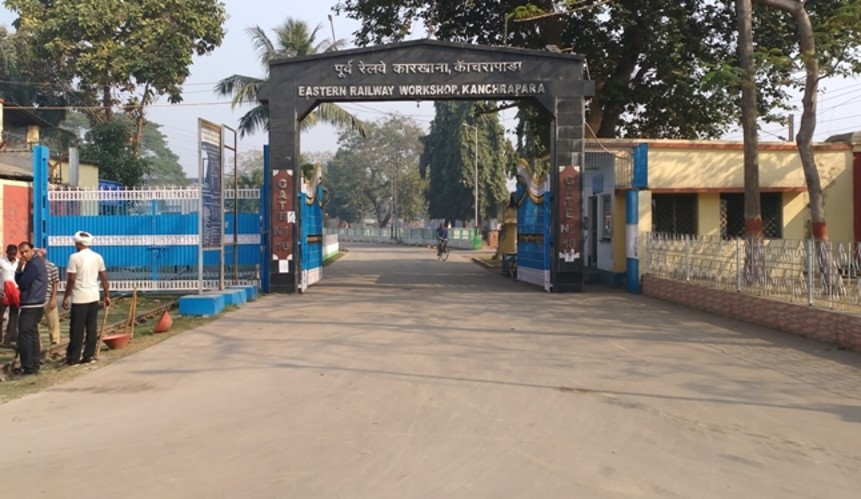
Officers' Gate (Gate 18, loco complex)
