= Patuli floating market =

Floating market in Kolkata, India

- পাটুলি ভাসমান বাজার
- Location: Patuli, Kolkata, India
- Developer: Kolkata Metropolitan Development Authority
- Num. of stores: ~200
- Public transit: Shahid Khudiram Metro Station

Patuli floating market is an artificial floating market in Patuli, Kolkata, India, developed by Kolkata Metropolitan Development Authority. Developed at a cost of ₹10 Crores, beside the canal adjacent to the Eastern Metropolitan Bypass, the market was inaugurated in January 2018, and was an instant success.

== History ==
The market was opened in January 2018 with 112 boats and around 200 stores. The market was developed with a cost of ₹6 crores and 4 crores was spent to build an underground sewer network. Two water bodies were merged and equipped with waterproof wooden walkways, wooden beams and wooden pavements for the buyers and shopkeepers to reach the boats.

The market was a success after opening. But from May 2020, after Amphan storm, the market started to decline. 90 percent of all boats or shops had been shut. In October 2020, major renovation work started. 57 boats were restored in first phrase and then after phrase II, around 100 boats were in the market. ₹3 Crore was spent for renovation work by Government of West Bengal.

The lighting used by the municipal authorities and shopkeepers is reported to have driven away migratory birds from the region.

== The market ==
As of 2020, the market has around 100 boats and more than 200 vendors (shops). The water body is spread in 24,000 square meters, 500m long and 60m wide adjacent to Eastern Metropolitan Bypass. There are four separate zones: fish, meat, vegetables and fruits zone. Each boat has two shops and the shopkeepers sell vegetables, fruits, flowers, fish, meat, fast food, tea, etc. But due to more tourist footfall and fewer buyers, the sales are declining (as of 2020).
