= Kolkata Bus Rapid Transit System =

Bus service in Kolkata, India

Kolkata BRTS
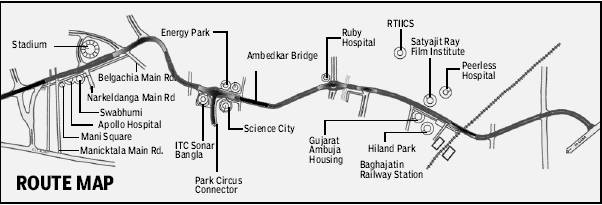
- Kolkata BRTS route

Overview
- Locale: Kolkata
- Transit type: Bus rapid transit
- Number of lines: 1

Technical
- System length: 15.5 kilometres (9.6 mi)

Kolkata Bus Rapid Transit System, commonly abbreviated as Kolkata BRTS, is a proposed bus rapid transit system taken up by KMDA. Beginning at Ultadanga, the route will cover 15.5 km running along the E M Bypass to Garia. The corridor connects major growth centres like Ultadanga, Salt Lake, Tangra Metropolitan, Anandapur, Mukundapur and Patuli township.

As of February 2022, work has not been completed with no updates from authorities. A decade's worth of no advancement or updates suggests that this project was terminated in its initial stages. The BRTS seems to have been overshadowed by its more glamorous kin — the metro.

== Corridors ==
The route was slated to cover places such as Ultadanga, the Kakurgachi access to EM Bypass, Apollo Hospital, the Phoolbagan access to EM Bypass, Salt Lake Stadium, Beliaghata, Chingrihata, Metropolitan, Mathpukur, Science City, Panchanangram, VIP Bazar, Tagore Park, Ruby Hospital, Mandir Para, Prince Anwar Shah Road, Singhabari, Mukundapur, Ajoy Nagar, Peerless Hospital, Patuli Ghosh Para, Baishnavghata-Patuli and Dhalai Bridge, Kumarkhali. Key junctions include Chingrihata, Paroma Island, Ruby Hospital and Prince Anwar Shah Road.

== Alignment ==
The BRTS lane is proposed to be integrated with the E M Bypass.

== Design speed ==
The speed design for the BRTS corridor is proposed to be around 50 km/h.

== Integration of BRTS with other transits ==
The BRTS is proposed to be integrated with different modes of transits already existing or under construction or proposed for the city.

== Project status ==
=== 2011 ===
March: Union Urban Development ministry clears proposal for the project. IVRCL is awarded the contract.

=== 2014 ===
July: Not much progress as of now. Public estimated completion date 2018. No project plan made public by government.

=== 2017 ===
January: Widening of roads are happening in some places. No major progress has been done so far. Metro work in E M Bypass can delay the progress.

== See also ==
- Kolkata Metropolitan Development Authority
