= Air Force Station Kanchrapara =

RAF Kanchrapara Kanchrapara Airstrip
- IATA: none; ICAO: VBKP

Summary
- Airport type: Military
- Owner: Indian Air Force
- Location: Kanchrapara, North 24 Parganas district, India
- Elevation AMSL: 32 ft / 10 m
- Coordinates: 22°55′22″N 088°27′35″E

Map
- Location of the airport in West Bengal Kanchrapara AFS (India)

Runways
Direction	Length		Surface
Direction	m	ft	Surface
15/33	1,500	4,921	Concrete

Air Force Station Kanchrapara is a military airfield located near Kanchrapara, in the North 24 Parganas district in West Bengal, India.

== History ==
Air Force Station Kanchrapara was established on September 1, 1942. During September–c. 4 October 1945 World War II, the airfield was used as a reconnaissance base by the 8th Reconnaissance Group of The United States Army Air Forces Tenth Air Force. It was home to several P-51 Mustang, B-25 Mitchell and P-38 Lightning airframes during that time. After World War II, this airstrip was closed and left abandoned.

The airfield was re-activated in December 2014, when the Indian Air Force inaugurated its 5th Selection Board at the Air Force Station. An old MIG-21 has been brought here for a showcase, it can be seen from the main gate.

== See also ==
- List of airports by ICAO code: V#VA VE VI VO - India
- List of airports in India
- List of airports in West Bengal
