= Bager Mosque =

Mosque in West Bengal, India

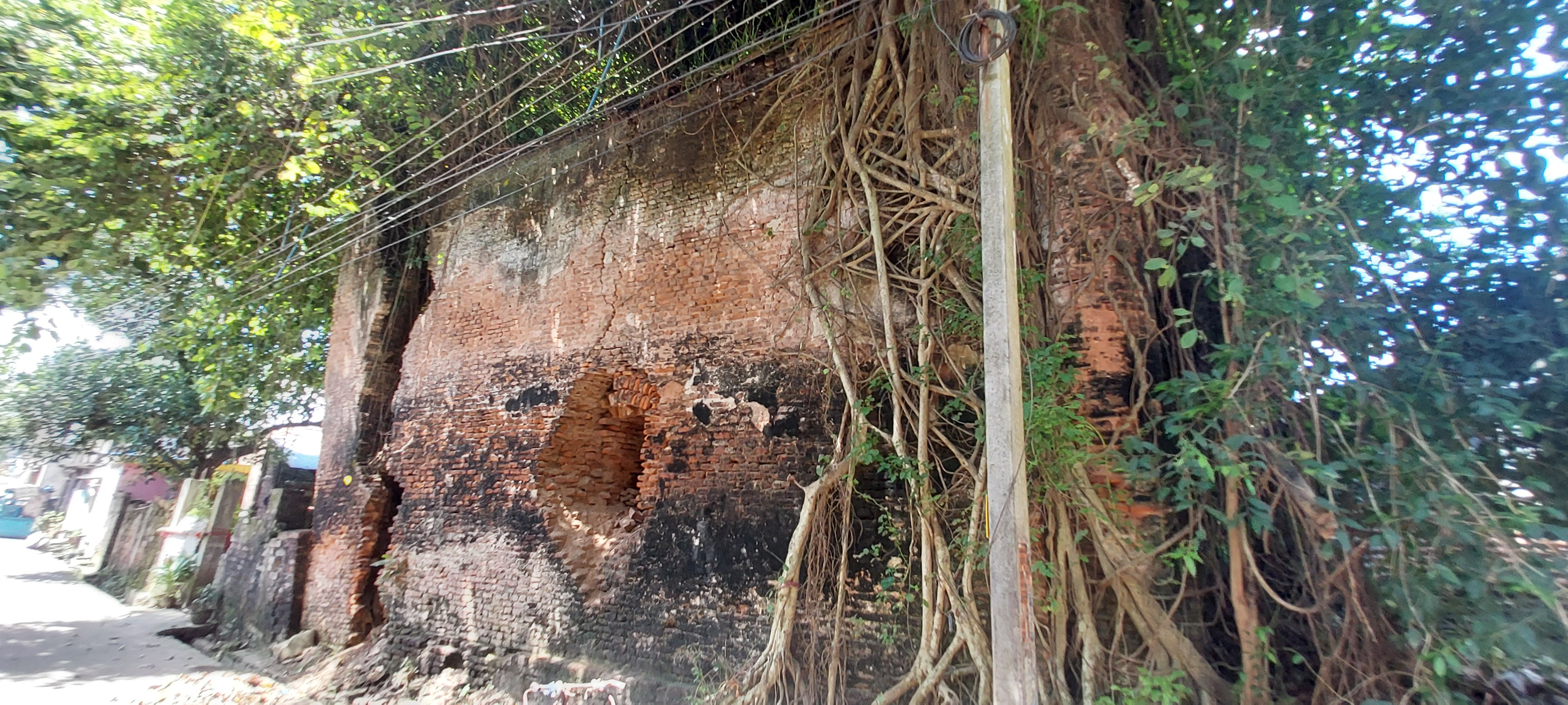

Religion
- Affiliation: Islam

Location
- State: West Bengal
- Country: India

Architecture
- Type: mosque

Bager Mosque is a heritage mosque situated at Bager more, Kanchrapara in North 24 Parganas district in the Indian state of West Bengal. It is the oldest surviving medieval Islamic monuments of the district.

== History ==
The area around the mosque was known as Mallik Bag and the name comes from Malek Barkhordar, who was also known as Mallik Saheb. The mosque is locally known as Bager Masjid, built in 1686 with terracotta ornamentation. The original foundation stone of the mosque is on display at Kanchrapara Municipality Museum.

== Gallery ==
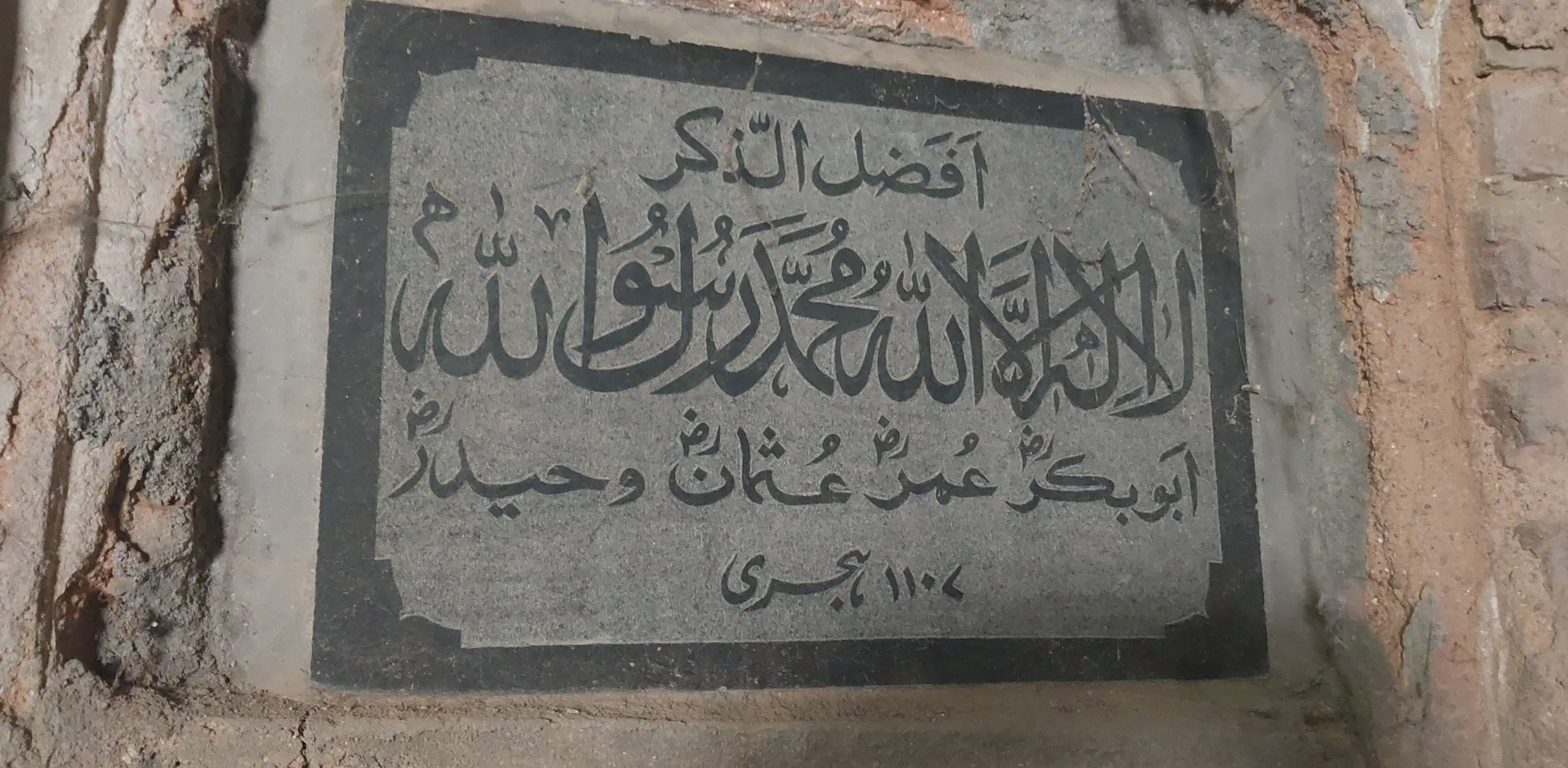

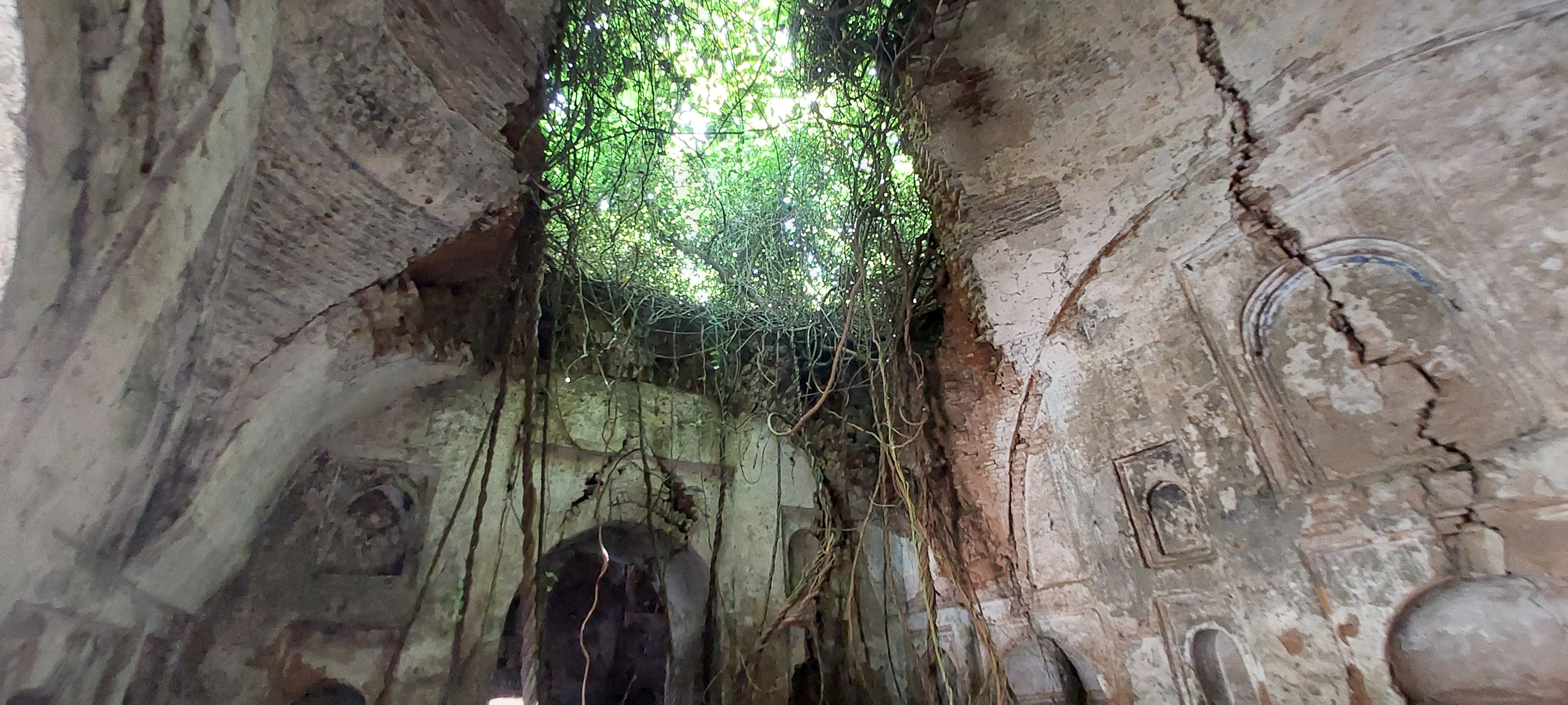

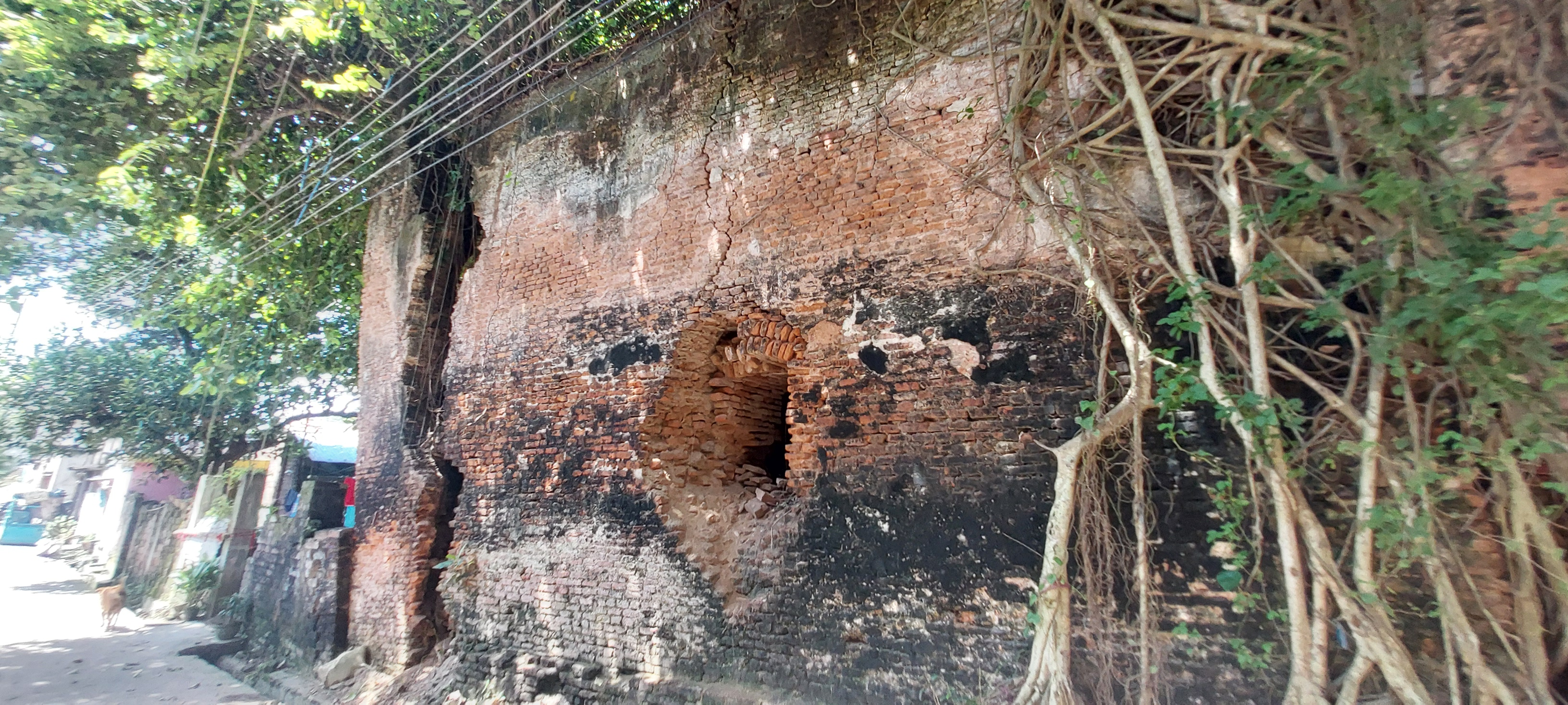

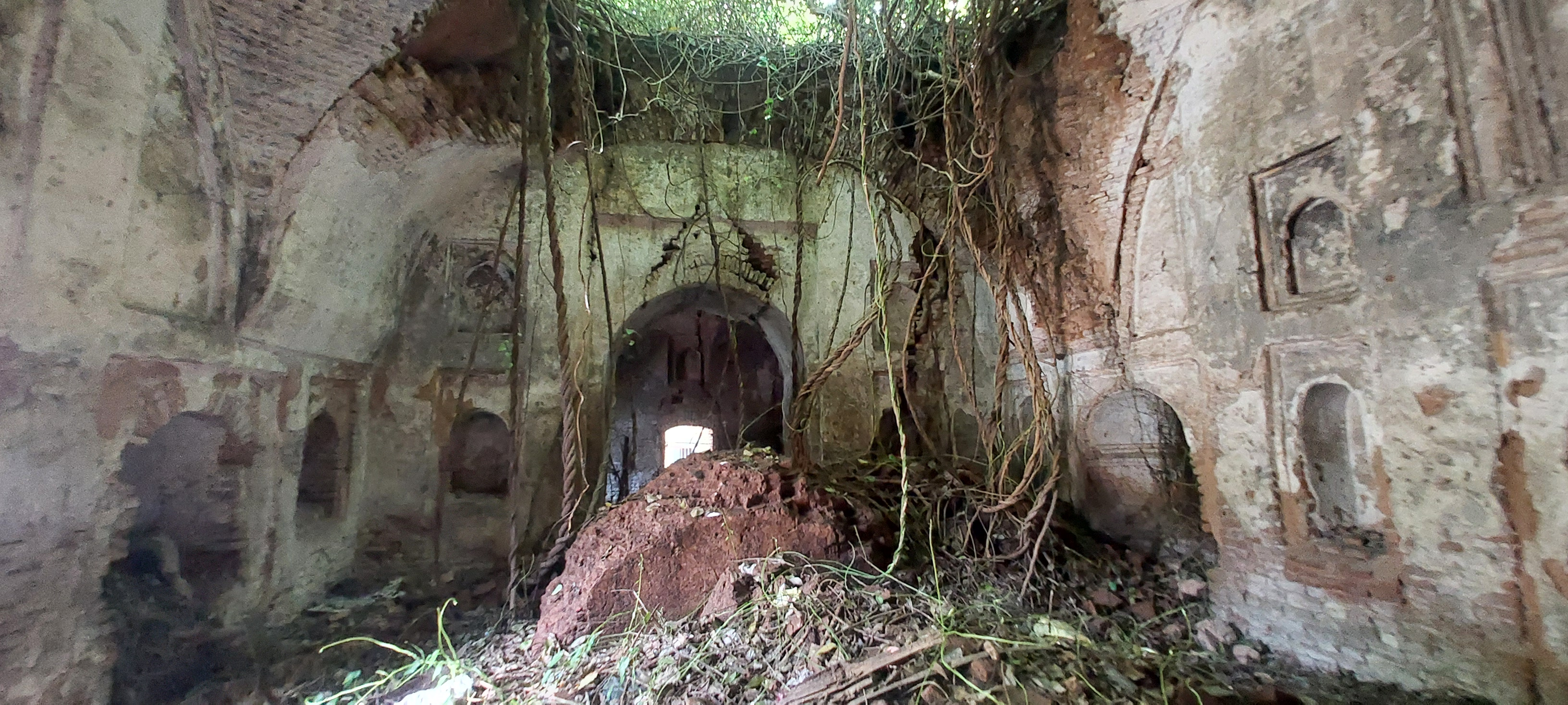
