= Hooghly Riverfront =

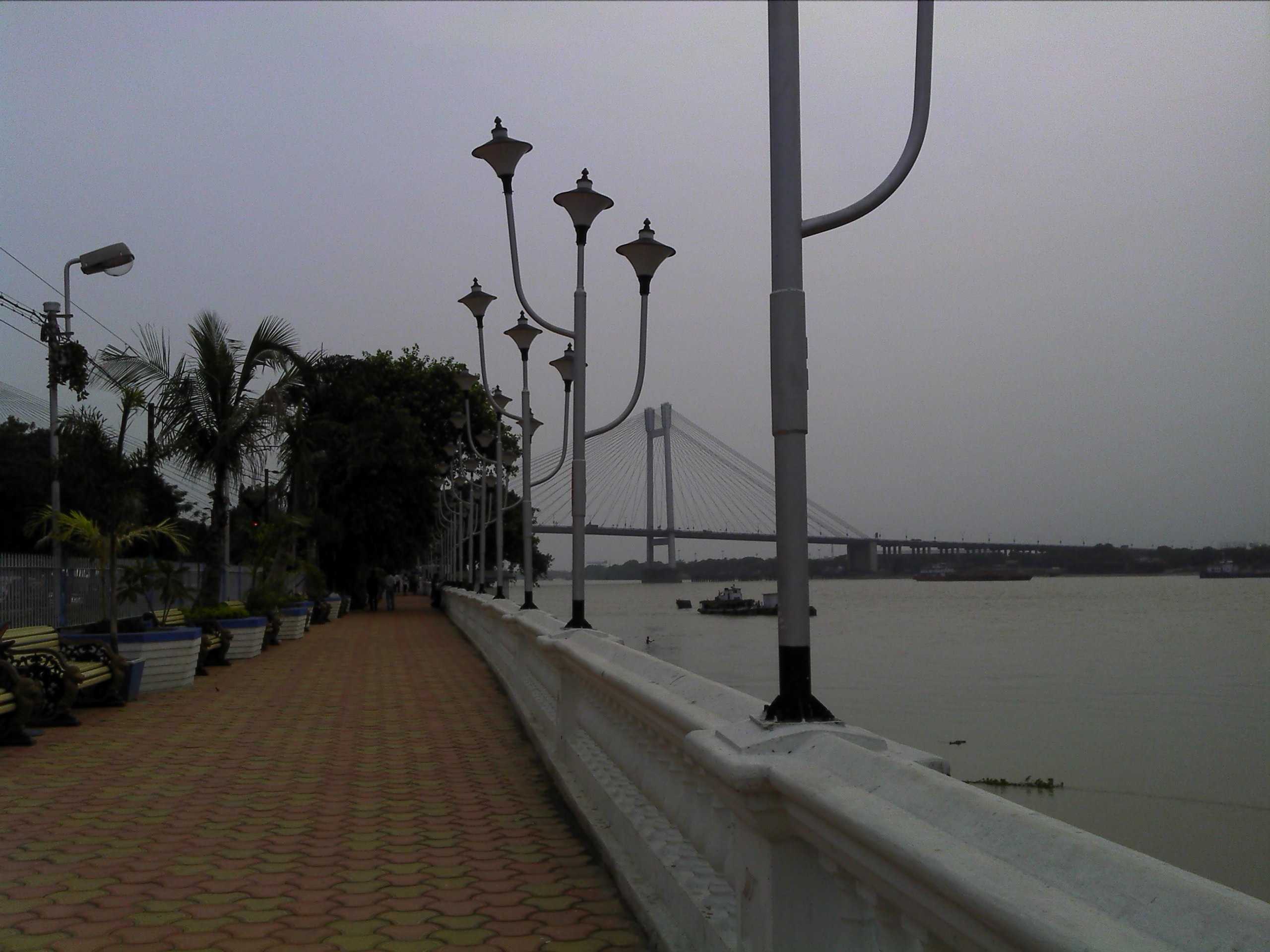
Hoogly Riverfront in Kolkata in 2012, after Development Phase 1

Hooghly Riverfront is composed of the two banks of the Hooghly River, which runs between the city of Kolkata on the east and the city of Howrah on the west in West Bengal, India. On the east bank of the river, a beautification started in 2011, of which the first phase ended in 2012.

== History ==
The banks of the Hooghly River (West Bengal, India) housed the trading posts of the British, French, Portuguese, Dutch and Danish in the 17th to 19th centuries. Later, large jute mills were built, and industrialisation started. With the reduction in the port activity, a decline in the jute industry and a change in political dynamics, the riverfront was further neglected. The once-grand warehouses, temples, ghats, and river-facing houses are in need of restoration.

People visit it in the evenings on weekends to go boating on the river, stroll along the bank and purchase food from stalls there. One stall selling ice-cream and fast food has been there for more than 40 years. A 2-kilometre (1.2 mi) stretch of the beautified riverfront from Prinsep Ghat to Babughat (Baje Kadamtala Ghat) was inaugurated on 24 May 2012. It has illuminated and landscaped gardens and pathways, fountains and renovated ghats. One of the songs in the Bollywood film Parineeta was shot here on the ghats.

The riverfront includes Millennium Park, a millennium gift from the Kolkata Metropolitan Development Authority (KMDA/CMDA) that was inaugurated on 26 December 1999. The park was part of the first phase of the Kolkata Riverside Beautification Project.
