= Kolkata Metropolitan Development Authority =

Metropolitan Authority for the development of Kolkata and its suburbs

- Official Logo of CMDA (now KMDA)

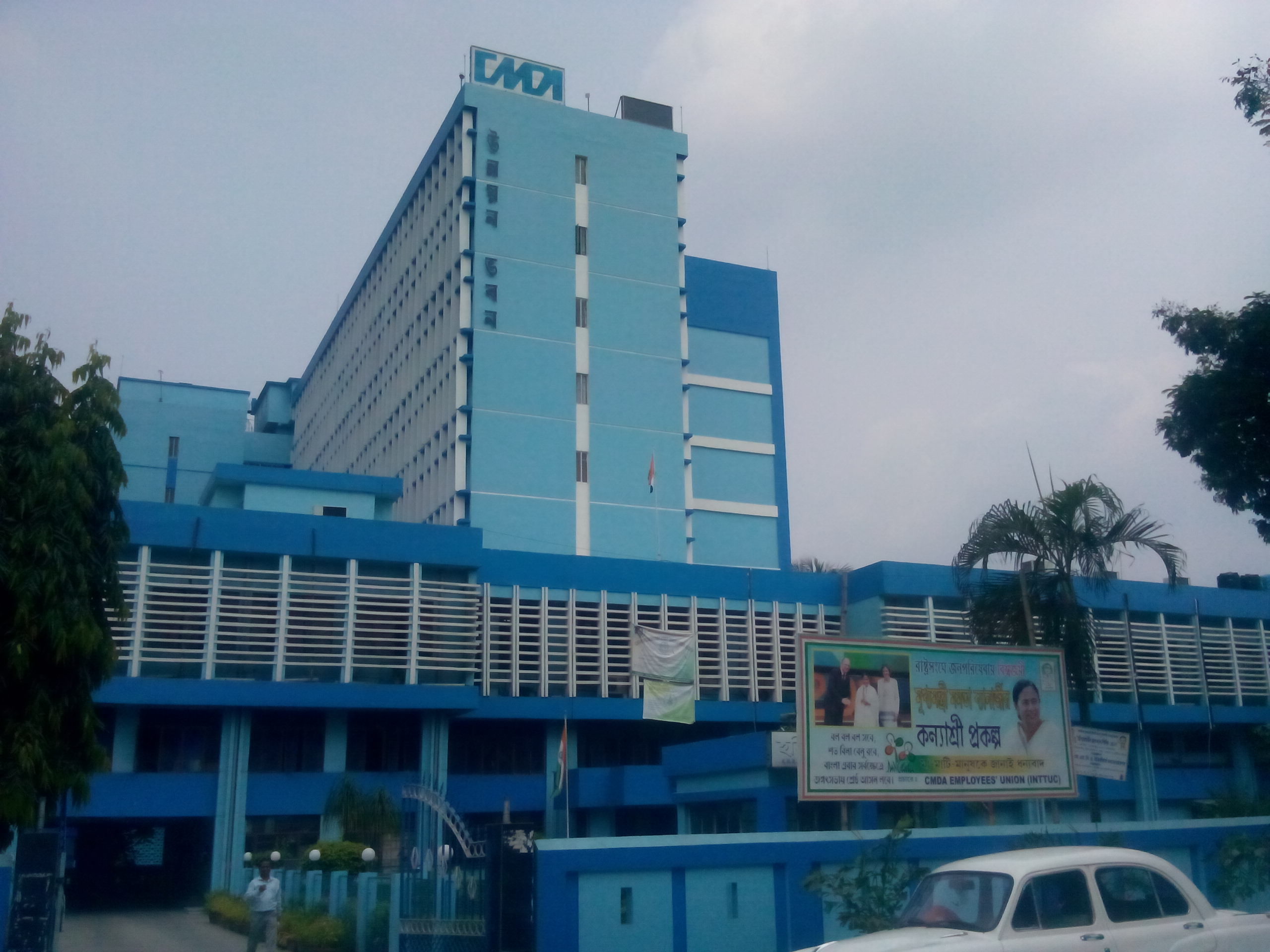
- CMDA (now KMDA) head offices

Agency overview
- Formed: 1970; 56 years ago
- Type: City Planning Agency
- Jurisdiction: Government of West Bengal
- Headquarters: Unnayan Bhavan, Bidhannagar, Kolkata-700091
- Minister responsible: Minister-In-Charge Department of Urban Development and Municipal Affairs
- Agency executive: Chief Executive Officer
- Website: kmda.wb.gov.in

Kolkata Metropolitan Development Authority (KMDA) is the statutory planning and development authority for the Kolkata metropolitan area in the Indian state of West Bengal. The organisation was known as Calcutta Metropolitan Development Authority (CMDA) and retains its previous logo. KMDA is functioning under the administrative control of Department of Urban Development and Municipal Affairs of Government of West Bengal.

== Functions ==
KMDA's role is multi-disciplinary: it is the agency of city planning, it sculpts new areas and townships, it develops physical infrastructure as well as provide basic services like water, drainage, waste management. KMDA is also the Technical Secretariat to Kolkata Metropolitan Planning Committee (KMPC). Besides these major functional areas, KMDA is also engaged in providing consultancy services and implementing projects on behalf of other public sector departments and agencies.

== History ==
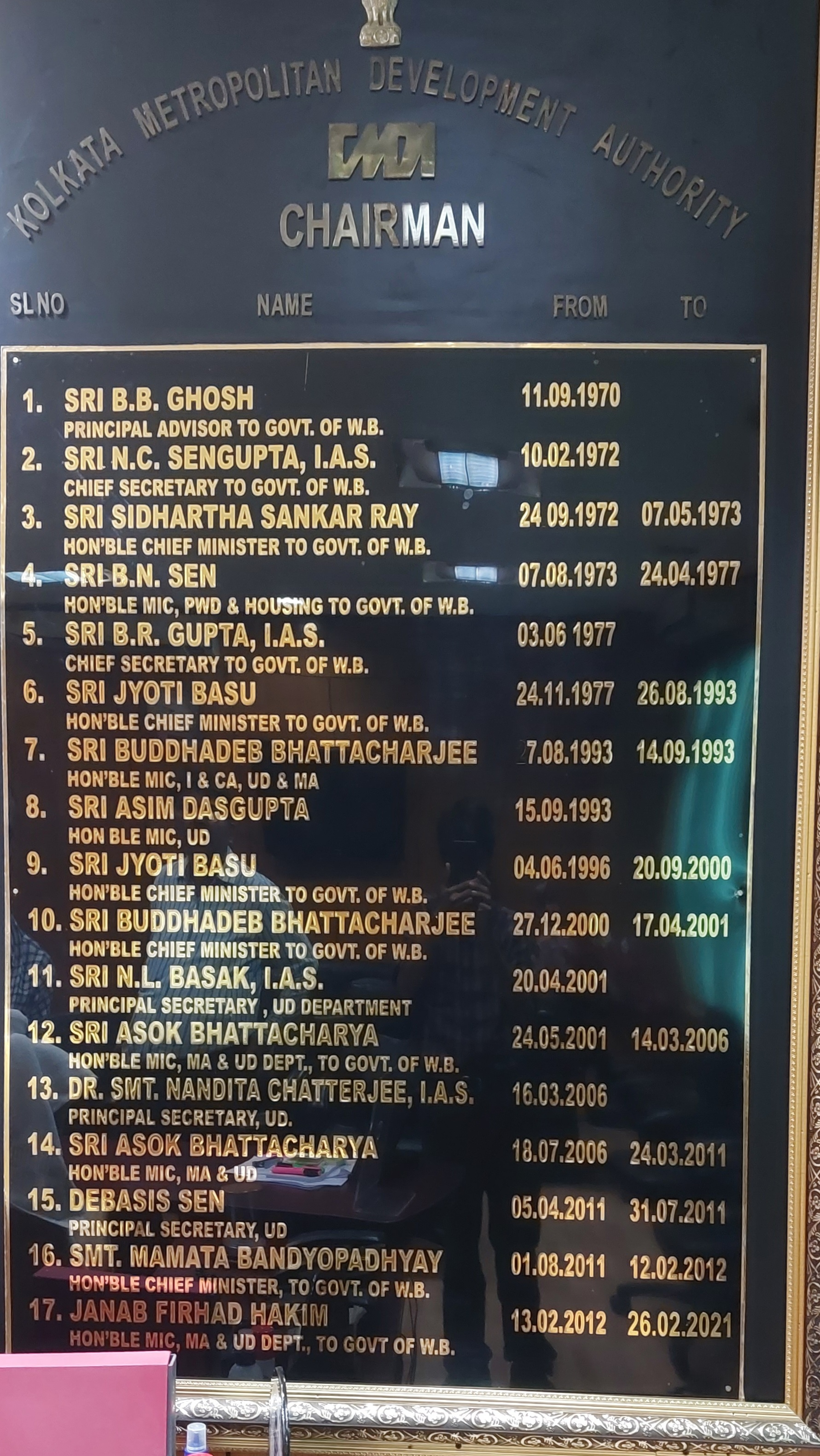
List of the Chairmans of KMDA

The organisation was formed under a Presidential Ordinance in 1970. It works now under provision of the West Bengal Town and Country (Planning & Development) Act, 1979. Its Planning Directorate was set up in 1974.

== Governance ==
KMDA has an 11-member Board that includes both elected peoples' representatives and nominated bureaucrats. The Honourable Minister-in-charge of Urban Development and Municipal Affairs in the Government of West Bengal is the ex-officio Chairman of the Board of KMDA.

== Jurisdiction ==
Jurisdiction
Settlements	Name	Total
Municipal Corporations	Kolkata, Bidhannagar, Howrah, Chandannagar	4
Municipalities	1. North 24 Parganas district; Baranagar, Barasat, Barrackpore, Bhatpara, Dum Dum, Garulia, Halisahar, Kamarhati, Kanchrapara, Khardah, Madhyamgram, Naihati, New Barrackpore, North Barrackpur, North Dumdum, Panihati, South Dumdum, Titagarh: 2. South 24 Parganas district; Baruipur, Budge Budge, Jaynagar Majilpur, Maheshtala, Pujali, Rajpur Sonarpur: 3. Nadia district; Gayespur, Haringhata, Kalyani: 4. Howrah district; Uluberia: 5. Hooghly district; Baidyabati, Bhadreswar, Bansberia, Champdani, Dankuni, Hugli Chuchura, Konnagar, Rishra, Serampore, Uttarpara Kotrung	38

== Notable projects ==
Development	Location	Start date	Completion date	References
Patuli floating market	Patuli		2018	
Baishnabghata Patuli Township	Garia			
Bediapara Underpass	South Dumdum			
Dakshineswar Skywalk	Dakshineswar	2015	2018	
Kolkata Bus Rapid Transit System	Ultadanga - E. M. Bypass - Garia	2011	ongoing	
Kolkata Eye	Hooghly Riverfront	2011	Never started	
Kolkata West International City	Howrah	2006	ongoing	
Millennium Park	Strand Road		1999	
Nazrul Mancha	Rabindra Sarobar		1980	
Panihati Intake Jetty	Panihati		2014	
Maa Flyover	E.M. Bypass - Park Circus	2010	2015	
Storm Water Drainage Systems	Dum Dum			
West Bengal Tele Academy Complex	Baruipur		2022	
40 MGD Water Treatment Plant	Maheshtala		2024	

== See also ==
- Siliguri Jalpaiguri Development Authority
