= Prinsep Ghat =

Ghat of Kolkata, West Bengal, India

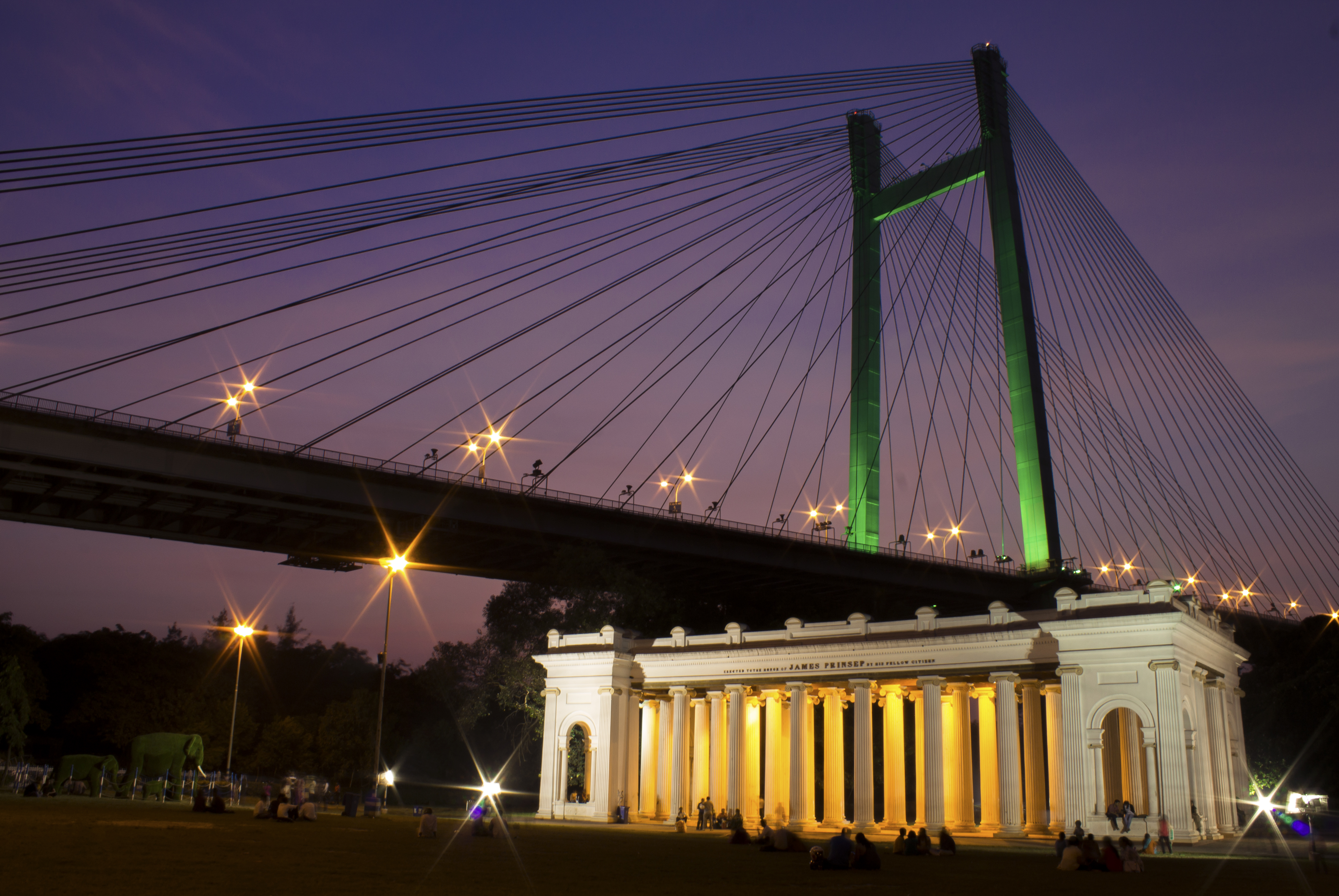
- A view of Princep Ghat in the evening, with the Vidyasagar Setu bridge visible behind it
- Interactive map of the Prinsep Ghat area

General information
- Location: Hastings, Kolkata, West Bengal 700021, India
- Coordinates: 22°33′24.41″N 88°19′53.76″E

Princep Ghat is a ghat built in 1841 during the Company Raj, along the Kolkata bank of the Hooghly River in India. The Palladian porch in the memory of the eminent Anglo-Indian scholar and antiquary James Prinsep was designed by W. Fitzgerald and constructed in 1843.

Located between the Water Gate and the St George's Gate of the Vijay Durg, the monument to Prinsep is rich in Greek and Gothic inlays. It was first restored by INTACH, The Indian National Trust for Art and Cultural Heritage in 1993 and subsequently by the state's public works department in November 2001 and has since been well-maintained. In its initial years, all royal British entourages used the Prinsep Ghat jetty for embarkation and disembarkation.

Prinsep Ghat is one of the oldest recreational spots of Kolkata. People visit it in the evenings on weekends to go boating on the river, stroll along the bank and purchase food from stalls there. A 2-kilometre (1.2 mi) stretch of the beautified riverfront from Prinsep Ghat to Babughat (Baje Kadamtala Ghat) was inaugurated on 24 May 2012. It has illuminated and landscaped gardens and pathways, fountains and renovated ghats. A song in the Bollywood film Parineeta (2005) was shot here on the ghats.

The nearby Prinsep Ghat railway station is named after this ghat. The station is part of the Kolkata Circular Railway which is maintained by Eastern Railway. The station code is PPGT.

A jetty nearby, called the Man-O-War jetty, belongs to the Kolkata Port Trust and commemorates the role played by the port in the Second World War. The jetty is mainly used by the Indian Navy.

== Gallery ==
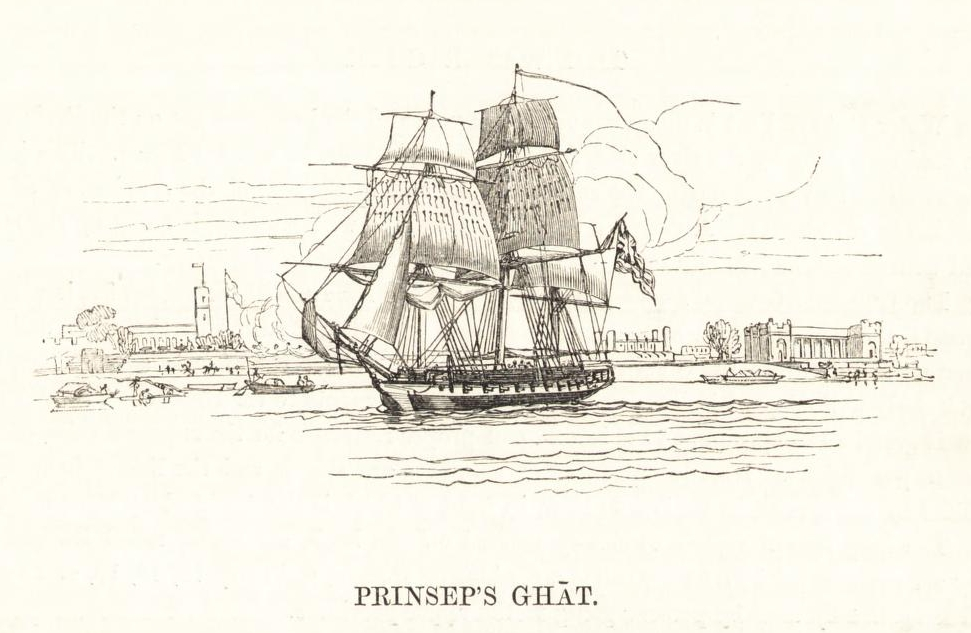
British Man of War alongside Prinsep Ghat ca 1853

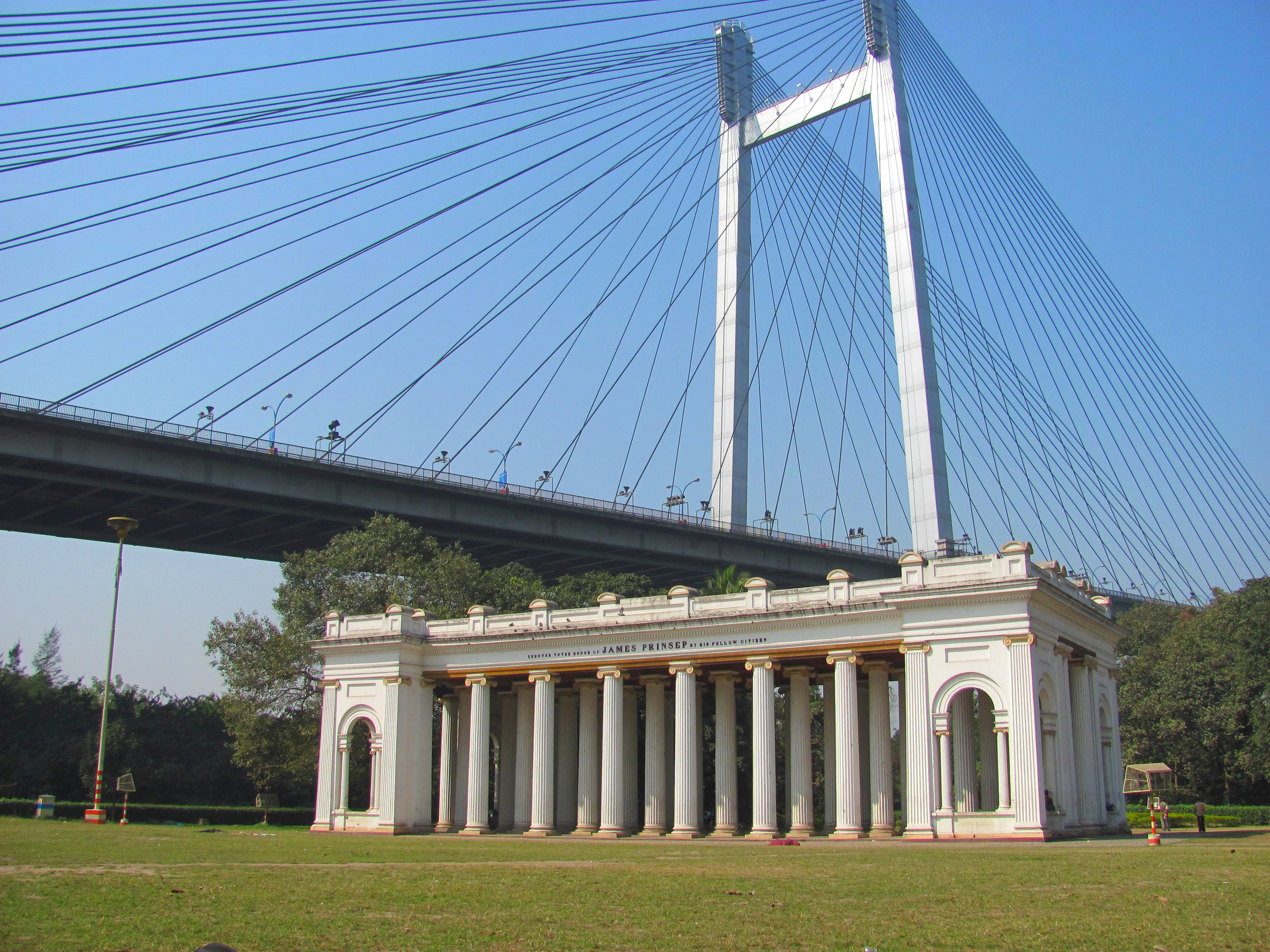
Prinsep ghat with the Vidyasagar Setu bridge in the daytime

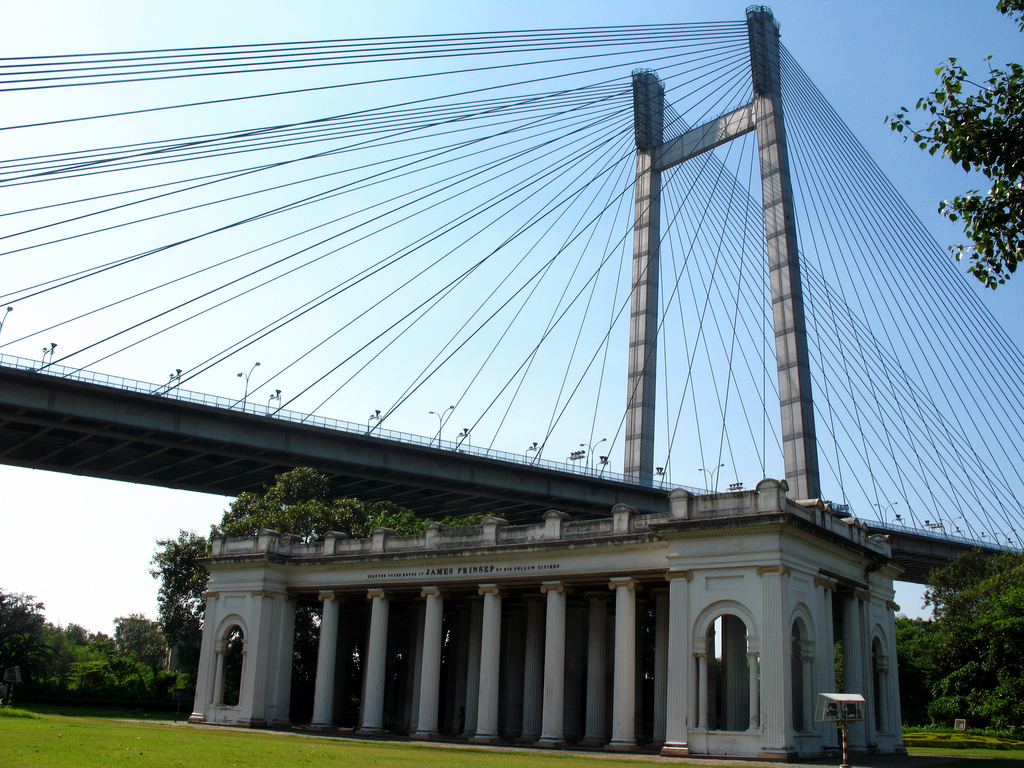
Prinsep memorial overlooked by Vidyasagar Setu

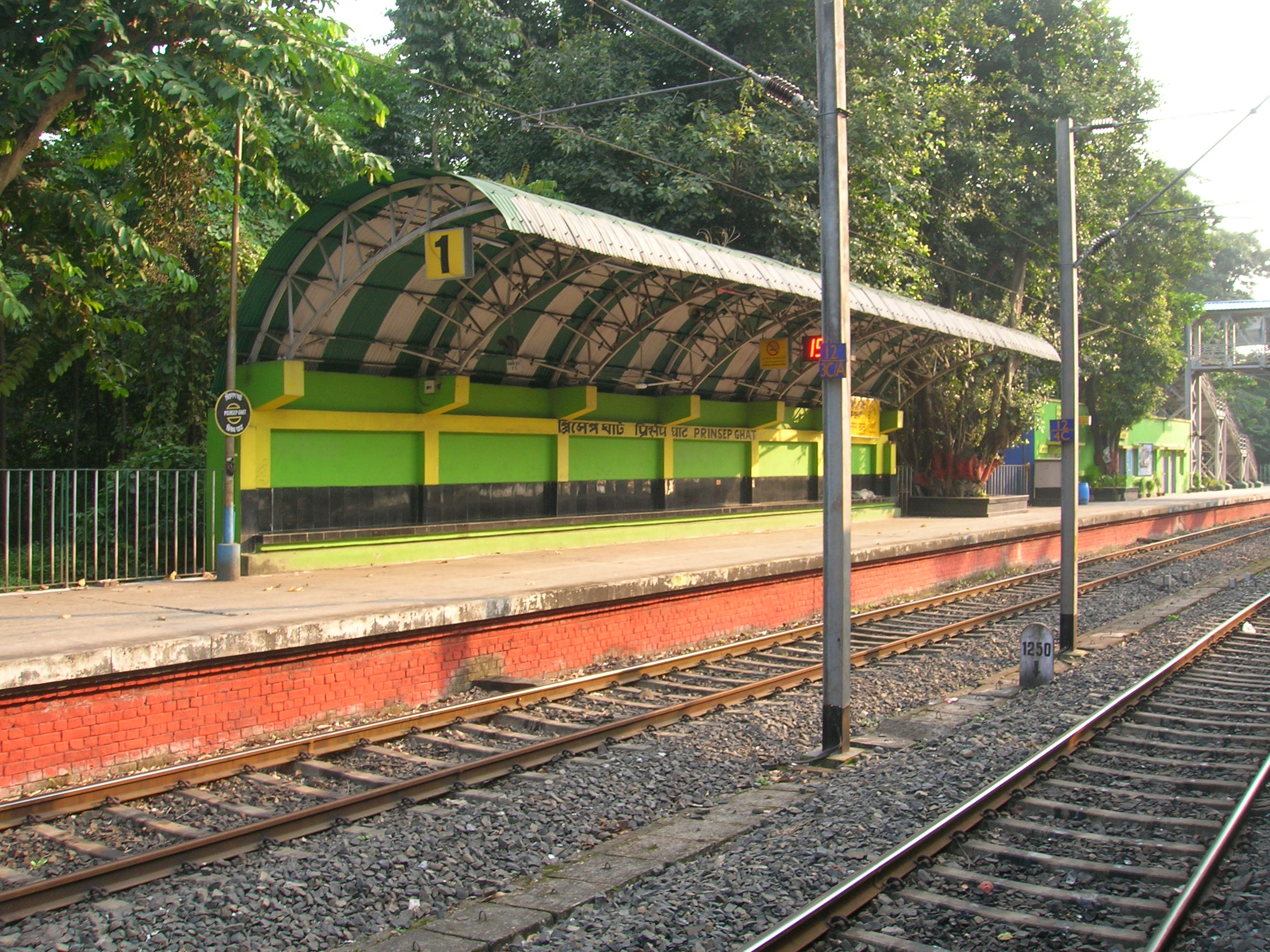
Prinsep Ghat railway station

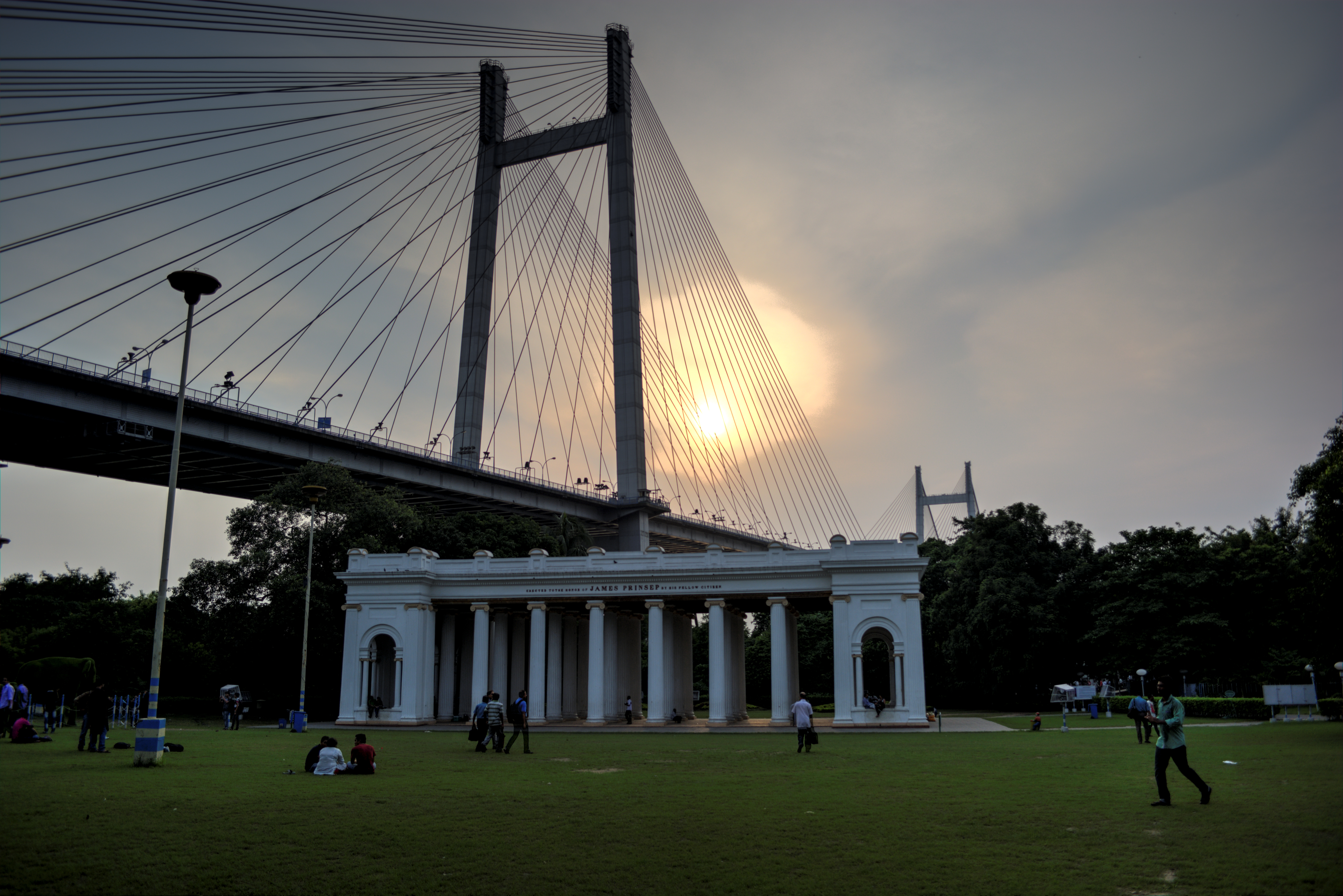
Princep Ghat in the evening

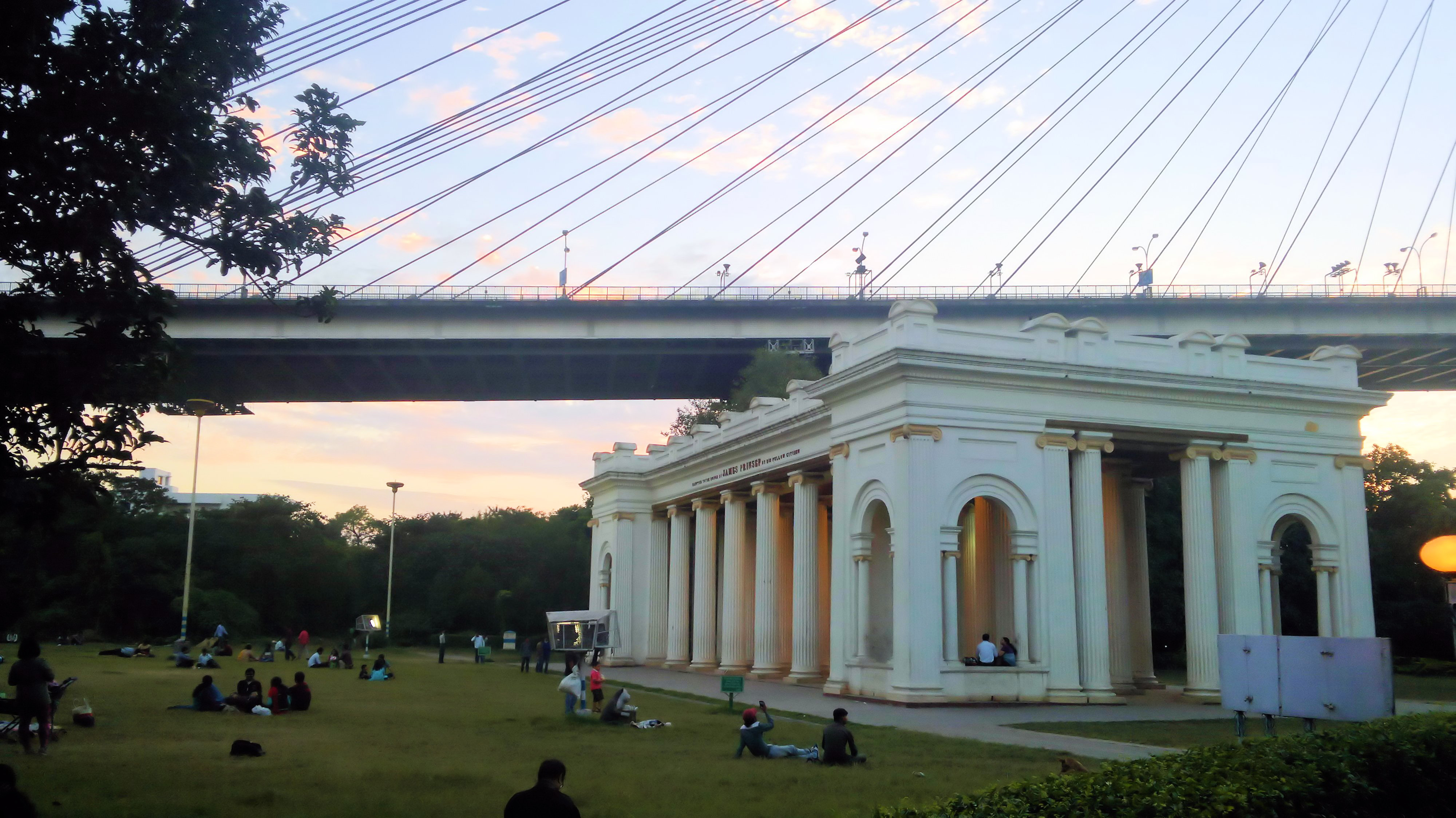
Evening view of Prinsep Ghat

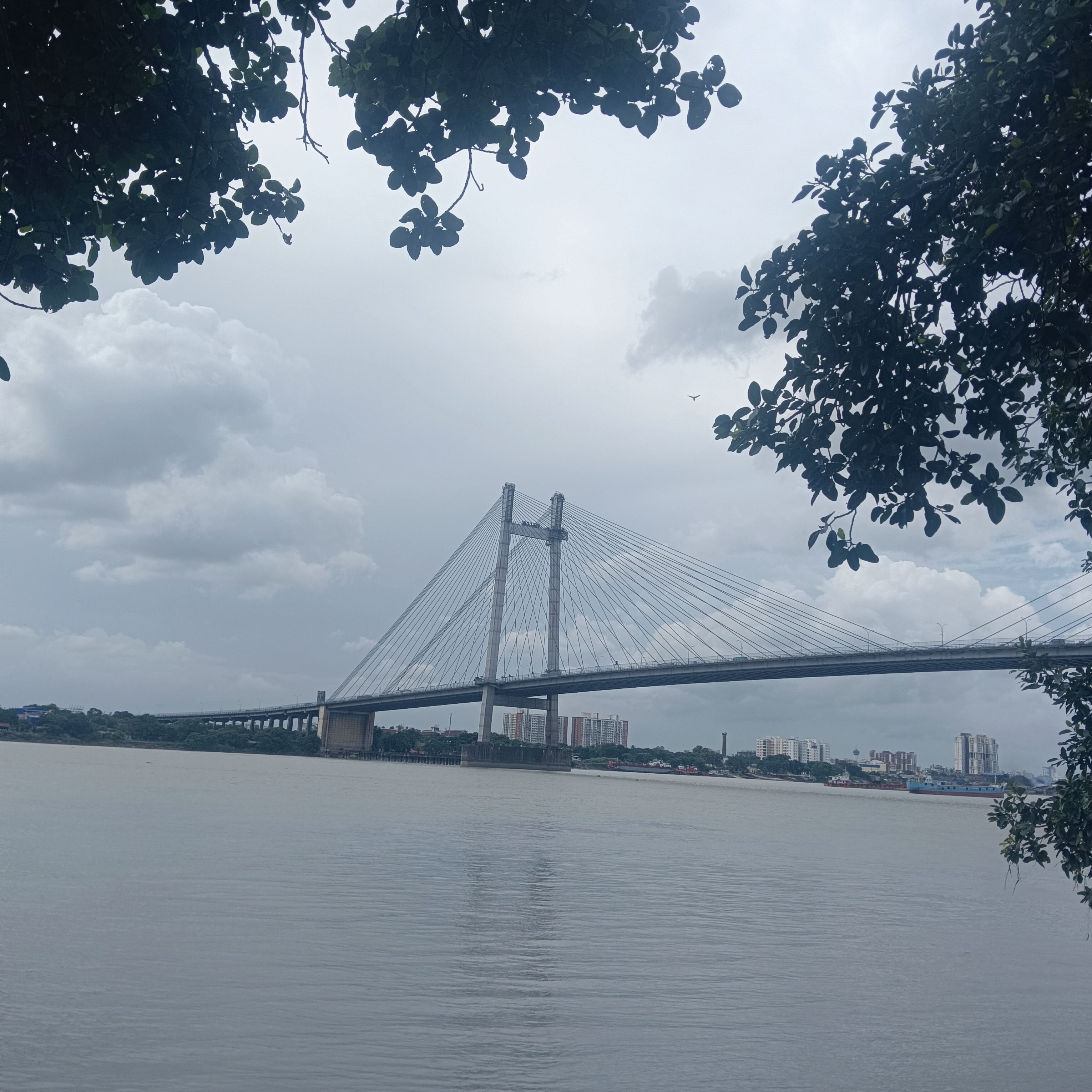
Vidyasagar Setu from Prinsep Ghat in the afternoon

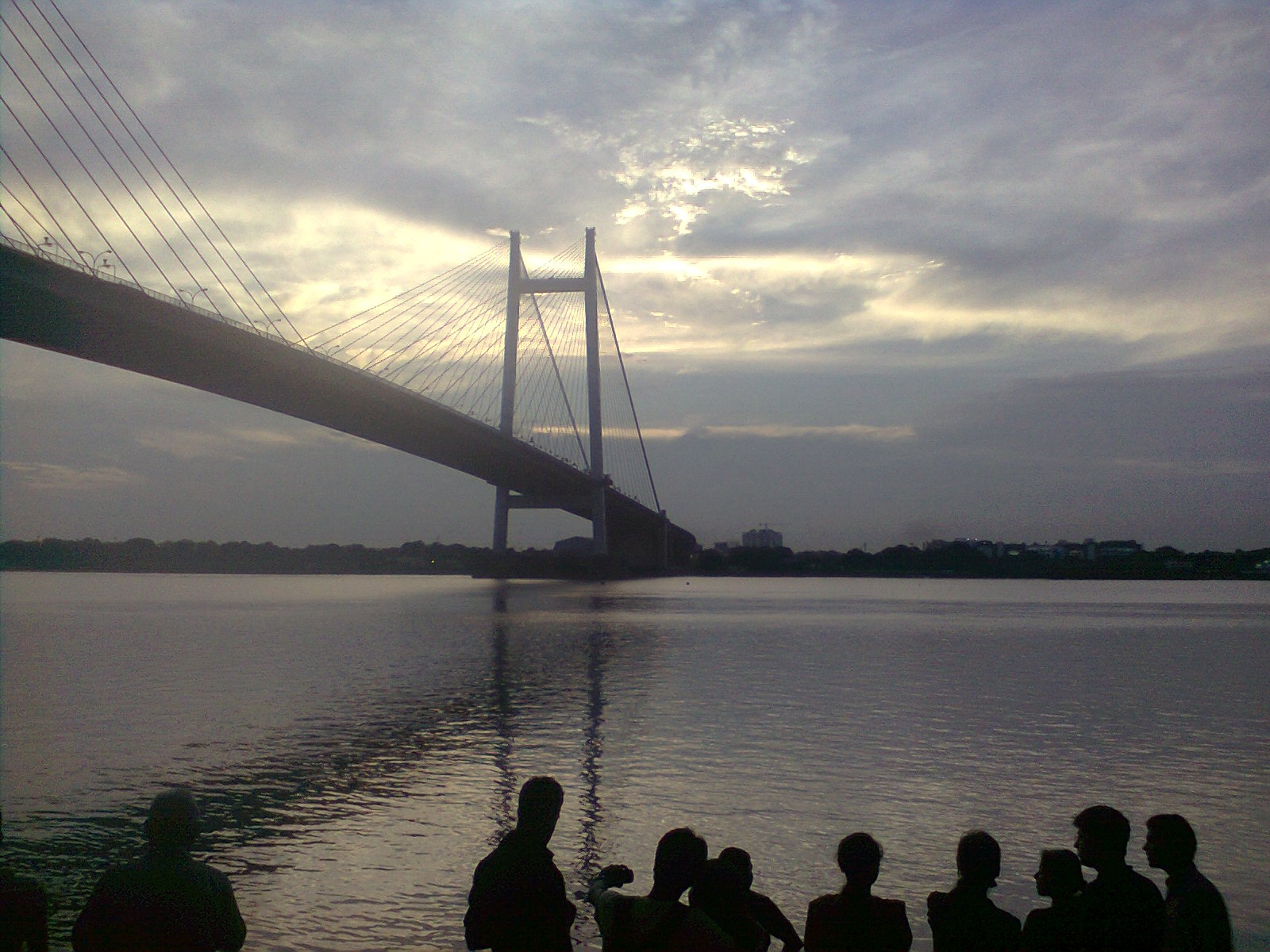
Evening view of Prinsep Ghat

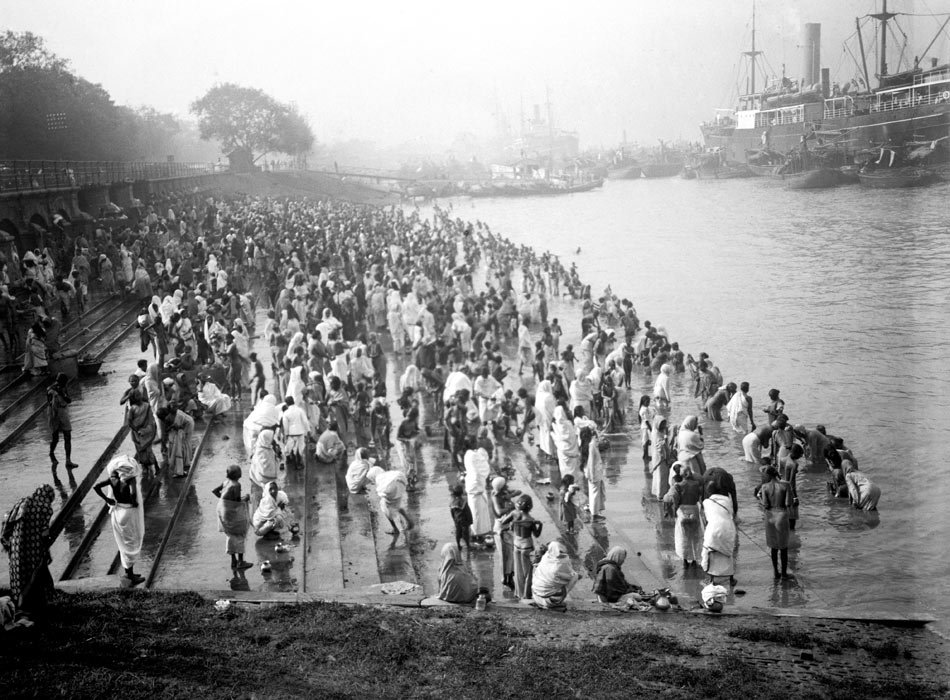
A view of Prinsep Ghat, Kolkata, in the 1900s.

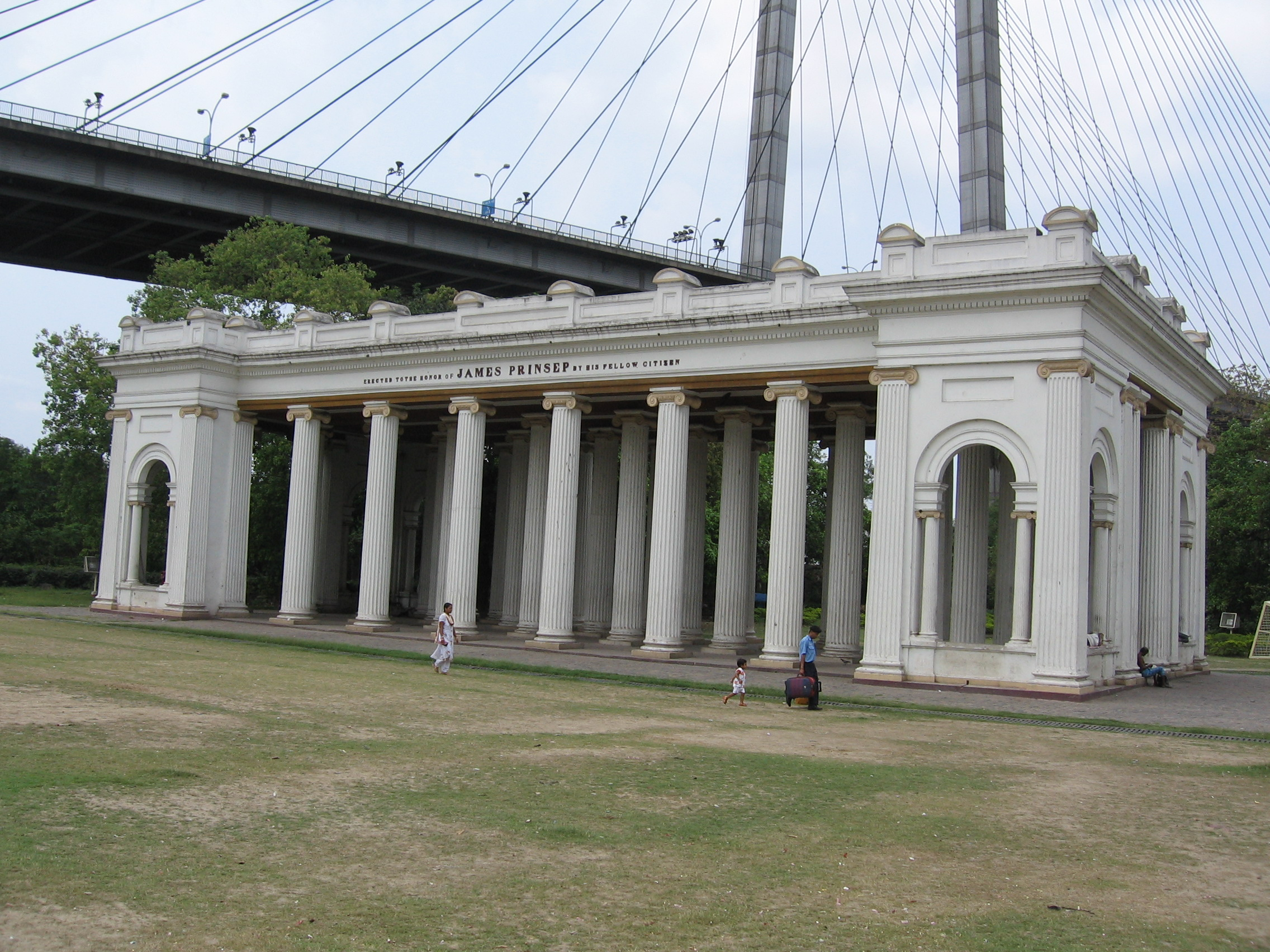
Prinsep Ghat at morning

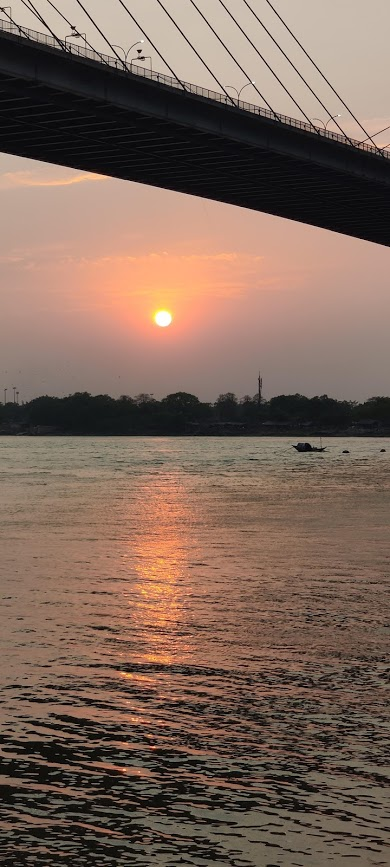
Sunset from the Princep Ghat

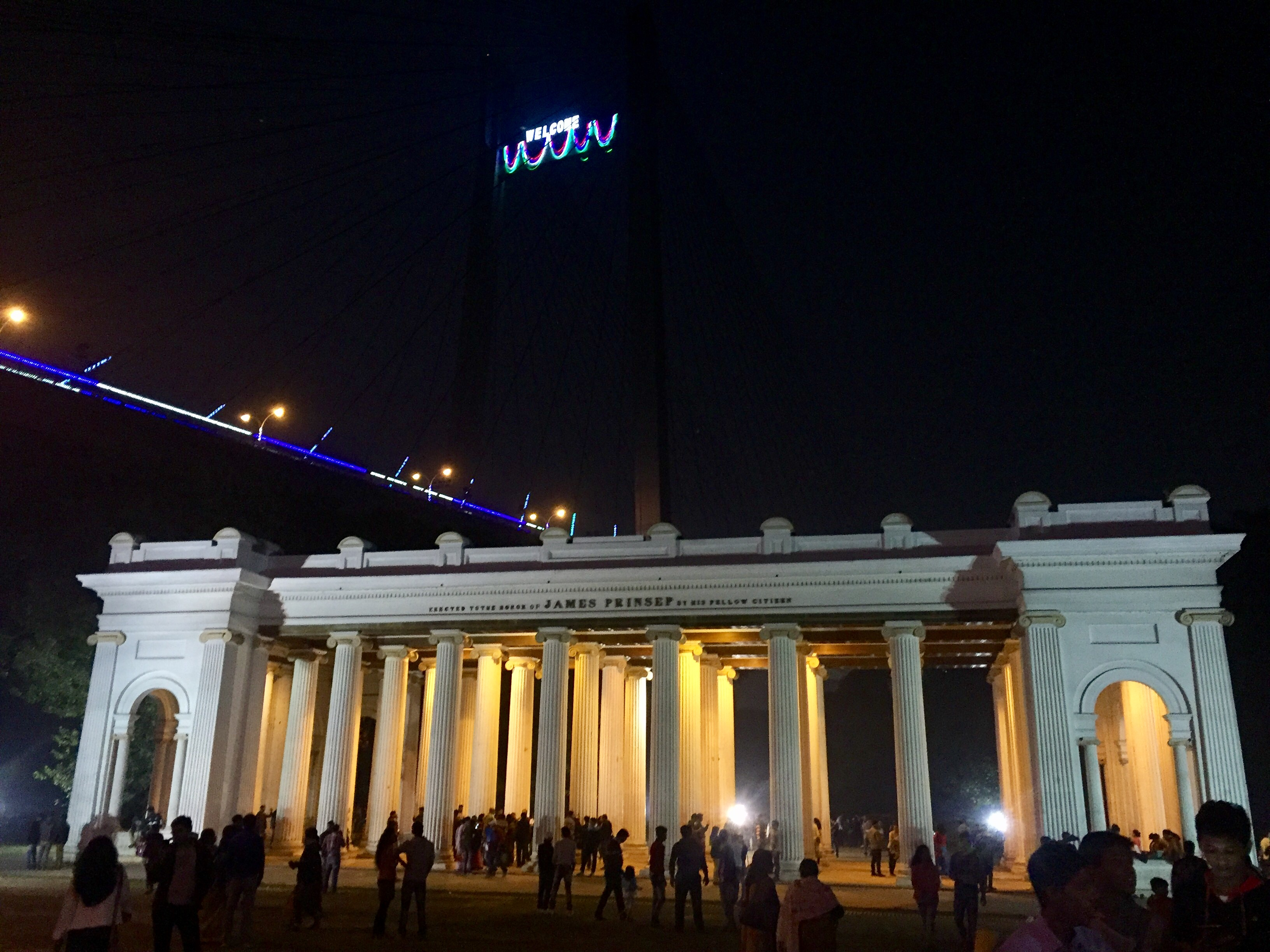
Prinsep Ghat at night

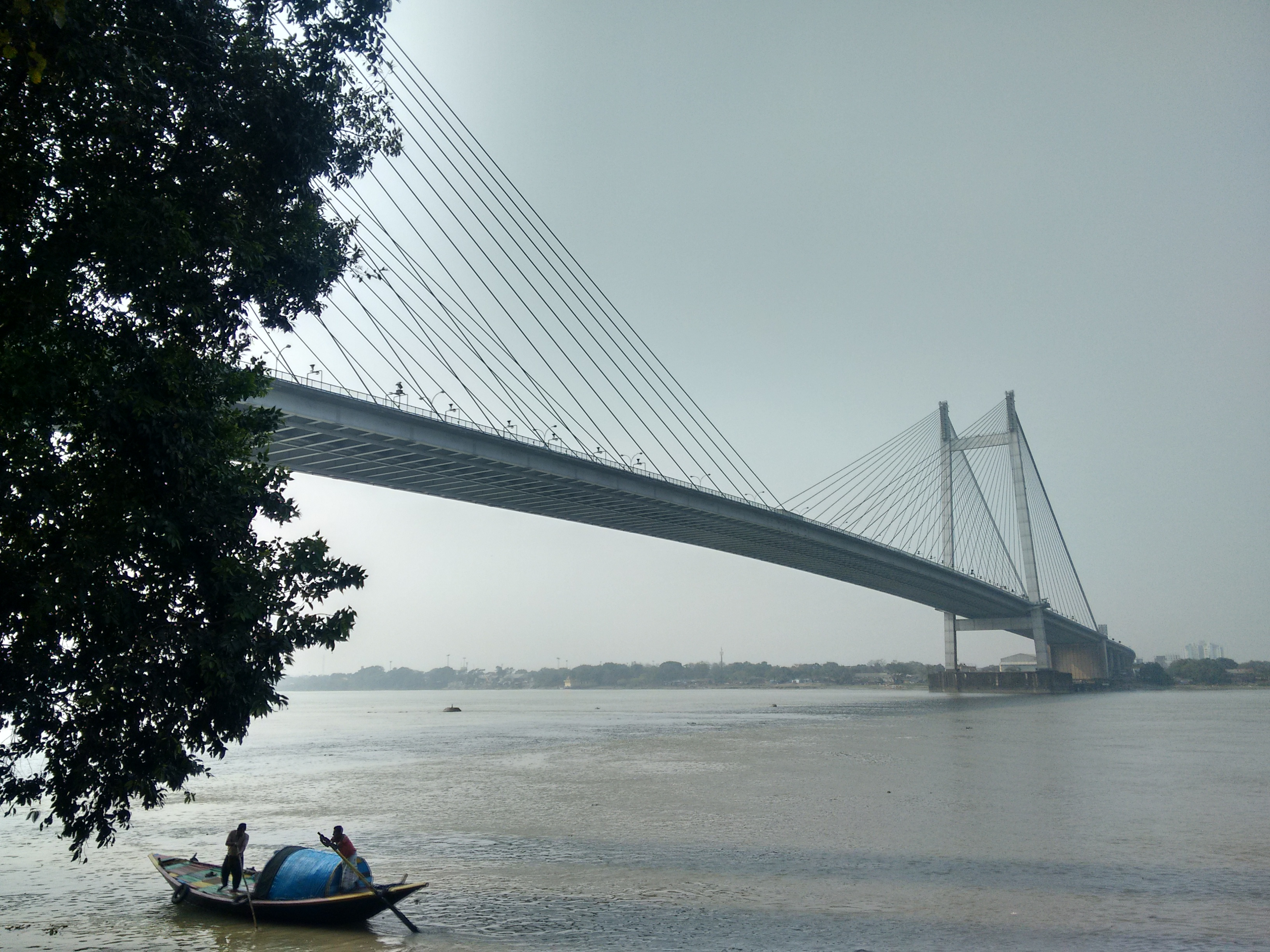
View of the Hooghly River and Vidyasagar Setu from Prinsep Ghat
