= Sundarbans district =

Proposed district in West Bengal, India

Sundarbans
- Proposed District
- Canning subdivision Kakdwip subdivision
- Interactive map of Sundarbans
- Coordinates: 22.1751965°N 88.4200762°E
- Country: India
- State: West Bengal
- Division: Presidency
- Headquarters: Jaynagar

Government
  - Subdivisions: Canning, Kakdwip
  - CD Blocks: Jaynagar I, Jaynagar II, Mathurapur I, Mathurapur II, Kultali, Canning I, Canning II, Basanti, Gosaba, Kakdwip, Namkhana, Patharpratima, Sagar
  - Lok Sabha constituencies: Jaynagar, Mathurapur
  - Vidhan Sabha constituencies: Gosaba, Basanti, Kultali, Patharpratima, Kakdwip, Sagar, Raidighi, Jaynagar, Canning Paschim, Canning Purba

Area
  - Total: 3,497.7 km^{2} (1,350.5 sq mi)

Population (2011)
  - Total: 3,335,448
  - Density: 953.61/km^{2} (2,469.8/sq mi)
  - Urban: 251,498

Demographics
  - Literacy: 76.20 per cent
  - Sex ratio: 949 ♂/♀

Languages
  - Official: Bengali
  - Additional official: English
- Time zone: UTC+05:30 (IST)
- Website: sundarbanpolice.wb.gov.in

Sundarbans district is a proposed district to be created in the Indian state of West Bengal. The district would be carved out from the existing South 24 Parganas district. The district headquarters would be Jaynagar.

== History ==
In November 2015, the Government of West Bengal announced its intention to create the district in the near future. Under this proposal, Sundarbans district will be created from thirteen community development blocks namely Jaynagar I, Jaynagar II, Mathurapur I, Mathurapur II, Kultali, Canning I, Canning II, Basanti, Gosaba, Kakdwip, Namkhana, Patharpratima and Sagar in South 24 Parganas district. In August 2022, the cabinet of West Bengal gave "in-principle approval" to the district's formation. On June 22, 2026, in the budget session of the West Bengal Legislative Assembly for the financial year 2026–27, Swapan Dasgupta, the new Finance Minister of the West Bengal Government, announced a proposal to form 5 new districts, including Sundarbans, in the state.
