= Basirhat district =

Proposed district in West Bengal, India

Basirhat
- Proposed District
- Interactive map of Basirhat
- Coordinates: 22°39′40″N 88°52′01″E
- Country: India
- State: West Bengal
- Division: Presidency
- Headquarters: Basirhat

Government
  - Subdivisions: Basirhat Sadar
  - CD Blocks: Swarupnagar, Baduria, Basirhat I, Basirhat II, Haroa, Minakhan, Hasnabad, Sandeshkhali I, Sandeshkhali II, Hingalganj
  - Lok Sabha constituencies: Basirhat, Bangaon
  - Vidhan Sabha constituencies: Swarupnagar, Baduria, Haroa, Minakhan, Sandeshkhali, Basirhat Dakshin, Basirhat Uttar, Hingalganj

Area
  - Total: 1,777.02 km^{2} (686.11 sq mi)

Population (2011)
  - Total: 2,271,810
  - Density: 1,278.44/km^{2} (3,311.14/sq mi)
  - Urban: 294,436

Demographics
  - Literacy: 74.15 per cent
  - Sex ratio: 949 ♂/♀

Languages
  - Official: Bengali
  - Additional official: English
- Time zone: UTC+05:30 (IST)
- Website: basirhatpolice.wb.gov.in

Basirhat district is a proposed district to be created in the Indian state of West Bengal. The district would be carved out from the existing North 24 Parganas district. The district headquarters would be Basirhat.

== History ==
In July 2017, the Government of West Bengal announced its intention to create the district in the near future. Under this proposal, Basirhat district will be created from ten community development blocks namely Swarupnagar, Baduria, Basirhat I, Basirhat II, Haroa, Minakhan, Hasnabad, Sandeshkhali I, Sandeshkhali II and Hingalganj in North 24 Parganas district. In August 2022, the cabinet of West Bengal gave "in-principle approval" to the district's formation.

On June 22, 2026, in the budget session of the West Bengal Legislative Assembly for the financial year 2026–27, Swapan Dasgupta, the new Finance Minister of the West Bengal Government, announced a proposal to form 5 new districts, including Basirhat, in the state.
