= 24 Parganas =

Former district in West Bengal, India

- Former District
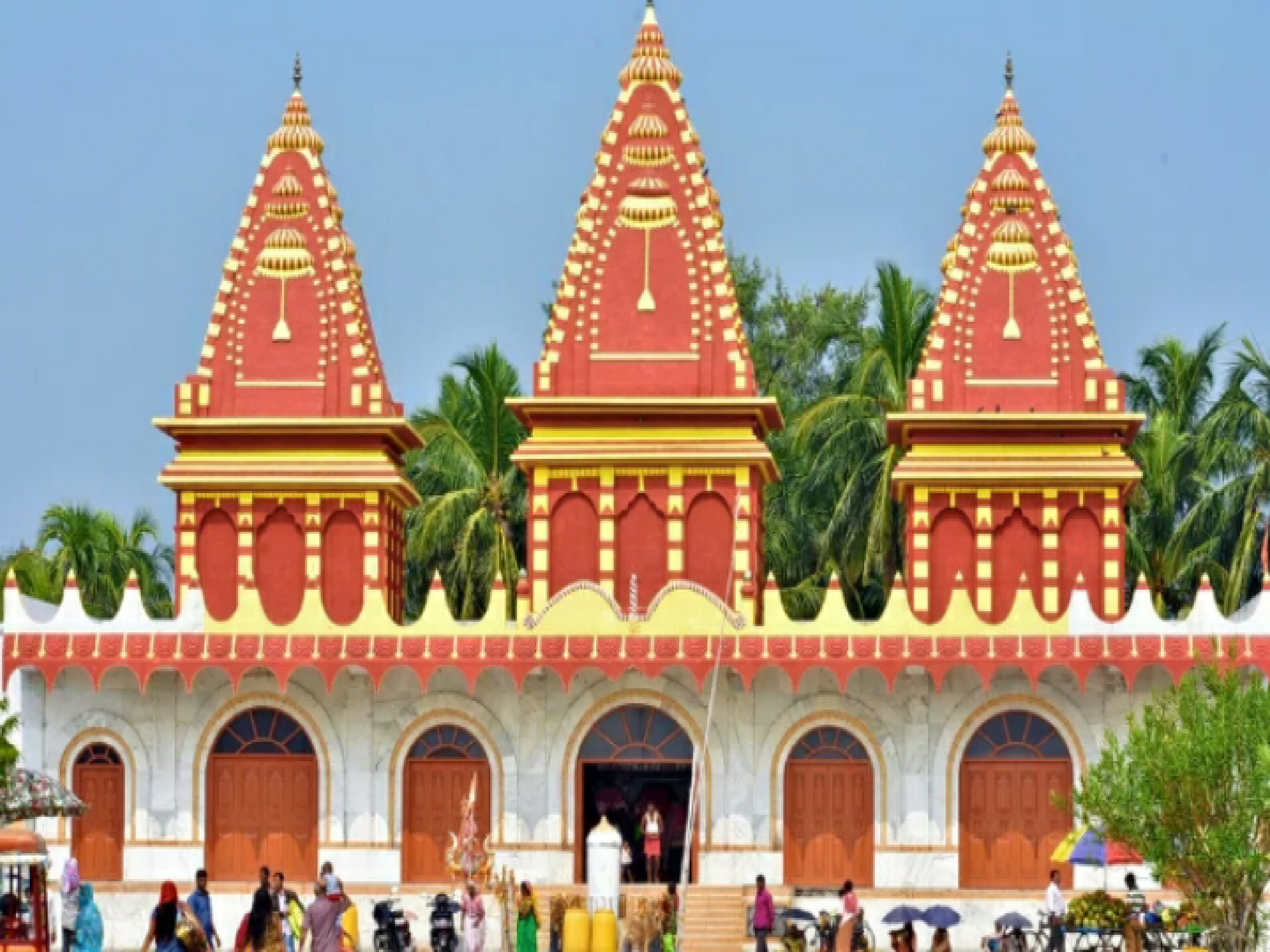
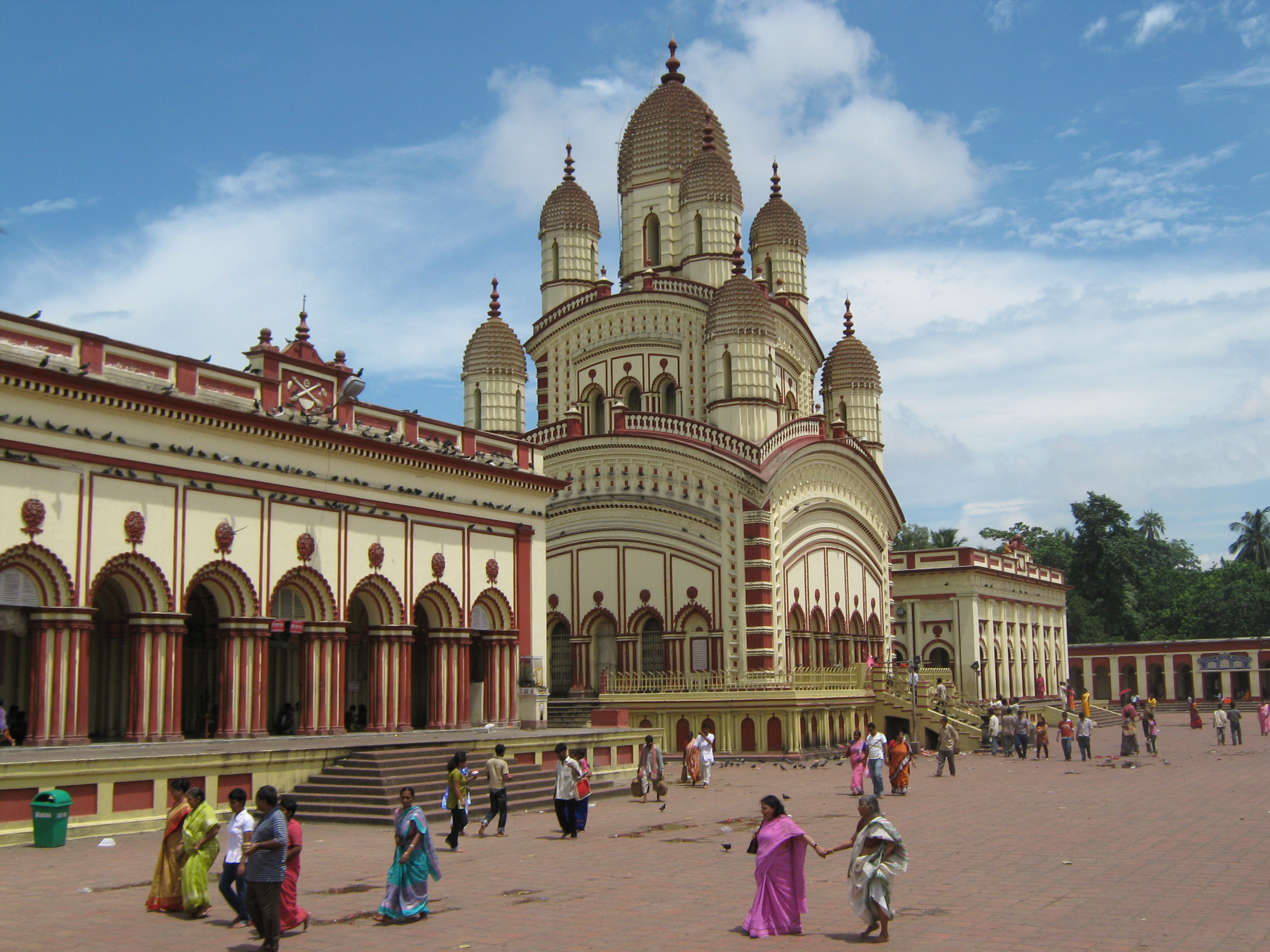
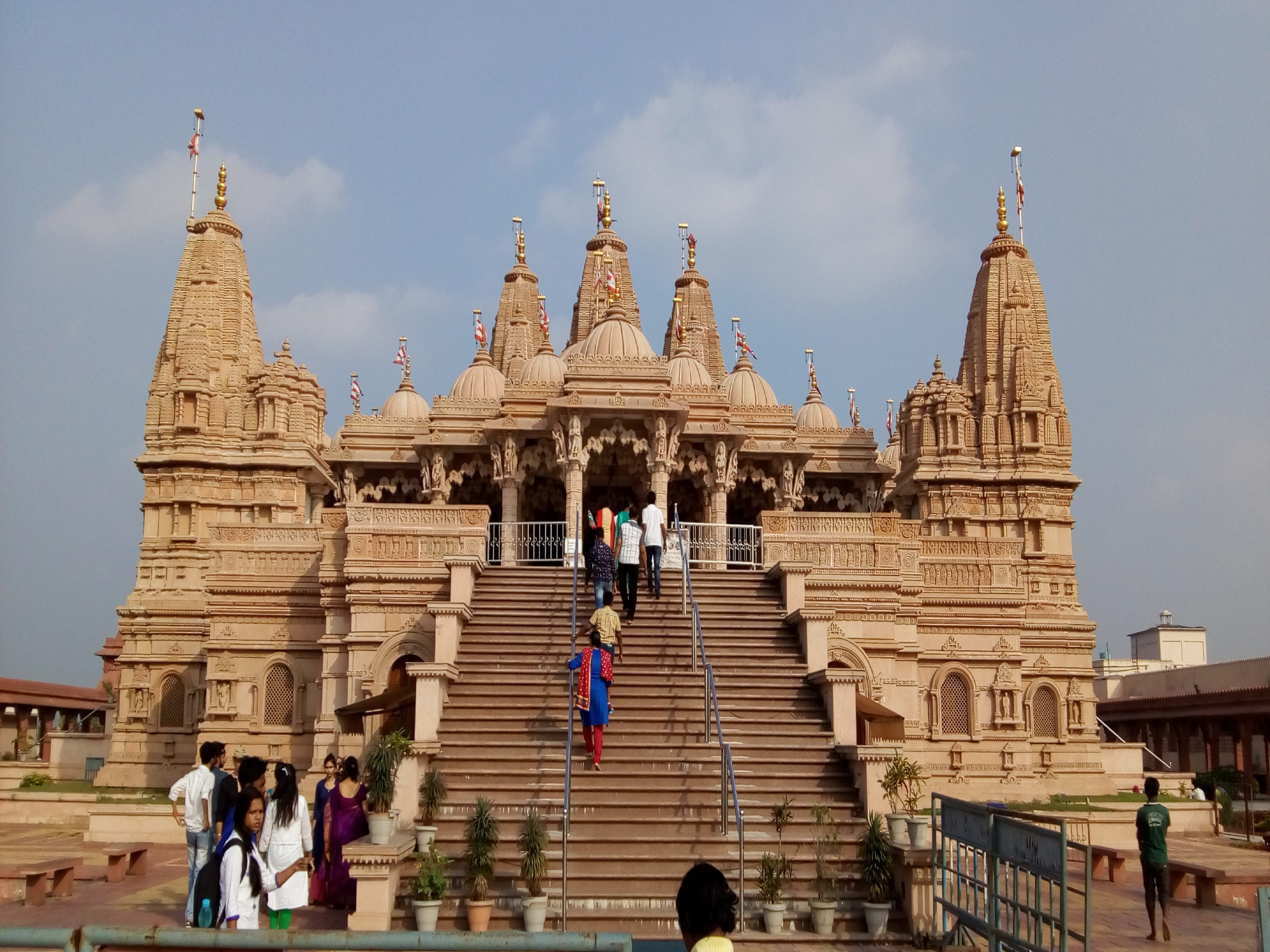
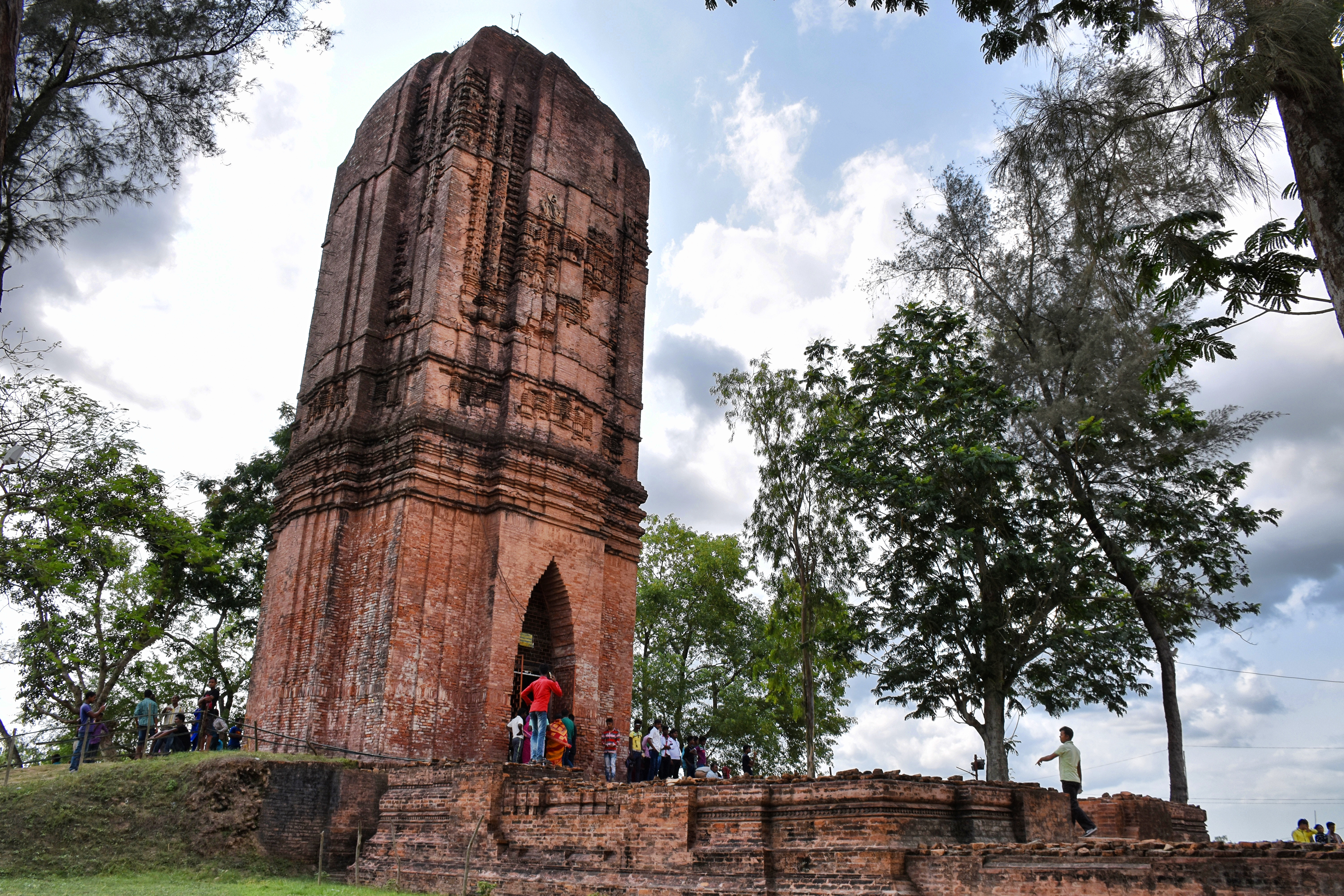
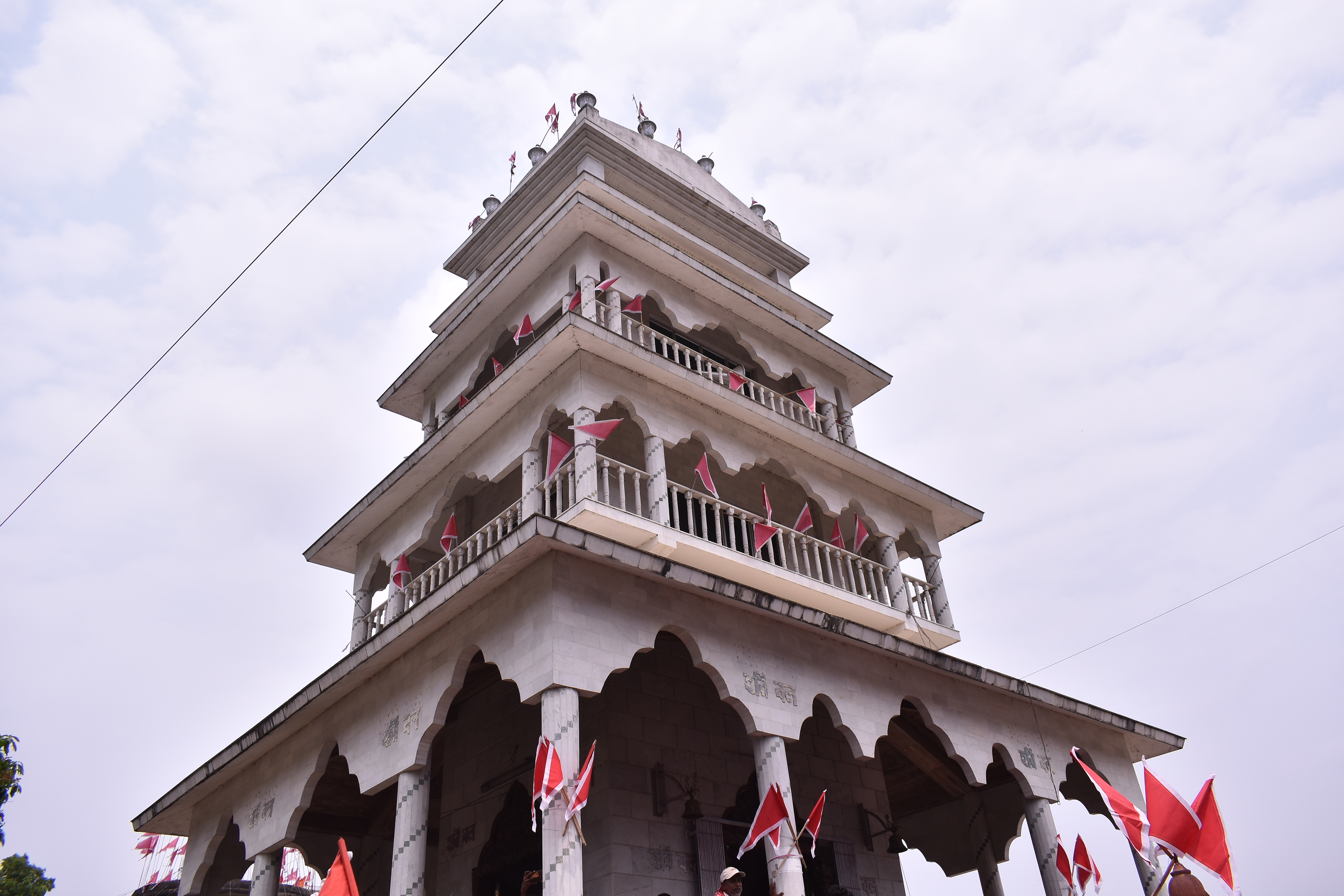
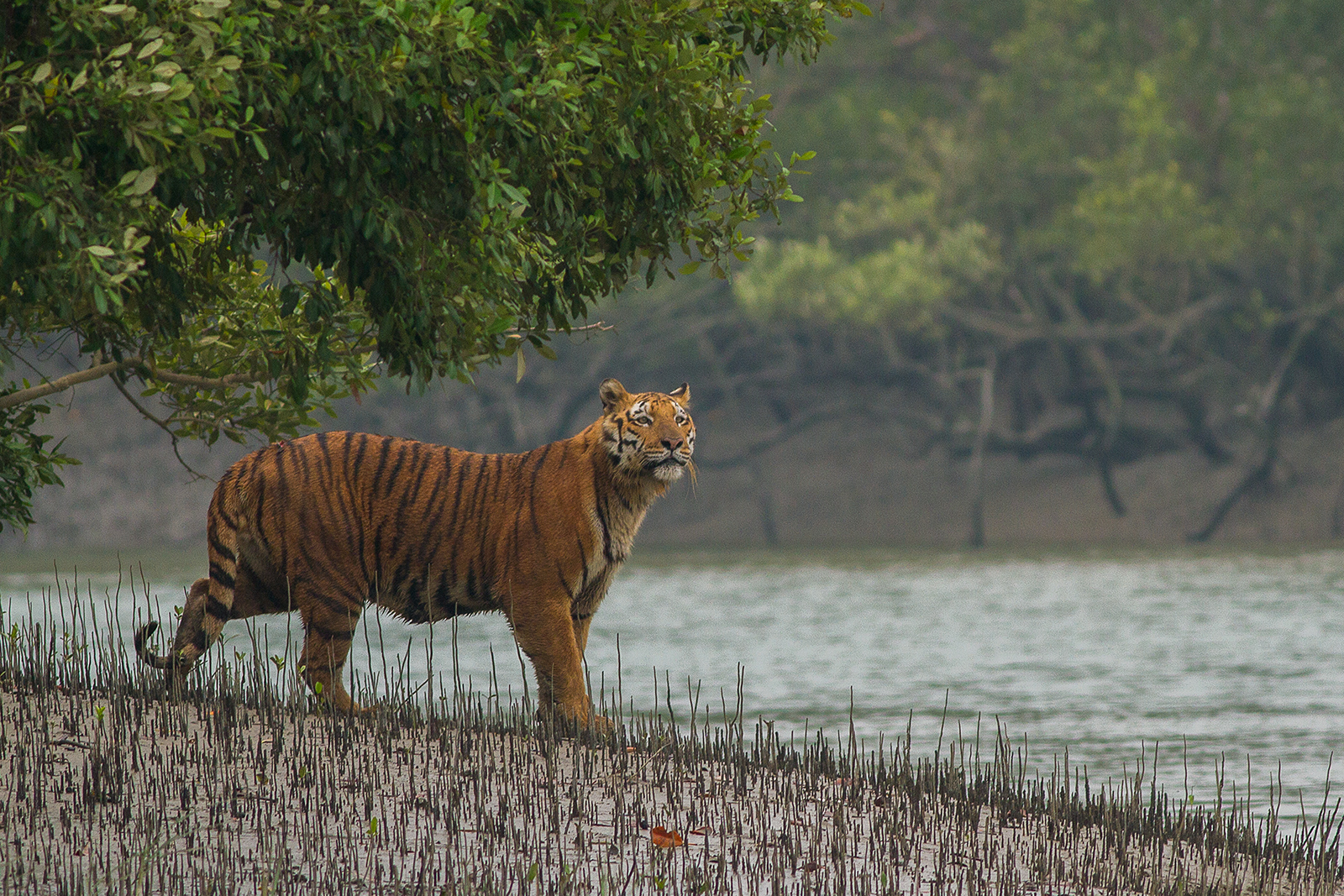
- Clockwise from top: Gangasagar Kapilmuni Temple, BAPS Shri Swaminarayan Temple in Pailan, Matua Mahasangha, Bengal tiger in the Sundarbans, Jatar Deul, Dakshineswar Kali Temple

- Location of 24 Parganas district in West Bengal
- Coordinates: 22.1815262°N 88.53780484°E
- Country: India
- State: West Bengal
- Division: Presidency
- Headquarters: Alipore

Government
  - Subdivisions: Alipore Sadar, Baruipur, Bidhannagar, Barrackpore, Barasat, Bangaon, Basirhat, Canning, Diamond Harbour, Kakdwip
  - CD Blocks: Thakurpukur Maheshtala, Budge Budge I, Budge Budge II, Bishnupur I, Bishnupur II, Bhangar I, Bhangar II, Sonarpur, Baruipur, Jaynagar I, Jaynagar II, Kultali, Rajarhat, Barrackpore I, Barrackpore II, Barasat I, Barasat II, Amdanga, Deganga, Habra I, Habra II, Bagdah, Bangaon, Gaighata, Baduria, Swarupnagar, Basirhat I, Basirhat II, Haroa, Hasnabad, Hingalganj, Minakhan, Sandeshkhali I, Sandeshkhali II, Canning I, Canning II, Basanti, Gosaba, Falta, Magrahat I, Magrahat II, Diamond Harbour I, Diamond Harbour II, Mandirbazar, Mathurapur I, Mathurapur II, Kulpi, Kakdwip, Namkhana, Patharpratima, Sagar
  - Lok Sabha constituencies: Bangaon, Barrackpore, Dum Dum, Barasat, Basirhat, Jaynagar, Mathurapur, Diamond Harbour, Jadavpur, Kolkata Dakshin
  - Vidhan Sabha constituencies: Bagda, Bangaon Uttar, Bangaon Dakshin, Gaighata, Swarupnagar, Baduria, Habra, Ashoknagar, Amdanga, Bijpur, Naihati, Bhatpara, Jagatdal, Noapara, Barrackpore, Khardaha, Dum Dum Uttar, Panihati, Kamarhati, Baranagar, Dum Dum, Madhyamgram, Barasat, Rajarhat New Town, Bidhannagar, Rajarhat Gopalpur, Deganga, Haroa, Minakhan, Sandeshkhali, Basirhat Dakshin, Basirhat Uttar, Hingalganj, Gosaba, Basanti, Kultali, Patharpratima, Kakdwip, Sagar, Kulpi, Raidighi, Mandirbazar, Jaynagar, Baruipur Purba, Canning Paschim, Canning Purba, Baruipur Paschim, Magrahat Purba, Magrahat Paschim, Diamond Harbour, Falta, Satgachia, Bishnupur, Sonarpur Dakshin, Bhangar, Sonarpur Uttar, Behala Purba, Maheshtala, Budge Budge, Metiaburuz, Jadavpur, Tollyganj, Kasba, Behala Paschim

Area
  - Total: 14,136 km^{2} (5,458 sq mi)

Population (1981)
  - Total: 10,739,439
  - Density: 759.72/km^{2} (1,967.7/sq mi)
  - Urban: 4,169,482

Demographics
  - Literacy: 46.17 per cent
  - Sex ratio: 903 ♂/♀

Languages
  - Official: Bengali
  - Additional official: English
- Time zone: UTC+05:30 (IST)

24 Parganas (Pron: pɔrɡɔnɔs; abbr. 24 PGS), or sometimes Twenty Four Parganas, is a former district in the Indian state of West Bengal, headquartered in Alipore. On 1 March 1986, the district was bifurcated into two separate districts namely North 24 Parganas and South 24 Parganas. It was the largest district of West Bengal by area and population at the time of bifurcation.

== History ==
The district was directly not attached to the Gupta rulers. The district was also not a part of the Shashanka's unified Bengali empire i.e. Gauda, but it is assumed that the district which was the south-west frontier territory of ancient Bengal, was comprised in under the rule of Dharmapala. Existence of the land form is evidence from the 2nd century A.D. writing of Ptolemy's treatise where it is said that the ancient land of Gangaridai was stretched between the rivers Bhagirathi-Hooghly (lower Ganges) and Padma-Meghna. What is known today as the 24 Parganas was the south and the south-eastern part of the Gangaridai kingdom. References to this portion of the Gangetic Delta in the Puranas, Mahabharata and Raghuvamsa show that it lay between the kingdom of the Suhmas and the Vangas.

From the early eighteenth century, slowly but steadily the East India Company was strengthening their position in Bengal. The small rulers of Bengal got their biggest blow when the last independent Nawab of Bengal Siraj-ud-Daulah faced defeat in the Battle of Plassey. Six months after the Battle of Plassey, on 20 December 1757, under the terms of a treaty, the then Nawab of Bengal, Mir Jafar, gave the East India Company the right to enjoy the zamindari of twenty-four parganas in return for an annual rent of 1,200 rupees. The total area then was 882 square miles, which later increased to 5,639 square miles with the addition of other territories. Henceforth the region was collectively called 24 Parganas. These twenty-four parganas were: (1) Akbarpur, (2) Amirpur, (3) Azimabad, (4) Balia, (5) Baridhari, (6) Basandari, (7) Calcutta, (8) Dakhin Sagar, (9) Garh, (10) Hathiagarh, (11) Ikhtiarpur, (12) Kharijuri, (13) Khaspur, (14) Maidanmal, (15) Magura, (16) Manpur, (17) Mayda, (18) Munragachha, (19) Paikan, (20) Pechakuli, (21) Satal, (22) Shahnagar, (23) Shahpur, and (24) Uttar Pargana. In 1759, the East India Company assigned these twenty-four parganas to Robert Clive as a personal jagir and after his death in 1774, these twenty-four parganas again came under the direct authority of the East India Company. Thus the British rule under the mask of a trader started.

In 1793, during the rule of Lord Cornwallis, entire Sundarbans were in 24 Parganas. In 1802, some parganas on the western banks of river Hooghly were included into it. These parganas were in Nadia district earlier. In 1814, a separate collectorate was established in 24 Parganas. In 1817, Falta and Baranagar and in 1820, some portions of Nadia's Balanda and Anwarpur were encompassed to it. In 1824, portions of Barasat, Khulna and Bakerganj were also included to it. In 1824, the district headquarters was shifted from Kolkata to Baruipur, but in 1828, it was removed to Alipore. In 1834, the district was split into two districts – Alipore and Barasat, but later these were united again. In 1861, the entire district is divided into eight subdivisions viz. Alipore, Diamond Harbour, Barasat, Barrackpore, Dum Dum, Baruipur, Basirhat and Satkhira. In 1905, some portion of the district around the Sundarbans was detached and linked with neighbouring Khulna and Barisal districts. After partition in 1947, these parts remained in the territory of Bangladesh, but Bangaon in Jessore district was added to 24 Parganas.

After India's independence, an administrative reform committee in the year 1983 under the Chairmanship of Dr. Ashok Mitra suggested to split the district into two. As per their recommendation, the district was bifurcated into two parts on 1 March 1986 i.e. North 24 Parganas and South 24 Parganas. The North 24 Parganas district had been formed with five subdivisions namely Barasat Sadar, Bidhannagar, Barrackpore, Bangaon, and Basirhat. The South 24 Parganas district had been formed with five subdivisions namely Alipore Sadar, Baruipur, Canning, Diamond Harbour, and Kakdwip.

== Demographics ==
Historical population
Year	Pop.	±% p.a.
1901	2,067,061	—
1911	2,358,381	+1.33%
1921	2,509,910	+0.62%
1931	2,740,095	+0.88%
1941	3,425,982	+2.26%
1951	4,201,511	+2.06%
1961	5,856,954	+3.38%
1971	7,871,208	+3.00%
1981	10,739,439	+3.16%
Note: After 1981, the 24 Parganas district was bifurcated into two separate districts namely North 24 Parganas and South 24 Parganas. The census data is the addition of two split districts. Source: Census of India

== See also ==
- Pargana
