= Ichamati district =

Proposed district in West Bengal, India

Ichamati
- Proposed District
- Interactive map of Ichamati
- Coordinates: 23.07°N 88.82°E
- Country: India
- State: West Bengal
- Division: Presidency
- Headquarters: Bangaon

Government
  - Subdivisions: Bangaon Sadar
  - CD Blocks: Bagdah, Bangaon, Gaighata
  - Lok Sabha constituencies: Bangaon
  - Vidhan Sabha constituencies: Bagdah, Bangaon Uttar, Bangaon Dakshin, Gaighata

Area
  - Total: 838.17 km^{2} (323.62 sq mi)

Population (2011)
  - Total: 1,063,028
  - Density: 1,268.3/km^{2} (3,284.8/sq mi)
  - Urban: 173,592

Demographics
  - Literacy: 79.44 per cent
  - Sex ratio: 949 ♂/♀

Languages
  - Official: Bengali
  - Additional official: English
- Time zone: UTC+05:30 (IST)
- Website: bongaonpolice.wb.gov.in

Ichamati district is a proposed district to be created in the Indian state of West Bengal. The district would be carved out from the existing North 24 Parganas district. The district headquarters would be Bangaon.

== History ==
In May 2019, the Government of West Bengal announced its intention to create the district in the near future. Under this proposal, Ichamati district will be created from three community development blocks namely Bagdah, Bangaon and Gaighata in North 24 Parganas district. In August 2022, the cabinet of West Bengal gave "in-principle approval" to the district's formation.

== Demographic ==
Religion in Ichamati district (2011)
| Hinduism | 85.63% |
| Islam | 13.73% |
| Other or not stated | 0.64% |
