= Berhampore district =

Proposed district in West Bengal, India

Berhampore
- Proposed District
- Berhampore subdivision Kandi subdivision
- Interactive map of Berhampore
- Coordinates: 24.06°N 88.15°E
- Country: India
- State: West Bengal
- Division: Malda
- Headquarters: Berhampore

Government
  - Subdivisions: Berhampore Sadar, Kandi
  - CD Blocks: Berhampore, Beldanga I, Beldanga II, Hariharpara, Naoda, Kandi, Khargram, Burwan, Bharatpur I, Bharatpur II
  - Lok Sabha constituencies: Baharampur, Murshidabad, Jangipur
  - Vidhan Sabha constituencies: Khargram, Burwan, Kandi, Bharatpur, Beldanga, Baharampur, Hariharpara, Naoda

Area
  - Total: 2,396.33 km^{2} (925.23 sq mi)

Population (2011)
  - Total: 2,881,170
  - Density: 1,202.33/km^{2} (3,114.01/sq mi)
  - Urban: 420,985

Demographics
  - Literacy: 67.33 per cent
  - Sex ratio: 958 ♂/♀

Languages
  - Official: Bengali
  - Additional official: English
- Time zone: UTC+05:30 (IST)
- Website: murshidabad.gov.in

Berhampore district is a proposed district to be created in the Indian state of West Bengal. The district would be carved out from the existing Murshidabad district. The district headquarters would be Berhampore.

== History ==
In January 2020, the Government of West Bengal announced its intention to create the district in the near future. Under this proposal, Berhampore district will be created from ten community development blocks namely Berhampore, Beldanga I, Beldanga II, Hariharpara, Naoda, Kandi, Khargram, Burwan, Bharatpur I and Bharatpur II in Murshidabad district. In August 2022, the cabinet of West Bengal gave "in-principle approval" to the district's formation.
