= Ranaghat district =

Proposed district in West Bengal, India

Ranaghat
- Proposed District
- Ranaghat subdivision Kalyani subdivision
- Interactive map of Ranaghat
- Coordinates: 23.18°N 88.58°E
- Country: India
- State: West Bengal
- Division: Presidency
- Headquarters: Ranaghat

Government
  - Subdivisions: Ranaghat Sadar, Kalyani
  - CD Blocks: Hanskhali, Santipur, Ranaghat I, Ranaghat II, Chakdaha, Haringhata
  - Lok Sabha constituencies: Ranaghat, Bangaon
  - Vidhan Sabha constituencies: Santipur, Ranaghat Uttar Paschim, Ranaghat Uttar Purba, Ranaghat Dakshin, Chakdaha, Kalyani, Haringhata

Area
  - Total: 1,420.15 km^{2} (548.32 sq mi)

Population (2011)
  - Total: 2,324,324
  - Density: 1,636.67/km^{2} (4,238.97/sq mi)
  - Urban: 1,281,271

Demographics
  - Literacy: 78.73 per cent
  - Sex ratio: 947 ♂/♀

Languages
  - Official: Bengali
  - Additional official: English
- Time zone: UTC+05:30 (IST)
- Website: ranaghatpolice.wb.gov.in

Ranaghat district is a proposed district to be created in the Indian state of West Bengal. The district would be carved out from the existing Nadia district. The district headquarters would be Ranaghat.

== History ==
In May 2019, the Government of West Bengal announced its intention to create the district in the near future. Under this proposal, Ranaghat district will be created from six community development blocks namely Hanskhali, Santipur, Ranaghat I, Ranaghat II, Chakdaha and Haringhata in Nadia district. In August 2022, the cabinet of West Bengal gave "in-principle approval" to the district's formation.
