= Jangipur district =

Proposed district in West Bengal, India

Jangipur
- Proposed District
- Interactive map of Jangipur
- Coordinates: 24°27′22″N 88°6′26″E
- Country: India
- State: West Bengal
- Division: Malda
- Headquarters: Jangipur

Government
  - Subdivisions: Jangipur
  - CD Blocks: Farakka, Samserganj, Suti I, Suti II, Raghunathganj I, Raghunathganj II, Sagardighi
  - Lok Sabha constituencies: Jangipur, Maldah Dakshin
  - Vidhan Sabha constituencies: Farakka, Samserganj, Suti, Jangipur, Raghunathganj, Sagardighi

Area
  - Total: 1,097.82 km^{2} (423.87 sq mi)

Population (2011)
  - Total: 1,972,308
  - Density: 1,796.57/km^{2} (4,653.09/sq mi)
  - Urban: 859,335

Demographics
  - Literacy: 59.95 per cent
  - Sex ratio: 958 ♂/♀

Languages
  - Official: Bengali
  - Additional official: English
- Time zone: UTC+05:30 (IST)
- Website: jangipurpolice.wb.gov.in

Jangipur district is a proposed district to be created in the Indian state of West Bengal. The district would be carved out from the existing Murshidabad district. The district headquarters would be Jangipur.

== History ==
In January 2020, the Government of West Bengal announced its intention to create the district in the near future. Under this proposal, Jangipur district will be created from seven community development blocks namely Farakka, Samserganj, Suti I, Suti II, Raghunathganj I, Raghunathganj II and Sagardighi in Murshidabad district. In August 2022, the cabinet of West Bengal gave "in-principle approval" to the district's formation. On June 22, 2026, in the budget session of the West Bengal Legislative Assembly for the financial year 2026–27, Swapan Dasgupta, the new Finance Minister of the West Bengal Government, announced a proposal to form 5 new districts, including Jangipur, in the state.
