= Bishnupur district, West Bengal =

Proposed district in West Bengal, India

Bishnupur
- Proposed District
- Interactive map of Bishnupur
- Coordinates: 23°04′26″N 87°19′12″E
- Country: India
- State: West Bengal
- Division: Medinipur
- Headquarters: Bishnupur

Government
  - Subdivisions: Bishnupur Sadar
  - CD Blocks: Sonamukhi, Bishnupur, Patrasayer, Joypur, Indas, Kotulpur
  - Lok Sabha constituencies: Bishnupur
  - Vidhan Sabha constituencies: Bishnupur, Katulpur, Indas, Sonamukhi

Area
  - Total: 1,870.75 km^{2} (722.30 sq mi)

Population (2011)
  - Total: 1,111,935
  - Density: 594.379/km^{2} (1,539.44/sq mi)
  - Urban: 105,351

Demographics
  - Literacy: 70.28 per cent
  - Sex ratio: 914 ♂/♀

Languages
  - Official: Bengali
  - Additional official: English
- Time zone: UTC+05:30 (IST)
- Website: bankura.gov.in

Bishnupur district is a proposed district to be created in the Indian state of West Bengal. The district would be carved out from the existing Bankura district. The district headquarters would be Bishnupur.

== History ==
In May 2019, the Government of West Bengal announced its intention to create the district in the near future. Under this proposal, Bishnupur district will be created from six community development blocks namely Sonamukhi, Bishnupur, Patrasayer, Joypur, Indas and Kotulpur in Bankura district. In August 2022, the cabinet of West Bengal gave "in-principle approval" to the district's formation.
