= Districts of West Bengal =

Districts of West Bengal

West Bengal is an Indian state located in eastern portion of the country. As of year 2026, the state is divided into 27 districts and 5 administrative divisions.

The Himalayas lies in the north of West Bengal and the Bay of Bengal is at the south. Between them, the river Ganga flows eastwards and its main distributary, the Hooghly River, flows south to reach the Bay of Bengal. The Siliguri Corridor, which connects North-East India with rest of the India, lies in the North Bengal region of the state. Geographically, West Bengal is divided into a variety of regions—Darjeeling Himalayan hill region, Terai and Dooars region, North Bengal plains, Rarh region, Western plateau and high lands, coastal plains, Sundarbans and the Ganga Delta.

In 1947, when India gained independence, the state of West Bengal was formed, with 14 districts, as per partition plan of the then Bengal province of British India. The former princely state Koch Bihar joined as a district on 26 January 1950, and the former French enclave Chandannagore joined as part of the Hooghly district in 1954. The States Reorganisation Act of 1956 led to addition of Purulia district to the state and to enlargement of West Dinajpur district. Later, larger districts such as West Dinajpur, 24 Parganas and Midnapore were bifurcated.

West Bengal is now divided into 23 districts which includes the newly formed Alipurduar district (formed on 25 June 2014), Kalimpong district (formed on 14 February 2017), Jhargram district (formed on 4 April 2017), and the splitting of the former Bardhaman district into Purba Bardhaman district and Paschim Bardhaman district (formed on 7 April 2017). The districts are grouped into five divisions.

On 22 June 2026, in West Bengal Legislative Assembly during the 2026-27 Budget in Badal Session the Finance Minister of the West Bengal State Government Swapan Dasgupta announced the creation of 5 new districts : Kolkata (reorganisation), Basirhat, Sundarban, Jangipur and Arambagh. West Bengal is now divided into 27 districts into 5 divisions.

Tropic of Cancer (23°30' N latitude) passes through five Districts of West Bengal. Divisions are administered by Divisional Commissioners. Kolkata, the capital of the state, constitutes the Kolkata district. Other districts are further divided into administrative units such as subdivisions and blocks, administered by SDO and BDO, respectively. The Panchayati Raj has a three-tier structure in the state. The atomic unit is called a Gram Panchayat, which is the Panchayat organisation for a collection of villages. The block-level organisations are called Panchayat Samiti, and the district-level organisations are named Zilla Parishad.

== Geography ==
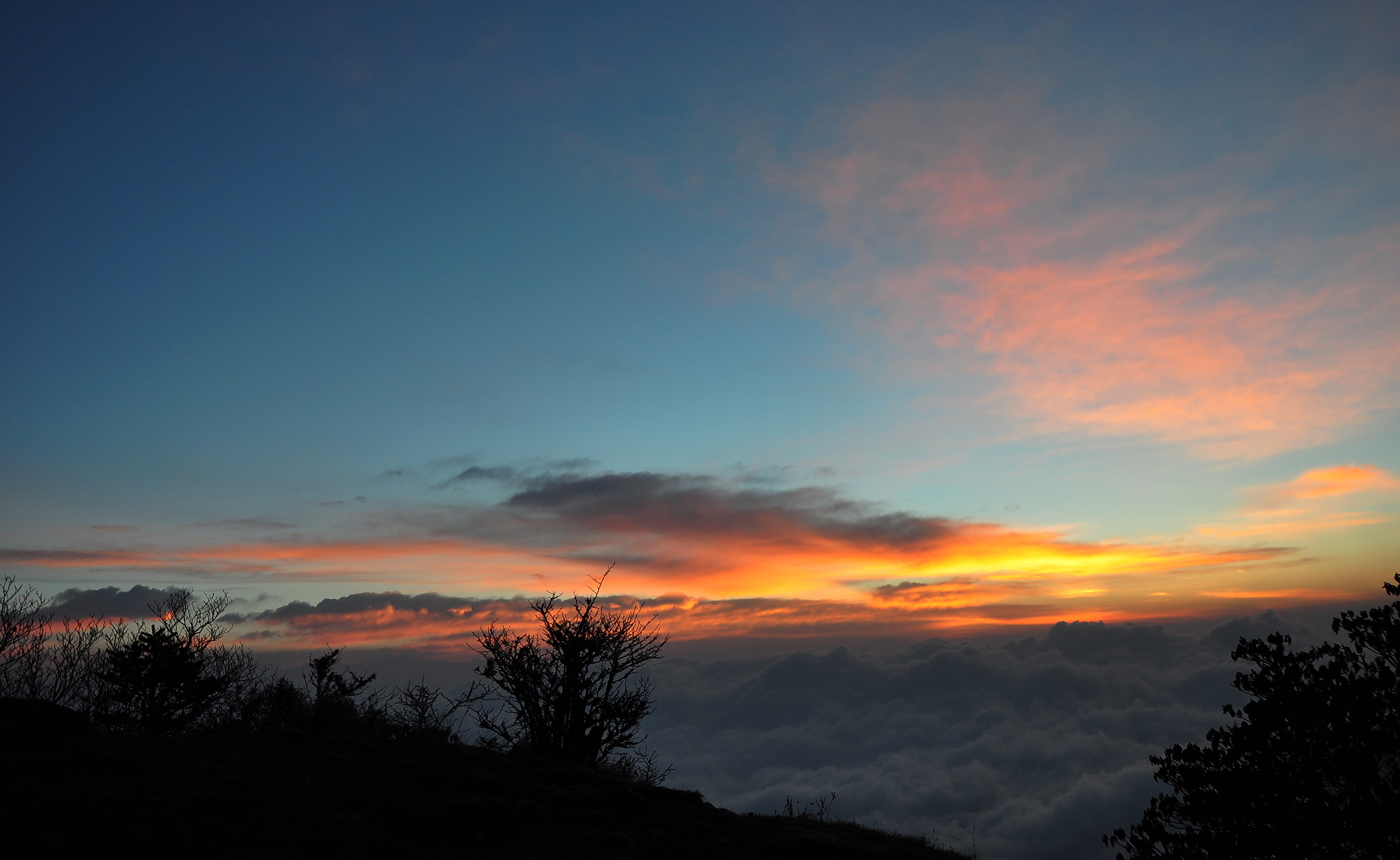
Sandakphu highest point of West Bengal

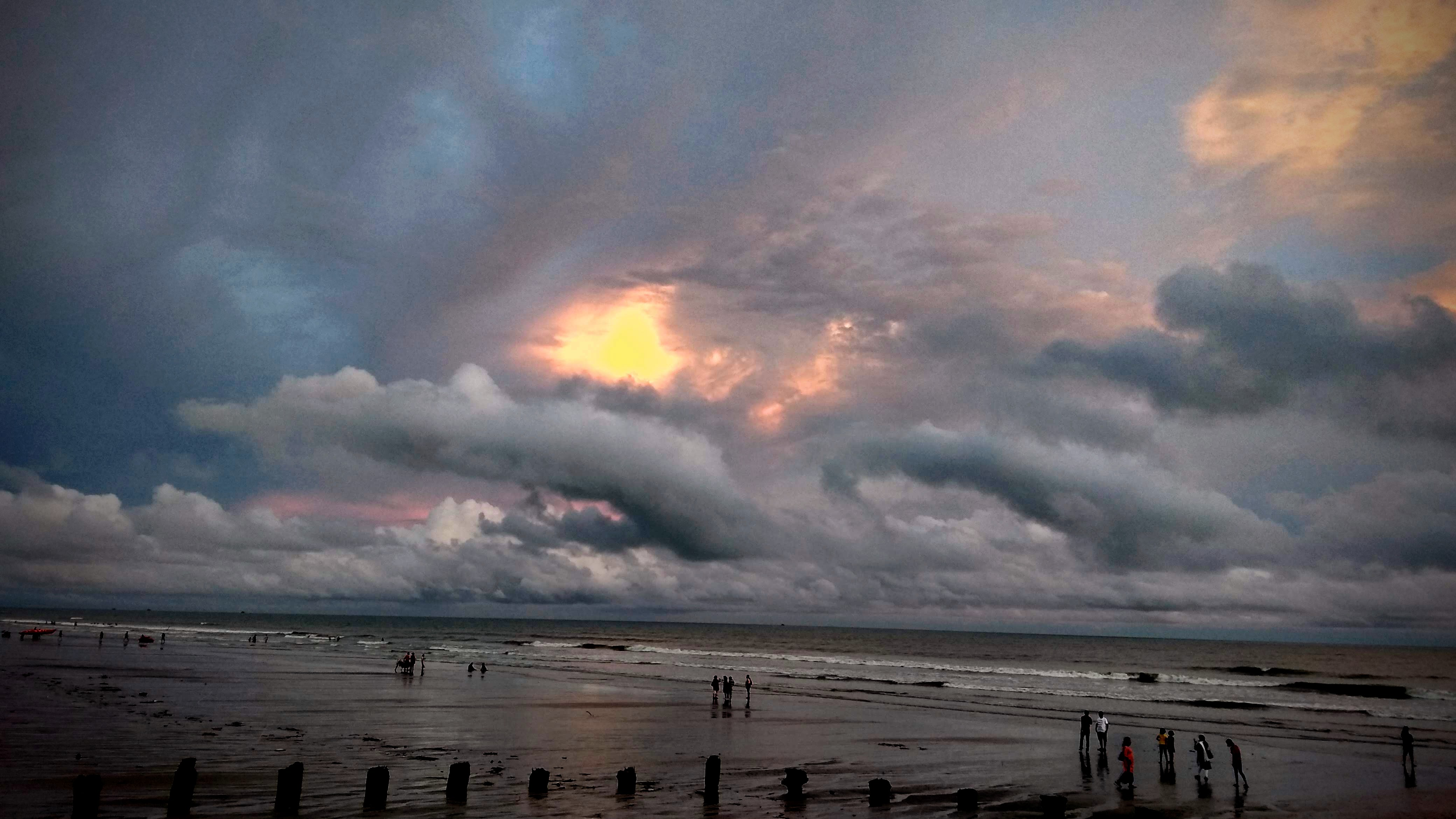
Mandarmani sea beach located in East Medinipur district

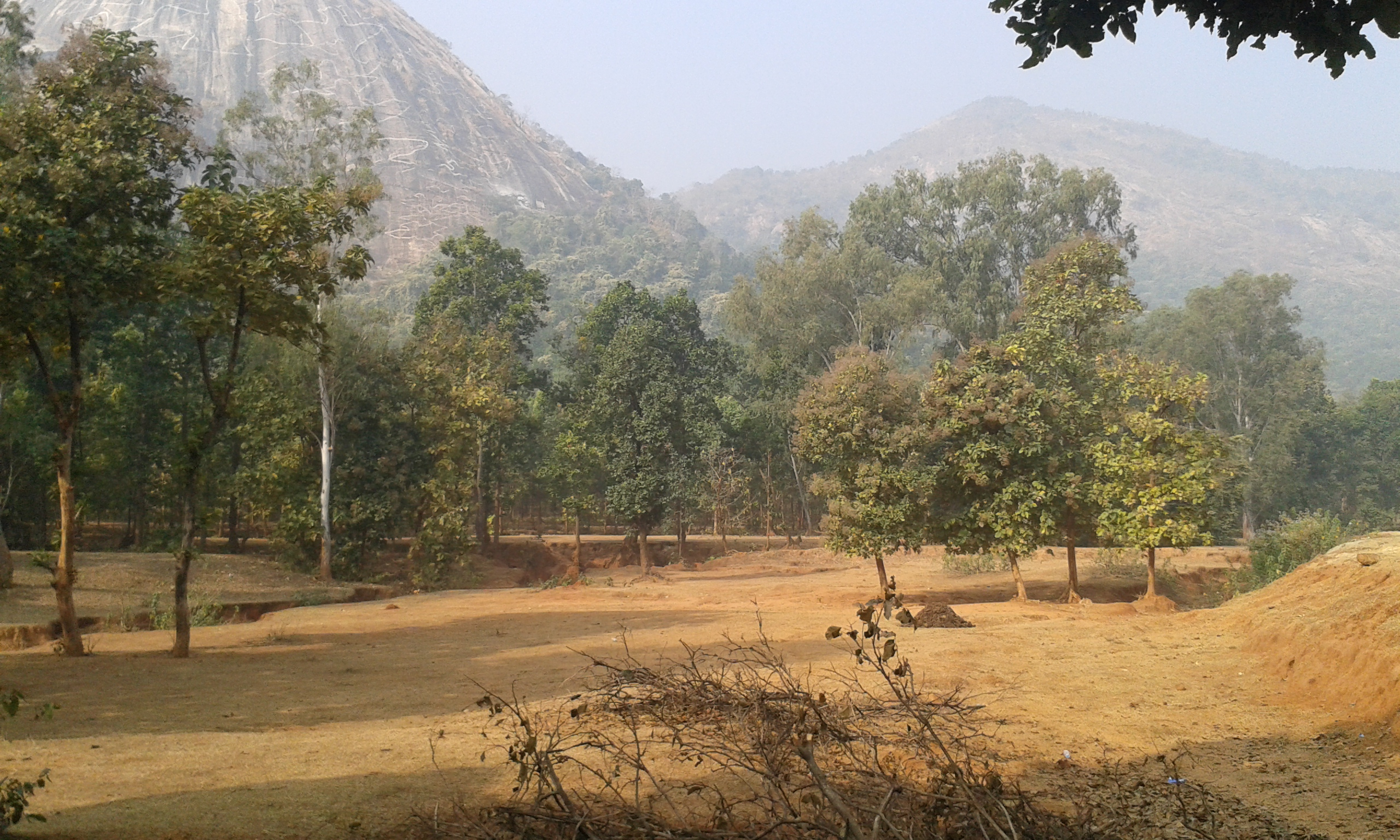
Ajodhya Hills located in Purulia district

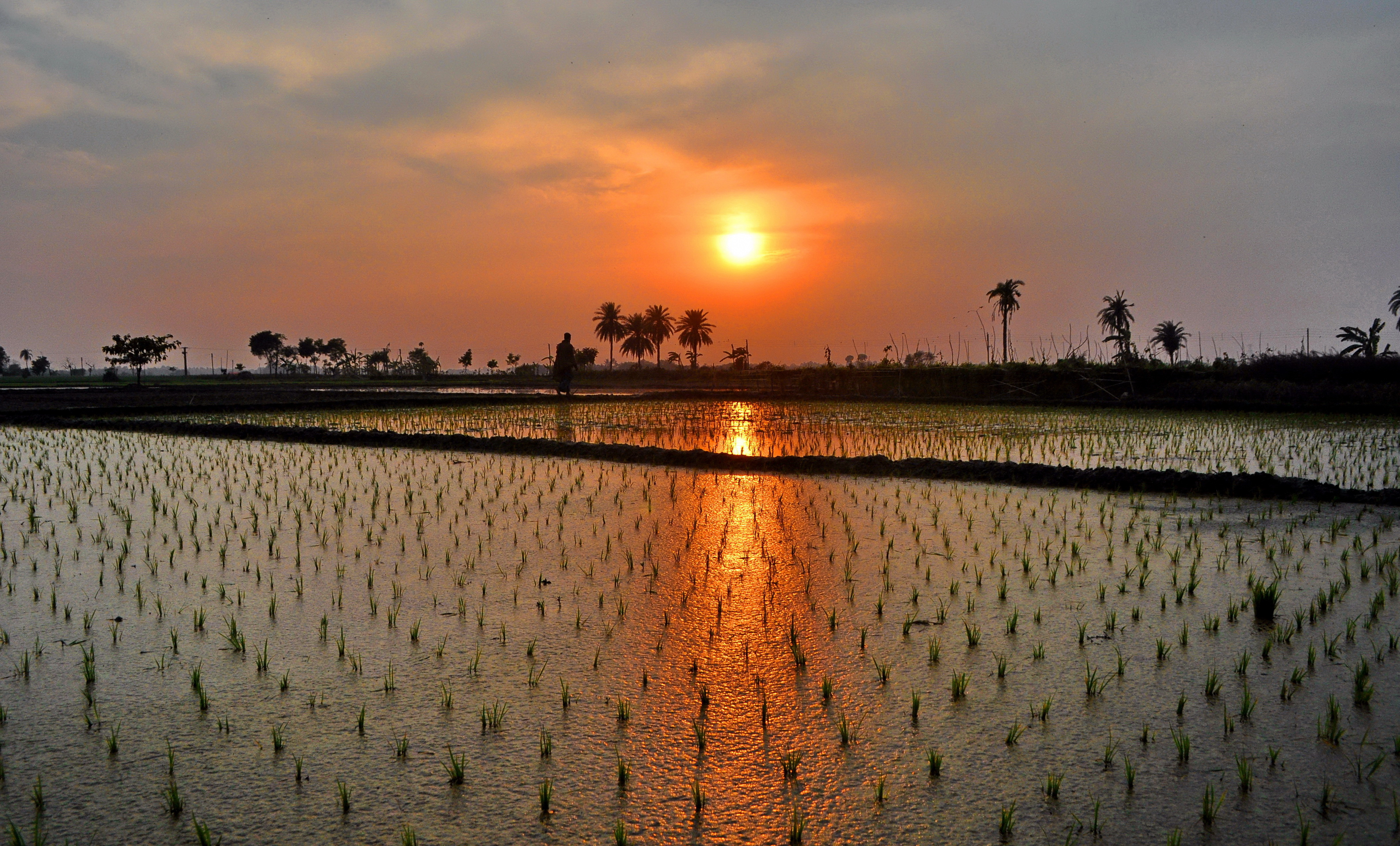
Bengal Indo-Gangetic Plain of Nadia district

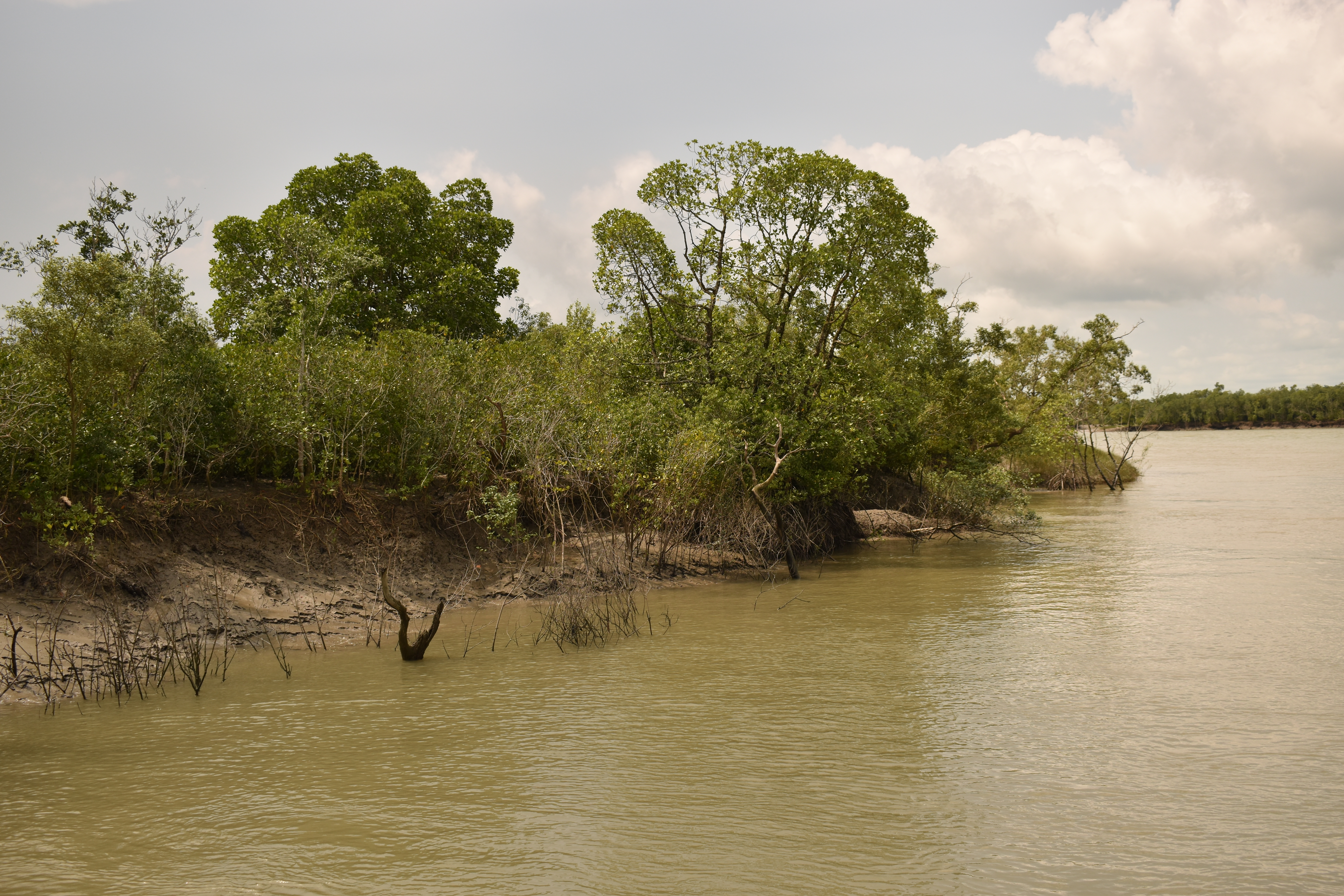
Sundarban mangrove region of South 24 Parganas district

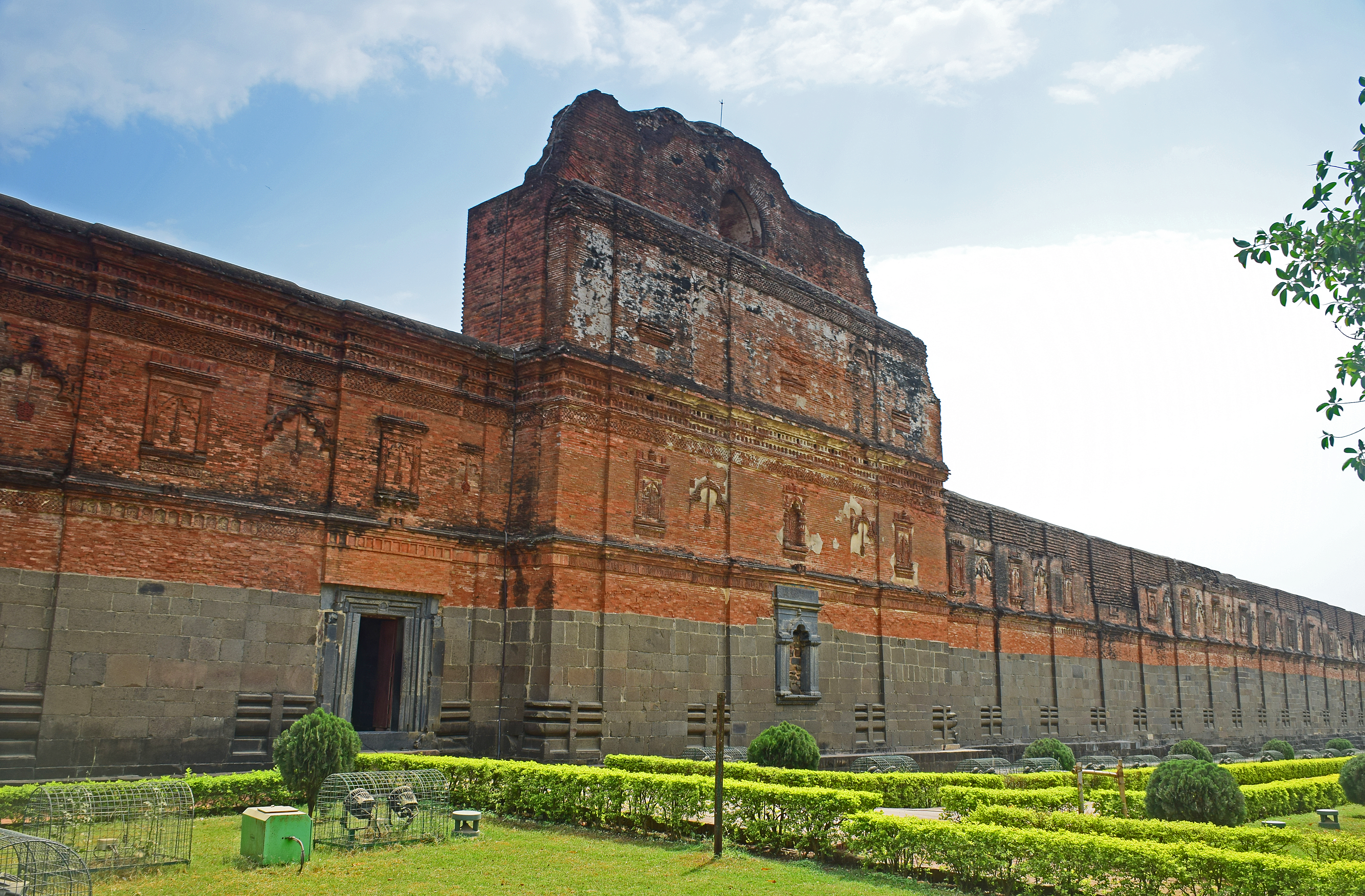
Adina Mosque at Malda district

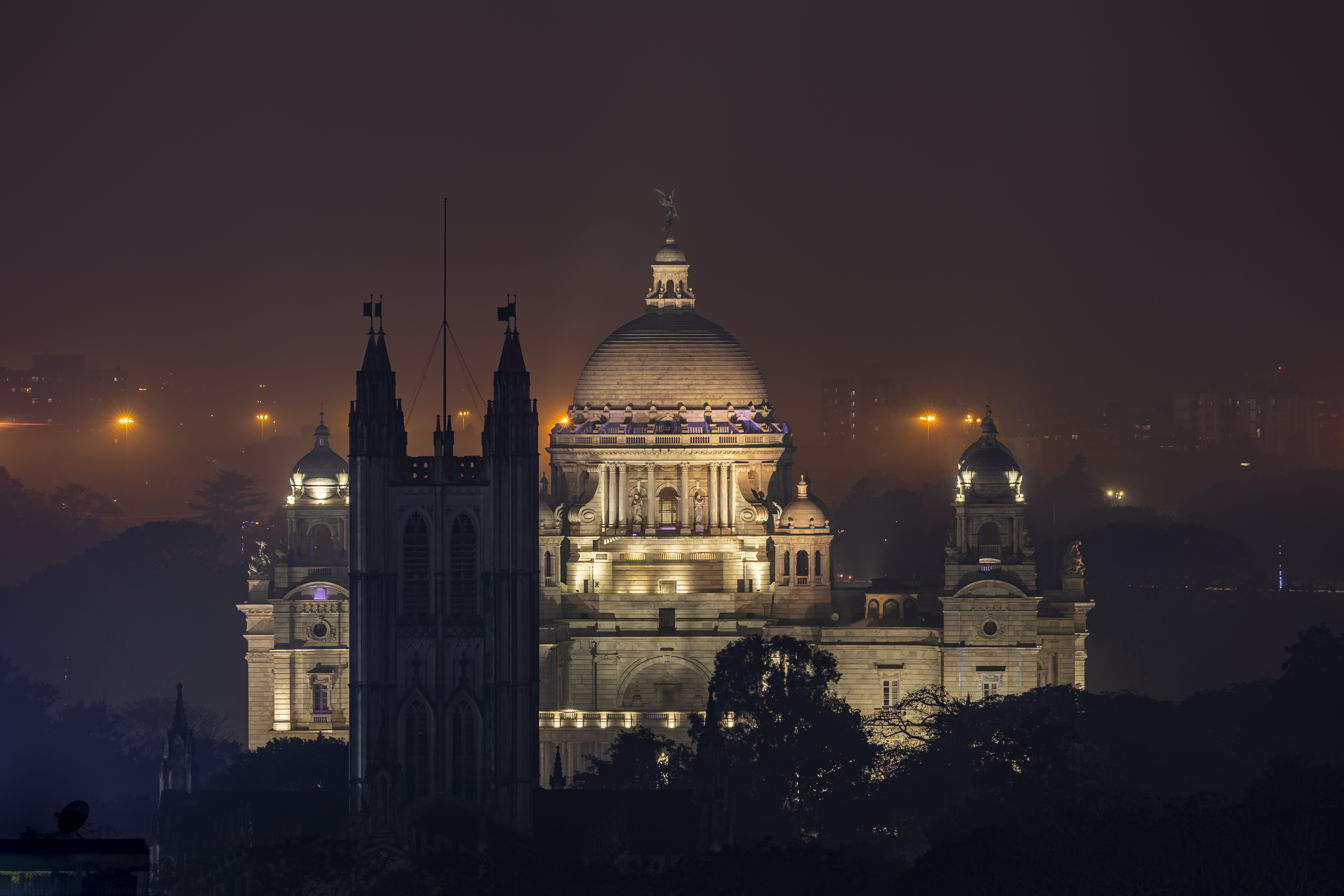
Kolkata district, capital region of West Bengal

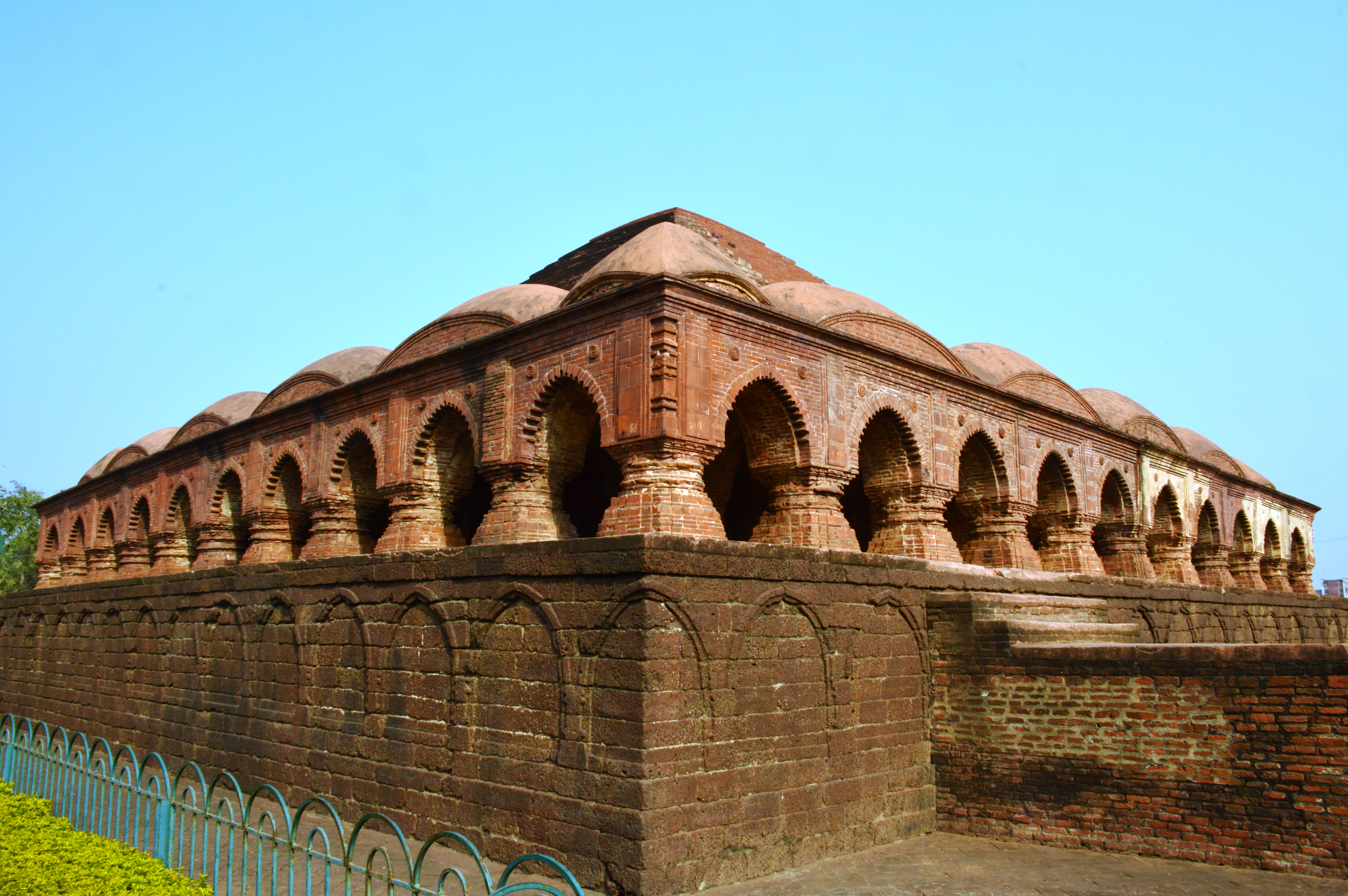
Bishnupur Rasmancha temple of Bankura district

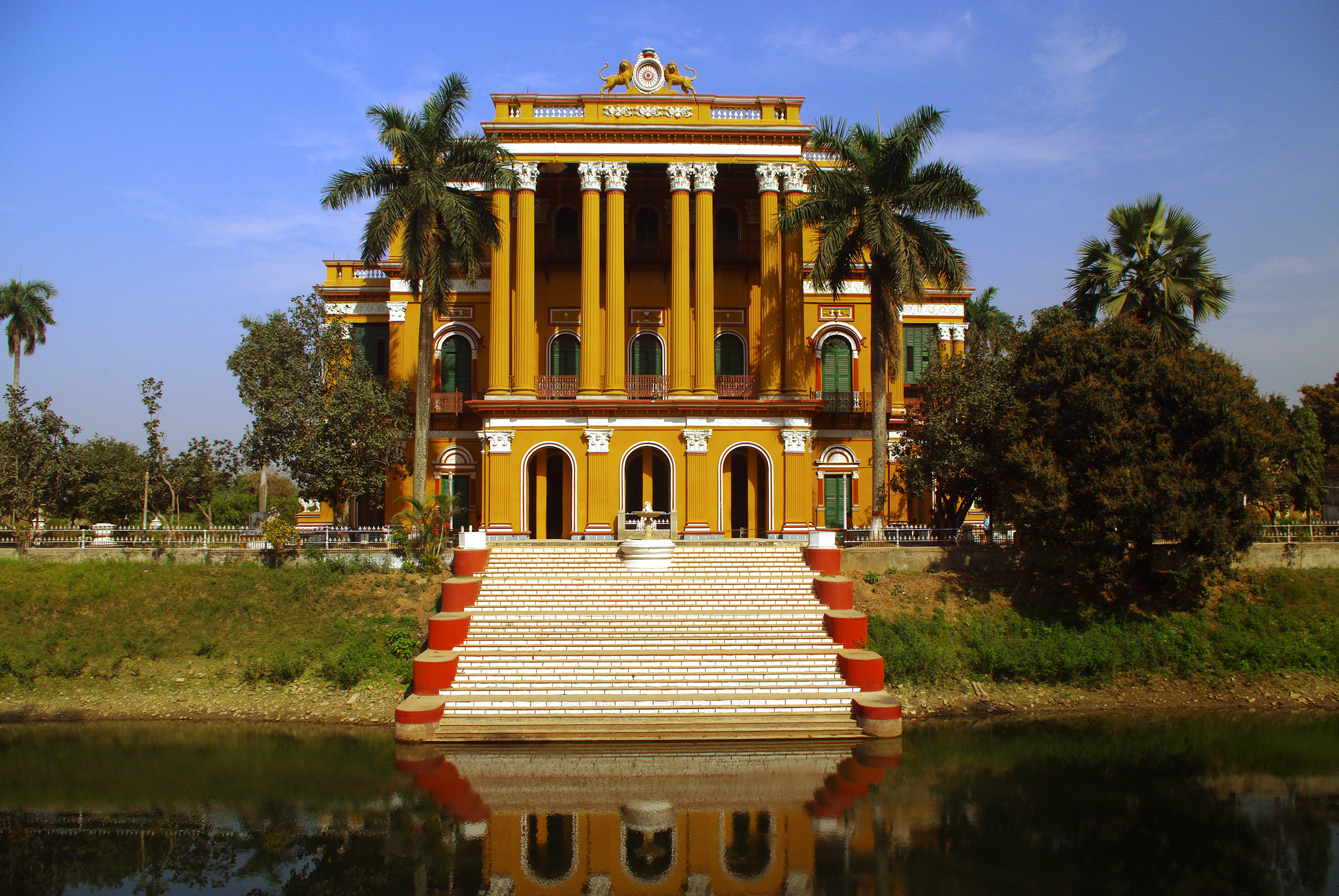
Kathgola Palace of Murshidabad district

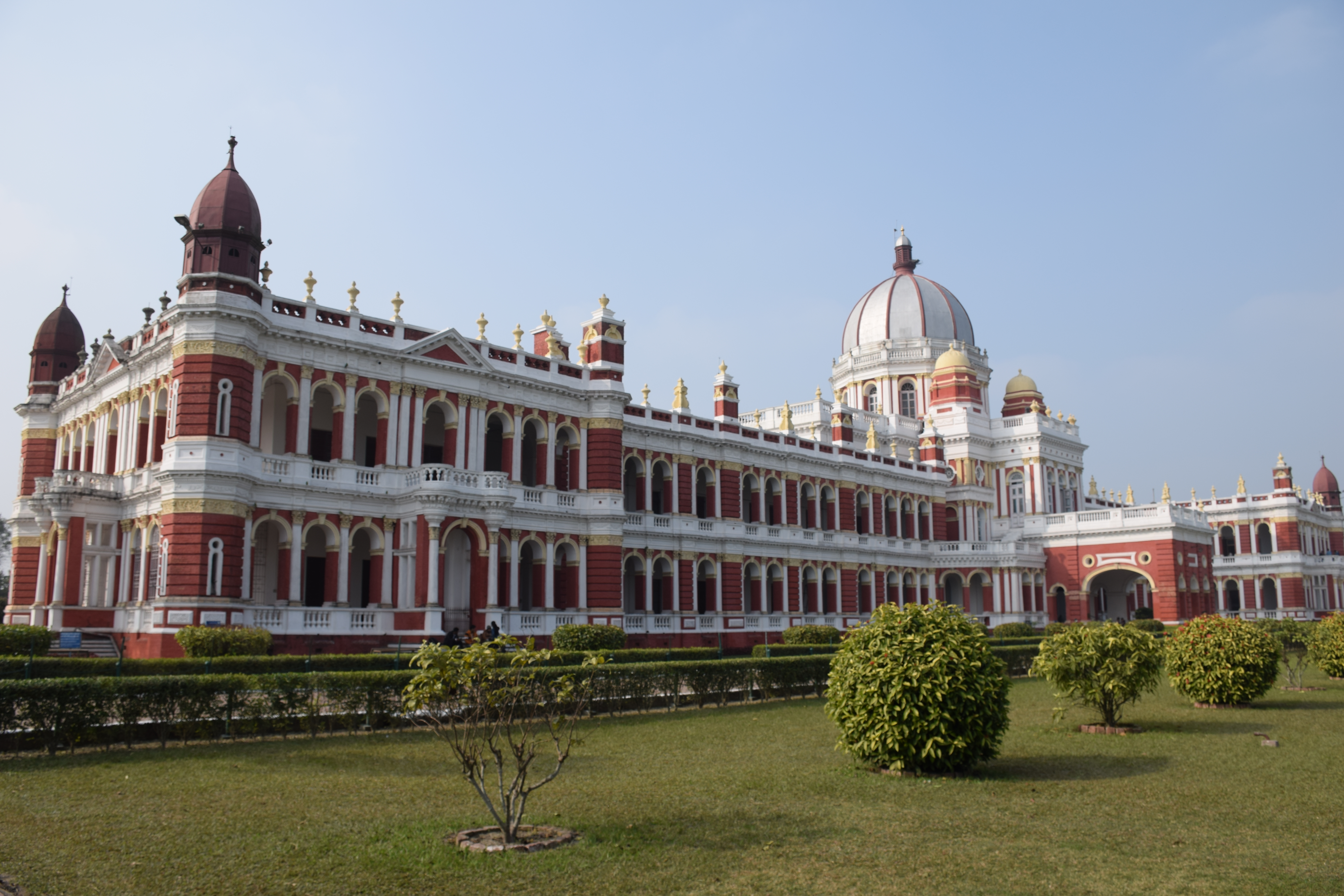
Cooch Behar Palace at Cooch behar district

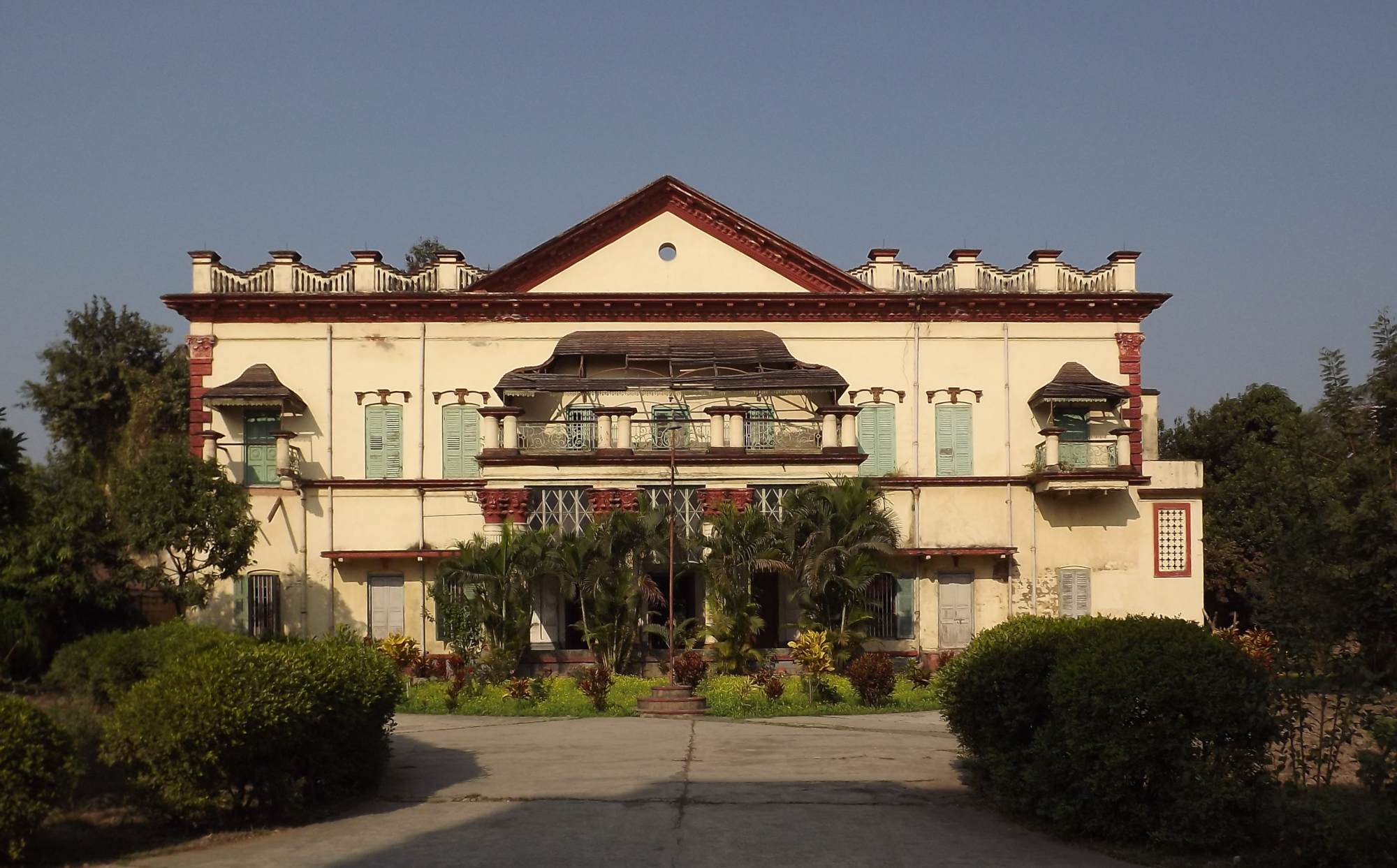
Chandannagar, former French colony at Hooghly district

West Bengal is bordered by three countries: Nepal, Bhutan and Bangladesh; and five Indian states: Sikkim, Bihar, Jharkhand, Odisha, and Assam. Sikkim and Bhutan are located to the north of the state, Nepal to the northwest, Bihar and Jharkhand in the west, Odisha in the southwest, the Bay of Bengal to the south, and Bangladesh and Assam are in the east. West Bengal is the only state of India that has both snowy mountains (Himalayas in the north) and sea beaches (on the coast of the Bay of Bengal in the south). In between them, the river Ganga enters the state from west, before it branches off into its main distributaries: the Hooghly River, which flows southwards to reach the Bay of Bengal, and the Padma River, which flows eastwards into Bangladesh.

The districts that are located at the north of the Ganga—Darjeeling, Jalpaiguri, Cooch Behar, Malda, Uttar Dinajpur, Dakshin Dinajpur, Alipurduar and Kalimpong — are often referred to collectively as North Bengal. Kalimpong is a newly added district of West Bengal. Geographically, this area is divided into the Darjeeling Himalayan hill region, the Terai and Dooars region, and the North Bengal plains. The Siliguri Corridor, also known as Chicken's Neck, which connects North-East India with rest of the India, lies in this region. The Indo-Bangladesh enclaves are either enclaves or exclaves of the Cooch Behar district or the Jalpaiguri district.

The districts on the south of the Ganges—Bankura, Paschim Bardhaman, Purba Bardhaman, Birbhum, Purulia, Murshidabad, Nadia, West Midnapore, Jhargram, East Midnapore, Hooghly, Howrah, Kolkata, North 24 Parganas and South 24 Parganas—constitute a variety of geographical regions such as the Rarh region, the Western plateau and high lands, the coastal plains, the Sunderbans and the Ganga Delta. Kolkata, the capital of the state, constitutes the Kolkata district.

The uninhabited South Talpatti Island, which surfaced in the Bay of Bengal in the 1970s near the Indo-Bangladesh border, is claimed by both India and Bangladesh.

== History ==
After India gained independence in 1947, the province of Bengal was partitioned along religious lines. The western part remained in India (and was named West Bengal) while the eastern part joined newly formed Pakistan as a province called East Pakistan (later giving rise to Bangladesh in 1971). At the time of its creation in 1947, the state of West Bengal was divided into 14 districts—Bankura, Birbhum, Burdwan, Calcutta (Kolkata), Darjeeling, Jalpaiguri, Hooghly, Howrah, Malda, Midnapore, Murshidabad, Nadia, West Dinajpur and 24 Parganas. Cooch Behar district was a princely state named Koch Bihar till 20 August 1949, when the state formally agreed to join India. Transfer of administration was started on 12 September 1949 and was completed on 19 January 1950, when Cooch Behar became a district of West Bengal. Chandannagar, which was earlier part of the French India, had voted to join India in a plebiscite in 1949. Formally, it joined India in 1952 and finally became a part of the Hooghly district of West Bengal on 2 October 1954. The States Reorganisation Act of 1956 reorganised boundaries of the Indian states along linguistic lines. As this act was implemented, the then West Dinajpur district was enlarged with the addition of some areas from Bihar, and the Purulia district was formed on 1 November 1956 from parts of the Manbhum district of Bihar.

Later, some large districts were divided into smaller districts. On 1 March 1986, the district of 24 Parganas was bifurcated into two districts—the North 24 Parganas district and the South 24 Parganas district. On 1 April 1992, the West Dinajpur district was bifurcated into the Uttar Dinajpur district and the Dakshin Dinajpur district. On 1 January 2002, the erstwhile Midnapore district was bifurcated into the Purba Medinipur district and the Paschim Medinipur district.

Since 2007, the demand for a separate Gorkhaland state has been revived by the Gorkha Janmukti Morcha and its supporters in the Darjeeling hills. The Kamtapur People's Party and its supporters' movement for a separate Kamtapur state that covers the North Bengal has also gained momentum in the 2000s.

== Administrative structure ==
Divisions of West Bengal

A district is governed by a District Collector, who is better known as a District Magistrate (DM) in the state of West Bengal. A DM is an officer from either Indian Administrative Service (IAS) or West Bengal Civil Service (WBCS), and is appointed by the State Government of West Bengal. Each district is divided into subdivisions, except the Kolkata district, which contains urban area only, administered by Kolkata Municipal Corporation. A subdivision is governed by a sub-divisional magistrate (SDM), better known as a Sub-Divisional Officer (SDO). Other than urban units such as town municipalities, a subdivision contains 'community development blocks' (also known as CD blocks or blocks or Tehsil or Taluka). A block consists of urban units such as census towns and rural units called gram panchayats. A block is administered by a Block Development Officer (BDO), who is similar as Tehsildar and who is appointed by the Government of West Bengal.

A gram panchayat, which consists of a group of villages, is administered by a village council headed by a Pradhan. As per the West Bengal Panchayat Act, 1973, each Block has a Panchayat Samiti, whose members include the Pradhans of the constituent gram panchayats, and the MLAs from the block. A Panchayat Samiti is headed by a Sabhapati. The third tier of the Panchayati Raj is Zilla Parishad, a district level organisation with the Sabhapatis of the constituent Panchayat Samitis and the MLAs from the district as its members. A Zilla Parishad is headed by a Sabhadhipati. For the Darjeeling district, the Zilla Parishad has ceased to exist, but a similar organisation for the Siliguri subdivision exists, which is designated as a Mahakuma Parishad.

The Gorkha Hill Council, formed in 1988, administers three (out of four) subdivisions of the Darjeeling district: Darjeeling Sadar, Kalimpong and Kurseong. Gorkha Hill Council manages the departments of Public Health, Education, Public Works, Transport, Tourism, Market, Small scale industries, Agriculture, Agricultural waterways, Forest (except reserved forests), Water, Livestock, Vocational Training and Sports and Youth services. District administration of Darjeeling, which is still responsible for election, panchayat, law and order, revenue etc., also acts as an interface between the Council and the State Government.

A District Superintendent of Police, better known as a Superintendent of Police, heads the District Police organisation of West Bengal Police. This is as per the Police Act of 1861, which is applicable to the whole of India. The Superintendents of Police are officers of the Indian Police Service. For every subdivision, there is a Subdivision Police, headed by a Police officer of the rank of Assistant Superintendent of Police or Deputy Superintendent of Police. Under subdivisions, there are Police Circles, each headed by an Inspector of Police. A Police Circle consists of Police Stations, each headed by an Inspector of Police, or in case of rural areas, by a Sub-Inspector of Police.

The Calcutta High Court has the jurisdiction of the state of West Bengal. Though most of the districts have more courts other than a District Court, not every subdivision of the state has a Court.

A group of districts forms a division, which is administered by a 'Divisional Commissioner'. West Bengal is now divided in twenty three districts, grouped under five divisions:

Malda division	Burdwan division	Jalpaiguri division	Presidency division	Medinipur division
Malda district; Uttar Dinajpur district; Dakshin Dinajpur district; Murshidabad district	Birbhum district; Hooghly district; Paschim Bardhaman district; Purba Bardhaman district	Alipurduar district; Cooch Behar district; Darjeeling district; Jalpaiguri district; Kalimpong district	Howrah district; Kolkata district; Nadia district; North 24 Parganas district; South 24 Parganas district	Bankura district; Jhargram district; Purulia district; Paschim Medinipur district; Purba Medinipur district

== List of districts ==
Sl no.	Code	District	Headquarters	Established	Subdivisions	Area	Population 2011	Population Density	Map
1	AD	Alipurduar	Alipurduar	2014	Alipurduar Sadar	3,136 km^{2} (1,211 sq mi)	1,491,250	441/km^{2} (1,140/sq mi)	
2	BN	Bankura	Bankura	1947	Bankura Sadar; Khatra; Bishnupur	6,882 km^{2} (2,657 sq mi)	3,596,674	523/km^{2} (1,350/sq mi)	
3	BR	Paschim Bardhaman	Asansol	2017	Asansol Sadar; Durgapur	1,603.17 km^{2} (618.99 sq mi)	2,882,031	1,798/km^{2} (4,660/sq mi)	
4	BR	Purba Bardhaman	Bardhaman	2017	Kalna; Katwa; Bardhaman Sadar North; Bardhaman Sadar South	5,432.69 km^{2} (2,097.57 sq mi)	4,835,532	890/km^{2} (2,300/sq mi)	
5	BI	Birbhum	Suri	1947	Suri Sadar; Bolpur; Rampurhat	4,545 km^{2} (1,755 sq mi)	3,502,404	771/km^{2} (2,000/sq mi)	
6	KB	Cooch Behar	Cooch Behar	1950	Cooch Behar Sadar; Dinhata; Mathabhanga; Mekhliganj; Tufanganj	3,387 km^{2} (1,308 sq mi)	2,819,086	833/km^{2} (2,160/sq mi)	
7	DA	Darjeeling	Darjeeling	1947	Darjeeling Sadar; Kurseong; Siliguri; Mirik	3,149 km^{2} (1,216 sq mi)	1,595,181	732/km^{2} (1,900/sq mi)	
8	DD	Dakshin Dinajpur	Balurghat	1992	Balurghat Sadar; Gangarampur	2,219 km^{2} (857 sq mi)	1,676,276	755/km^{2} (1,960/sq mi)	
9	HG	Hooghly	Chinsura	1947	Chinsurah Sadar; Chandannagore; Srirampore	3,149 km^{2} (1,216 sq mi)	5,519,145	1,753/km^{2} (4,540/sq mi)	
10	HR	Howrah	Howrah	1947	Howrah Sadar; Uluberia	1,467 km^{2} (566 sq mi)	4,850,029	3,306/km^{2} (8,560/sq mi)	
11	JP	Jalpaiguri	Jalpaiguri	1947	Jalpaiguri Sadar; Malbazar; Dhupguri	3,386 km^{2} (1,307 sq mi)	2,381,596	837/km^{2} (2,170/sq mi)	
12	JH	Jhargram	Jhargram	2017	Jhargram Sadar	3,037.64 km^{2} (1,172.84 sq mi)	1,136,548	374/km^{2} (970/sq mi)	
13	KO	Kolkata	Kolkata	1947	Kolkata	206.08 km^{2} (79.57 sq mi)	4,496,694	24,306/km^{2} (62,950/sq mi)	
14	KA	Kalimpong	Kalimpong	2017	Kalimpong Sadar	1,044 km^{2} (403 sq mi)	251,642	241/km^{2} (620/sq mi)	
15	MA	Malda	English Bazar	1947	Chanchal; Malda Sadar	3,733 km^{2} (1,441 sq mi)	3,988,845	1,069/km^{2} (2,770/sq mi)	
16	ME	Paschim Medinipur	Medinipur	2002	Kharagpur; Medinipur Sadar; Ghatal	6,308 km^{2} (2,436 sq mi)	4,776,909	757/km^{2} (1,960/sq mi)	
17	ME	Purba Medinipur	Tamluk	2002	Tamluk Sadar; Haldia; Egra; Contai	4,785 km^{2} (1,847 sq mi)	5,095,875	1,076/km^{2} (2,790/sq mi)	
18	MU	Murshidabad	Baharampur	1947	Barhampur Sadar; Domkol; Lalbag; Kandi	5,324 km^{2} (2,056 sq mi)	7,103,807	1,334/km^{2} (3,460/sq mi)	
19	NA	Nadia	Krishnanagar	1947	Krishnanagar Sadar; Kalyani; Ranaghat; Tehatta	3,927 km^{2} (1,516 sq mi)	5,167,601	1,316/km^{2} (3,410/sq mi)	
20	PN	North 24 Parganas	Barasat	1986	Barrackpore; Barasat Sadar; Bangaon; Bidhannagar	4,094 km^{2} (1,581 sq mi)	10,009,781	2,445/km^{2} (6,330/sq mi)	
21	PS	South 24 Parganas	Alipore	1986	Baruipur; Diamond Harbour; Alipore Sadar	9,960 km^{2} (3,850 sq mi)	8,161,961	819/km^{2} (2,120/sq mi)	
22	PU	Purulia	Purulia	1956	Purulia Sadar; Manbazar; Raghunathpur; Jhalda	6,259 km^{2} (2,417 sq mi)	2,930,115	468/km^{2} (1,210/sq mi)	
23	UD	Uttar Dinajpur	Raiganj	1992	Raiganj Sadar; Islampur	3,140 km^{2} (1,210 sq mi)	3,007,134	958/km^{2} (2,480/sq mi)	
24		Basirhat	Basirhat	2026	Basirhat	1,777.02 km^{2} (686.11 sq mi)	2,271,810	1,278.44/km^{2} (3,311.1/sq mi)	
25		Sundarbans	Jaynagar	2026	Canning; Kakdwip	3,497.7 km^{2} (1,350.5 sq mi)	3,335,448	953.61/km^{2} (2,469.8/sq mi)	
26		Jangipur	Jangipur	2026	Jangipur	1,097.82 km^{2} (423.87 sq mi)	1,972,308	1,796.57/km^{2} (4,653.1/sq mi)	
27		Arambagh	Arambagh	2026	Arambagh; Kamarpukur; Tarkeshwar	1,058.87 km^{2} (408.83 sq mi)	1,264,602	1,194.29/km^{2} (3,093.2/sq mi)	
—	Total	27	—	—	69	88,752 km^{2} (34,267 sq mi)	91,347,736	1,029/km^{2} (2,670/sq mi)	West Bengal located in India

== Demographics ==
The following is a list of the basic demographic data for the districts of West Bengal at the time of the 2011 census by their population rank in India

Rank	District (West Bengal)	Population (2011 census)	Bengali (Bangla) Speakers	Percentage (%) of Bengali Speakers	Growth Rate	Sex Ratio	Literacy	Density/KM
1	Uttar 24 Parganas	10,009,781	8,899,696	88.91%	12.86	955	84.53	2,445
2	Dakshin 24 Parganas	8,161,961	7,984,030	97.82%	18.17	956	77.51	819
3	Murshidabad	7,103,807	6,996,539	98.49%	21.09	958	66.59	1,334
4	Paschim Medinipur	5,913,457	5,153,577	87.15%	14.44	960	79.04	636
5	Hooghly	5,519,145	4,828,699	87.49%	9.49	958	82.55	1,753
6	Nadia	5,167,600	5,065,281	98.02%	12.24	947	75.58	1,316
7	Purba Medinipur	5,095,875	5,009,754	98.31%	15.32	936	87.66	1,076
8	Howrah	4,850,029	4,122,039	84.99%	13.31	935	83.85	3,300
9	Purba Bardhaman	4,841,632	4,495,939	92.86%	11.92	945	76.21	1,099
10	Kolkata	4,496,694	2,763,218	61.45%	−1.67	908	86.31	24,306
11	Malda	3,988,845	3,631,444	91.04%	21.50	939	62.71	1,071
12	Jalpaiguri	3,872,846	2,539,037	65.56%	13.77	954	73.79	621
13	Bankura	3,596,674	3,261,463	90.68%	12.64	954	70.95	523
14	Birbhum	3,502,404	3,235,520	92.38%	16.15	956	70.90	771
15	Uttar Dinajpur	3,007,134	2,046,655	68.06%	22.90	936	60.13	956
16	Purulia	2,930,115	2,360,500	80.56%	15.43	955	65.38	468
17	Paschim Bardhaman	2,882,031	1,676,765	58.18%	11.92	945	76.21	1,099
18	Cooch Behar	2,819,086	2,672,211	94.79%	13.86	942	75.49	833
19	Darjeeling	1,846,823	489,592	26.51%	14.47	971	79.92	585
20	Dakshin Dinajpur	1,676,276	1,414,944	84.41%	11.16	954	73.86	753

== Economy ==
The following is a list of basic economic data for the districts of West Bengal as of 2023–2024, the latest year for which data is available:

District	Real Economy (Nominal GDP Per Capita in 2023–2024)
Paschim Bardhaman	$3,500
Purba Bardhaman	$2,200
Birbhum	$1,600
Bankura	$1,900
Purba Medinipur	$2,800
Paschim Medinipur	$1,700
Howrah	$2,500
Hooghly	$2,400
Uttar 24 Parganas	$2,400
Dakshin 24 Parganas	$1,900
Kolkata	$4,400
Nadia	$1,900
Murshidabad	$1,600
Jalpaiguri	$1,900
Darjeeling	$3,000
Uttar Dinajpur	$1,200
Dakshin Dinajpur	$1,500
Malda	$1,600
Cooch Behar	$1,600
Purulia	$1,600
West Bengal	$2,400

== Proposals for new districts ==
- Demands and official proposals for administrative reorganization in West Bengal stem from the state's high population density and the extensive geographical footprint of its current districts. On 1 August 2022, the West Bengal state cabinet officially approved the creation of seven new districts to decentralize governance, which would theoretically increase the state's total from 23 to 30. However, as of 2026, these districts are yet to be formally notified and remain in the administrative restructuring phase.
- In addition to these cabinet-approved proposals, various elected representatives, local citizen bodies, and political groups maintain active demands for further decentralization across other high-density sub-divisions.
- On 22 June 2026, in West Bengal Legislative Assembly during the 2026-27 Budget in Badal Session the Finance Minister of the West Bengal State Government Shri Swapan Dasgupta announced the creation of 5 new districts : Kolkata, Basirhat, Sundarban, Jangipur & Arambagh.
- Kolkata District: According to the proposal, Kolkata will be reorganized into a full-fledged district and the entire area of the Kolkata Municipal Corporation will be included in the new Kolkata district. In addition, some municipal areas adjacent to Kolkata city such as Rajpur Sonarpur, Maheshtala and Bidhannagar are also being considered for inclusion in the proposed district.
- Bashirhat District: Basirhat sub-division
- Sundarban District: Canning sub-division, Kakdwip sub-division
- Jangipur District: Jangipur sub-division
- Arambagh district: Arambagh sub-division

List of Proposed Districts in West Bengal Grouped by Current District
Proposed District	Proposed HQ	Expected Area of Jurisdiction	Status
Proposed from Bankura
Bishnupur	Bishnupur	Bishnupur sub-division and surrounding blocks.	Cabinet approved (2022)
Proposed from Birbhum
Rampurhat	Rampurhat	Rampurhat sub-division.	Active demand
Proposed from Cooch Behar
Mathabhanga	Mathabhanga	Mathabhanga & Mekhliganj sub-division.	Active demand
Proposed from Darjeeling
Kurseong	Kurseong	Kurseong and Mirik sub-division.	Active demand
Siliguri	Siliguri	Siliguri sub-division and surrounding plains.	Active demand
Proposed from Hooghly
Serampore-Chandannagore	Srirampore	Srirampore and Chandannagore sub-division.	Active demand
Proposed from Howrah
Uluberia	Uluberia	Uluberia sub-division.	Active demand
Proposed from Malda
Chanchal	Chanchal	Chanchal sub-division.	Active demand
Proposed from Murshidabad
Berhampore	Berhampore	Baharampur sub-division and central blocks.	Cabinet approved (2022)
Kandi	Kandi	Kandi sub-division.	Active demand
Murshidabad(reorganized)	Murshidabad	Domkal and Lalbag sadar sub-division and central blocks.	Cabinet approved (2022)
Proposed from Nadia
Ranaghat	Ranaghat	Ranaghat & Kalyani sub-division	Cabinet approved (2022)
Proposed from North 24 Parganas
Barrackpore	Barrackpore	Barrackpore sub-division and dense urban corridors.	Active demand
Ichamati	Bangaon	Bangaon sub-division and surrounding riverine blocks.	Cabinet approved (2022)
Proposed from Paschim Medinipur
Ghatal	Ghatal	Ghatal sub-division.	Active demand
Proposed from Purba Bardhaman
Kalna	Kalna	Kalna sub-division.	Active demand
Katwa	Katwa	Katwa sub-division.	Active demand
Proposed from Purba Medinipur
Contai	Contai	Contai (Kanthi) & Egra sub-division and coastal blocks.	Active demand
Proposed from Purulia
Manbazar	Manbazar	Manbazar sub-division.	Active demand
Raghunathpur	Raghunathpur	Raghunathpur sub-division.	Active demand
Proposed from South 24 Parganas
Baruipur	Baruipur	Baruipur sub-division.	Active demand
Diamond Harbour	Diamond Harbour	Diamond Harbour & Kakdwip sub-division.	Active demand
Proposed from Uttar Dinajpur
Islampur	Islampur	Islampur sub-division and northern corridors.	Active demand

=== Proposals for reestablish the historical districts ===
Demands for renamed current districts
From time to time, several ministers and elected representatives, such as MLAs and MPs, have proposed reestablish the following historical districts:

Current District's Name	Current Headquarters	Proposed District's Name
Dakshin Dinajpur district	Balurghat	Balurghat district
Purba Bardhaman district	Bardhaman	Bardhaman district
Paschim Bardhaman district	Asansol	Asansol-Durgapur district
Purba Medinipur district	Tamluk	Tamluk district
Paschim Medinipur district	Medinipur	Midnapore district
Uttar Dinajpur district	Raiganj	Raiganj district
North 24 Parganas district	Barasat	Barasat district
South 24 Parganas district	Alipore	24 Parganas district or Alipore district

== Historical districts ==
- Bardhaman district
- Midnapore district
- West Dinajpur district
- 24 Parganas District

== See also ==
- Divisions of West Bengal
- List of subdivisions of West Bengal
- Administrative divisions of West Bengal
- List of cities in West Bengal by population
- List of RTO districts in West Bengal
- List of constituencies of the West Bengal Legislative Assembly
- Category:Community development blocks in West Bengal
- Category:Lok Sabha constituencies in West Bengal
