= Burdwan division =

Division in West Bengal, India

- Division
- Location of Burdwan division in West Bengal
- Coordinates: 23°22′N 87°58′E
- Country: India
- State: West Bengal
- Headquarters: Barddhaman

Government
  - Districts: Birbhum, Hooghly, Paschim Bardhaman, Purba Bardhaman
  - DC: Avanindra Singh, IAS
  - DIG: Shyam Singh, IPS

Area
  - Total: 14,730 km^{2} (5,690 sq mi)

Population (2011)
  - Total: 16,739,112
  - Density: 1,136/km^{2} (2,943/sq mi)

Languages
  - Official: Bengali
  - Additional official: English
- Time zone: UTC+05:30 (IST)
- Website: wb.gov.in

Burdwan division is one of the 5 administrative division in the Indian state of West Bengal. The headquarters of the Burdwan division is situated at Chinsurah while the largest city in this division is Asansol. This division is known for its huge reserve of coal, mainly in the districts of Paschim Bardhaman and Birbhum.

== Geography ==
Burdwan division is bounded by Medinipur division to West, Presidency division to South and South-East, Malda division to North-East and Santhal Pargana division of neighbouring Jharkhand to North-West. The northern and north-western part of the division have rocky undulating topography with laterite soil and is a sort of extension of the Chota Nagpur plateau. For ages the area was heavily forested and infested with plunderers and marauders. The discovery of coal in the 18th century led to industrialisation. On the other hand, the eastern, central and southern part of the division flat alluvial plain area with a significant number of rivers flowing through this area. The main rivers flowing through this division are Hooghly-Bhagirathi, Damodar, Ajay, Mayurakshi, Dwarakeswar River, Dwarka, Brahmani, etc.

== List of districts ==
It consists of 4 districts:

Arambagh District is upcoming soon

| Code | District | Headquarters | Established | Sub-Division | Area | Population As of 2011 | Population Density | Map |
|---|---|---|---|---|---|---|---|---|
| BR | Paschim Bardhaman | Asansol | 2017 | Asansol Sadar; Durgapur | 1,603.17 km^{2} (618.99 sq mi) | 2,882,031 | 1,100/km^{2} (2,800/sq mi) | |
| BR | Purba Bardhaman | Bardhaman | 2017 | Kalna; Katwa; Bardhaman Sadar North; Bardhaman Sadar South | 5,432.69 km^{2} (2,097.57 sq mi) | 4,835,532 | 890/km^{2} (2,300/sq mi) | |
| BI | Birbhum | Siuri | 1947 | Suri Sadar; Bolpur; Rampurhat | 4,545 km^{2} (1,755 sq mi) | 3,502,387 | 771/km^{2} (2,000/sq mi) | |
| HG | Hooghly | Chinsura | 1947 | Chinsurah Sadar; Chandannagore; Srirampore; Arambagh | 3,149 km^{2} (1,216 sq mi) | 5,520,389 | 1,753/km^{2} (4,540/sq mi) | |
| Total | 4 | — | - | 13 | 14,733.86 km^{2} (5,688.78 sq mi) | 16,739,112 | 1,136/km^{2} (2,940/sq mi) | |

== Economy ==
Coalmining in India first started in the Raniganj Coalfield. Presently, Eastern Coalfields has been producing around 30 million tonnes per annum from its open cast mines, it has been modernising its underground mines to produce around 10 million tonnes per annum from its underground mines.

The western and southern part of the division are highly industrialised. IISCO Steel Plant of Steel Authority of India at Burnpur has a crude steel production capacity of 2.5 million tonnes per year.

Chittaranjan Locomotive Works is one of the largest electric locomotive manufacturers in the world. Established in 1950, it produced steam locomotives up to 1972. Ballavpur Paper Mnfg. Ltd. (earlier Bengal Paper Mill) at Ballavpur started production in 2009 after revamp.

Durgapur Steel Plant of Steel Authority of India, set up in the fifties, has a rated capacity of 2.2 million tonnes of crude steel, after expansion and modernisation. The plant is consistently performing at beyond its rated capacity.

Amongst the industrial areas in the division are: Durgapur Industrial Area, Industrial Complex at Rajbandh, Industrial Estate at Kalyanpur, Asansol, Raniganj Industrial Estate, Panagarh Industrial Park, Aluminium and Non-Ferrous Metal Park and Salanpur Industrial Park.

The southern part of the district is known for jute cultivation, jute industry, and jute trade hub in the state. The jute mills are along the banks of the river Hooghly in Tribeni, Bhadreswar, Champdani and Sreerampur

Birbhum is a major centre of cottage industries. Perhaps the most notable cottage industry is a non-profit rural organisation named Amar Kutir. Other main industries in Birbhum are agriculture-based industries, textiles, forestry, arts and crafts. Sriniketan is noted for its dairy industry and as a forestry centre. Some of the notable forms of cottage industries of Birbhum include textile—especially cotton and locally harvested tussar silk, jute works, batik, kantha stitch, macramé (weaving by knotting threads), leather, pottery and terracotta, solapith, woodcarving, bamboo and cane craft, metal works and tribal crafts. There are 8,883 small and medium scale industries. Principal industries of the district include cotton and silk harvesting and weaving, rice and oilseed milling, lac harvesting, and metalware and pottery manufacture. Bakreshwar Thermal Power Station (210 MW x 3 + 210 MW x 2 under construction) is the only heavy industry in the district.

Purba Bardhaman is an agriculturally prosperous district of West Bengal. The soil and climate of the district favour the production of food grains. The undivided Bardhaman district was the largest producer of rice in West Bengal, and the bulk of it was produced in what is now Purba Bardhaman district. Rice, the major crop has three varieties – Aus (in autumn), Aman (in winter) and Boro (in summer). Other than cereals and pulses, cash crops such as mustard, til, jute and potatoes are also grown.

== Demographics ==
Religion in Burdwan Division (2011 Indian Census)
1. Hinduism (76.3%)
2. Islam (22.5%)
3. Others or no religion (1.23%)

Hindus form the majority of the population in this division. They comprise 76.26% of the population. Muslims comprises 22.51% of the division. They are mainly concentrated in Rampurhat subdivision of Birbhum and in Purba Bardhaman district. Small presence of tribal population is also found in certain pockets of the division, specially in Birbhum district.
