= Jalpaiguri division =

Division in West Bengal, India

- Division
- Location of Jalpaiguri division in West Bengal
- Coordinates: 26°41′N 88°45′E
- Country: India
- State: West Bengal
- Headquarters: Jalpaiguri

Government
  - Districts: Alipurduar, Cooch Behar, Darjeeling, Jalpaiguri, Kalimpong
  - DC: Anoop Kumar Aggarwal, IAS
  - DIG: Nimbalkar Santosh Uttamrao, IPS

Area
  - Total: 12,713 km^{2} (4,909 sq mi)

Population (2011)
  - Total: 8,538,755
  - Density: 671.66/km^{2} (1,739.6/sq mi)

Languages
  - Official: Bengali
  - Additional official: English
- Time zone: UTC+05:30 (IST)
- Website: wb.gov.in

Jalpaiguri division is one of the 5 divisions in the Indian state of West Bengal. It is the northernmost division of West Bengal. It is surrounded by Nepal to the west, Bihar on the south-western side, Bhutan to the north and Bangladesh to the south.

== Districts ==
Districts of West Bengal

It consists of 5 districts:

Code	District	Headquarters	Established	Sub-Division	Area	Population As of 2011	Population Density	Map
DA	Darjeeling	Darjeeling	1947	Darjeeling Sadar; Kurseong; Siliguri; Mirik	2,092.5 km^{2} (807.9 sq mi)	1,797,422	859/km^{2} (2,220/sq mi)	
JP	Jalpaiguri	Jalpaiguri	1947	Jalpaiguri Sadar; Malbazar; Dhupguri	2,844 km^{2} (1,098 sq mi)	2,172,846	621/km^{2} (1,610/sq mi)	
KB	Cooch Behar	Cooch Behar	1950	Cooch Behar Sadar; Dinhata; Mathabhanga; Mekhliganj; Tufanganj	3,387 km^{2} (1,308 sq mi)	2,822,780	833/km^{2} (2,160/sq mi)	
AD	Alipurduar	Alipurduar	2014	Alipurduar Sadar	3,383 km^{2} (1,306 sq mi)	1,700,000	400/km^{2} (1,000/sq mi)	
KA	Kalimpong	Kalimpong	2017	Kalimpong Sadar	1,044 km^{2} (403 sq mi)	251,642	239/km^{2} (620/sq mi)	
Total	5	—	-	13	12,713 km^{2} (4,909 sq mi)	8,790,397	691/km^{2} (1,790/sq mi)	

== Demographics ==
Religion in Jalpaiguri division
Hinduism	77.43%
Islam	14.88%
Christianity	3.89%
Buddhism	3.05%
Others	0.75%

Hindus forms the majority of the population while Muslims forms the largest minority group. There is a significant Christian and Buddhist population in the division. They are mainly concentrated in Kalimpong district and hill subdivisions of Darjeeling district. The Dooars regions also has a significant tribal population.

=== Languages ===
Bengali is the predominant language of the region, spoken by 72.2% of the population, followed by Nepali, Rajbanshi, Sadri, Kurukh, and Hindi. Bengali speakers form the majority in the districts of Jalpaiguri, Cooch Behar, and Alipurduar, While Nepali speakers are significant in Darjeeling, but don't form a majority, and in Kalimpong, forms the largest group.
