= Malda division =

Division in West Bengal, India

- Division
- Location of Malda division in West Bengal
- Coordinates: 25°06′N 88°06′E
- Country: India
- State: West Bengal
- Headquarters: Malda

Government
  - Districts: Dakshin Dinajpur; Malda; Murshidabad; Uttar Dinajpur
  - DC: Md.Ghulam Ali Ansari, IAS
  - IGP: Dip Narayan Goswami, IPS

Area
  - Total: 14,418 km^{2} (5,567 sq mi)

Population (2011)
  - Total: 15,773,557
  - Density: 1,094.0/km^{2} (2,833.5/sq mi)

Languages
  - Official: Bengali
  - Additional official: English
- Time zone: UTC+05:30 (IST)
- Website: wb.gov.in

Malda division, also known as Gaur Banga, is an administrative division within the Indian state of West Bengal. This division was earlier a part of Jalpaiguri division and Presidency division.It was carved out in 2016. The headquarters and the largest city of the Malda Division is Malda. The office of divisional commissioner is temporary located in old circuit house at B. G. Road, Malda.

== Districts ==
It consists of 4 districts:

Code	District	Headquarters	Area	Population As of 2011	Population Density	Map
MA	Malda	Malda	3,733 km^{2}(1,441 sq mi)	3,997,970	1,100/km^{2} (2,800/sq mi)	
MU	Murshidabad	Baharampur	5,324 km^{2}(2,056 sq mi)	7,103,807	1,334/km^{2} (3,460/sq mi)	
ND	Uttar Dinajpur	Raiganj	3,142 km^{2} (1,213 sq mi)	3,000,849	960/km^{2} (2,500/sq mi)	
SD	Dakshin Dinajpur	Balurghat	2,219 km^{2} (857 sq mi)	1, 670,931	750/km^{2} (2,000/sq mi)	
Total	4	—	14,418 km2 (5,567 sq mi)	15,773,557	4,177 km2 (10,760/sq mi)	

== Demographics ==
Religion in Malda Division (2011 Indian Census)
1. Islam (60.9%)
2. Hinduism (38.2%)
3. Others or no religion (0.80%)

District	Muslim	Hindu	Other
Malda	51.27	47.99	0.74
Murshidabad	66.27	33.21	0.52
Uttar Dinajpur	49.92	49.31	0.77
Dakshin Dinajpur	24.63	73.55	1.82

Malda division is the only division of West Bengal where Muslims forms the majority of the population. Muslims numbering 9,612,405, comprises 60.94% of the population, whereas Hindus numbering 6,025,498, forms 38.20% of the division's population.

== See also ==
- Administrative divisions of West Bengal
