= Presidency division =

Division in West Bengal, India

- Division
- Location of Presidency division in West Bengal
- Coordinates: 22°34′22″N 88°21′50″E
- Country: India
- State: West Bengal
- Established: 1829
- Headquarters: Kolkata

Government
  - Districts: Howrah, Kolkata, Nadia, North 24 Paraganas, South 24 Parganas
  - DC: Jagdish Prasad Meena, IAS
  - DIG: Akash Magharia, IPS

Area
  - Total: 20,654 km^{2} (7,975 sq mi)

Population (2011)
  - Total: 32,741,224
  - Density: 1,585.2/km^{2} (4,105.7/sq mi)

Languages
  - Official: Bengali
  - Additional official: English
- Time zone: UTC+05:30 (IST)
- Website: wb.gov.in

Presidency division is an administrative division within the Indian state of West Bengal. The headquarters and the largest city of the Presidency division is Kolkata, the state capital. Presidency division is bounded by Medinipur division to southwest, Burdwan division to northwest and Malda division to north. The whole east side of the division is covered by India–Bangladesh border.

== Geography ==
=== Districts ===
It consists of 5 districts:

Code	District	Headquarters	Established	Subdivisions	Area	Population 2011	Population Density	Map
HR	Howrah	Howrah	1947	Howrah Sadar; Uluberia	1,467 km^{2} (566 sq mi)	4,850,029	3,306/km^{2} (8,560/sq mi)	
KO	Kolkata	Kolkata	1947	—	185 km^{2} (71 sq mi)	4,486,679	24,252/km^{2} (62,810/sq mi)	
NA	Nadia	Krishnanagar	1947	Krishnanagar Sadar; Kalyani; Ranaghat; Tehatta	3,927 km^{2} (1,516 sq mi)	5,168,488	1,316/km^{2} (3,410/sq mi)	
PN	North 24 Parganas	Barasat	1986	Barrackpore; Barasat Sadar; Bangaon; Basirhat; Bidhannagar	4,094 km^{2} (1,581 sq mi)	10,082,852	2,463/km^{2} (6,380/sq mi)	
PS	South 24 Parganas	Alipore	1986	Baruipur; Canning; Diamond Harbour; Kakdwip; Alipore Sadar	9,960 km^{2} (3,850 sq mi)	8,153,176	819/km^{2} (2,120/sq mi)	
Total	—	—	—	23	24,957 km^{2} (9,636 sq mi)	32,741,224	1,312/km^{2} (3,400/sq mi)	

== Demographics ==
According to the 2011 census of India, Presidency Division had a population of 32,741,224, roughly equals to the population of Malaysia or the US state of California.

With a population of about 33 million, Presidency Division is the most-populous second-level country subdivision in the world, as well as the most populous division of India and West Bengal.

=== Religions ===
Religions in Presidency Division (2011)
1. Hinduism (70.9%)
2. Islam (27.7%)
3. Other religion or irreligion (1.41%)

Hindus form the majority of the population. Muslims form the largest minority in this division. They are mainly concentrated in Basirhat subdivision of Uttar 24 Pargana district, Tehatta subdivision and Krishnanagar Sadar subdivision of Nadia district and Diamond Harbour subdivision and Baruipur subdivision of Dakshin 24 Pargana district.
