= Administrative divisions of West Bengal =

Regional divisions in West Bengal

The Indian state of West Bengal is divided into five administrative Divisions, namely:

- Presidency division
- Medinipur division
- Burdwan division
- Malda division
- Jalpaiguri division

A group of districts forms a division, which is administered by a 'Divisional Commissioner'. West Bengal is now divided in 23 districts, grouped under five divisions:

Presidency division	Medinipur division	Burdwan division	Malda division	Jalpaiguri division
Howrah district; Kolkata district; Nadia district; North 24 Parganas district; South 24 Parganas district	Bankura district; Jhargram district; Paschim Medinipur district; Purba Medinipur district; Purulia district	Birbhum district; Paschim Bardhaman district; Purba Bardhaman district; Hooghly district	Dakshin Dinajpur district; Malda district; Murshidabad district; Uttar Dinajpur district	Alipurduar district; Cooch Behar district; Darjeeling district; Jalpaiguri district; Kalimpong district

== See also ==
- List of subdivisions of West Bengal
- List of districts of West Bengal
- Cities and towns in West Bengal
