= List of subdivisions of West Bengal =

Subdivision is an administrative unit below district level and above the block or Tehsil level in the state West Bengal of India. Presently there are 69 subdivisions in 23 districts of West Bengal. Subdivisions are a group of blocks and it is administered by Sub-divisional Officer (SDO) also called as Sub-divisional Magistrate (SDM).

== List of Subdivisions and CD Blocks ==
Districts	Subdivisions	CD Blocks	Map of subdivisions with CD Blocks
Alipurduar	Alipurduar	Alipurduar I; Alipurduar II; Falakata; Kalchini; Kumargram; Madarihat-Birpara	
Bankura	Bankura Sadar	Bankura I; Bankura II; Barjora; Chhatna; Gangajalghati; Mejia; Onda; Saltora	
Bankura	Bishnupur		
Bankura	Khatra		
Birbhum	Bolpur		
Birbhum	Rampurhat		
Birbhum	Suri Sadar		
Cooch Behar	Cooch Behar Sadar		
Cooch Behar	Dinhata		
Cooch Behar	Mathabhanga		
Cooch Behar	Mekhliganj		
Cooch Behar	Tufanganj		
Dakshin Dinajpur	Balurghat		
Dakshin Dinajpur	Gangarampur		
Darjeeling	Darjeeling Sadar		
Darjeeling	Kurseong		
Darjeeling	Mirik		
Darjeeling	Siliguri		
Hooghly	Arambag	1. Arambagh; 2. Goghat I 3. Goghat II; 4. Khanakul I 5. Khanakul II; 6. Pursurah	
Hooghly	Chandannagore	1. Singur; 2. Haripal; 3. Tarkeshwar	
Hooghly	Chinsurah Sadar	1. Chinsurah-Mogra; 2. Polba-Dadpur; 3. Dhaniakhali; 4. Pandua; 5. Balagarh	
Hooghly	Srirampore	1. Serampore Uttarpara; 2. Chanditala I 3. Chanditala II; 4. Jangipara	
Howrah	Howrah Sadar		
Howrah	Uluberia		
Jalpaiguri	Jalpaiguri Sadar		
Jalpaiguri	Malbazar		
Jalpaiguri	Dhupguri		
Kalimpong	Kalimpong		
Jhargram	Jhargram		
Jhargram	Gopiballavpur (Note: not yet created, just announce by the government of West Bengal)		
Kolkata	None		
Malda	Chanchal		
Malda	Malda Sadar		
Murshidabad	Berhampore		
Murshidabad	Domkal		
Murshidabad	Jangipur		
Murshidabad	Kandi		
Murshidabad	Lalbag		
Nadia	Kalyani		
Nadia	Krishnanagar Sadar		
Nadia	Ranaghat		
Nadia	Tehatta		
North 24 Parganas	Bangaon		
North 24 Parganas	Barasat Sadar		
North 24 Parganas	Barrackpore		
North 24 Parganas	Basirhat		
North 24 Parganas	Bidhannagar		
Paschim Bardhaman	Asansol Sadar		
Paschim Bardhaman	Durgapur subdivision		
Paschim Medinipur	Ghatal		
Paschim Medinipur	Kharagpur		
Paschim Medinipur	Medinipur Sadar		
Purba Bardhaman	Bardhaman Sadar North		
Purba Bardhaman	Bardhaman Sadar South		
Purba Bardhaman	Kalna		
Purba Bardhaman	Katwa		
Purba Medinipur	Contai		
Purba Medinipur	Egra		
Purba Medinipur	Haldia		
Purba Medinipur	Tamluk		
Purulia	Jhalda		
Purulia	Manbazar		
Purulia	Purulia Sadar		
Purulia	Raghunathpur		
South 24 Parganas	Alipore Sadar		
South 24 Parganas	Baruipur		
South 24 Parganas	Canning		
South 24 Parganas	Diamond Harbour		
South 24 Parganas	Kakdwip		
Uttar Dinajpur	Islampur		
Uttar Dinajpur	Raiganj		

== See also ==
- Districts of West Bengal
- Divisions of West Bengal
