= List of constituencies of the West Bengal Legislative Assembly =

West Bengal Legislative Assembly Paschim Banga Vidhan Sabha
- 18th West Bengal Assembly

Type
- Type: Unicameral
- Term limits: 5 years

Elections
- Voting system: First past the post
- Last election: 2026
- Next election: 2031

Meeting place
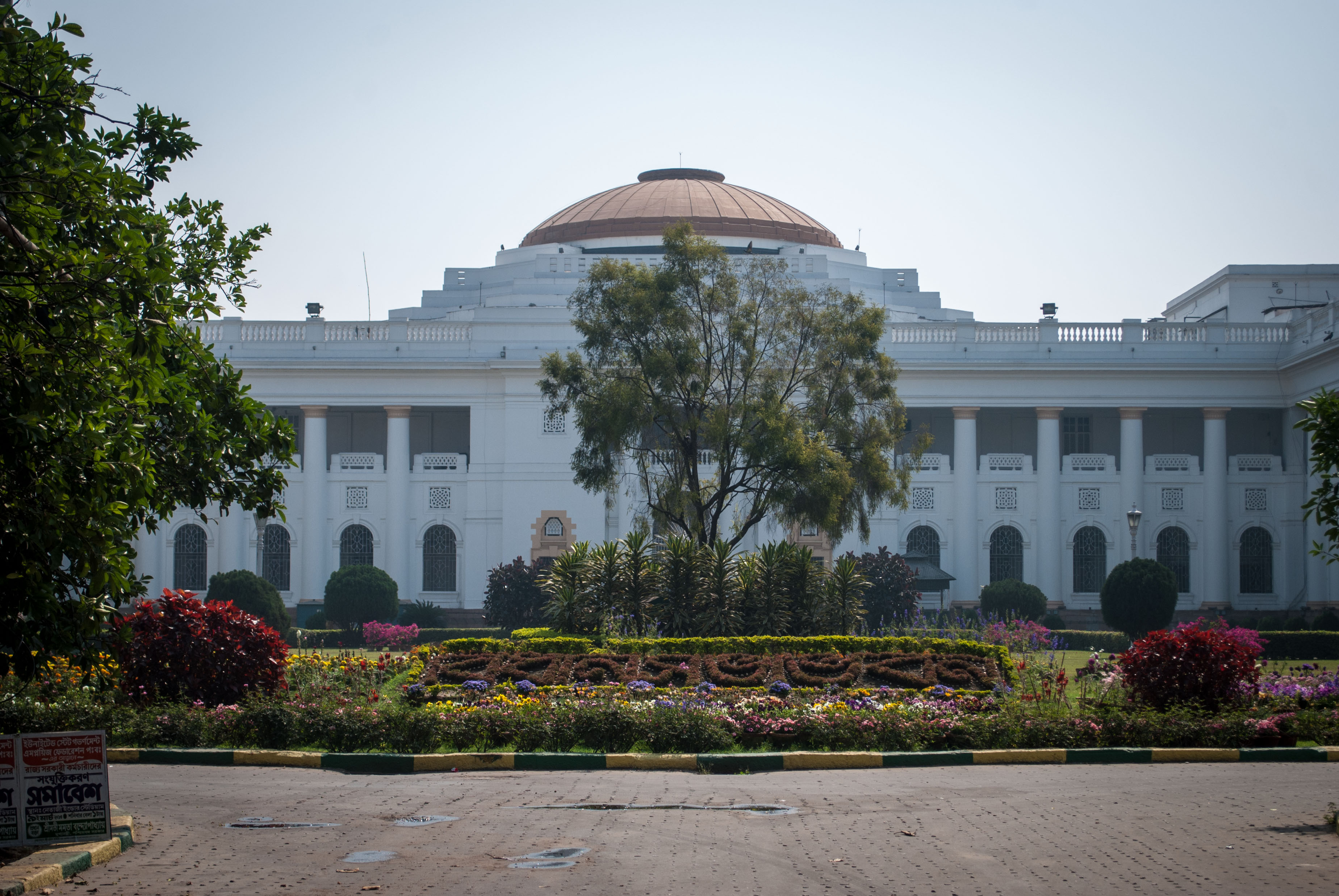
- Vidhan Sabha, Kolkata, West Bengal

Website
- www.wbassembly.gov.in

Footnotes
- The Assembly was established in 1862 for the Bengal Presidency. The Presidency became the state of West Bengal in the Republic of India in 1950; the state of West Bengal in its current state was formed on 1 May 1960.

The West Bengal Legislative Assembly is the unicameral legislature of the Indian state of West Bengal. It is located in the B. B. D. Bagh area of Kolkata. Members of the Legislative assembly are directly elected by the people. The legislative assembly comprises 294 Members of Legislative Assembly, all directly elected from single-seat constituencies. Its term is five years, unless sooner dissolved.

== Constituencies ==
Map of assembly constituencies in West Bengal

The constituencies in the West Bengal are as follows:

No.	Name	Reserved for (SC/ST)	District	Lok Sabha Constituency	Electors (2026)
1	Mekliganj	SC	Cooch Behar	Jalpaiguri	224,413
2	Mathabhanga	SC	Cooch Behar	Cooch Behar	248,757
3	Cooch Behar Uttar	SC	Cooch Behar	Cooch Behar	263,078
4	Cooch Behar Dakshin		Cooch Behar	Cooch Behar	213,968
5	Sitalkuchi	SC	Cooch Behar	Cooch Behar	285,548
6	Sitai	SC	Cooch Behar	Cooch Behar	273,126
7	Dinhata		Cooch Behar	Cooch Behar	277,291
8	Natabari		Cooch Behar	Cooch Behar	239,923
9	Tufanganj		Cooch Behar	Alipurduars	237,667
10	Kumargram	ST	Alipurduar	Alipurduars	259,496
11	Kalchini	ST	Alipurduar	Alipurduars	221,457
12	Alipurduars		Alipurduar	Alipurduars	244,331
13	Falakata	SC	Alipurduar	Alipurduars	245,264
14	Madarihat	ST	Alipurduar	Alipurduars	193,958
15	Dhupguri	SC	Jalpaiguri	Jalpaiguri	258,127
16	Maynaguri	SC	Jalpaiguri	Jalpaiguri	258,545
17	Jalpaiguri	SC	Jalpaiguri	Jalpaiguri	250,381
18	Rajganj	SC	Jalpaiguri	Jalpaiguri	230,795
19	Dabgram-Phulbari		Jalpaiguri	Jalpaiguri	264,380
20	Mal	ST	Jalpaiguri	Jalpaiguri	237,452
21	Nagrakata	ST	Jalpaiguri	Alipurduars	220,118
22	Kalimpong		Kalimpong	Darjeeling	201,619
23	Darjeeling		Darjeeling	Darjeeling	207,716
24	Kurseong		Darjeeling	Darjeeling	216,152
25	Matigara-Naxalbari	SC	Darjeeling	Darjeeling	268,480
26	Siliguri		Darjeeling	Darjeeling	200,779
27	Phansidewa	ST	Darjeeling	Darjeeling	217,298
28	Chopra		Uttar Dinajpur	Darjeeling	219,236
29	Islampur		Uttar Dinajpur	Raiganj	202,217
30	Goalpokhar		Uttar Dinajpur	Raiganj	199,468
31	Chakulia		Uttar Dinajpur	Raiganj	216,095
32	Karandighi		Uttar Dinajpur	Raiganj	231,599
33	Hemtabad	SC	Uttar Dinajpur	Raiganj	246,530
34	Kaliaganj	SC	Uttar Dinajpur	Raiganj	268,281
35	Raiganj		Uttar Dinajpur	Raiganj	174,126
36	Itahar		Uttar Dinajpur	Balurghat	211,422
37	Kushmandi	SC	Dakshin Dinajpur	Balurghat	205,867
38	Kumarganj		Dakshin Dinajpur	Balurghat	180,385
39	Balurghat		Dakshin Dinajpur	Balurghat	166,912
40	Tapan	ST	Dakshin Dinajpur	Balurghat	194,914
41	Gangarampur	SC	Dakshin Dinajpur	Balurghat	200,146
42	Harirampur		Dakshin Dinajpur	Balurghat	211,295
43	Habibpur	ST	Maldah	Maldaha Uttar	238,230
44	Gazole	SC	Maldah	Maldaha Uttar	255,085
45	Chanchal		Maldah	Maldaha Uttar	244,428
46	Harishchandrapur		Maldah	Maldaha Uttar	238,850
47	Malatipur		Maldah	Maldaha Uttar	212,691
48	Ratua		Maldah	Maldaha Uttar	246,547
49	Manikchak		Maldah	Maldaha Dakshin	235,765
50	Maldaha	SC	Maldah	Maldaha Uttar	231,348
51	English Bazar		Maldah	Maldaha Dakshin	249,137
52	Mothabari		Maldah	Maldaha Dakshin	169,347
53	Sujapur		Maldah	Maldaha Dakshin	236,443
54	Baisnabnagar		Maldah	Maldaha Dakshin	233,865
55	Farakka		Murshidabad	Maldaha Dakshin	181,659
56	Samserganj		Murshidabad	Maldaha Dakshin	161,435
57	Suti		Murshidabad	Jangipur	229,208
58	Jangipur		Murshidabad	Jangipur	220,859
59	Raghunathganj		Murshidabad	Jangipur	200,452
60	Sagardighi		Murshidabad	Jangipur	216,977
61	Lalgola		Murshidabad	Jangipur	186,182
62	Bhagabangola		Murshidabad	Murshidabad	224,618
63	Raninagar		Murshidabad	Murshidabad	244,391
64	Murshidabad		Murshidabad	Murshidabad	248,269
65	Nabagram	SC	Murshidabad	Jangipur	243,025
66	Khargram	SC	Murshidabad	Jangipur	230,464
67	Burwan	SC	Murshidabad	Beharampore	214,003
68	Kandi		Murshidabad	Beharampore	233,024
69	Bharatpur		Murshidabad	Beharampore	239,184
70	Rejinagar		Murshidabad	Beharampore	256,267
71	Beldanga		Murshidabad	Beharampore	243,984
72	Baharampur		Murshidabad	Beharampore	240,830
73	Hariharpara		Murshidabad	Murshidabad	245,484
74	Naoda		Murshidabad	Berhampore	235,737
75	Domkal		Murshidabad	Murshidabad	267,374
76	Jalangi		Murshidabad	Murshidabad	262,787
77	Karimpur		Nadia	Murshidabad	252,844
78	Tehatta		Nadia	Krishnanagar	252,431
79	Palashipara		Nadia	Krishnanagar	231,620
80	Kaliganj		Nadia	Krishnanagar	232,460
81	Nakashipara		Nadia	Krishnanagar	218,669
82	Chapra		Nadia	Krishnanagar	232,057
83	Krishnanagar Uttar		Nadia	Krishnanagar	216,456
84	Nabadwip		Nadia	Ranaghat	230,011
85	Krishnanagar Dakshin		Nadia	Krishnanagar	209,781
86	Santipur		Nadia	Ranaghat	227,477
87	Ranaghat Uttar Paschim		Nadia	Ranaghat	232,716
88	Krishnaganj	SC	Nadia	Ranaghat	253,036
89	Ranaghat Uttar Purba	SC	Nadia	Ranaghat	232,399
90	Ranaghat Dakshin	SC	Nadia	Ranaghat	253,346
91	Chakdaha		Nadia	Ranaghat	223,981
92	Kalyani	SC	Nadia	Bangaon	230,489
93	Haringhata	SC	Nadia	Bangaon	225,109
94	Bagda	SC	North 24 Parganas	Bangaon	240,989
95	Bangaon Uttar	SC	North 24 Parganas	Bangaon	225,962
96	Bangaon Dakshin	SC	North 24 Parganas	Bangaon	228,359
97	Gaighata	SC	North 24 Parganas	Bangaon	222,723
98	Swarupnagar	SC	North 24 Parganas	Bangaon	228,965
99	Baduria		North 24 Parganas	Basirhat	236,162
100	Habra		North 24 Parganas	Barasat	208,822
101	Ashoknagar		North 24 Parganas	Barasat	229,506
102	Amdanga		North 24 Parganas	Barrackpore	221,207
103	Bijpur		North 24 Parganas	Barrackpore	158,096
104	Naihati		North 24 Parganas	Barrackpore	170,581
105	Bhatpara		North 24 Parganas	Barrackpore	117,195
106	Jagatdal		North 24 Parganas	Barrackpore	195,630
107	Noapara		North 24 Parganas	Barrackpore	213,727
108	Barrackpur		North 24 Parganas	Barrackpore	170,646
109	Khardaha		North 24 Parganas	Dum Dum	209,855
110	Dum Dum Uttar		North 24 Parganas	Dum Dum	240,341
111	Panihati		North 24 Parganas	Dum Dum	189,714
112	Kamarhati		North 24 Parganas	Dum Dum	162,646
113	Baranagar		North 24 Parganas	Dum Dum	186,541
114	Dum Dum		North 24 Parganas	Dum Dum	217,541
115	Rajarhat New Town		North 24 Parganas	Barasat	267,645
116	Bidhannagar		North 24 Parganas	Barasat	203,877
117	Rajarhat Gopalpur		North 24 Parganas	Dum Dum	218,890
118	Madhyamgram		North 24 Parganas	Barasat	244,485
119	Barasat		North 24 Parganas	Barasat	252,439
120	Deganga		North 24 Parganas	Barasat	240,007
121	Haroa		North 24 Parganas	Basirhat	243,400
122	Minakhan	SC	North 24 Parganas	Basirhat	222,011
123	Sandeshkhali	ST	North 24 Parganas	Basirhat	223,269
124	Basirhat Dakshin		North 24 Parganas	Basirhat	260,361
125	Basirhat Uttar		North 24 Parganas	Basirhat	245,388
126	Hingalganj	SC	North 24 Parganas	Basirhat	215,122
127	Gosaba	SC	South 24 Parganas	Jaynagar	221,332
128	Basanti	SC	South 24 Parganas	Jaynagar	240,303
129	Kultali	SC	South 24 Parganas	Jaynagar	261,736
130	Patharpratima		South 24 Parganas	Mathurapur	257,704
131	Kakdwip		South 24 Parganas	Mathurapur	241,720
132	Sagar		South 24 Parganas	Mathurapur	274,103
133	Kulpi		South 24 Parganas	Mathurapur	216,620
134	Raidighi		South 24 Parganas	Mathurapur	267,846
135	Mandirbazar	SC	South 24 Parganas	Mathurapur	222,090
136	Jaynagar	SC	South 24 Parganas	Jaynagar	227,238
137	Baruipur Purba	SC	South 24 Parganas	Jadavpur	245,106
138	Canning Paschim	SC	South 24 Parganas	Jaynagar	238,236
139	Canning Purba		South 24 Parganas	Jaynagar	246,673
140	Baruipur Paschim		South 24 Parganas	Jadavpur	233,097
141	Magrahat Purba	SC	South 24 Parganas	Jaynagar	232,589
142	Magrahat Paschim		South 24 Parganas	Mathurapur	217,022
143	Diamond Harbour		South 24 Parganas	Diamond Harbour	245,097
144	Falta		South 24 Parganas	Diamond Harbour	236,444
145	Satgachhia		South 24 Parganas	Diamond Harbour	256,251
146	Bishnupur, South 24 Parganas	SC	South 24 Parganas	Diamond Harbour	268,266
147	Sonarpur Dakshin		South 24 Parganas	Jadavpur	260,993
148	Bhangar		South 24 Parganas	Jadavpur	272,711
149	Kasba		South 24 Parganas	Kolkata Dakshin	265,616
150	Jadavpur		South 24 Parganas	Jadavpur	260,821
151	Sonarpur Uttar		South 24 Parganas	Jadavpur	273,219
152	Tollyganj		South 24 Parganas	Jadavpur	229,994
153	Behala Purba		South 24 Parganas	Kolkata Dakshin	259,752
154	Behala Paschim		South 24 Parganas	Kolkata Dakshin	266,173
155	Maheshtala		South 24 Parganas	Diamond Harbour	243,365
156	Budge Budge		South 24 Parganas	Diamond Harbour	229,907
157	Metiaburuz		South 24 Parganas	Diamond Harbour	189,494
158	Kolkata Port		Kolkata	Kolkata Dakshin	171,615
159	Bhabanipur		Kolkata	Kolkata Dakshin	160,313
160	Rashbehari		Kolkata	Kolkata Dakshin	158,406
161	Ballygunge		Kolkata	Kolkata Dakshin	188,839
162	Chowranghee		Kolkata	Kolkata Uttar	126,349
163	Entally		Kolkata	Kolkata Uttar	178,877
164	Beleghata		Kolkata	Kolkata Uttar	190,599
165	Jorasanko		Kolkata	Kolkata Uttar	122,686
166	Shyampukur		Kolkata	Kolkata Uttar	131,819
167	Maniktola		Kolkata	Kolkata Uttar	165,906
168	Kashipur Belgachhia		Kolkata	Kolkata Uttar	167,936
169	Bally		Howrah	Howrah	133,573
170	Howrah Uttar		Howrah	Howrah	149,948
171	Howrah Madhya		Howrah	Howrah	214,821
172	Shibpur		Howrah	Howrah	194,963
173	Howrah Dakshin		Howrah	Howrah	240,607
174	Sankrail	SC	Howrah	Howrah	240,252
175	Panchla		Howrah	Howrah	248,497
176	Uluberia Purba		Howrah	Uluberia	218,481
177	Uluberia Uttar	SC	Howrah	Uluberia	214,671
178	Uluberia Dakshin		Howrah	Uluberia	237,057
179	Shyampur		Howrah	Uluberia	259,278
180	Bagnan		Howrah	Uluberia	230,578
181	Amta		Howrah	Uluberia	256,982
182	Udaynarayanpur		Howrah	Uluberia	229,091
183	Jagatballavpur		Howrah	Srerampur	270,806
184	Domjur		Howrah	Srerampur	269,236
185	Uttarpara		Hooghly	Srerampur	228,272
186	Sreerampur		Hooghly	Srerampur	205,662
187	Champdani		Hooghly	Srerampur	221,952
188	Singur		Hooghly	Hooghly	237,388
189	Chandannagar		Hooghly	Hooghly	203,451
190	Chunchura		Hooghly	Hooghly	275,715
191	Balagarh	SC	Hooghly	Hooghly	240,088
192	Pandua		Hooghly	Hooghly	249,081
193	Saptagram		Hooghly	Hooghly	210,370
194	Chanditala		Hooghly	Srerampur	246,543
195	Jangipara		Hooghly	Srerampur	251,069
196	Haripal		Hooghly	Arambagh	264,175
197	Dhanekhali	SC	Hooghly	Hooghly	262,689
198	Tarakeswar		Hooghly	Arambagh	235,441
199	Pursurah		Hooghly	Arambagh	259,590
200	Arambag	SC	Hooghly	Arambagh	253,260
201	Goghat	SC	Hooghly	Arambagh	248,076
202	Khanakul		Hooghly	Arambagh	268,570
203	Tamluk		Purba Medinipur	Tamluk	274,508
204	Panskura Purba		Purba Medinipur	Tamluk	238,519
205	Panskura Paschim		Purba Medinipur	Ghatal	278,744
206	Moyna		Purba Medinipur	Tamluk	264,971
207	Nandakumar		Purba Medinipur	Tamluk	264,437
208	Mahisadal		Purba Medinipur	Tamluk	253,523
209	Haldia	SC	Purba Medinipur	Tamluk	251,919
210	Nandigram		Purba Medinipur	Tamluk	266,415
211	Chandipur		Purba Medinipur	Kanthi	255,924
212	Patashpur		Purba Medinipur	Kanthi	247,037
213	Kanthi Uttar		Purba Medinipur	Kanthi	263,602
214	Bhagabanpur		Purba Medinipur	Kanthi	263,775
215	Khejuri	SC	Purba Medinipur	Kanthi	247,976
216	Kanthi Dakshin		Purba Medinipur	Kanthi	227,954
217	Ramnagar, Purba Medinipur		Purba Medinipur	Kanthi	269,252
218	Egra		Purba Medinipur	Medinipur	291,598
219	Dantan		Paschim Medinipur	Medinipur	236,168
220	Nayagram	ST	Jhargram	Jhargram	226,894
221	Gopiballavpur		Jhargram	Jhargram	227,793
222	Jhargram		Jhargram	Jhargram	235,147
223	Keshiary	ST	Paschim Medinipur	Medinipur	238,769
224	Kharagpur Sadar		Paschim Medinipur	Medinipur	180,530
225	Narayangarh		Paschim Medinipur	Medinipur	239,064
226	Sabang		Paschim Medinipur	Ghatal	274,383
227	Pingla		Paschim Medinipur	Ghatal	255,892
228	Kharagpur		Paschim Medinipur	Medinipur	218,142
229	Debra		Paschim Medinipur	Ghatal	231,898
230	Daspur		Paschim Medinipur	Ghatal	296,045
231	Ghatal	SC	Paschim Medinipur	Ghatal	276,569
232	Chandrakona	SC	Paschim Medinipur	Arambagh	282,820
233	Garbeta		Paschim Medinipur	Jhargram	232,881
234	Salboni		Paschim Medinipur	Jhargram	279,304
235	Keshpur	SC	Paschim Medinipur	Ghatal	268,034
236	Medinipur		Paschim Medinipur	Medinipur	260,295
237	Binpur	ST	Jhargram	Jhargram	221,125
238	Bandwan	ST	Purulia	Jhargram	285,966
239	Balarampur, Purulia		Purulia	Purulia	235,388
240	Baghmundi		Purulia	Purulia	250,657
241	Joypur, Purulia		Purulia	Purulia	253,825
242	Purulia		Purulia	Purulia	251,816
243	Manbazar	ST	Purulia	Purulia	255,460
244	Kashipur		Purulia	Purulia	229,552
245	Para	SC	Purulia	Purulia	236,120
246	Raghunathpur, Purulia	SC	Purulia	Bankura	254,023
247	Saltora	SC	Bankura	Bankura	233,175
248	Chhatna		Bankura	Bankura	242,151
249	Ranibandh	ST	Bankura	Bankura	254,570
250	Raipur, Bankura	ST	Bankura	Bankura	224,120
251	Taldangra		Bankura	Bankura	235,685
252	Bankura		Bankura	Bankura	260,886
253	Barjora		Bankura	Bishnupur	251,402
254	Onda		Bankura	Bishnupur	262,408
255	Bishnupur, Bankura		Bankura	Bishnupur	220,284
256	Katulpur	SC	Bankura	Bishnupur	253,697
257	Indas	SC	Bankura	Bishnupur	245,267
258	Sonamukhi	SC	Bankura	Bishnupur	235,770
259	Khandaghosh	SC	Purba Bardhaman	Bishnupur	233,679
260	Burdwan Dakshin		Purba Bardhaman	Bardhaman–Durgapur	221,961
261	Raina	SC	Purba Bardhaman	Bardhaman Purba	246,060
262	Jamalpur	SC	Purba Bardhaman	Bardhaman Purba	225,468
263	Manteswar		Purba Bardhaman	Bardhaman–Durgapur	216,764
264	Kalna	SC	Purba Bardhaman	Bardhaman Purba	226,370
265	Memari		Purba Bardhaman	Bardhaman Purba	239,601
266	Burdwan Uttar	SC	Purba Bardhaman	Bardhaman–Durgapur	260,360
267	Bhatar		Purba Bardhaman	Bardhaman–Durgapur	226,642
268	Purbasthali Dakshin		Purba Bardhaman	Bardhaman Purba	232,577
269	Purbasthali Uttar		Purba Bardhaman	Bardhaman Purba	239,480
270	Katwa		Purba Bardhaman	Bardhaman Purba	256,811
271	Ketugram		Purba Bardhaman	Bolpur	234,035
272	Mangalkot		Purba Bardhaman	Bolpur	231,984
273	Ausgram	SC	Purba Bardhaman	Bolpur	236,010
274	Galsi	SC	Purba Bardhaman	Bardhaman–Durgapur	243,955
275	Pandaveswar		Paschim Bardhaman	Asansol	188,390
276	Durgapur Purba		Paschim Bardhaman	Bardhaman–Durgapur	237,127
277	Durgapur Paschim		Paschim Bardhaman	Bardhaman–Durgapur	238,700
278	Raniganj		Paschim Bardhaman	Asansol	215,994
279	Jamuria		Paschim Bardhaman	Asansol	196,545
280	Asansol Dakshin		Paschim Bardhaman	Asansol	239,030
281	Asansol Uttar		Paschim Bardhaman	Asansol	236,858
282	Kulti		Paschim Bardhaman	Asansol	210,553
283	Barabani		Paschim Bardhaman	Asansol	201,898
284	Dubrajpur	SC	Birbhum	Birbhum	231,503
285	Suri		Birbhum	Birbhum	252,071
286	Bolpur		Birbhum	Bolpur	260,112
287	Nanoor	SC	Birbhum	Bolpur	269,082
288	Labhpur		Birbhum	Bolpur	234,630
289	Sainthia	SC	Birbhum	Birbhum	251,997
290	Mayureswar		Birbhum	Bolpur	225,874
291	Rampurhat		Birbhum	Birbhum	245,159
292	Hansan		Birbhum	Birbhum	237,273
293	Nalhati		Birbhum	Birbhum	231,681
294	Murarai		Birbhum	Birbhum	252,004
