= Italgacha =

- Neighbourhood
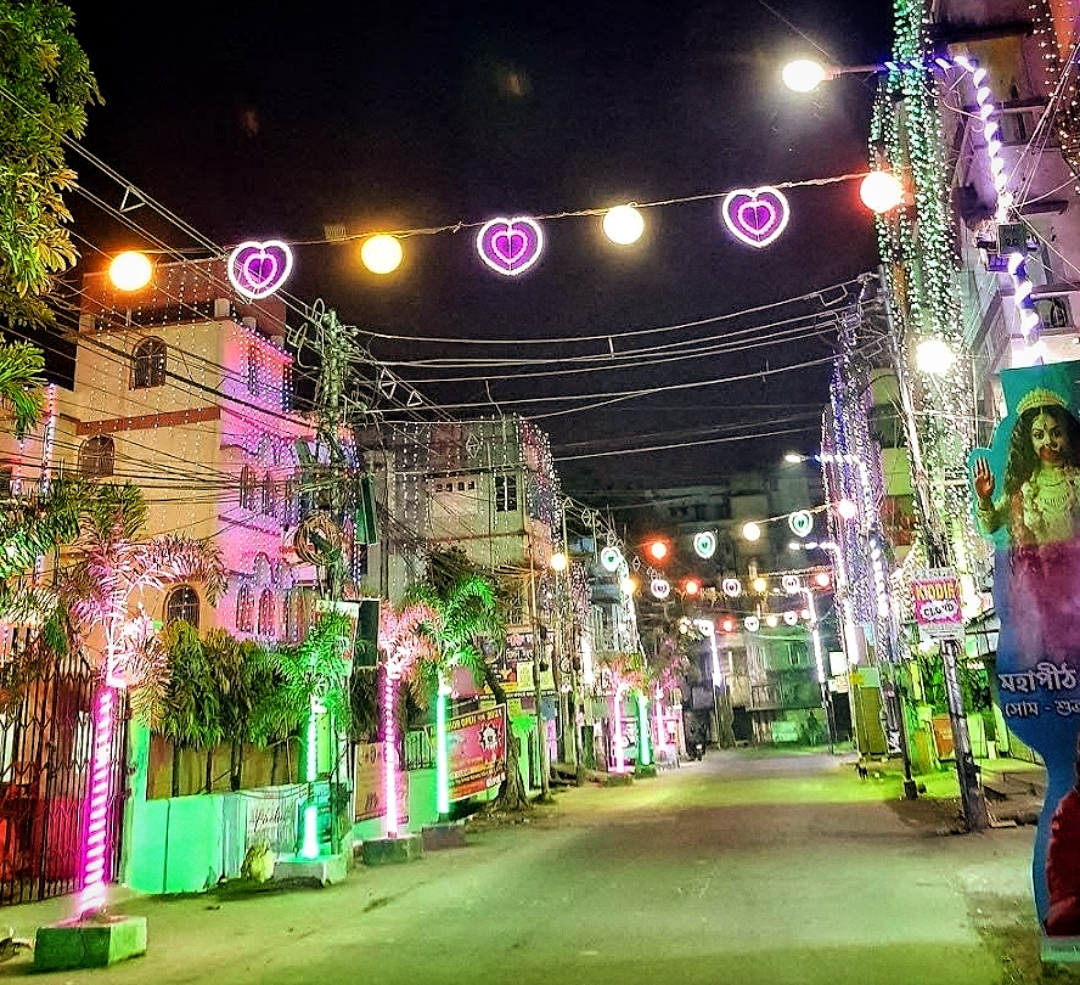
- Italgacha Road

- Location in Kolkata Italgacha (West Bengal) Italgacha (India)
- Coordinates: 22.6473°N 88.4284°E
- Country: India
- State: West Bengal
- Division: Presidency
- District: North 24 Parganas
- Metro Station: Jai Hind; Jessore Road; Dum Dum Cantonment
- Railway Station: Dum Dum Cantonment

Government
  - Type: Municipality
  - Body: Dum Dum Municipality

Languages
  - Official: Bengali, English
- Time zone: UTC+5:30 (IST)
- PIN: 700079
- Telephone code: +91 33
- Vehicle registration: WB
- Lok Sabha constituency: Dum Dum
- Vidhan Sabha constituency: Dum Dum

Italgacha is a locality in Dum Dum of North 24 Parganas district in the Indian state of West Bengal. It is a part of the area covered by Kolkata Metropolitan Development Authority (KMDA). Adjoined localities are Nalta, Manikpur and Motilal Colony.

== Geography ==
=== Post office ===
Italgacha has a delivery sub post office, with PIN 700079 in the Kolkata North Division of Kolkata district in Calcutta region.

=== Police station ===
Dum Dum police station under Barrackpore Police Commissionerate has jurisdiction over Italgacha areas.

== Markets ==
Markets in or near Italgacha area are:

- Kumarpara Market
- 1 no. Airport Market
