= Arabinda Sarani =

- Neighbourhood
- Aurobindo Sarani
- Location in Kolkata Arabinda Sarani (West Bengal) Arabinda Sarani (India)
- Coordinates: 22.6418°N 88.4247°E
- Country: India
- State: West Bengal
- Division: Presidency
- District: North 24 Parganas
- Metro Station: Jessore Road; Dum Dum Cantonment
- Railway Station: Dum Dum Cantonment

Government
  - Type: Municipality
  - Body: Dum Dum Municipality

Languages
  - Official: Bengali, English
- Time zone: UTC+5:30 (IST)
- PIN: 700028
- Telephone code: +91 33
- Vehicle registration: WB
- Lok Sabha constituency: Dum Dum
- Vidhan Sabha constituency: Dum Dum

Arabinda Sarani or Aurobindo Sarani is a locality in Dum Dum of North 24 Parganas district in the Indian state of West Bengal. Localities within Aurobindo Sarani are Kalidham and West Kamalapur. It is a part of the area covered by Kolkata Metropolitan Development Authority (KMDA).

== Geography ==
=== Post Office ===
Dum Dum has a delivery Head post office, with PIN 700028 in the Kolkata North Division of Kolkata district in Calcutta region. Other post offices with the same PIN are Kumarpara, Ordnance Factory, Kamalapur and Rajabagan.

=== Police station ===
Dum Dum police station under Barrackpore Police Commissionerate has jurisdiction over Aurobindo Sarani areas.

== Markets ==
Markets near Arabinda Sarani area are:

- Near the former His Master's Voice/Saregama factory
- Kumarpara Market
- Kalidham Bazar
