= Motilal Colony =

- Neighbourhood
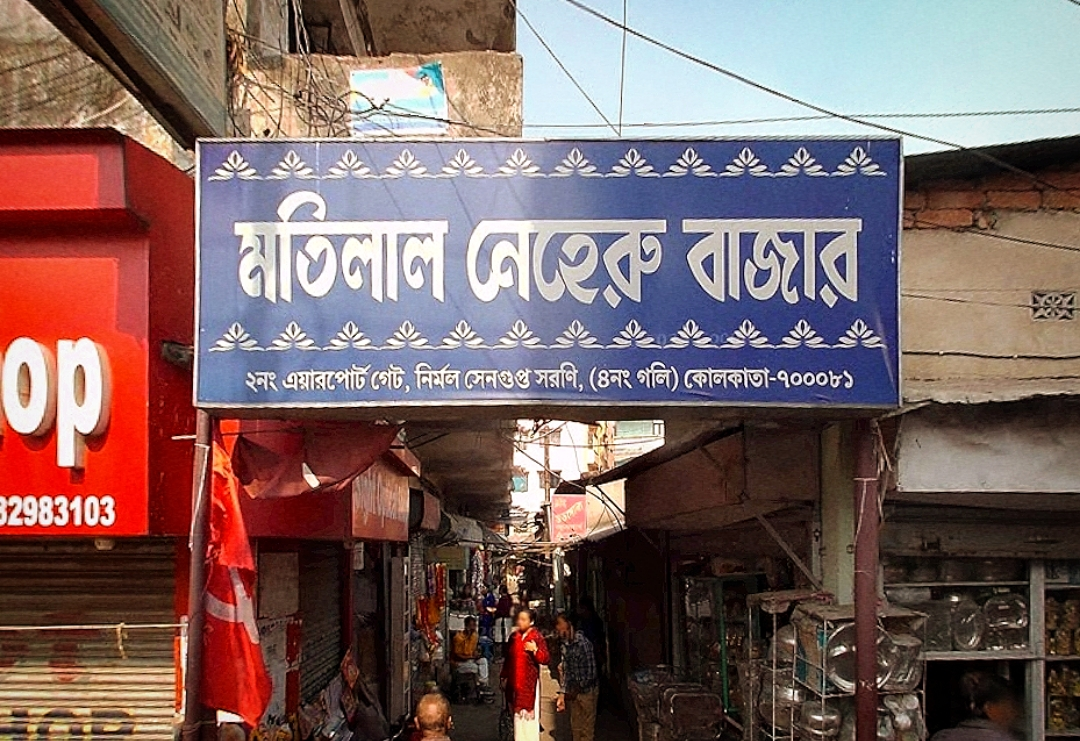
- A local market

- Location in Kolkata Motilal Colony (West Bengal) Motilal Colony (India)
- Coordinates: 22.6454°N 88.4302°E
- Country: India
- State: West Bengal
- Division: Presidency
- District: North 24 Parganas
- Metro Station: Jai Hind; Jessore Road

Government
  - Type: Municipality
  - Body: Dum Dum Municipality

Languages
  - Official: Bengali, English
- Time zone: UTC+5:30 (IST)
- PIN: 700081
- Telephone code: +91 33
- Vehicle registration: WB
- Lok Sabha constituency: Dum Dum
- Vidhan Sabha constituency: Dum Dum

Motilal Colony is a locality in Dum Dum of the North 24 Parganas district in the Indian state of West Bengal. It is a part of the area covered by Kolkata Metropolitan Development Authority (KMDA).
