= Dum Dum =

Municipal Town in West Bengal

- City
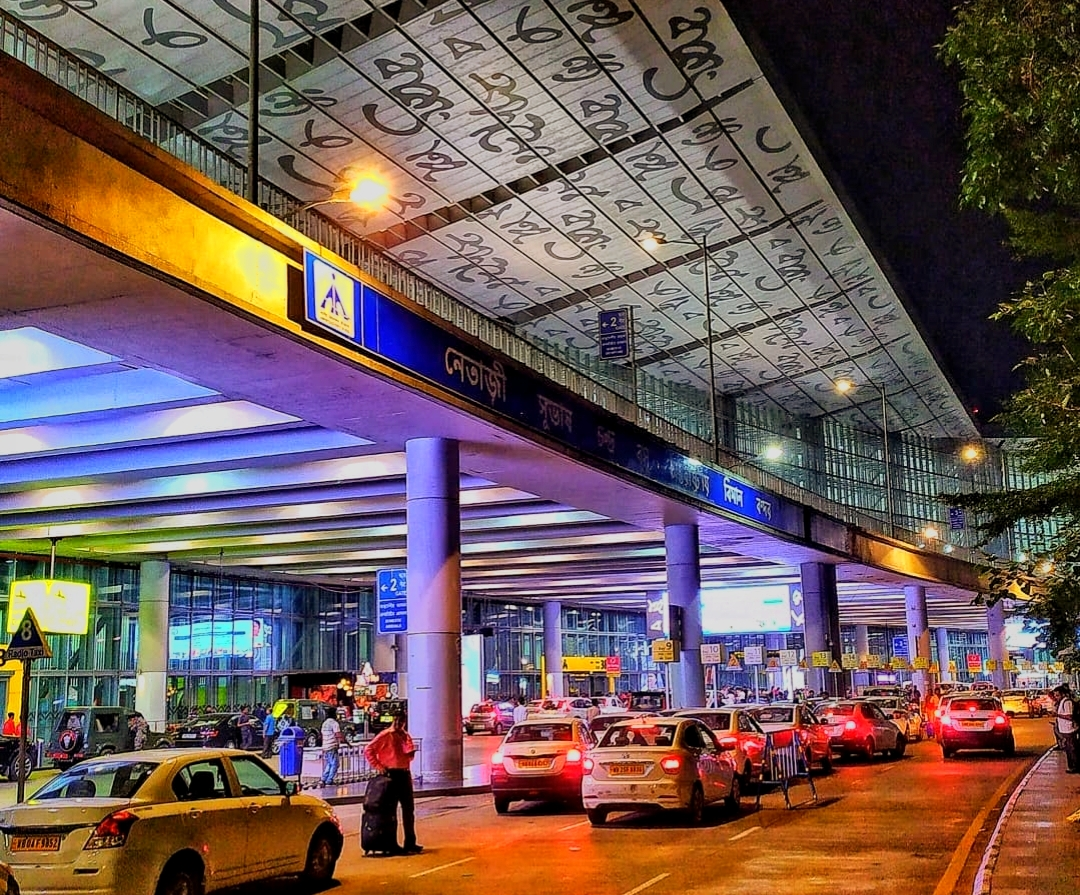
- Netaji Subhash Chandra Bose International Airport

- Location in Kolkata Dum Dum (West Bengal) Dum Dum (India)
- Coordinates: 22.6352°N 88.4143°E
- Country: India
- State: West Bengal
- Division: Presidency
- District: North 24 Parganas
- Metro Station: Dum Dum; Dum Dum Cantonment; Jessore Road; Jai Hind
- Railway Station: Dum Dum Cantonment; Dum Dum Junction
- Established: 1783; 243 years ago (as Dum Dum Cantonment Board) 1929; 97 years ago (as Dum Dum Municipality)

Government
  - Type: Municipality
  - Body: Dum Dum Municipality
  - Chairman: Harendra Singh
  - Vice-Chairman: Barun Natta
  - MLA: Arijit Bakshi (BJP)

Area
  - Total: 9.73 km^{2} (3.76 sq mi)
- Elevation: 11 m (36 ft)

Population (2011)
  - Total: 114,786
  - Density: 11,800/km^{2} (30,600/sq mi)

Languages
  - Official: Bengali
  - Additional official: Hindi, English
- Time zone: UTC+5:30 (IST)
- PIN: 700028, 700052, 700065, 700079, 700080, 700081
- Telephone code: +91 33
- Vehicle registration: WB
- Lok Sabha constituency: Dum Dum
- Vidhan Sabha constituency: Dum Dum
- Website: dumdummunicipality.co.in

Dum Dum is a city and a municipality in the Kolkata Metropolitan Area of North 24 Parganas district in the Indian state of West Bengal. It is a part of the area covered by Kolkata Metropolitan Development Authority (KMDA). The Netaji Subhas Chandra Bose International Airport locally known as Kolkata Airport, is situated at Dum Dum. Dum Dum area was divided into three parts governed by three separate municipalities named as South Dum Dum, Dum Dum and North Dum Dum.

== Etymology ==
During the 19th century the area was home to the Dum Dum Arsenal, a British Royal Artillery facility. It was here that, in the early 1890s, Captain Neville Bertie-Clay developed a bullet with the jacket cut away at the tip to reveal its soft lead core (see hollow-point bullet), known informally as a dum-dum or more correctly as an expanding bullet. The previous name of Dum Dum was "Domdoma".

Some resources claim that the Persian word damdama, which means "mound" or "elevated battery", is the source of the word Dum Dum.

== History ==
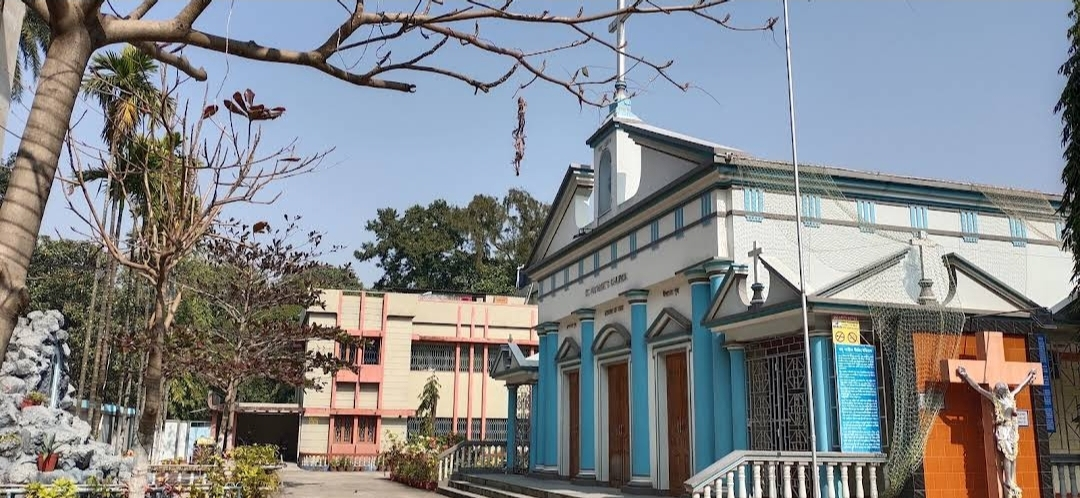
St. Patrick's Church, Dum Dum Cantonment

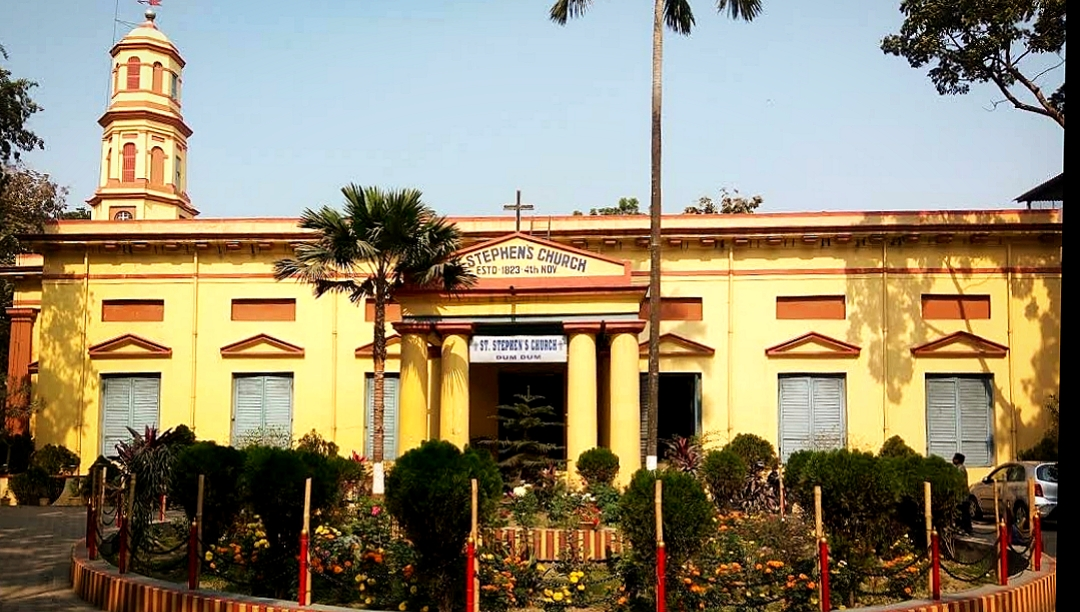
St. Stephen's Church, Dum Dum Cant.

In the history of Bengal, Dum Dum holds a very significant place. Dum Dum was sparsely populated before British arrival. The area was slightly elevated. On 6 February 1757, an accord was signed at Dum Dum by the Nawab of Bengal to allow the British to build forts at Calcutta, Dacca and Kashim Bazar. In 1783, a cantonment was established at Dum Dum. Military barracks were built and civilians started coming in to provide essential services to the military personnel. A Cantonment Board was formed to provide civic amenities. On 9 February 1822, the foundation stone was blessed and laid for Saint Patrick’s Chapel. On Good Friday in 1823, the chapel was dedicated and inaugurated with Irish priest M. Murphy as its chaplain. The ordnance factory was established at Dum Dum in 1846. The St. Stephens Church, a Roman Catholic Church Weslyan Chapel and a hospital for treatment of European were established in the central hub of Dum Dum Cantonment of old Dum Dum. It may be noted that both South Dum Dum Municipality and North Dum Dum Municipality were established in 1870 thereby somewhat defining administratively the different parts of an earlier undefined Dum Dum area. subsequently, Dum Dum was enlarged by the amalgamation of Kadihati municipality in 1883.

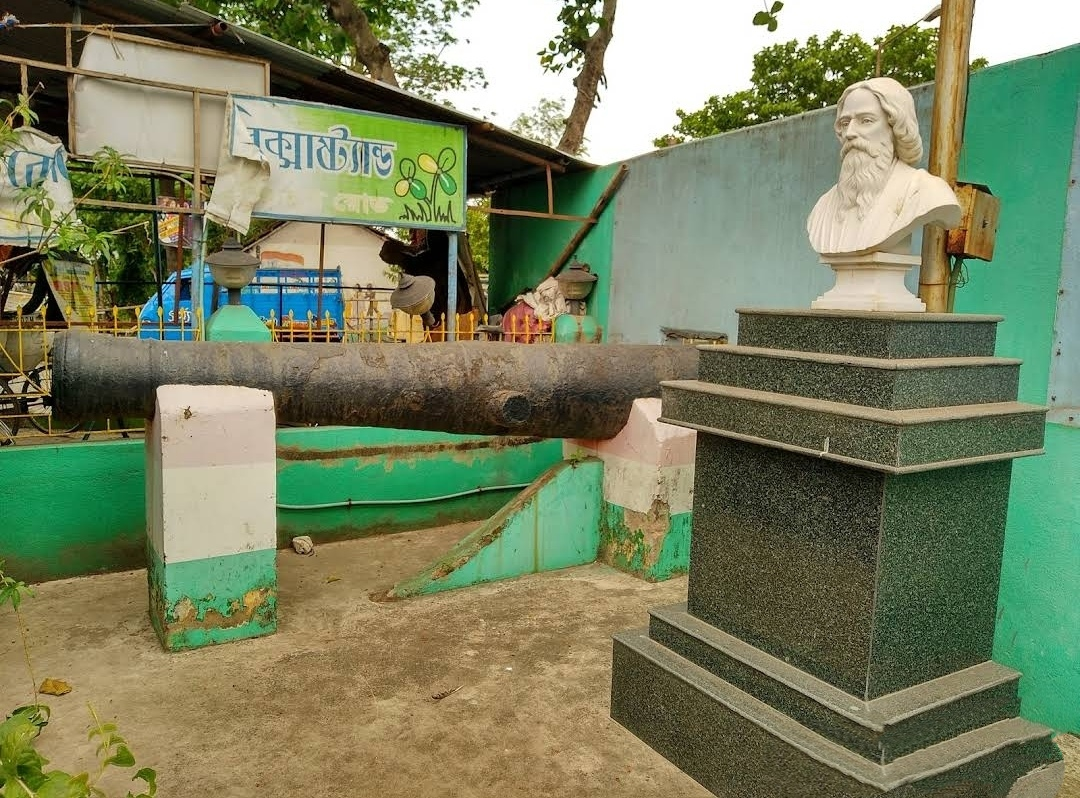
An old cannon at Dum Dum Cantonment

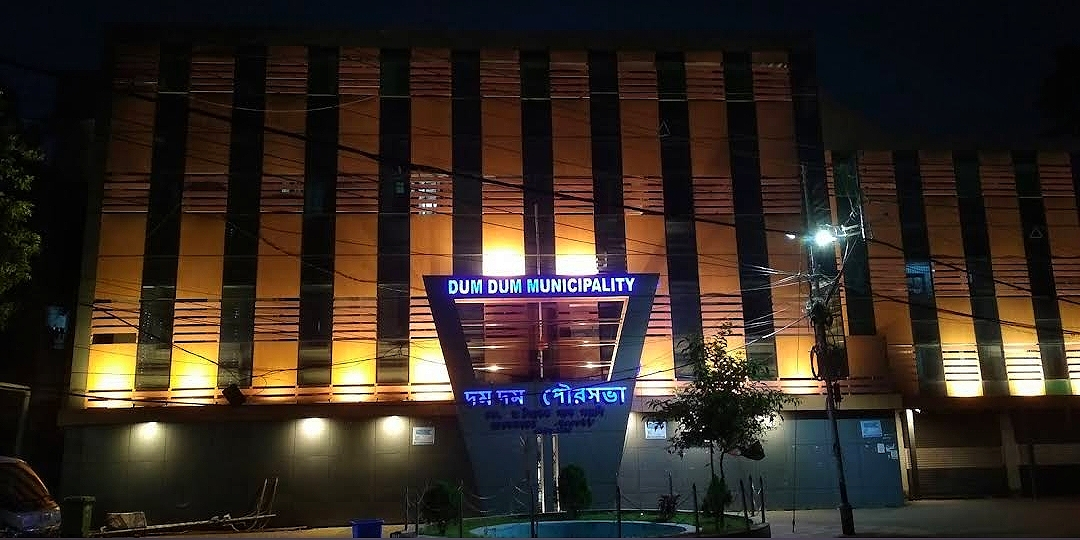
Dum Dum Municipality

Dum Dum was once a separate subdivision from 1861 to 1896. During the early years of the cantonment the British waged several imperial wars, out of which the wars in Burma, Nepal, the Deccan and Afganisthan were costly in blood and lives. Two monuments were erected to commemorate their memory. The Afghan War Memorial was built in Dum Dum in 1841 after the British lost the first Anglo-Afghan war. During the 1857 disturbances the Indian sepoys posted at Dum Dum were affected and Mangal Pandey was hanged from a tree at Dum Dum (his dead body was probably hanged at both Barrackpore and Dum Dum Cantonment). Dum Dum Cantonment was closed down and the Cantonment Board was replaced by Dum Dum Municipality in 1929. The temporary set back to Dum Dum arising from abolition of the cantonment and departure of British troops, was partially made up with the shifting of Jessop & Co. from Howrah to Dum Dum in 1928 and establishment of the Gramophone Company at Dum Dum in 1929. Bengal Flying Club, established in 1920, had a small fleet of single engine moth planes. The independence movement led to the sudden development of the Central Jail, where many top leaders and more numerous unknown patriots were lodged. The old military barracks made way for multi-storied jail barracks. The environment quite often reverberated with the chanting of Vande Mataram.

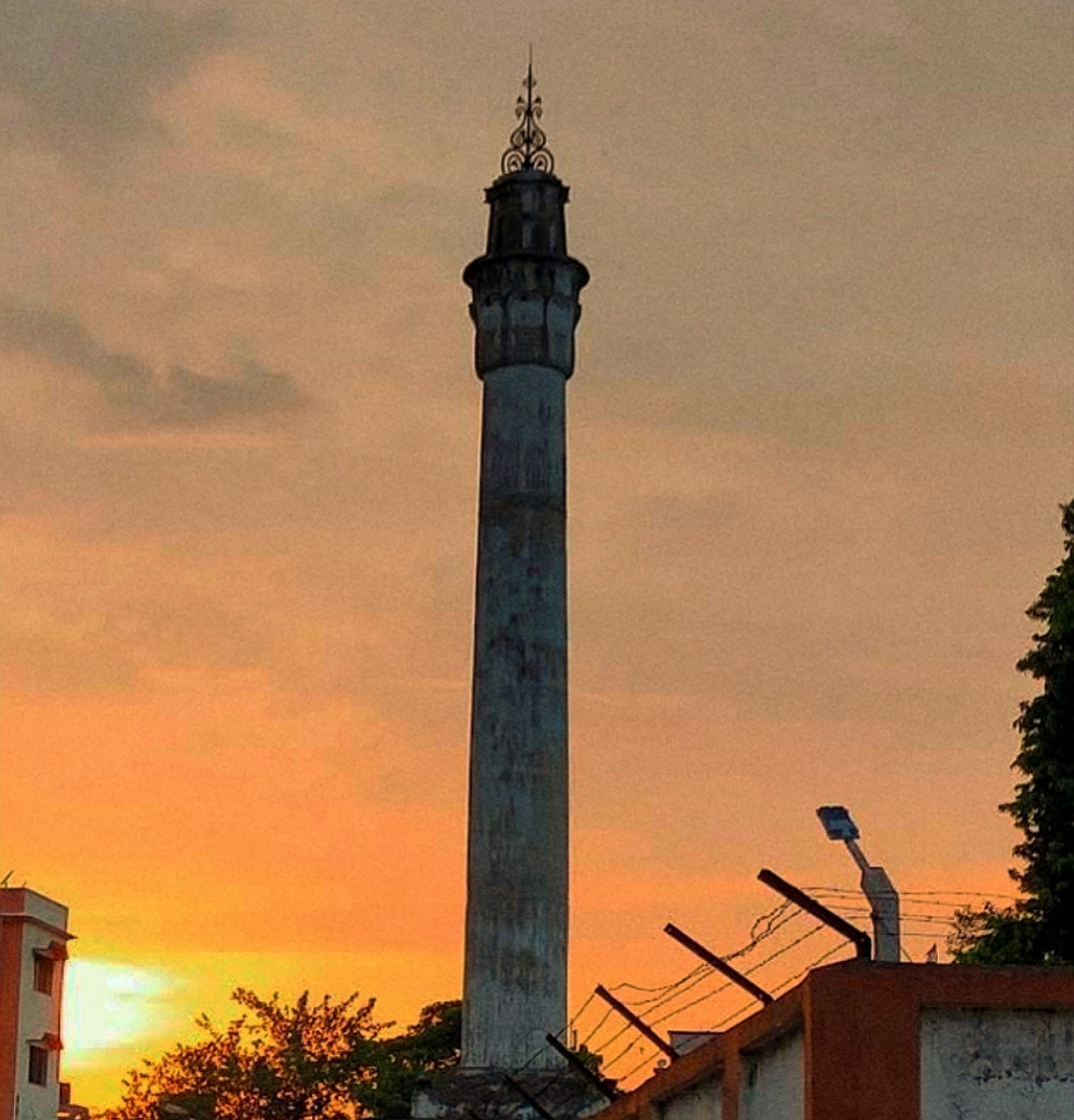
Afghan War Memorial, Ordnance Factory Dum Dum

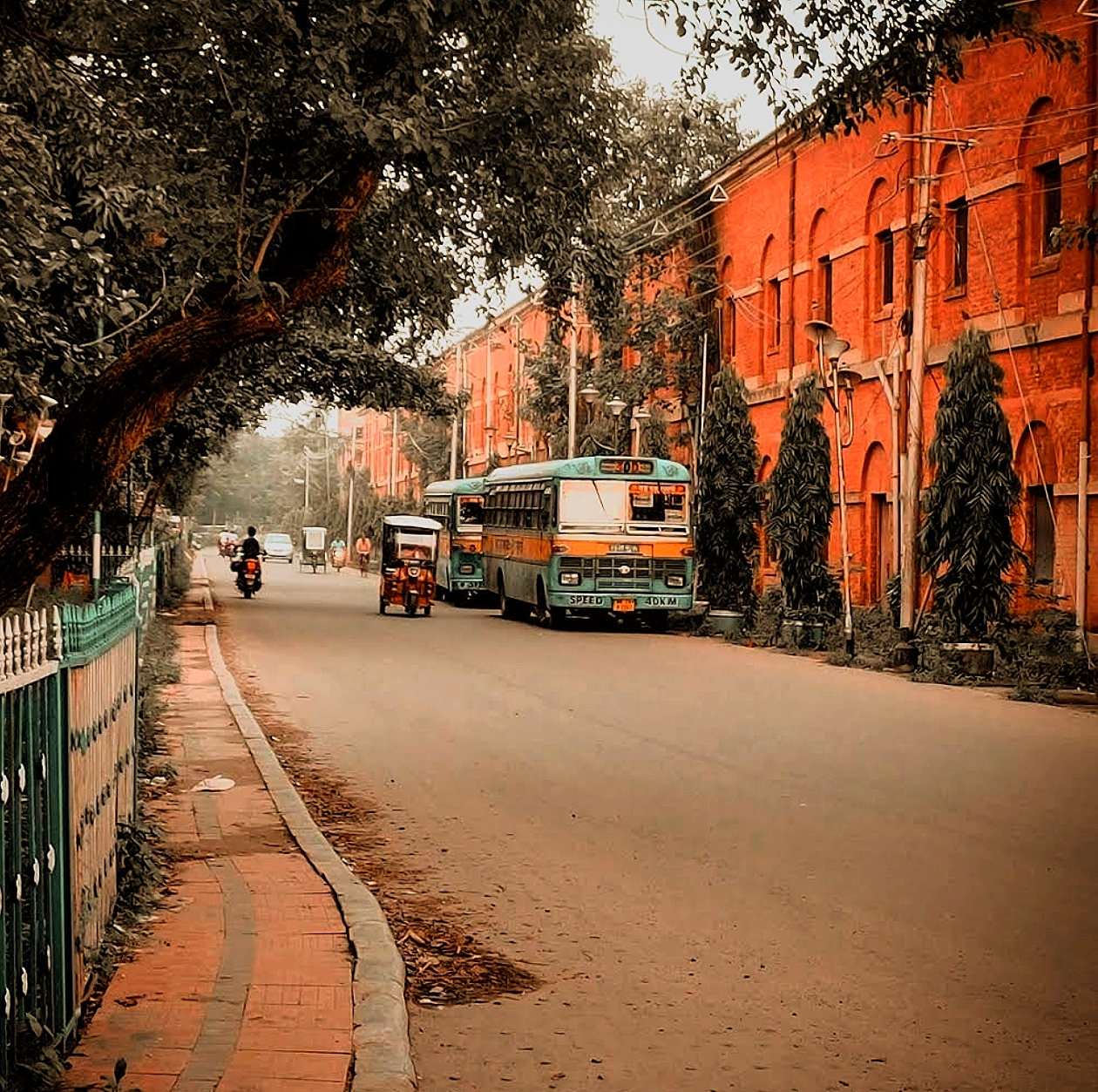
Central Jail Rd, Dum Dum Cantonment

With the partition of Bengal in 1947, "millions of refugees poured in from erstwhile East Pakistan." In the initial stages bulk of the refugees were non-agriculturists. A few of them made their own arrangements, but "it was squatters who made the East Bengali refugees famous or infamous". Squatting (Bengali: jabardakhal) ranged from the forcible occupation of barracks to the collective take-over of private, government and waste land. "This happened as early as 1948 with middle class refugees in the Jadavpur area: first on government land and then on private property, leading to violent clashes. Having won the battle, the elated squatters named their colony 'Bijaygarh', the Fort of Victory." By 1949, there were 40 such colonies in Jadavpur, Kasba, Santoshpur, Garia and Behala, in the south-eastern part of the city, and 65 in the Dum Dum and Panihati zone in the north. Subsequently squatters colonies also came up along the west bank of the Hooghly and by 1950, there were 150 such colonies. It has to be borne in mind that the squatters were in a way "self-settlers" in the absence of adequate official arrangements for rehabilitation. Within a very short time the refugees (quite often with government or administrative support) not only found a place to stay but developed a society with markets, schools, temples and sometimes even colleges, hospitals and recreational centres. Efforts have been made in more recent years to regularise land/property rights in the refugee colonies.

== Geography ==
Cities and towns in the southern portion of Barrackpore subdivision in North 24 Parganas district
M: municipal city/ town, CT: census town,
N: neighbourhood/ administrative location
Owing to space constraints in the small map, the actual locations in a larger map may vary slightly

=== Location ===
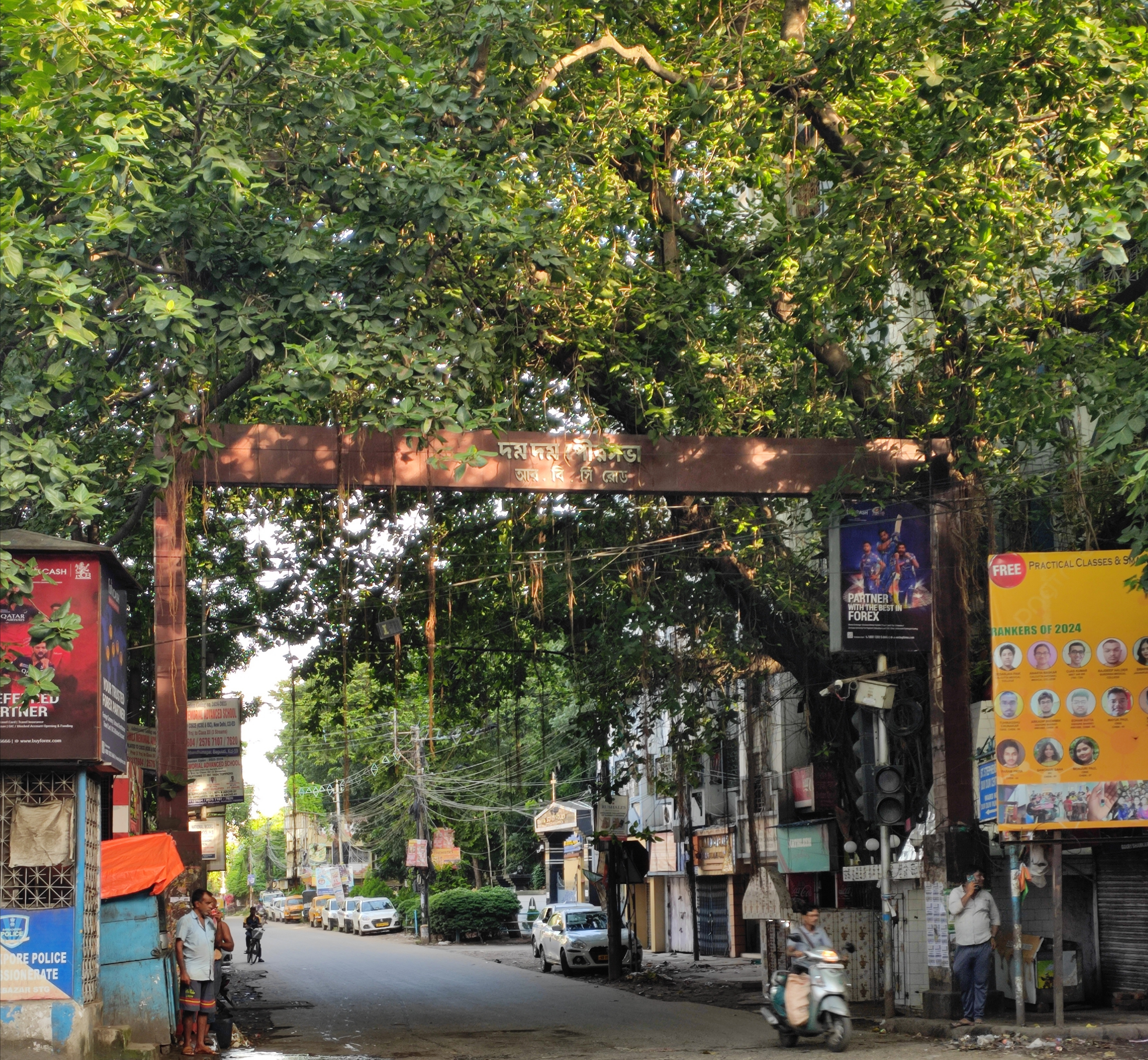
Entrance of Dum Dum Cantonment area (R.B.C Road)

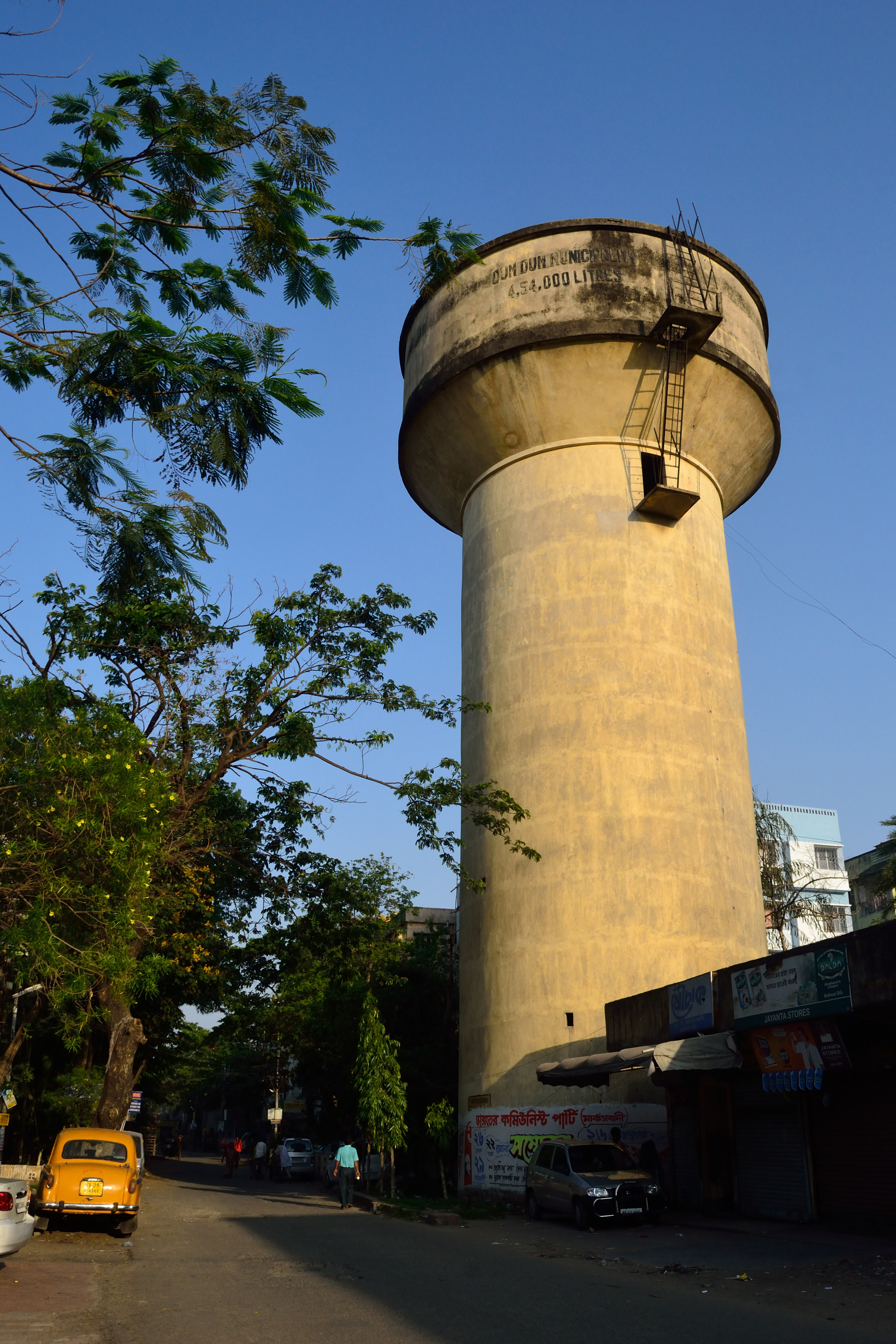
Mall Road, Dum Dum

Dum Dum is located at 22.62°N 88.42°E. It has an average elevation of 11 metres (36 feet).

Dum Dum is bounded by North Dum Dum (municipality) on the north and partly on the west, Bidhannagar Municipal Corporation areas on the east and South Dum Dum (municipality) on the south and partly on the west.

Dum Dum consists of localities such as Airport 1 No. Gate, Airport 2 No. Gate, Airport 2.5 No. Gate, Motilal Colony, Rajbari Colony, Gora Bazar, Mall Road, Kumarpara, Italgacha, Badra, Nalta, Manikpur, Kamalapur, Radha Nagar, Arabinda Sarani and Central Jail.

96% of the population of Barrackpore subdivision (partly presented in the map alongside, all places marked on the map are linked in the full screen map) lives in urban areas. In 2011, it had a density of population of 10,967 per km^{2} The subdivision has 16 municipalities and 24 census towns.

=== Police station ===
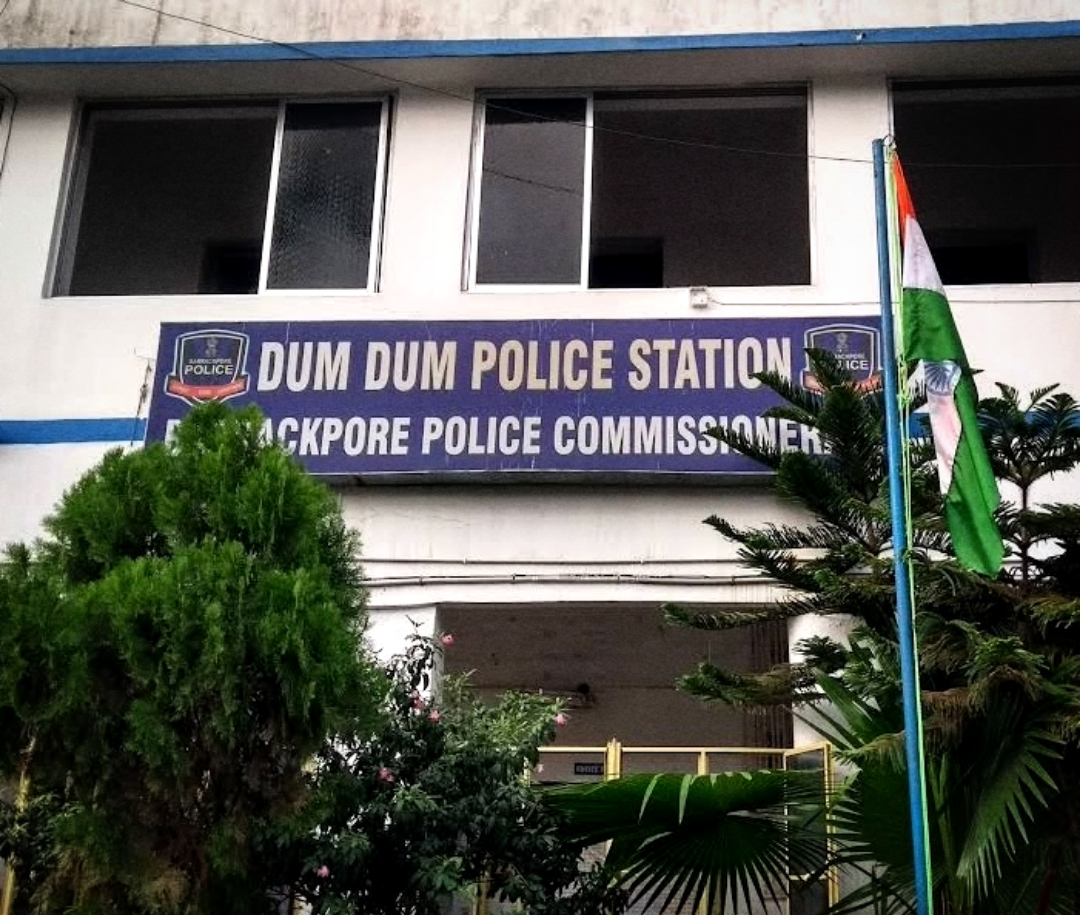
Dum Dum police station

Dum Dum police station under Barrackpore Police Commissionerate has jurisdiction over Dum Dum Municipal areas.

NSCBI Airport police station under the Bidhannagar Police Commissionerate has jurisdiction over the parts of Netaji Subhas Chandra Bose International Airport.

=== Post Offices ===
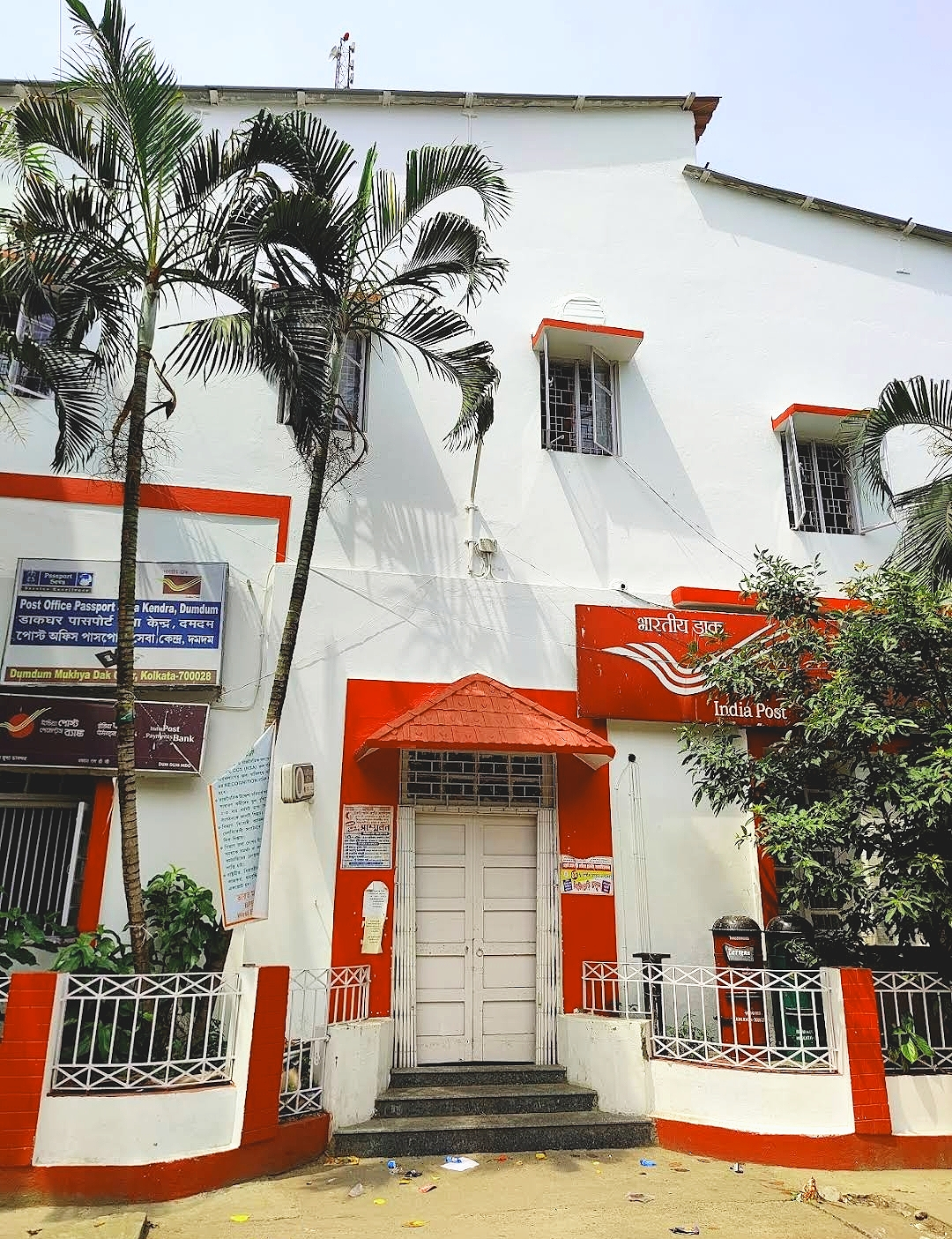
Dum Dum Head Post Office and Passport Seva Kendra

Dum Dum is a vast locality with many Postal Index Numbers:

Dum Dum has a delivery Head post office, with PIN 700028. Other post offices with the same PIN are Ordnance Factory, Kumarpara, Kamalapur and Rajabagan.

Kolkata Airport has a non-delivery sub post office, with PIN 700052.

Italgacha has a delivery sub post office, with PIN 700079.

Mall Road has a delivery sub post office, with PIN 700080. The only other post office with the same PIN is Jessore Road.

Rajbari Colony has a delivery sub post office, with PIN 700081.

== Demographics ==
Historical population
Year	Pop.	±%
1931	5,350	—
1941	7,622	+42.5%
1951	14,002	+83.7%
1961	20,041	+43.1%
1971	31,363	+56.5%
1981	33,604	+7.1%
1991	40,961	+21.9%
2001	101,296	+147.3%
2011	114,786	+13.3%
2021	149,000	+29.8%

=== Population ===
Per the 2011 Census of India, Dum Dum had a total population of 114,786, of which 58,566 (51%) were males and 56,220 (49%) were females. Population below 6 years was 8,259. The total number of literates was 97,997 (91.99% of the population over 6 years). As of 2001 India census, Dum Dum had a population of 102,319. Males constitute 52% of the population and females 48%. Dum Dum has an average literacy rate of 82%, higher than the national average of 59.5%: Male literacy is 85% and female literacy is 78%. In Dum Dum, 8% of the population is under 6 years of age.

=== Kolkata Urban Agglomeration ===
The following municipalities, census towns, and other locations in Barrackpore subdivision were part of Kolkata Urban Agglomeration in the 2011 census: Kanchrapara (M), Jetia (CT), Halisahar (M), Balibhara (CT), Naihati (M), Bhatpara (M), Kaugachhi (CT), Garshyamnagar (CT), Garulia (M), Ichhapur Defence Estate (CT), North Barrackpur (M), Barrackpur Cantonment (CB), Barrackpore (M), Jafarpur (CT), Ruiya (CT), Titagarh (M), Khardaha (M), Bandipur (CT), Panihati (M), Muragachha (CT) New Barrackpore (M), Chandpur (CT), Talbandha (CT), Patulia (CT), Kamarhati (M), Baranagar (M), South Dum Dum (M), North Dum Dum (M), Dum Dum (M), Noapara (CT), Babanpur (CT), Teghari (CT), Nanna (OG), Chakla (OG), Srotribati (OG), and Panpur (OG).

== Economy ==
=== Industry ===
The following industrial units are located in Dum Dum:

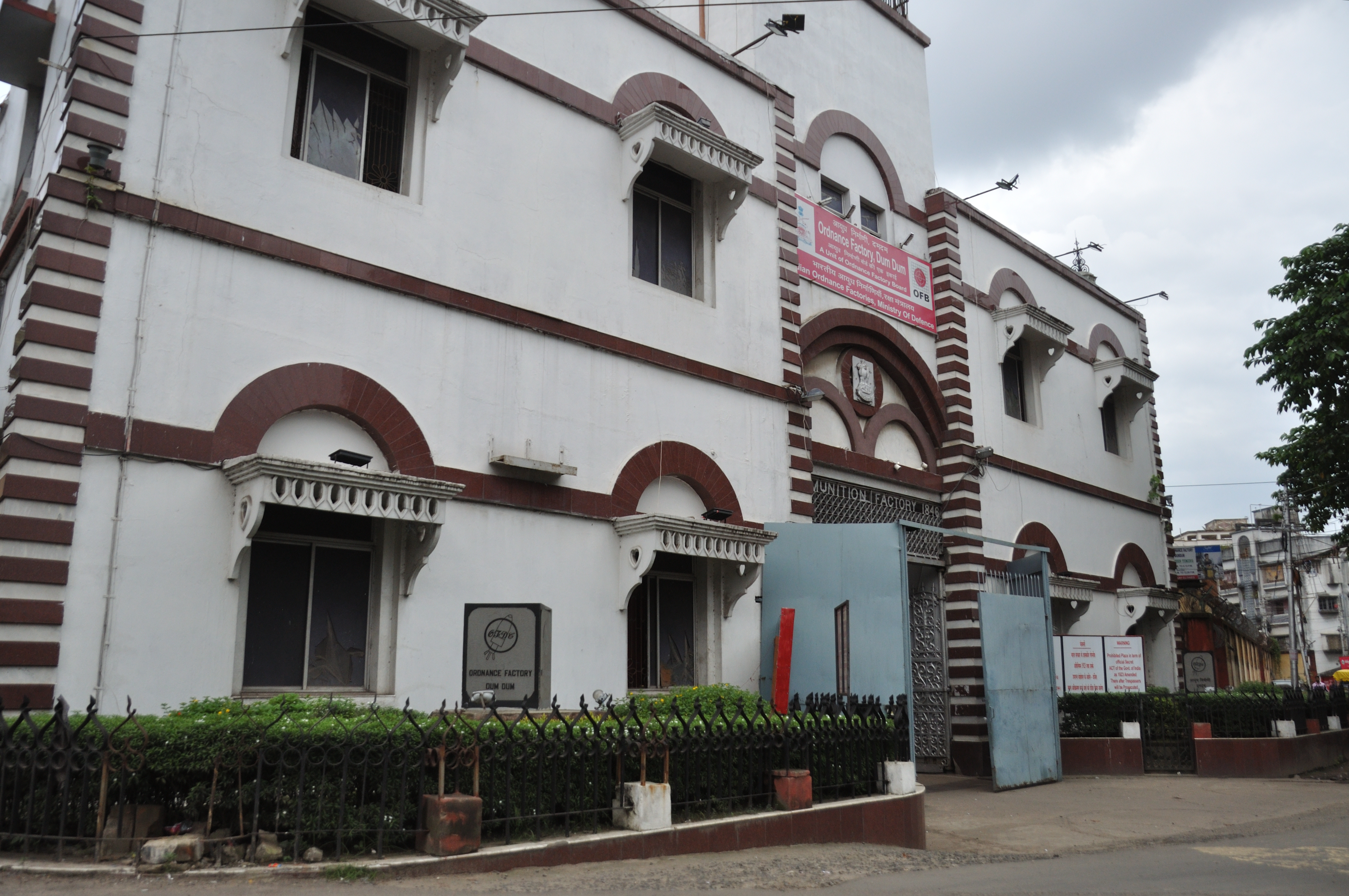
Ordnance Factory Dum Dum

- Ordnance Factory Dum Dum is a modern factory with unique high precision machining systems such as laser cutting, CNC-operated injection moulding and CNC machines for carrying out stringent quality products. The factory was initiated when Robert Clive recaptured Calcutta from Siraj ud-Daulah, the Nawab of Bengal, in 1757. It became the first development centre for defence stores in India established by the Royal forces. When the Gun & Shell Factory was established at Cossipore it worked in tandem with the Gun & Shell Factory at Dum Dum. After the disastrous First Anglo-Afghan War, the first ammunition factory in British India was set up here. It produced expanding bullets, which came to be known as "dumdums" after the city where they were manufactured. The 1857 mutiny was sparked by inputs from this factory. The site was also used as a jail and many freedom fighters were hanged here. Hearsay includes the Santal leader Kanhu Murmu. The ammunition factory was shifted to Pune in 1869, but the ordnance factory continued to function at Dum Dum.
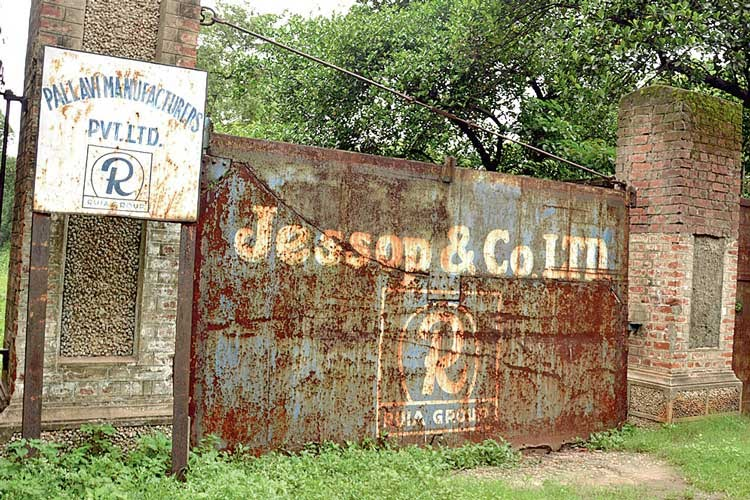
  Jessop & Co Ltd
- Jessop & Company, located at Dum Dum, was a leading engineering company since 1788, when Breen & Company was founded in Calcutta. In 1820, Henry and George, sons of William Jessop, acquired, on behalf of Butterley Company, Breen & Company. Butterley Company was founded in Derbyshire, England. Butterley Company and Breen & Company merged to form Jessop & Company in 1820. The company was a pioneer in the engineering field and had many feathers in its cap. During 1815–1840 it built the first iron bridge (loha-ka-pul) in India, across the Gomti at Lucknow. It floated the first steam boat in Indian waters in 1819, manufactured the first steam roller for Indian roads in 1890, and produced the first electrical multiple unit (EMU) coach for Indian railways in 1959. In 1973, the company was taken over by the Government of India and in 1986, it became a subsidiary of the holding company Bharat Bhari Udyog Nigam. In 2003, as part of the strategic disinvestment of the NDA government, the Kolkata-based Ruia Group, headed by Pawan Kumar Ruia, took charge of loss-making Jessop. Pawan Kumar Ruia has successfully turned around Jessop.
- Perfect Chemical Industries Pvt. Ltd. was an Indian chemical manufacturing company based in Calcutta (now Kolkata), India, located at 39 Dum Dum Road. It specialized in the production of basic dyes such as Methyl Violet, Methylene Blue, Auramine, and Malachite Green.
- The Dum Dum recording studio of Saregama, a part of the factory with production facilities, was established in 1928. It holds "around 30,000 master tapes of original Indian music recorded by the company since Gauhar Jaan sang raga Jogiya in Kolkata and became the first Indian voice to be recorded on shellac disc in 1902." In the studio "text and photographs of artistes from Hindustani and Carnatic classical, Hindi and south Indian playback, devotional and Bengali music, who have recorded with the company, are also exhibited along with a copy of the original agreement that Tagore signed with the company before cutting his first musical record at the Dum Dum studio in 1928." The tapes are in at least 19 major Indian languages. The collection includes speeches of Mahatma Gandhi, Jawaharlal Nehru and Subhas Chandra Bose. In the world of music the list is too long for elaboration here but it includes the voice of Kazi Nazrul Islam. Saregama of the RP-Sanjiv Goenka Group, under the chairmanship of Sanjiv Goenka, were the successors to the Gramophone Company India, which was among the first overseas branches of the British record firm Electric and Music Industries (EMI).

=== Infrastructure ===
As per the District Census Handbook 2011, Dum Dum municipal city covered an area of 9.23 km². Among the civic amenities, it had open drains. In terms of medical facilities, there were 13 pharmacies. Regarding educational facilities, it had 31 primary schools, 10 secondary schools, 19 senior secondary schools, 1 degree college for arts, science, and commerce, and 77 non-formal education centres. For social, recreational, and cultural facilities, it included 10 auditoriums/community halls, 11 public libraries, and 1 reading room. Among the manufactured commodities were rail wagons, artillery shells, and music CDs. Additionally, there were 6 bank branches.

=== KMDA ===
Dum Dum municipality is included in the Kolkata Metropolitan Area for which the KMDA is the statutory planning and development authority.

== Transport ==
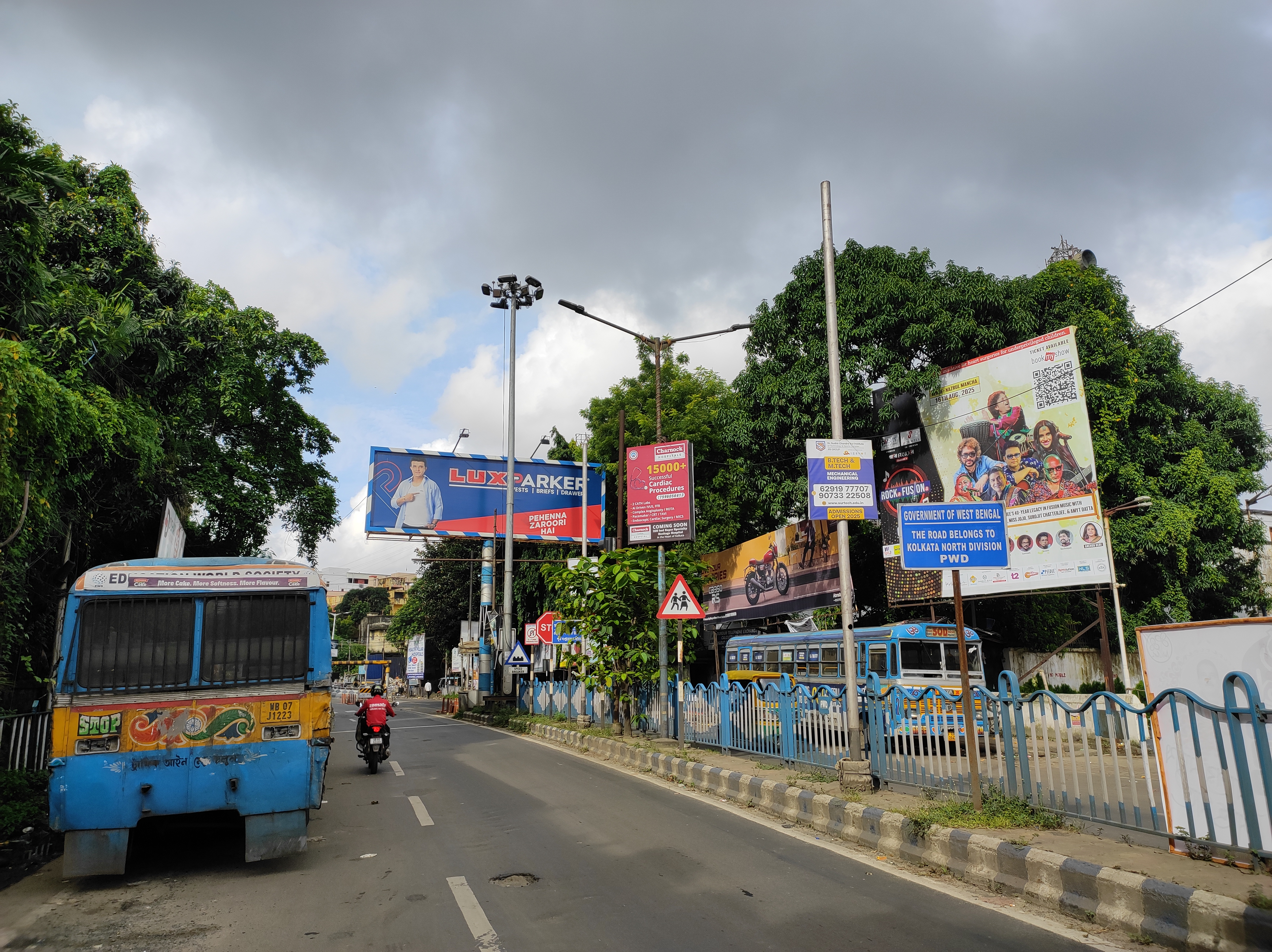
Jessore Road in Dum Dum

NH 12 (previously NH 34) running from Dalkhola to Bakkhali, locally popular as Jessore Road, passes through Dum Dum.

Frequent Buses which ply along Jessore Rd (via Central Jail and Nagerbazar) are as follows:

- 30D Dum Dum Cant. - Babughat
- 30B Gouripur - Babughat
- 223 B.T College - Golf Green
- 3C/1 Nagerbazar - Anandapur
- 221 Nagerbazar - Southern Avenue
- 202 Nagerbazar - Science City
- 219 Nagerbazar - Howrah Stn.
- 219/1 Nagerbazar - Howrah Stn.
- Nagerbazar - Howrah Mini (S-168)
- AC 38 Dum Dum 11A - Karunamoyee
- 79B Barasat - Bagbazar
- DN-8 Barasat - Salt Lake Sector V
- 93 Kharibari - Bagbazar
- Rajchandrapur - Karunamoyee Bus

Important Bus routes of Airport area are as follows:

- AC 39 (Airport Terminal - Howrah Stn.)
- VS 2 (Airport Terminal - Howrah Stn.)
- V1 (Airport Terminal - Tollygunge)
- VS 1 (Airport Terminal - Esplanade)
- AC 37C (Airport Terminal - Garia)
- AC 37A (Airport Terminal - Garia)
- AC 43 (Airport Terminal - Golf Green)
- AC 38 (Dum Dum 11A - Karunamoyee)
- S-10 (Airport Gate no 3 - Nabanna)
- D-10 (Barasat - Amtala)
- AC 37 (Barasat - Garia)
- D-37 (Barasat - Baruipur)
- EB-12 (Barasat - Karunamoyee)
- ACT-4 (Barasat - Karunamoyee)
- ACT-23 (Dankuni Housing - Park Circus)
- AC 23A (Rajchandrapur - Karunamoyee)
- AC 50A (Rajchandrapur - Garia)
- S23A (Rajchandrapur - Karunamoyee)
- S 64 (Naihati - Newtown)
- AC 2 (Barasat - Howrah Stn)
- AC 40 (Airport - Howrah Maidan)
- S 66 (Choto Finga - Howrah Stn)
- D-1A (Airport - Tollygunge)
- 237 (Birati - Babughat)
- 45 (Airport - Garia Stn.)
- 45A (Airport - Garia Stn.)
- 46 (Airport - Esplanade)
- L238 (Barasat - Howrah Stn.)
- 79D (Madhyamgram - Babughat)
- S-151 Mini (Airport - B.B.D Bag)
- S-184 Mini (Birati - B.B.D Bag)
- S-175 Mini (New Barrackpore - Howrah Stn.)
- C-42 (Barasat - Howrah)
- C-23 (Dankuni - Park Circus)
- DN-47 (Barasat - Karunamoyee)
- DN-18 (Baduria - Shyambazar)
- 91 (Bhangar - Shyambazar)
- 91A (Harao Banstala - Shyambazar)
- Barasat - Botanical Garden Bus
- Rajchandrapur - Karunamoyee Bus
- Barasat - Baruipur Bus
- Airport Gate No. 1 - Amta Bus etc.

Dum Dum Junction, on the Sealdah-Ranaghat line, and Dum Dum Cantonment, on the Sealdah-Bangaon line, are the nearest railway stations.

Kolkata Metro, the first underground metro in India, was initially constructed from Dum Dum to Tollygunge. It was progressively commissioned, the full length of 16.45 km being commissioned in 1995. Dum Dum metro station is located adjacent to Dum Dum Junction railway station.

Dum Dum Cantonment, Jessore Road and Biman Bandar are metro stations of Yellow Line of Kolkata Metro. Biman Bandar serves Kolkata's main airport, the Netaji Subhas Chandra Bose International Airport.

=== Travel within Dum Dum and South Dum Dum ===
There are a plenty of blue-yellow private buses, mini-buses and taxis, as well as a few WBTC buses in Dum Dum. Autos are plentiful and can be used for short stretches. Nagerbazar is the hub of autos where four routes originate, namely:

1. Nagerbazar – Dum Dum Junction
2. Nagerbazar – Dum Dum Cantonment
3. Nagerbazar – Airport 1 no. gate
4. Nagerbazar – Lake Town

In addition, there are large taxi stands at Nagerbazar and Dum Dum Airport. The other popular means of travel over short distances is the rickshaw; battery operated rickshaws/e-rickshaws (locally called Totos) can also be seen.

== Education ==
The following institutions are located in Dum Dum:

- Sarojini Naidu College for Women was established at Dum Dum in 1956. It offers honours courses in Bengali, English, Sanskrit, geography, history, philosophy, political science, economics, botany, chemistry, mathematics, philosophy, zoology and anthropology.
- Kendriya Vidyalaya Ordnance Factory, Dum Dum was established in 1986, for the children of employees of the Ordnance Factory Dum Dum, defence personnel and other central government offices. It has arrangements for teaching from Classes I to XII. A co-educational day school, it functions under Kendriya Vidyalaya Sangthan and prepares students for CBSE examinations through Hindi and English mediums.
- Christ Church Girls' High School, Jessore Road, is a Bengali-medium, girls only school preparing students for madhyamik and higher secondary examination of the West Bengal boards. Established in 1882, it has arrangements for teaching from Infant to Class XII. Admission for Primary section starts around December. It has hostel facilities.
- Auxilium Convent School at Rajbari, Dum Dum, is an English-medium girls only school run by Salesian Sisters. Established in 1960, it prepares students for the ISC and ICSE examinations. Admission eligibility for LKG is 3 years age on 31 March.
- Indira Gandhi Memorial High School, Dum Dum is a co-ed English medium school affiliated to CBSE New Delhi.
- St. Stephen's School, Dum Dum established in 1971, is a co-educational English Medium higher secondary school under Barrackpore Diocesan Education Society. It is affiliated to CISCE. Out of its multiple branches throughout West Bengal, it has two of them in Dum Dum; namely Wesley Primary Department and Main Branch.
- Rishi Aurobindo Memorial Academy is a co-educational English medium self-financed higher secondary school at P.K Guha Rd.
- Dum Dum Girls' High School, Estd. in 1950, is one of the oldest girls higher secondary schools at Dum Dum.
- Dum Dum Baidyanath Institution and Dum Dum Baidyanath Institution for Girls, established in 1939 and 1967 respectively, are oldest higher secondary schools at Dum Dum.
- Kamalapur Kamala Vidyapith and Kamalapur Kamala Balika Vidyapith, established in 1955 and 1956 respectively, are higher secondary schools at Kamalapur, Dum Dum Cant.
- Nalta Mahajati High School for Girls and Nalta Mahajati High School for Boys, Estd. in 1960 and 1968 respectively, are higher secondary schools at Nalta, Dum Dum Cantonment.
- Dum Dum Airport Hindi High School, Estd. in 1949, is a hindi medium higher secondary school at Jessore Road.
- Dum Dum Airport Girls' High School is a secondary school at Kolkata Airport Quarters, Dum Dum.
- Calcutta Airport English High School is a co-educational English medium higher secondary school at Gate No. 2 of NSCBI Airport on Jessore Road, Dum Dum.
- Dum Dum K.L.S. Hindi Vidyalaya, Estd. in 1959, is a co-educational higher secondary school at Post office Rd, Dum Dum.
- Dum Dum Bharatiya Vidyamandir, Estd. in 1968, is a co-educational Hindi medium secondary school at Gorabazar, Dum Dum Cantonment.
- Adarsh Madhyamik Vidyalaya Dum Dum (H.S), Estd. in 1969 is a Hindi medium higher secondary school at R.B.C Road, Dum Dum.
- Pandit Motilal Institution for Girls, Estd. in 1962, is a girls secondary school at Motilal Colony, Dum Dum.
- Dum Dum Motilal Vidyayatan High School, Estd. in 1950, is a boys high school at Jessore Rd.
- Dum Dum Nikhil Bangia Vidyapeeth, a statutory entity for Skill Training and Education with all due diligence and compliances, was established in the year 2001 at Dum Dum.

== Healthcare ==
Hospitals:

- Dum Dum Central Jail Hospital functions with 100 beds.
- Dum Dum Municipal Specialized Hospital (near Gora Bazar), Dum Dum Cantonment.

== Markets ==
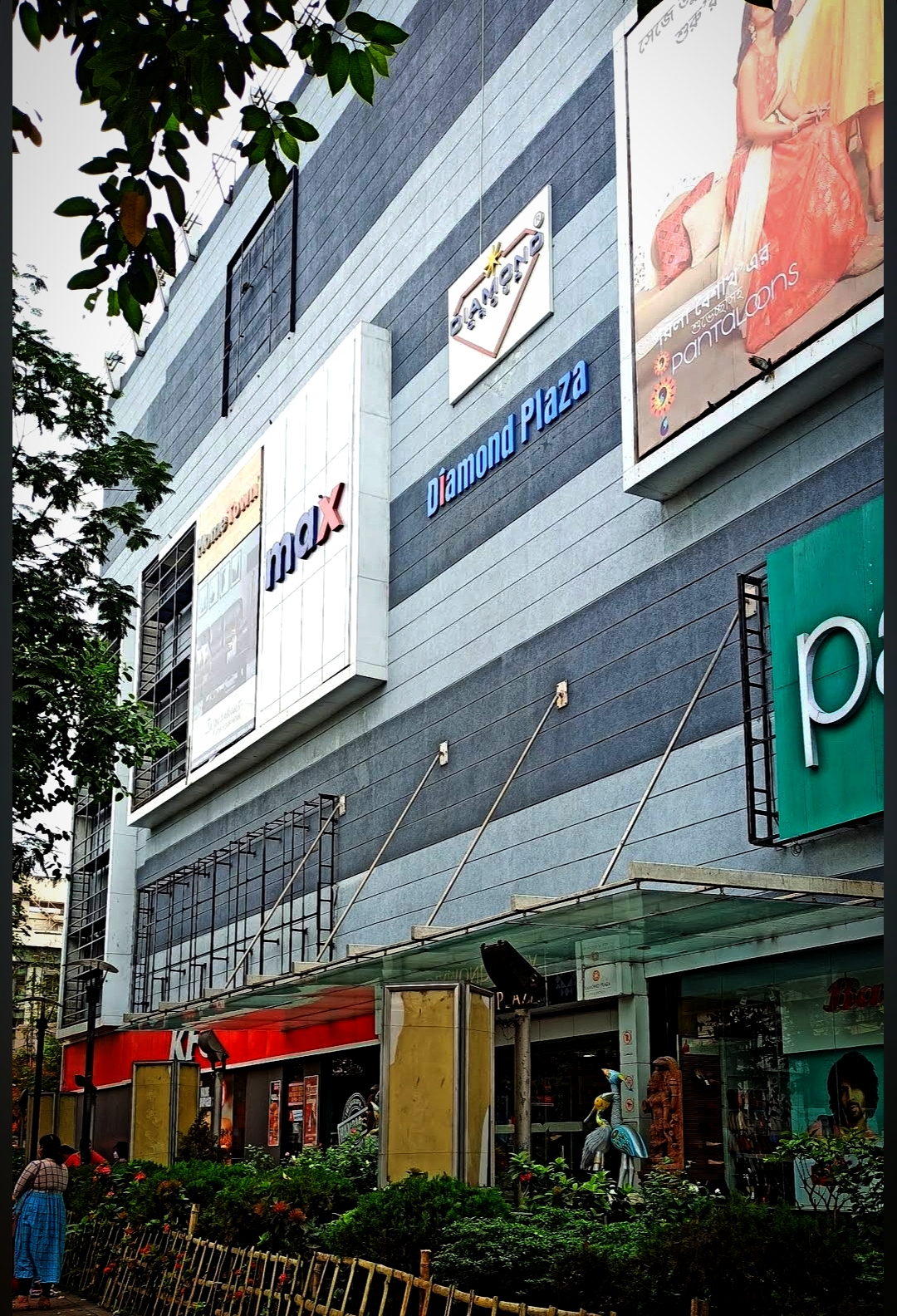
Diamond Plaza Mall, Jessore Rd

Major markets in the Dum Dum area include:

- Diamond Plaza Mall
- Nagerbazar market
- Gorabazar market
- Mall Road market

== See also ==
- South Dum Dum
- North Dum Dum
- Dum Dum Arsenal
- Dum-dum bullets
- Dum-dum fever
