= Nalta, Dum Dum =

Nalta
- Neighbourhood
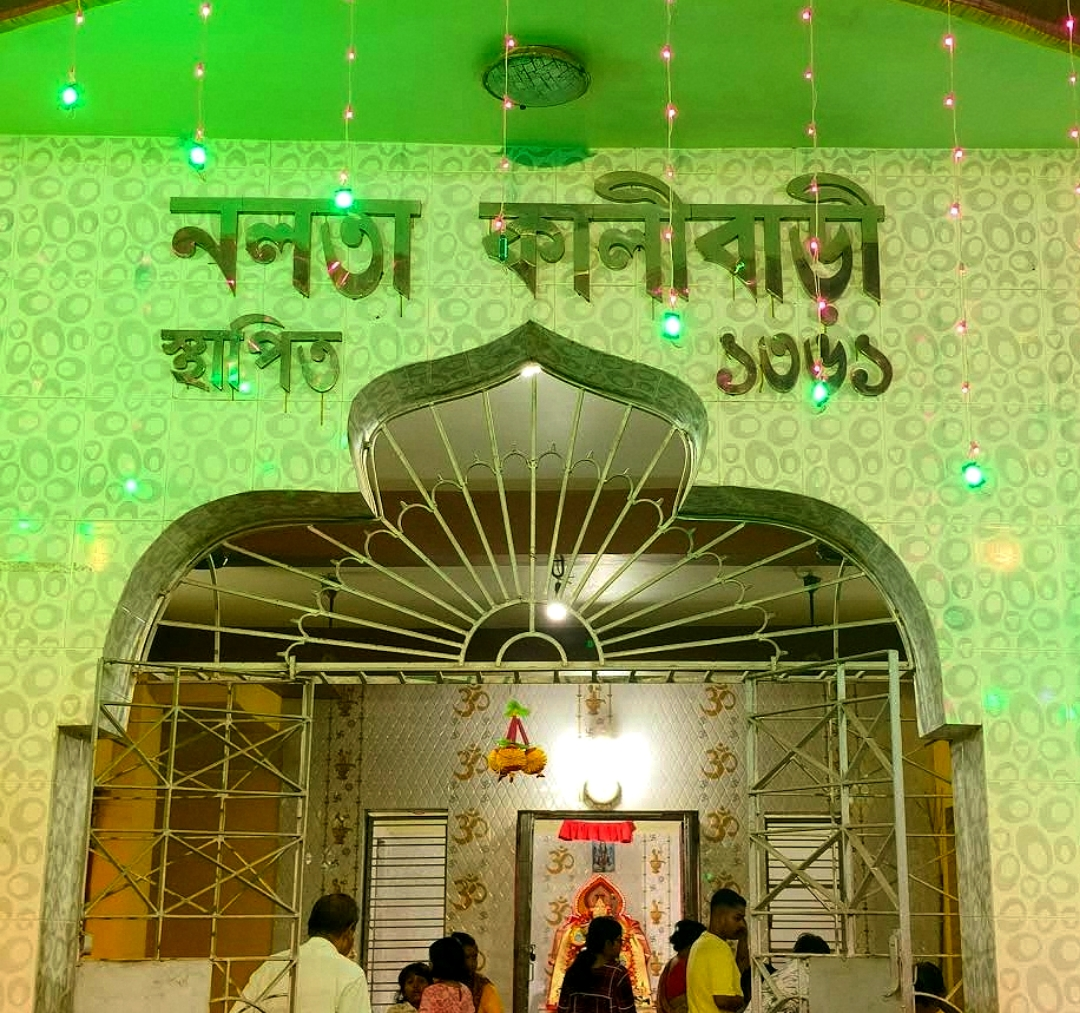
- Nalta Kalibari

- Location in Kolkata Nalta (West Bengal) Nalta (India)
- Coordinates: 22.6464°N 88.4198°E
- Country: India
- State: West Bengal
- Division: Presidency
- District: North 24 Parganas
- Metro Station: Dum Dum Cantonment
- Railway Station: Dum Dum Cantonment; Durganagar

Government
  - Type: Municipality
  - Body: Dum Dum Municipality

Languages
  - Official: Bengali, English
- Time zone: UTC+5:30 (IST)
- PIN: 700028
- Telephone code: +91 33
- Vehicle registration: WB
- Lok Sabha constituency: Dum Dum
- Vidhan Sabha constituency: Dum Dum

Nalta is a locality in Dum Dum of North 24 Parganas district in the Indian state of West Bengal. It is a part of the area covered by Kolkata Metropolitan Development Authority (KMDA). Adjoined localities are Badra, Kumarpara and Italgacha.

== Geography ==
=== Post office ===
Dum Dum has a delivery Head post office, with PIN 700028 in the Kolkata North Division of Kolkata district in Calcutta region. Other post offices with the same PIN are Kumarpara, Ordnance Factory, Kamalapur and Rajabagan.

=== Police station ===
Dum Dum police station under Barrackpore Police Commissionerate has jurisdiction over Nalta areas.

== Markets ==
Markets near Nalta area are:

- Kumarpara Market
- Durganagar Market
