= Manikpur, Dum Dum =

Manikpur
- Neighbourhood
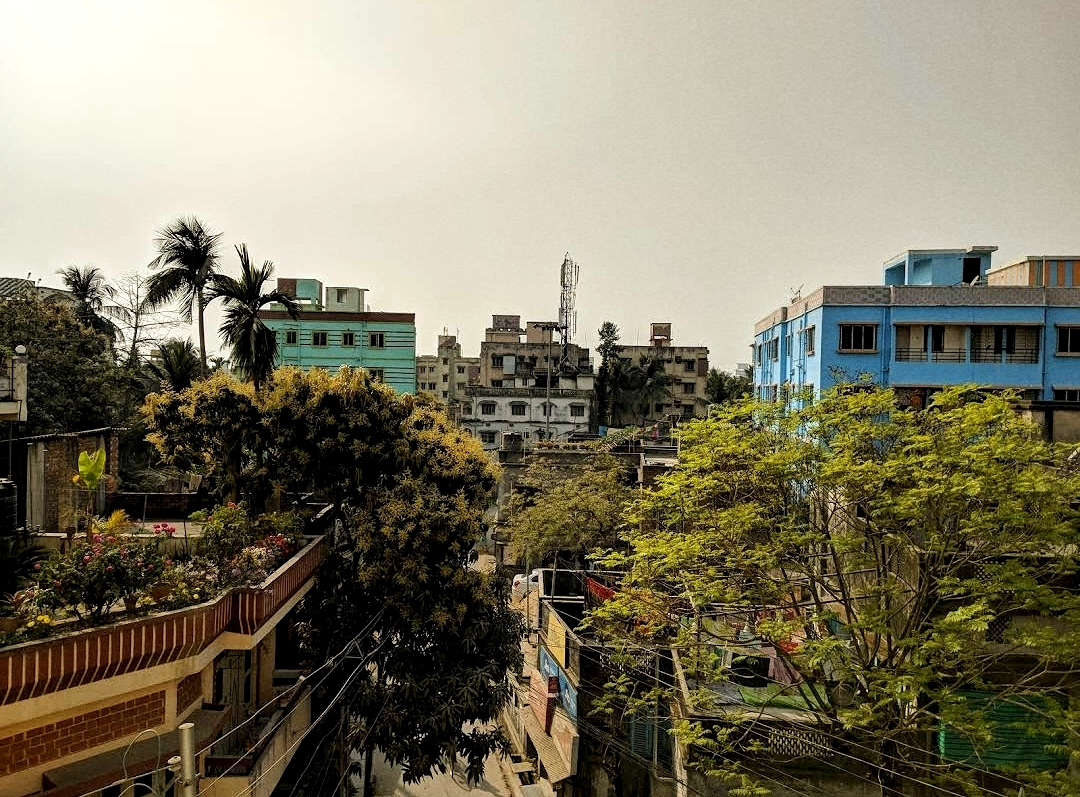

- Location in Kolkata Manikpur (West Bengal) Manikpur (India)
- Coordinates: 22.6517°N 88.4325°E
- Country: India
- State: West Bengal
- Division: Presidency
- District: North 24 Parganas
- Metro Station: Jai Hind
- Railway Station: Durganagar

Government
  - Type: Municipality
  - Body: Dum Dum Municipality

Languages
  - Official: Bengali, English
- Time zone: UTC+5:30 (IST)
- PIN: 700079
- Telephone code: +91 33
- Vehicle registration: WB
- Lok Sabha constituency: Dum Dum
- Vidhan Sabha constituency: Dum Dum

Manikpur is a neighbourhood in Dum Dum of the North 24 Parganas district in the Indian state of West Bengal. It is a part of the area covered by Kolkata Metropolitan Development Authority (KMDA).

== Geography ==
=== Post office ===
Italgacha has a delivery sub post office, with PIN 700079 in the Kolkata North Division of Kolkata district in Calcutta region.

=== Police station ===
Dum Dum police station under Barrackpore Police Commissionerate has jurisdiction over Manikpur areas.

== Transport ==
=== Bus ===
Buses ply along Belghoria Expressway are:

==== WBTC Bus ====
- AC23A Rajchandrapur - Salt Lake Karunamoyee
- AC50A Rajchandrapur - Garia 6 no. Bus stand
- ACT-23 Park Circus - Dankuni
- C23 Park Circus - Dankuni
- S23A Rajchandrapur - Salt Lake Karunamoyee

==== Private Bus ====
- 285 Serampore - Salt Lake Sector-V
- DN2/1 Dakshineswar - New Town
- DN9/1 Barasat - Rajchandrapur
- DN44 Dakshineswar - Bangaon
- DN46 Dankuni Housing - Salt Lake Karunamoyee

Many unnumbered shuttle buses also pass through Mathkal along Belghoria Expy.

== Markets ==
Markets near Manikpur area are:

- Durganagar Market
- Motilal Neheru Market
