= Kamalapur, Dum Dum =

Kamalapur
- Neighbourhood
- Location in Kolkata Kamalapur (West Bengal) Kamalapur (India)
- Coordinates: 22.6396°N 88.4263°E
- Country: India
- State: West Bengal
- Division: Presidency
- District: North 24 Parganas
- Metro Station: Jessore Road; Dum Dum Cantonment
- Railway Station: Dum Dum Cantonment

Government
  - Type: Municipality
  - Body: Dum Dum Municipality

Languages
  - Official: Bengali, English
- Time zone: UTC+5:30 (IST)
- PIN: 700028
- Telephone code: +91 33
- Vehicle registration: WB
- Lok Sabha constituency: Dum Dum
- Vidhan Sabha constituency: Dum Dum

Kamalapur is a neighbourhood in Dum Dum of North 24 Parganas district in the Indian state of West Bengal. It is a part of the area covered by Kolkata Metropolitan Development Authority (KMDA).

== Geography ==
=== Post office ===
Dum Dum has a delivery Head post office, with PIN 700028 in the Kolkata North Division of Kolkata district in Calcutta region. Other post offices with the same PIN are Kumarpara, Ordnance Factory, Kamalapur and Rajabagan.

=== Police station ===
Dum Dum police station under Barrackpore Police Commissionerate has jurisdiction over Kamalapur areas.

== Markets ==
Markets near Kamalapur area are:

- Market near the former His Master's Voice/Saregama factory
- 1 no. Airport Market
- Kumarpara Market
- Gorabazar Market
