= Gopalpur, Kolkata =

Gopalpur
- Neighbourhood
- Location in West Bengal, India Gopalpur (West Bengal) Gopalpur (India)
- Coordinates: 22.6453°N 88.4613°E
- Country: India
- State: West Bengal
- Division: Presidency
- District: North 24 Parganas

Government
  - Type: Municipal Corporation
  - Body: Bidhannagar Municipal Corporation

Languages
  - Official: Bengali, English
- Time zone: UTC+5:30 (IST)
- PIN: 700136
- Telephone code: +91 33
- Vehicle registration: WB
- Lok Sabha constituency: Barasat
- Vidhan Sabha constituency: Rajarhat Gopalpur
- Website: bmcwbgov.in

Gopalpur (a.k.a. Rajarhat-Gopalpur) is a neighbourhood in Bidhannagar Municipal Corporation of North 24 Parganas district in the Indian state of West Bengal. It is a part of the area covered by Kolkata Metropolitan Development Authority (KMDA).
