= Dum Dum Municipality =

Municipal body in West Bengal, India

Dum Dum Municipality দমদম পৌরসভা
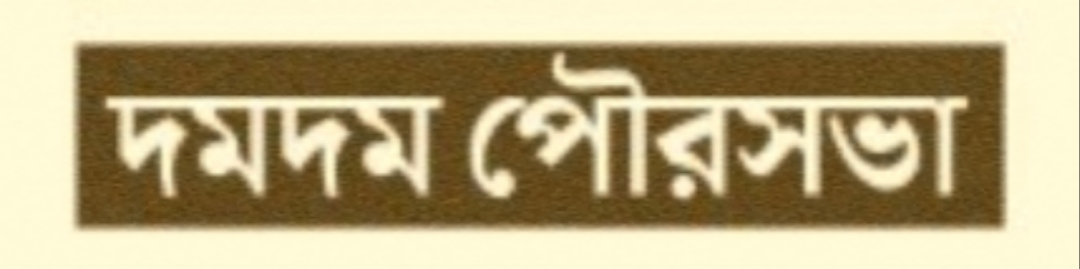
- Coat of Arms

Type
- Type: Municipality

History
- Founded: 1929; 97 years ago
- Preceded by: Dum Dum Cantonment Board

Leadership
- Chairman: Sri Harendra Singh (AITC)
- Vice Chairman: Sri Barun Natta (AITC)

Structure
- Seats: 22
- Political groups: Government (22): AITC (22)

Elections
- Last election: 2022
- Next election: 2027

Meeting place
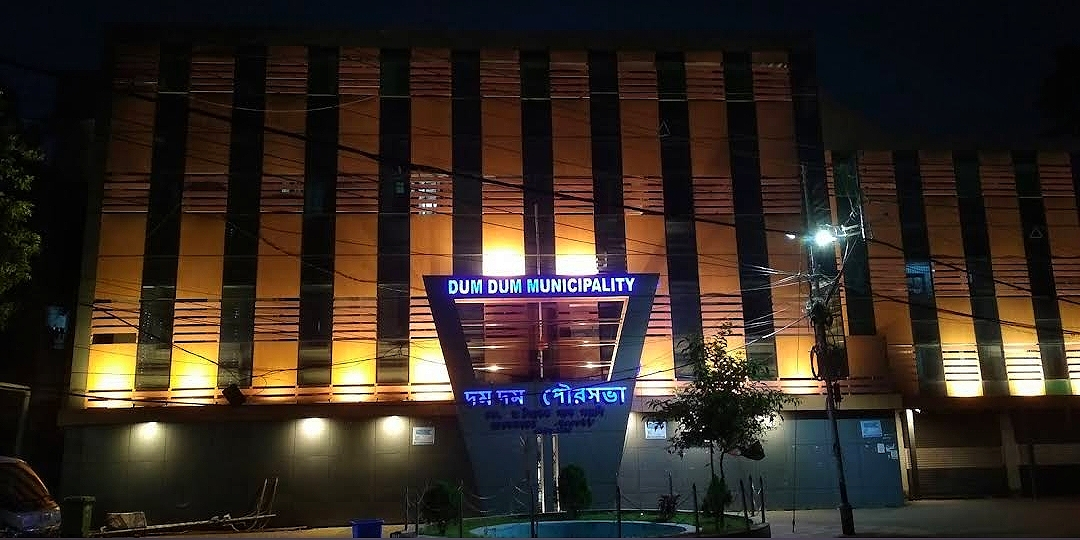

Website
- dumdummunicipality.wordpress.com

Dum Dum Municipality is the civic body that governs Dum Dum areas (Gora Bazar, Nalta, Mall Road, Kumarpara, Kamalapur, Italgacha, Manikpur, Motilal Colony, Rajbari Colony, Arabinda Sarani, Central Jail, Airport 1 No. Gate, Airport 2 No. Gate and Airport 2.5 No. Gate) in the Barrackpore subdivision of North 24 Parganas district in West Bengal, India.

== Administration and Councillors ==
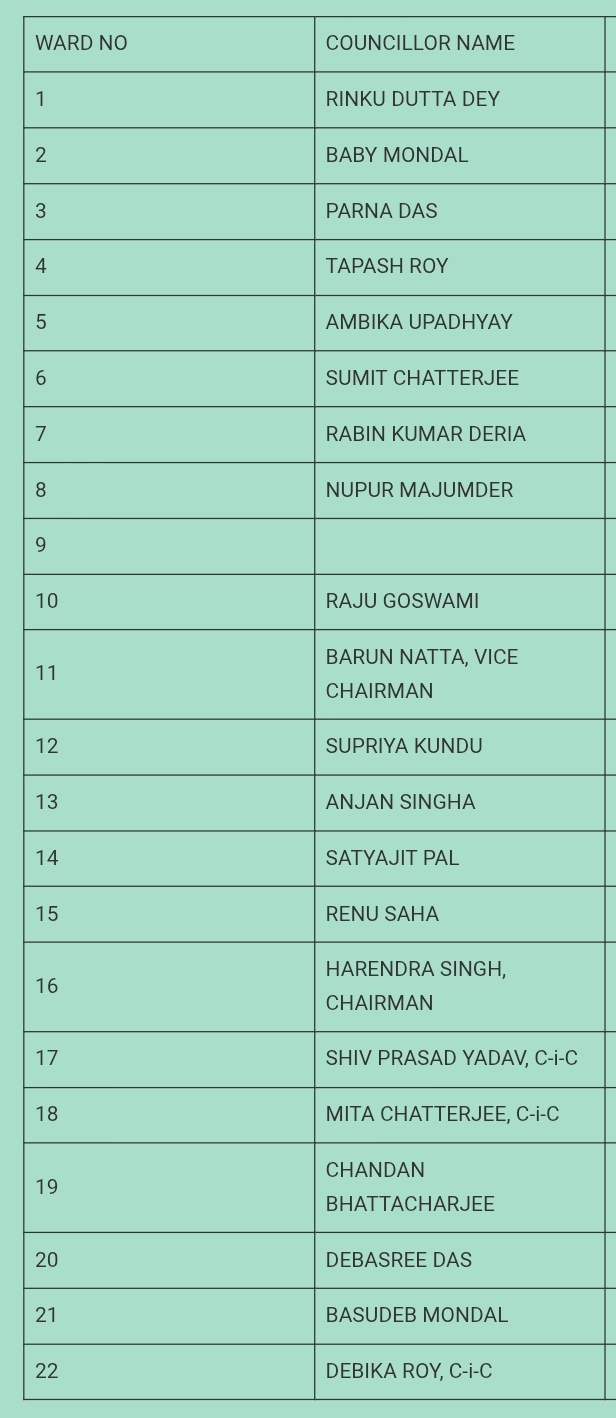
