= Arijit Bakshi =

Indian politician in West Bengal

Member of the West Bengal Legislative Assembly
- Incumbent
- Assumed office 4 May 2026
- Preceded by: Bratya Basu
- Constituency: Dum Dum

Personal details
- Born: 1985 (age 40–41) West Bengal, India
- Party: Bharatiya Janata Party
- Profession: Politician, Lawyer

Arijit Bakshi is an Indian politician, and a member of the West Bengal Legislative Assembly, representing the Dum Dum constituency. He is a member of the Bharatiya Janata Party.
