= Jessore Road metro station =

Metro station in Kolkata, India

Jessore Road
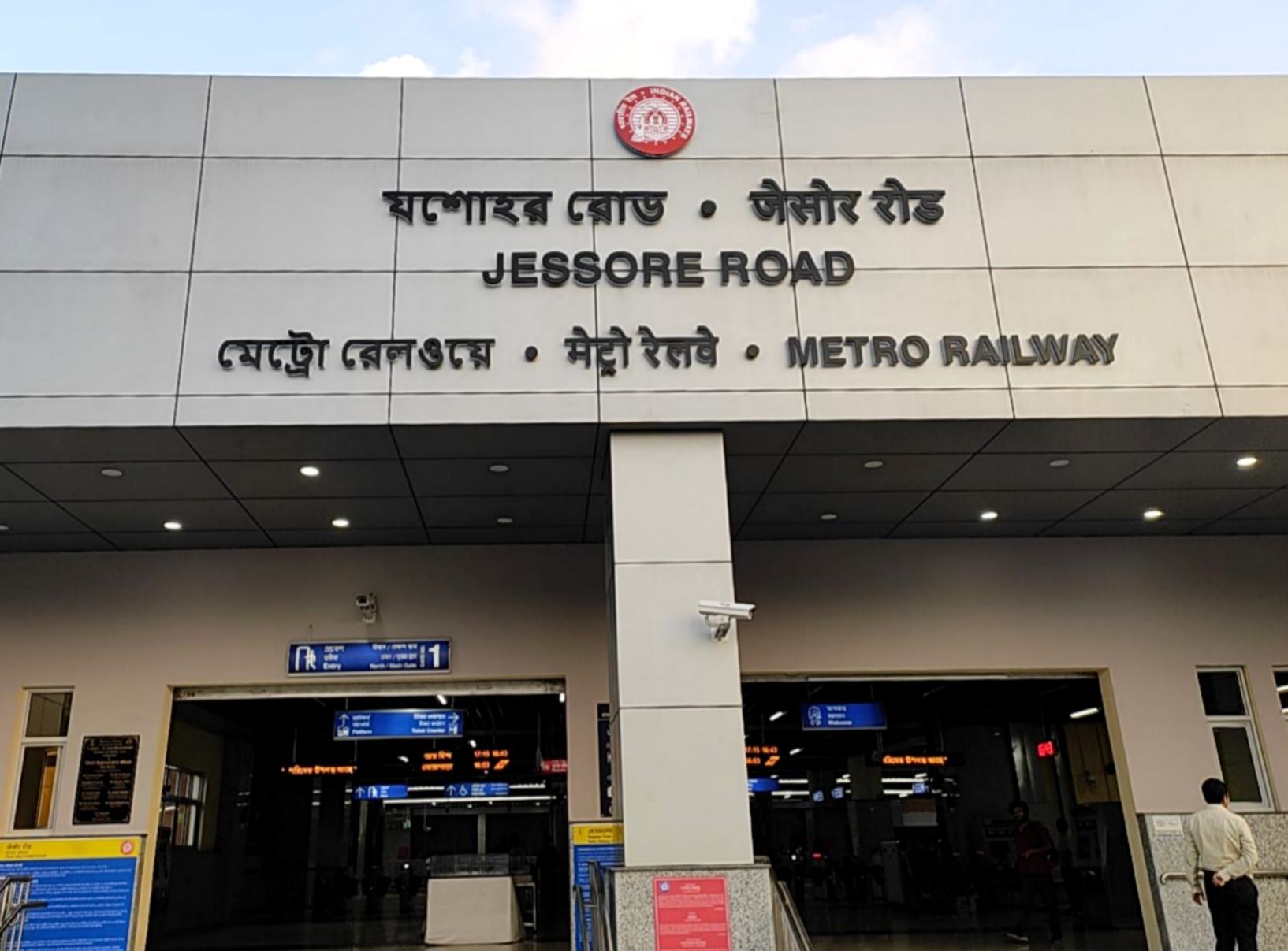

General information
- Location: Jessore Rd, Dum Dum, West Bengal 700028
- Coordinates: 22°38′22″N 88°25′47″E
- System: Kolkata Metro
- Operated by: Metro Railway, Kolkata
- Line: Yellow Line
- Platforms: 2 (2 side platforms)
- Connections: Jessore Road; Netaji Subhas Chandra Bose International Airport

Construction
- Structure type: At-grade
- Accessible: Yes

Other information
- Status: Operational
- Station code: KJRO

History
- Opened: 22 August 2025; 8 months ago

Services
Preceding station	Kolkata Metro	Following station
Dum Dum Cantonment towards Noapara	Yellow Line	Jai Hind Terminus
Route map
Location

Jessore Road is an at grade metro station of Yellow Line of Kolkata Metro beside Jessore Road in Dum Dum, West Bengal, India. It was a part of the integration of old line of Circular Railway from Dum Dum Cantonment to Biman Bandar. It is located near 1 no. gate of Dumdum/Kolkata Airport. The station was inaugurated on 22 August 2025.

== Station Layout ==
G	Ground Level	Exit/Entrance, Fare control, station agent, Metro Card vending machines
G	Side platform, Doors will open on the left
G	Platform 1	Train towards Jai Hind (terminus) →
G	Platform 2	← Train towards Noapara (Dum Dum Cantonment)
G	Side platform, Doors will open on the left
UG	Subway	crossover

== Connections ==
=== Bus ===
Bus route numbers 30B, 79B, 79D, 223, 237, 93, DN-8, D10, EB12, S10, S-23A, AC-38, AC-2, AC-37, AC-50A, AC-23A, ACT-4, ACT-23, L238, 45, 45A, 46, S-175 (Mini), S-184 (Mini), D-1A, AC-40, DN-2/1, DN-17, DN-46, DN-47, 91, 91A, DN-18 etc. serve this metro station.

=== Auto ===
5 auto services are available from this metro station/Airport 1 no gate. Autos are available towards Gorabazar, Baguiati, Rajarhat, Bablatala and Narayanpur.

=== Taxi ===
There is a taxi stand at the Baguiati bound flank of VIP Road.

=== Rail ===
In 2006 the Dum Dum Cantonment - Bimanbandar railway line was inaugurated. Jessore Road railway station was the second station of this line. But due to poor patronage and lack of passengers, this line was closed down in 2016. And the line dismantled further in 2020. Jessore Road railway station’s platform was existing upto 2024. Now Dum Dum Cantonment and Durganagar are the nearest railway stations.

=== Air ===
Netaji Subhash Chandra Bose International Airport is nearest airport of this station. The next station Jai Hind is connected to the airport.

== Gallery ==
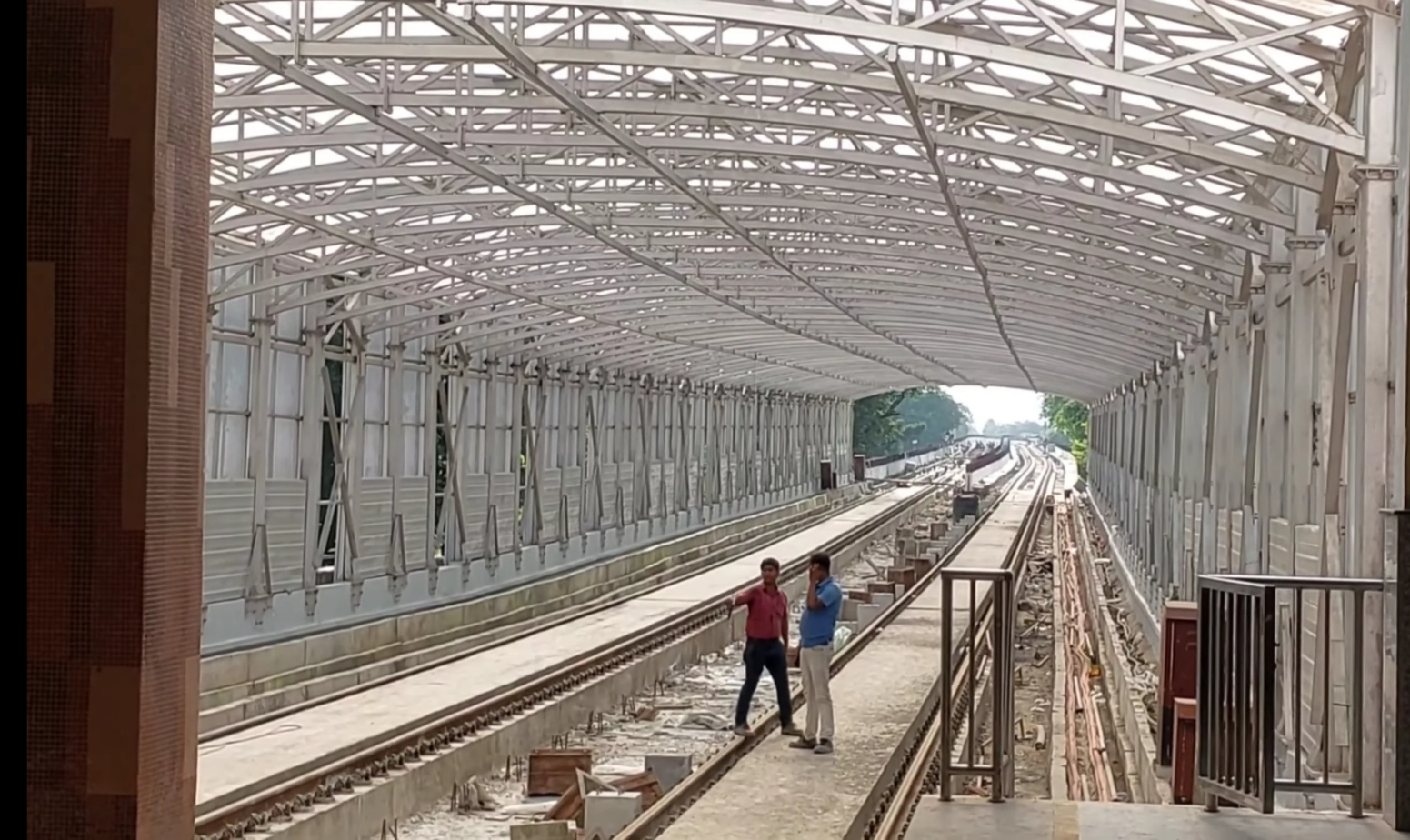
Jessore Road metro station shock absorbers

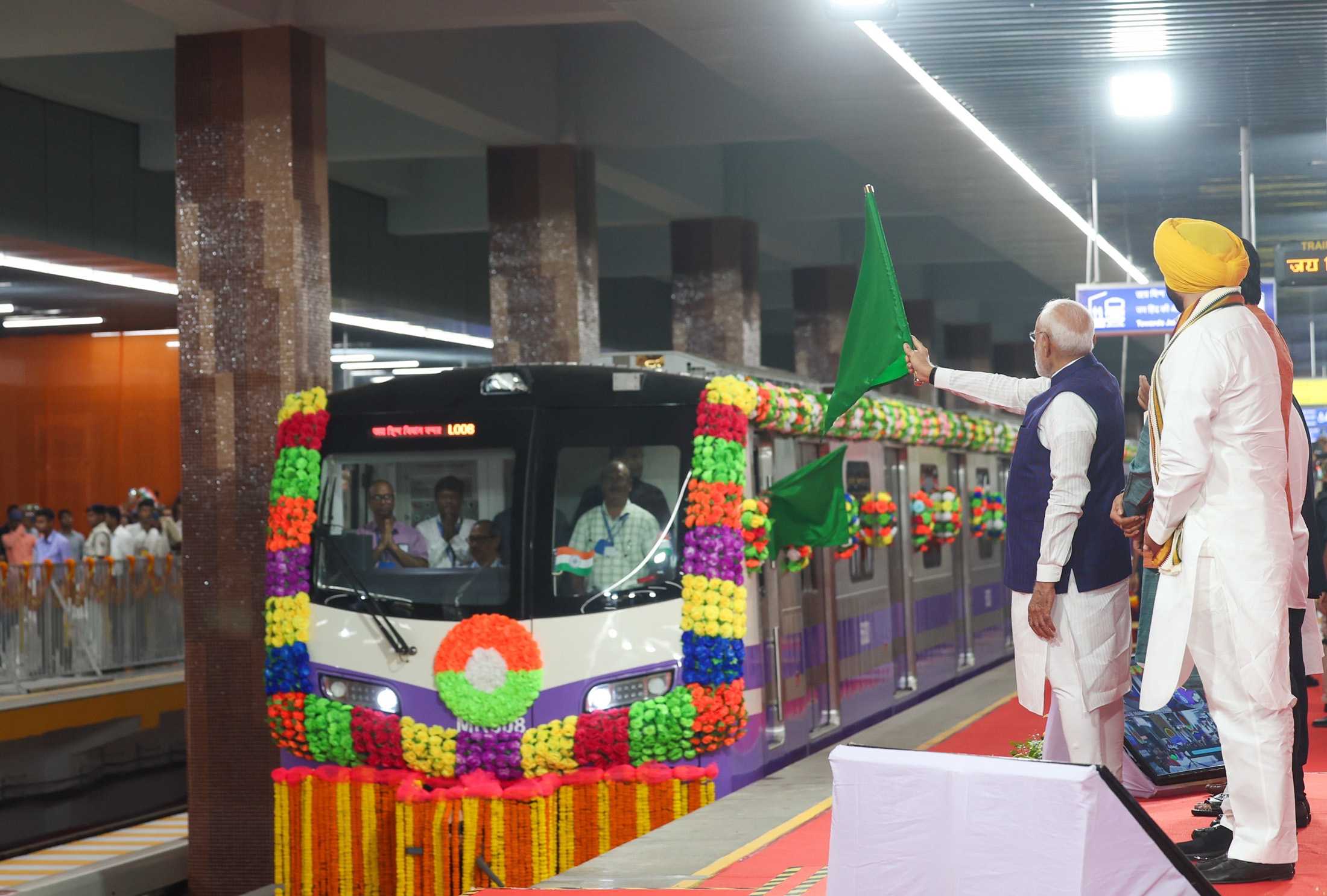
Prime Minister Narendra Modi flagging off metro train on August 22, 2025.

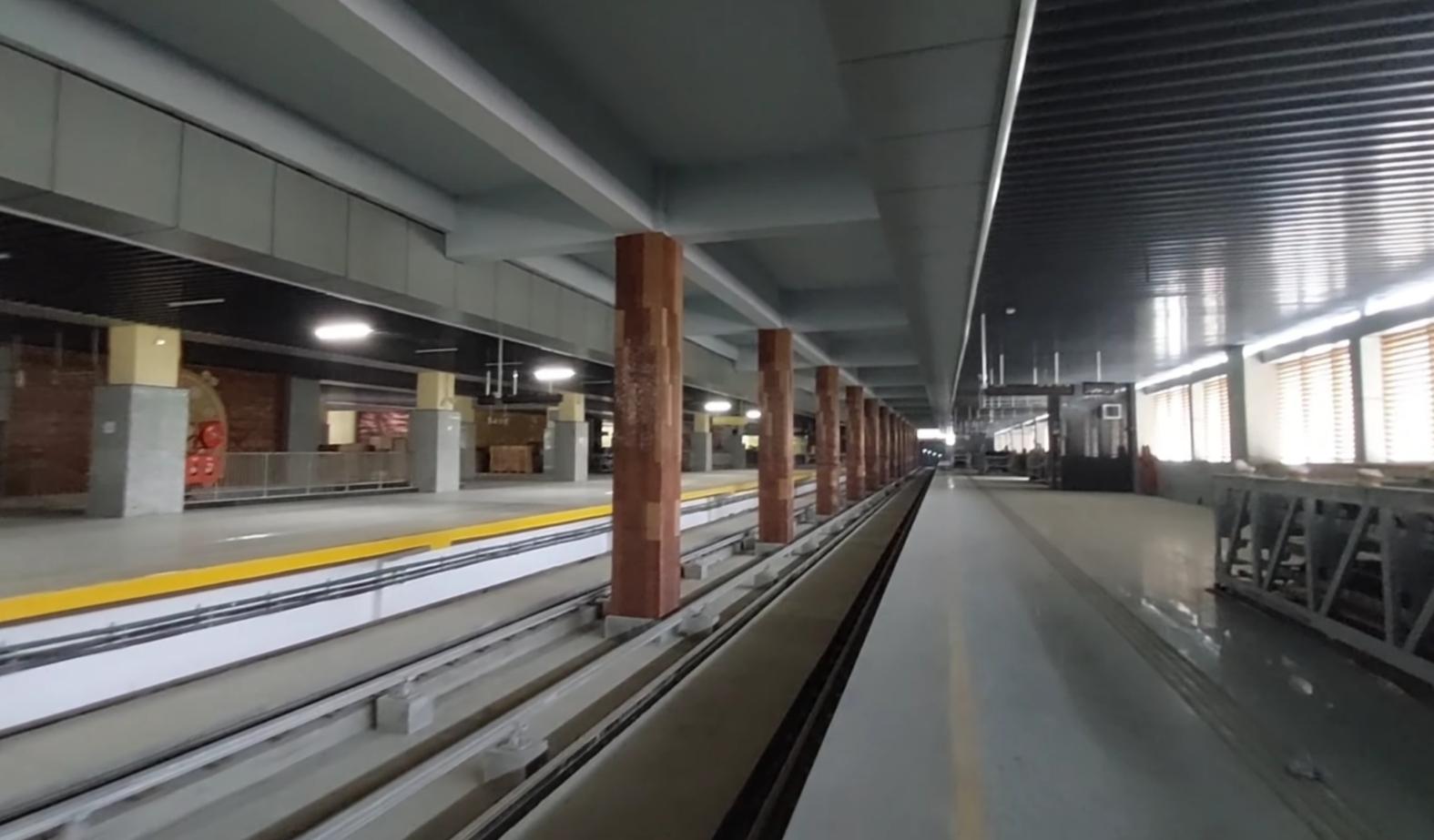
Jessore Road metro station platforms
