= Jai Hind metro station =

Kolkata Metro station

Jai Hind (Bimanbandar)
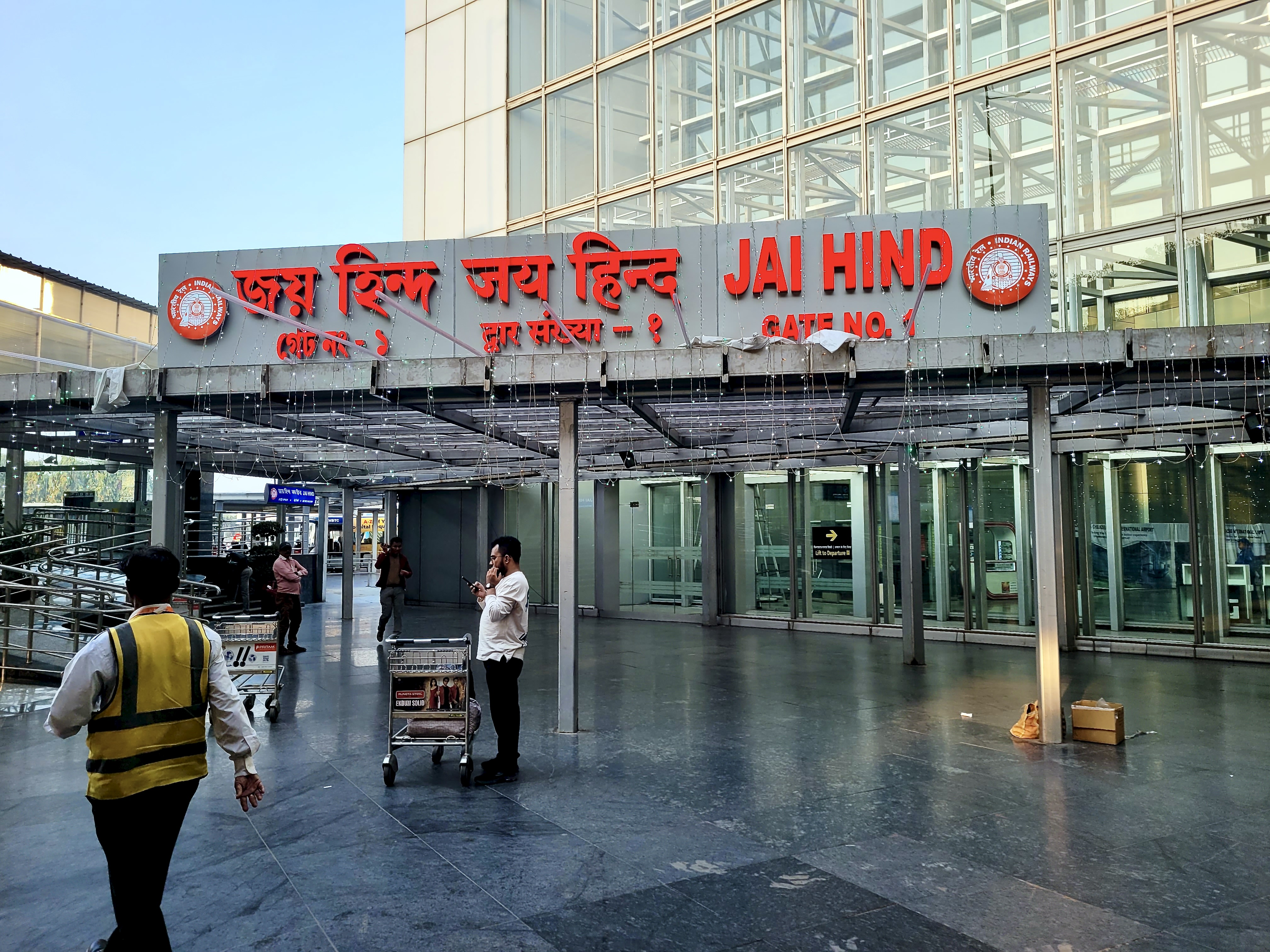
- Jai Hind metro station Gate no. 1

General information
- Location: International Airport, Dum Dum, West Bengal 700052; India
- Coordinates: 22.64619°N 88.43591°E
- System: Kolkata Metro
- Owner: Metro Railway, Kolkata
- Lines: Yellow Line; Orange Line
- Platforms: 4 (1 Side platform & 2 Island platforms)
- Tracks: 5 (Note: 2 for Yellow Line (Operational) 2 for Orange Line (under construction) 1 for Emergency (Under construction))
- Connections: NSCB International Airport

Construction
- Structure type: Underground
- Depth: 13 m (43 ft)
- Parking: Yes
- Accessible: Yes

Other information
- Status: Operational
- Station code: KJHD

History
- Opened: 22 August 2025; 12 months ago

Services
Preceding station	Kolkata Metro	Following station
Jessore Road towards Noapara	Yellow Line	Terminus
Future Service
Jessore Road towards Noapara	Yellow Line	Birati towards Barasat
VIP Road towards Kavi Subhash	Orange Line	Terminus
Route map
Location

Jai Hind (also referred to as Biman Bandar) is an underground metro station of Yellow Line of Kolkata Metro in Dum Dum, Kolkata, West Bengal, India. It is the largest underground metro station in India serving the city of Kolkata's main airport, the Netaji Subhas Chandra Bose International Airport. The station was inaugurated on 22 August 2025. The station will be a future interchange when it hosts Orange Line of Kolkata Metro till Kavi Subhash.

== History ==
=== Construction ===
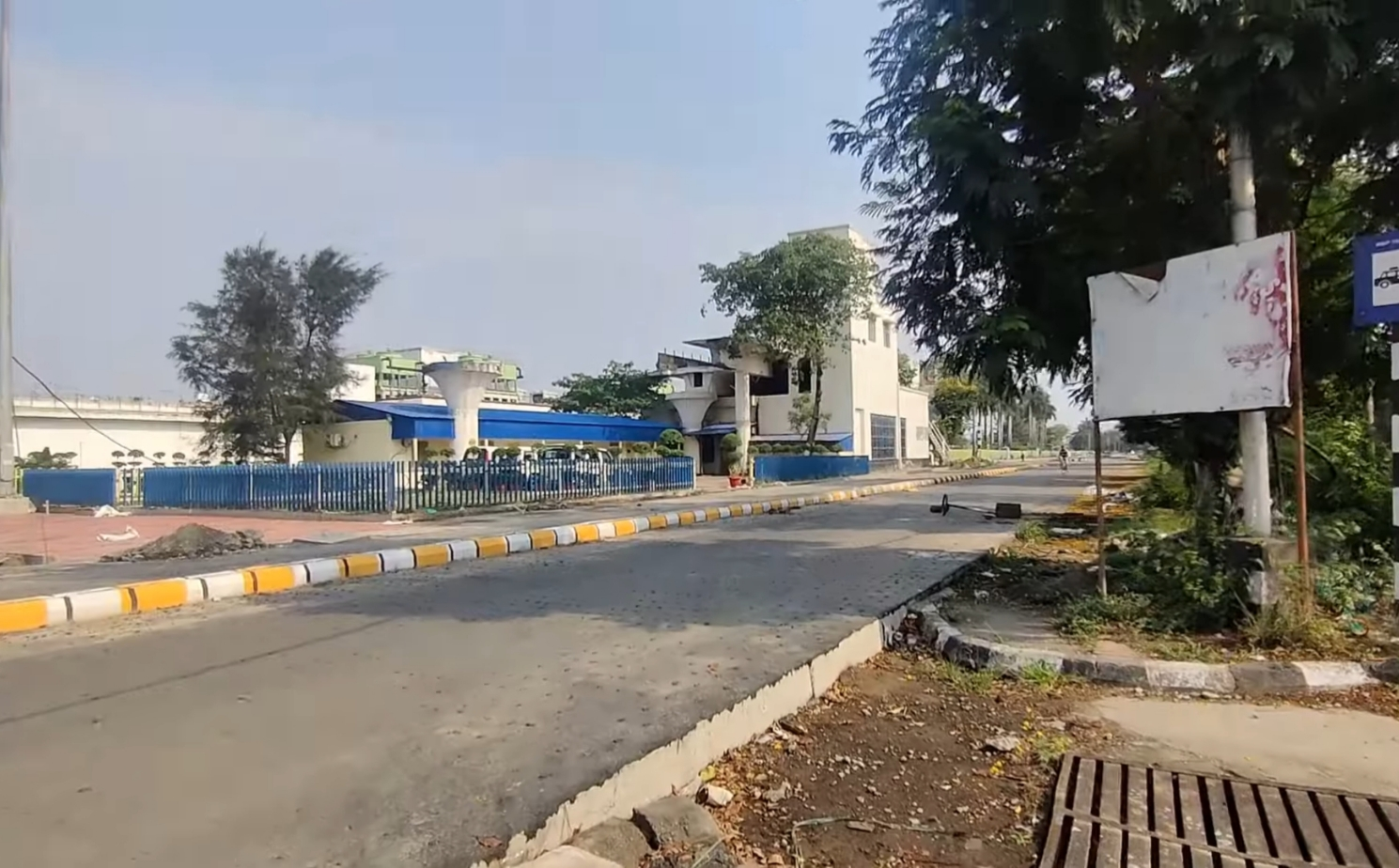
Biman Bandar railway station remants

The execution of this project has been entrusted to Metro Railway Kolkata construction unit and the construction of the station-cum-yard is being done by ITD Cementation India Ltd. The old Kolkata Circular Railway Biman Bandar railway station was demolished and repurposed for this project. The tentative deadline is December 2021.

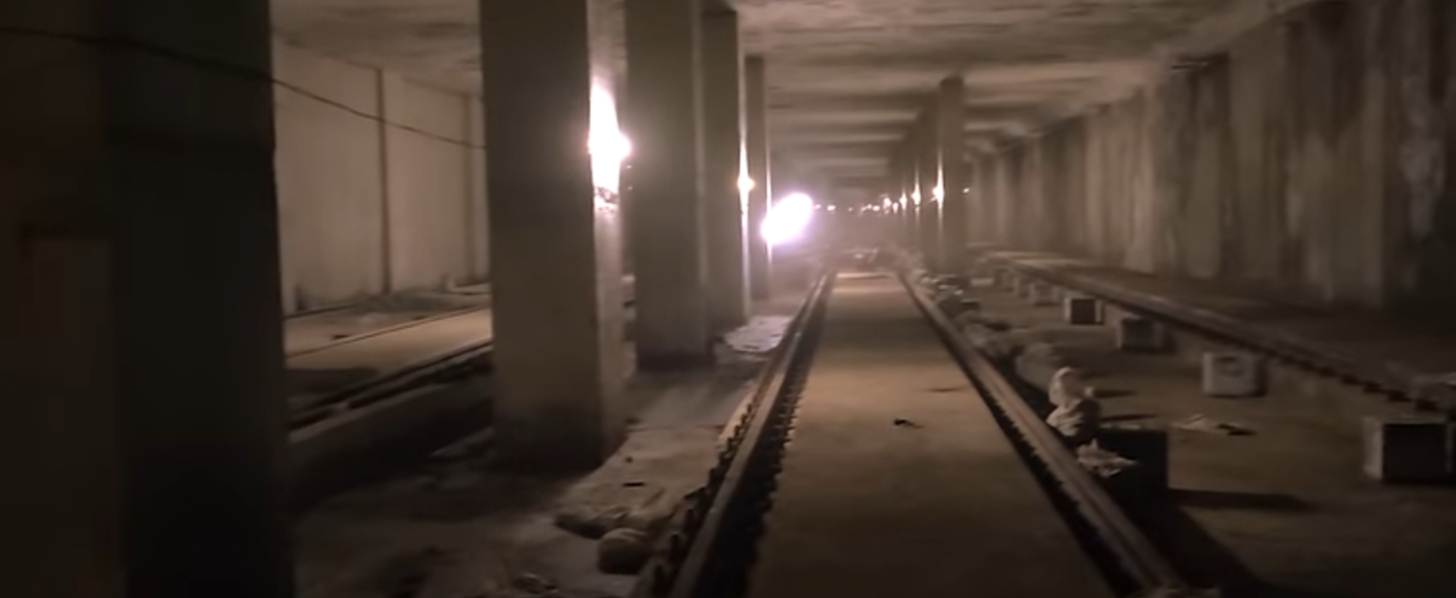
Airport metro depot

=== Delays ===
The work has been delayed for years due to multiple issues. At first AAI objected the station above the ground, stating that this could be a threat for air traffic. Many underground utilities, power sub-station and water treatment plant had to be shifted. Encroachments and Land acquisition problems held up the project for multiple times.

== Features ==
This station will also have a stabling yard, and it will be the largest underground facility of India, and city's first. It will be 550m long and 41.6m wide, and will facilitate stabling and reversal of rakes, but it will not be a carshed. Previously the station was planned elevated, but after objection from AAI, the route was reworked and the station was planned underground from Airport to New Barrackpore.

== Facilities ==
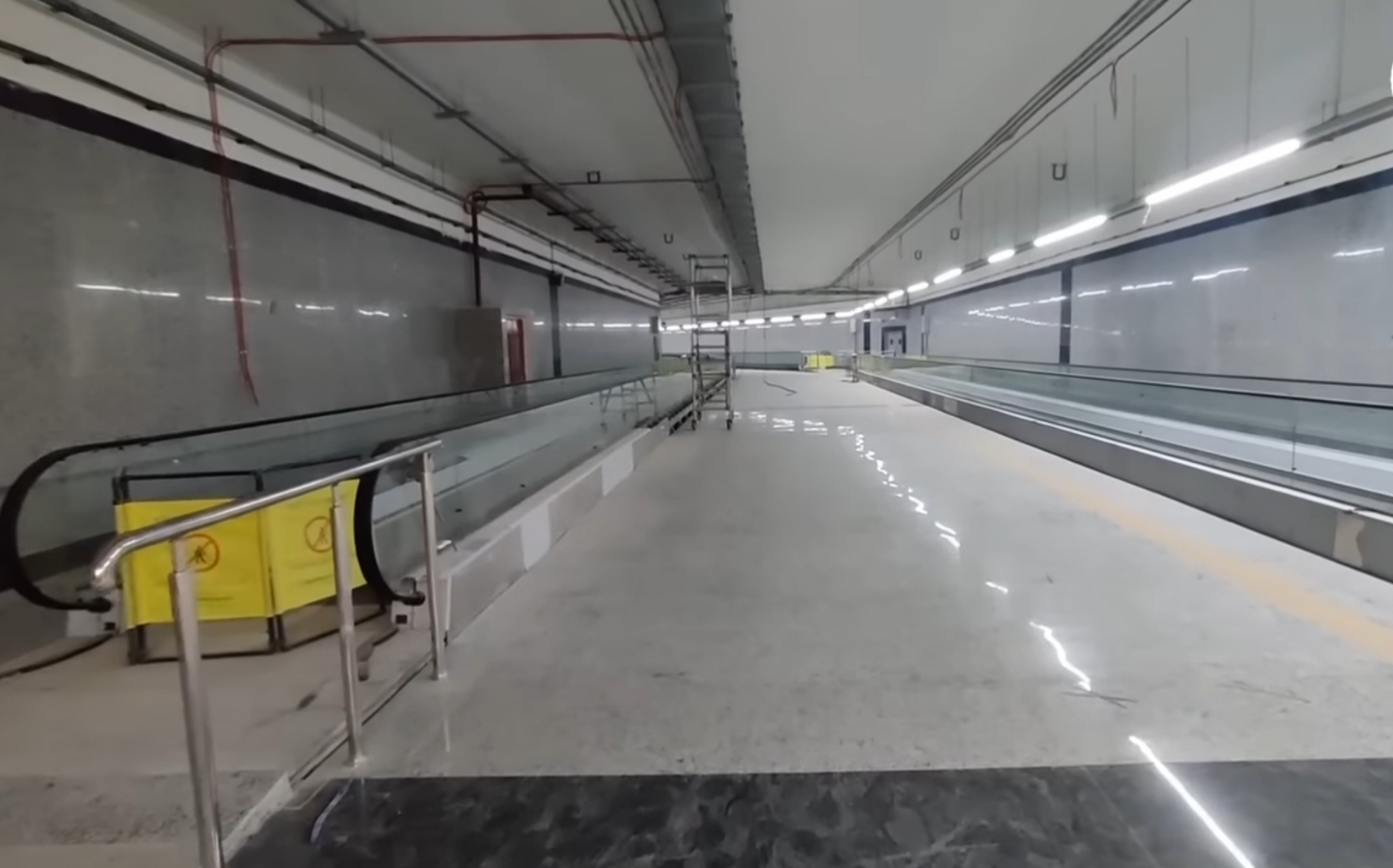
Jai Hind metro station moving walkways

As of April 2019, the station is planned to be around 150 m (490 ft) away from the terminal building. It will be connected via subways which will be having moving walkways.

== Interchanges ==
Here, Yellow and Orange Lines will meet. There will be 5 tracks, two for Yellow Line, two for Orange Line, one of which is for terminating and departing both Noapara and Barasat bound trains and one for the yard.

== Station Layout ==
G	Street level	Exit/Entrance
L1	Concourse	Fare control, station agent, Ticket/token, shops
L2	Side platform, Doors will open on the left
L2	Platform 1	Alighting only →
L2	Platform 2	← Train towards Noapara (Jessore Road)
L2	Island platform, Doors will open on both sides
L2	Platform 3	Alighting only →
L2	Platform 4	← Train towards Kavi Subhash (VIP Road)
L2	Side platform, Doors will open on the left
L2	Platform 5	For emergency use

== Entry/Exits ==
- 1 – For Airport Terminal 1& 2 Building, Airport Bus Stand
- 2 – Airport Taxi Stand
- 3 – Metro Railway Office, Old Bimanbandar Railway Station
- 4 – Airport Police Station
- 5 – Airport Gate 2½, Near Jessore Road
- 6 & 7 – Planned
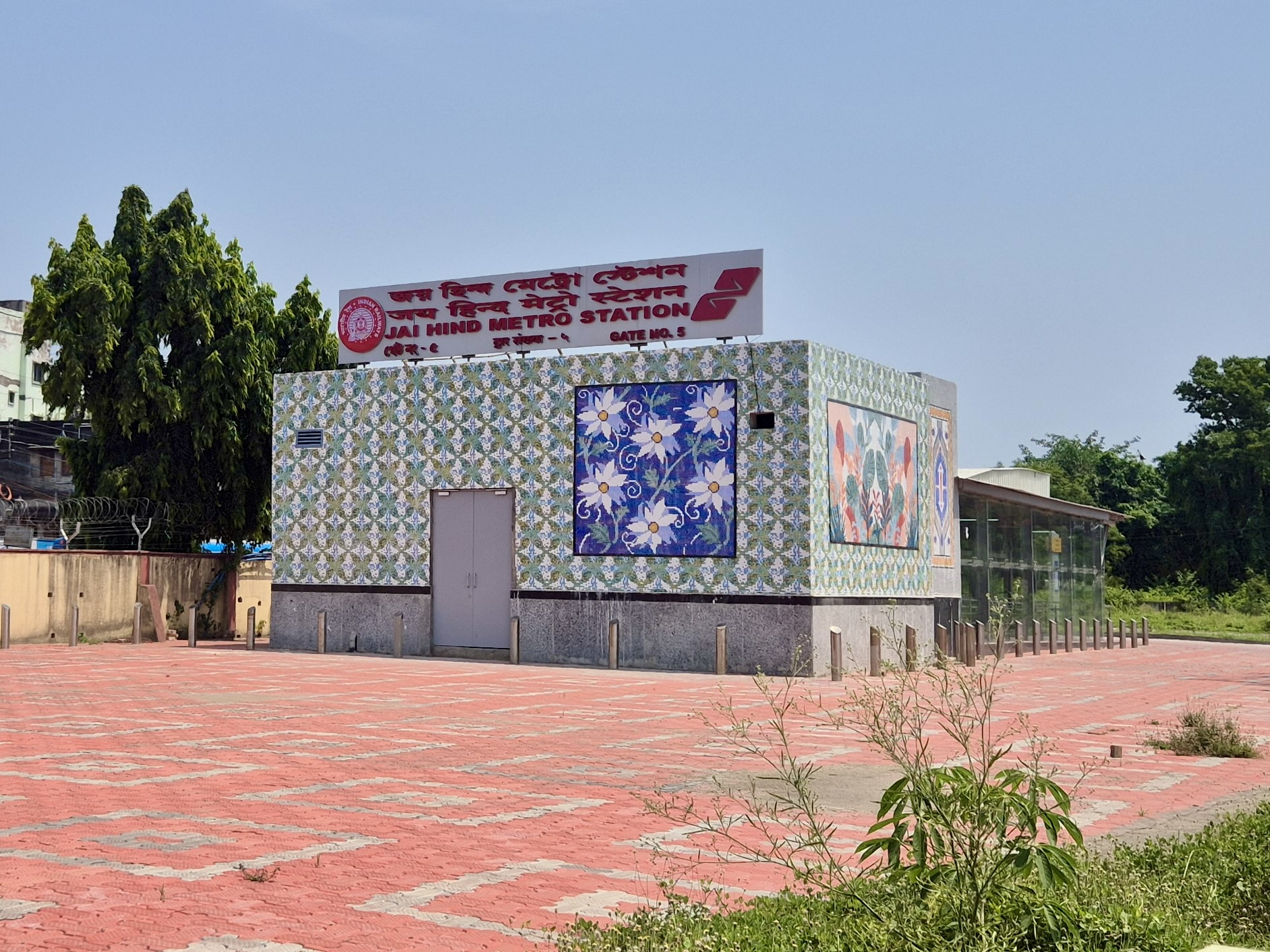
Jai Hind metro station Gate no. 5

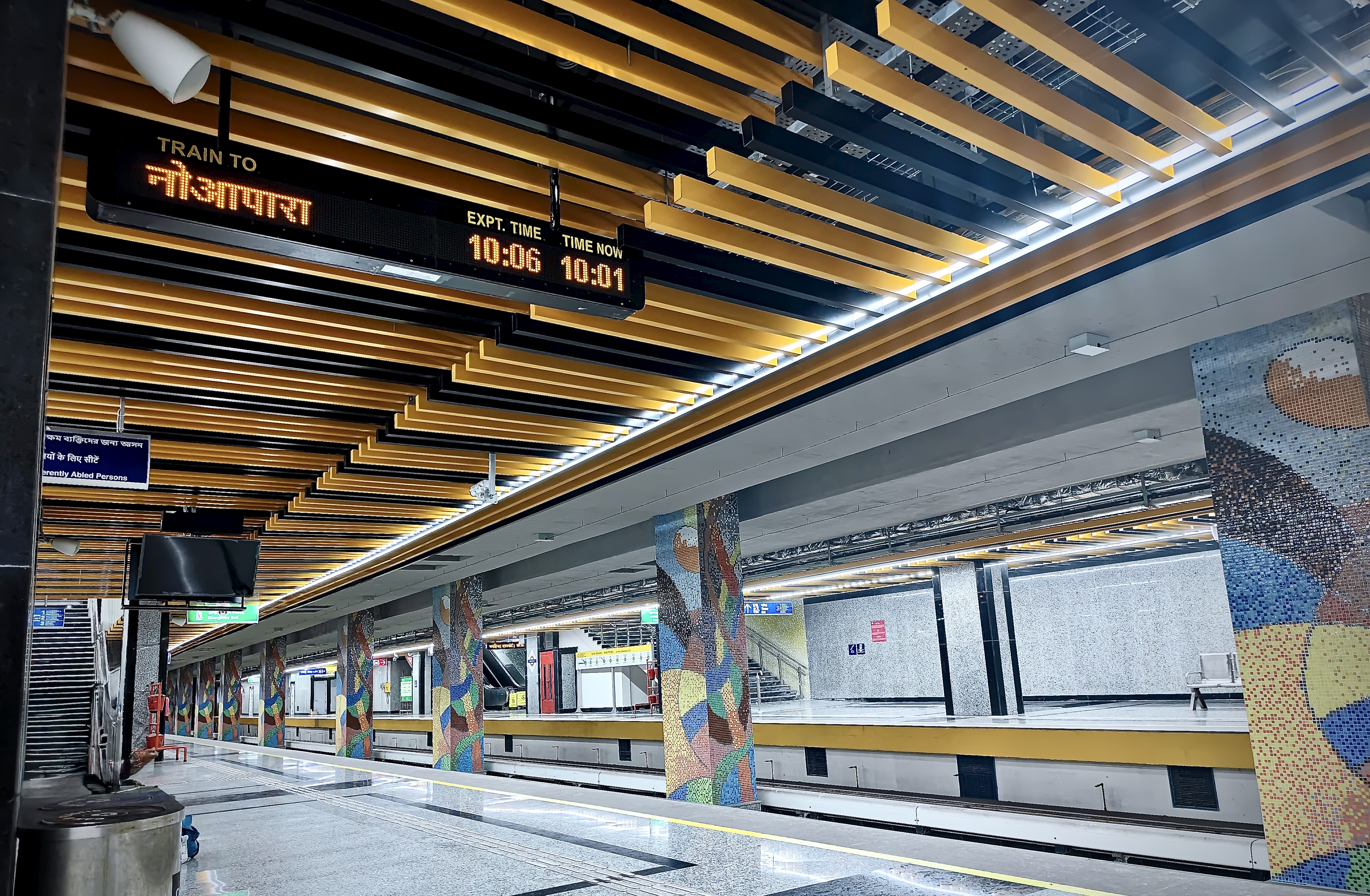
Noapara bound Yellow line platform no. 2

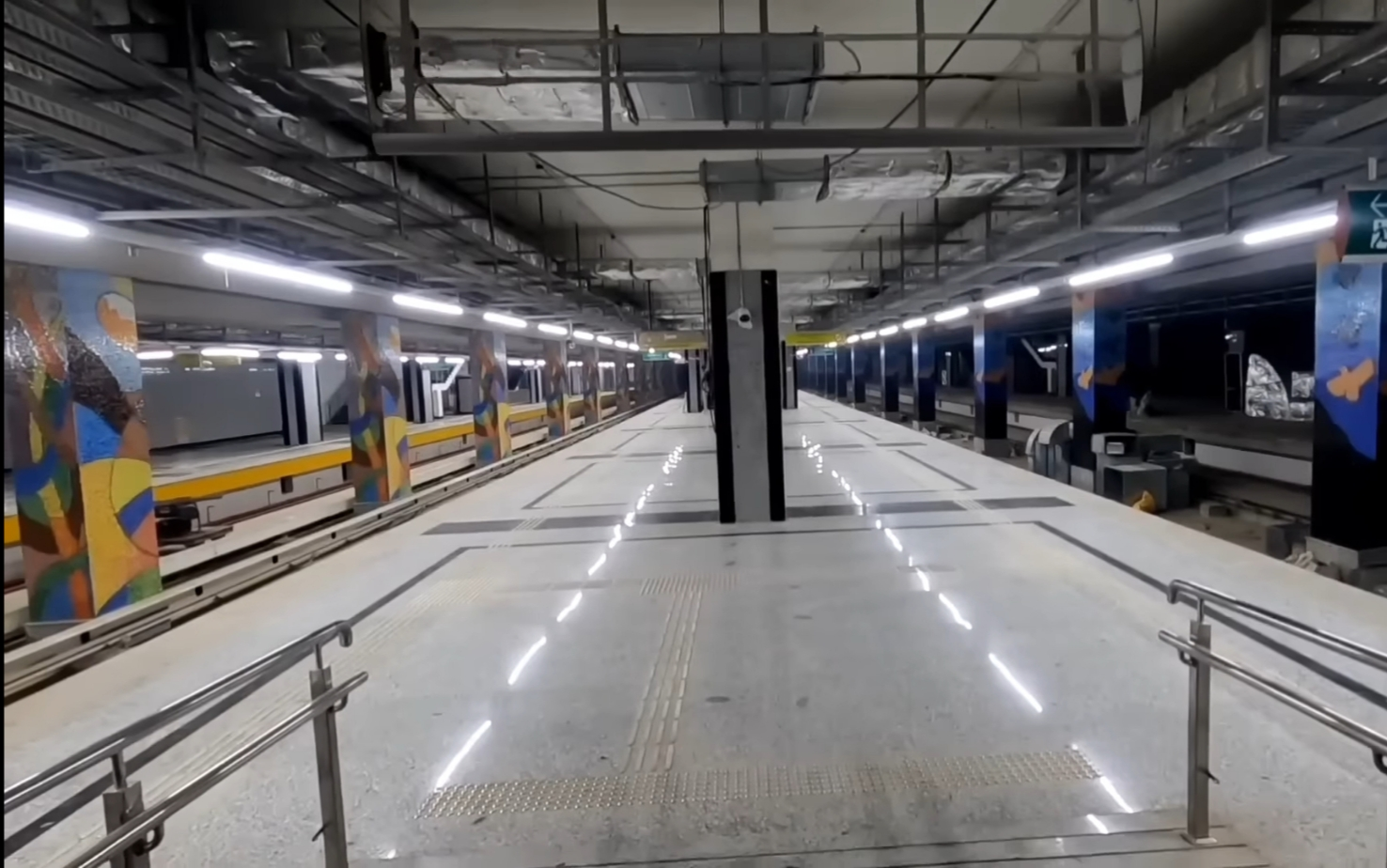
Jai Hind metro station platforms

== Connections ==
=== Road ===
A large number of buses ply via Jessore Rd and VIP Road are as follows:

- AC 39 (Airport Terminal - Howrah Stn.)
- VS 2 (Airport Terminal - Howrah Stn.)
- V1 (Airport Terminal - Tollygunge)
- VS 1 (Airport Terminal - Esplanade)
- AC 37C (Airport Terminal - Garia)
- AC 37A (Airport Terminal - Garia)
- AC 43 (Airport Terminal - Golf Green)
- AC 38 (Dum Dum 11A - Karunamoyee)
- S10 (Airport Gate no 3 - Nabanna)
- D-10 (Barasat - Amtala)
- AC 37 (Barasat - Garia)
- EB-12 (Barasat - Karunamoyee)
- ACT-4 (Barasat - Karunamoyee)
- ACT-23 (Park Circus - Dankuni)
- AC 23A (Rajchandrapur - Karunamoyee)
- AC 50A (Rajchandrapur - Garia)
- S23A (Rajchandrapur - Karunamoyee)
- AC 2 (Barasat - Howrah Stn)
- S 64 (Naihati - Newtown)
- S 66 (Choto Finga - Howrah Stn)
- D-1A (Airport - Tollygunge)
- 30B (Gouripur - Babughat)
- 223 (B.T College - Golf Green)
- 237 (Birati - Babughat)
- 45 (Airport - Garia Stn.)
- 45A (Airport - Garia Stn.)
- 46 (Airport - Esplanade)
- L238 (Barasat - Howrah Stn.)
- 79B (Barasat - Bagbazar)
- DN-8 (Barasat - Salt Lake Sector V)
- 93 (Kharibari - Bagbazar)
- 79D (Madhyamgram - Babughat)
- S-151 Mini (Airport - B.B.D Bag)
- S-184 Mini (Birati - B.B.D Bag)
- S-175 Mini (New Barrackpore - Howrah Stn.)
- AC 40 (Airport - Howrah Maidan)
- C-42 (Barasat - Howrah)
- C-23 (Dankuni - Park Circus)
- DN-47 (Barasat - Karunamoyee)
- DN-18 (Baduria - Shyambazar)
- 91 (Bhangar - Shyambazar)
- 91A (Harao Banstala - Shyambazar)
- Barasat - Botanical Garden Bus
- Barasat - Baruipur Bus
- Rajchandrapur - Karunamoyee Bus
- Airport 1 no. Gate - Amta Bus etc.

=== Rail ===
Previously Eastern Railway operated Suburban Railway services (Kolkata Circular Railway) up to here. Currently the nearest stations are Dum Dum Cantonment railway station and Durganagar railway station.

=== Air ===
The station itself serves the Netaji Subhash Chandra Bose International Airport.

== See also ==
- List of Kolkata Metro stations
