= Dum Dum Assembly constituency =

Dum Dum
- Constituency No. 114 for the West Bengal Legislative Assembly
- Interactive Map Outlining Dum Dum Assembly Constituency

Constituency details
- Country: India
- Region: East India
- State: West Bengal
- District: North 24 Parganas
- Lok Sabha constituency: Dum Dum
- Established: 1951
- Total electors: 232,545
- Reservation: None

Member of Legislative Assembly
- 18th West Bengal Legislative Assembly
- Incumbent Arijit Bakshi
- Party: BJP
- Alliance: NDA
- Elected year: 2026

Dum Dum Assembly constituency is a Legislative Assembly constituency of North 24 Parganas district in the Indian state of West Bengal.

Most Successful parties from Dumdum assembly
1. Communist Party of India (Marxist) (9 times) (50.0%)
2. All India Trinamool Congress (4 time) (22.2%)
3. Indian National Congress (2 times) (11.1%)
4. Communist Party of India (1 time) (5.55%)
5. Praja Socialist Party (1 time) (5.55%)
6. Bharatiya Janata Party (1 time) (5.55%)

== Overview ==
As per orders of the Delimitation Commission, No. 114 Dum Dum Assembly constituency is composed of the following: Dum Dum Municipality and Ward Nos.1-17 of South Dum Dum Municipality.

Dum Dum Assembly constituency is part of No. 16 Dum Dum Lok Sabha constituency.

== Members of the Legislative Assembly ==
Year	Name	Party
1951	Kanai Lal Das	Indian National Congress
1957	Pabitra Mohan Roy	Praja Socialist Party
1962	Tarun Kumar Sengupta	Communist Party of India
1967	Tarun Kumar Sengupta	Communist Party of India (Marxist)
1969	Tarun Kumar Sengupta	Communist Party of India (Marxist)
1971	Tarun Kumar Sengupta	Communist Party of India (Marxist)
1972	Lal Bahadur Singh	Indian National Congress
1977	Santi Ranjan Ghatak	Communist Party of India (Marxist)
1982	Santi Ranjan Ghatak	Communist Party of India (Marxist)
1987	Santi Ranjan Ghatak	Communist Party of India (Marxist)
1991	Sankar Sen	Communist Party of India (Marxist)
1996	Sankar Sen	Communist Party of India (Marxist)
2001	Arunava Ghosh	Trinamool Congress
2006	Rekha Goswami	Communist Party of India (Marxist)
2011	Bratya Basu	Trinamool Congress
2016	Bratya Basu	Trinamool Congress
2021	Bratya Basu	Trinamool Congress
2026	Arijit Bakshi	Bharatiya Janata Party

== Election results ==
=== 2026 ===
2026 West Bengal Legislative Assembly election: Dum Dum
Party	Candidate	Votes	%	±%
BJP	Arijit Bakshi	99,181	50.07	▲17.01
AITC	Bratya Basu	73,908	37.31	▼10.17
CPI(M)	Mayukh Biswas	20,576	10.39	▼6.15
NOTA	None of the above	1,459	0.74	▼0.36
Majority		25,273	12.76	▼1.66
Turnout		198,098	90.99	▲16.22
BJP gain from AITC		Swing		

=== 2021 ===
2021 West Bengal Legislative Assembly election: Dum Dum
Party	Candidate	Votes	%	±%
AITC	Bratya Basu	87,999	47.48	
BJP	Bimal Shankar Nanda	61,268	33.06	
CPI(M)	Palash Das	30,653	16.54	
NOTA	None of the above	2,039	1.1	
Majority		26,731	14.42	
Turnout		185,334	74.77	
AITC hold		Swing		

=== 2016 ===
2016 West Bengal Legislative Assembly election: Dum Dum
Party	Candidate	Votes	%	±%
AITC	Bratya Basu	81,579	46.73	−10.77
CPI(M)	Palash Das	72,263	41.39	+3.44
BJP	Uma Singha	14,550	8.33	+5.70
BSP	Subrata Kumar Majumdar	1,705	0.97	+0.07
Independent	Subrata Sen	959	0.54	N/A
NOTA	None of the above	3,506	2.00	N/A
Majority		9,316	5.34	−14.21
Turnout		174,562	79.06	−2.16
AITC hold		Swing		

=== 2011 ===
West Bengal assembly elections, 2011: Dum Dum constituency
Party	Candidate	Votes	%	±%
AITC	Bratya Basu	92,635	57.50	+14.72#
CPI(M)	Gautam Deb	61,138	37.95	−16.01
BJP	Anjana Chaturvedi	4,236	2.63	
PDS	Tushar Kanti Roy	1,640	1.02	
BSP	Narendranath Ghosh	1,446	0.90	
Majority		31,497	19.55	
Turnout		161,095	81.22	
AITC gain from CPI(M)		Swing		

=== 2006 ===
In the 2006 state assembly elections, Rekha Goswami of CPI(M) won from the Dum Dum assembly constituency defeating her nearest rival Udayan Namboodiry of Trinamool Congress. Contests in most years were multi cornered but only winners and runners are being mentioned. Arunava Ghosh of Trinamool Congress defeated Ajit Chowdhury of CPI(M) in 2001. Sankar Sen of CPI(M) defeated Nitai Ghosh of Congress in 1996 and Ramesh Bhattacharjee of Congress in 1991. Santi Ranjan Ghatak of CPI(M) defeated Harashit Ghosh of Congress in 1987, and Lal Bahadur Singh of Congress in 1982 and 1977.

=== 2001 ===
West Bengal assembly elections, 2001: Dum Dum constituency
Party	Candidate	Votes	%	±%
AITC	Arunava Ghosh	81,228	46.70	
CPI(M)	Ajit Choudhury	81,004	46.57	
BJP	Ramen Bhattacharya	8,564	4.92	
Independent	Mrinal Paul	1,350	0.78	
NCP	Amit Kumar Roy	1,206	0.69	
Independent	Debashis Banerjee	590	0.34	
Turnout		161,095	81.22	
AITC gain from CPI(M)		Swing		

=== 1972-1996 ===
Lal Bahadur Singh of Congress won in 1972. Tarun Kumar Sengupta of CPI(M) won in 1971, 1969 and 1967. Tarun Kumar Sengupta representing CPI won in 1962. Pabitra Mohan Roy of PSP won in 1957. In independent India's first election in 1951, kanai Lal Das of Congress won from the Dum Dum constituency.
