= List of airports in West Bengal =

Air transportation in West Bengal

This is a list of airports in West Bengal, in eastern India, grouped by type and sorted by location. It contains all public-use and military airports in the state.

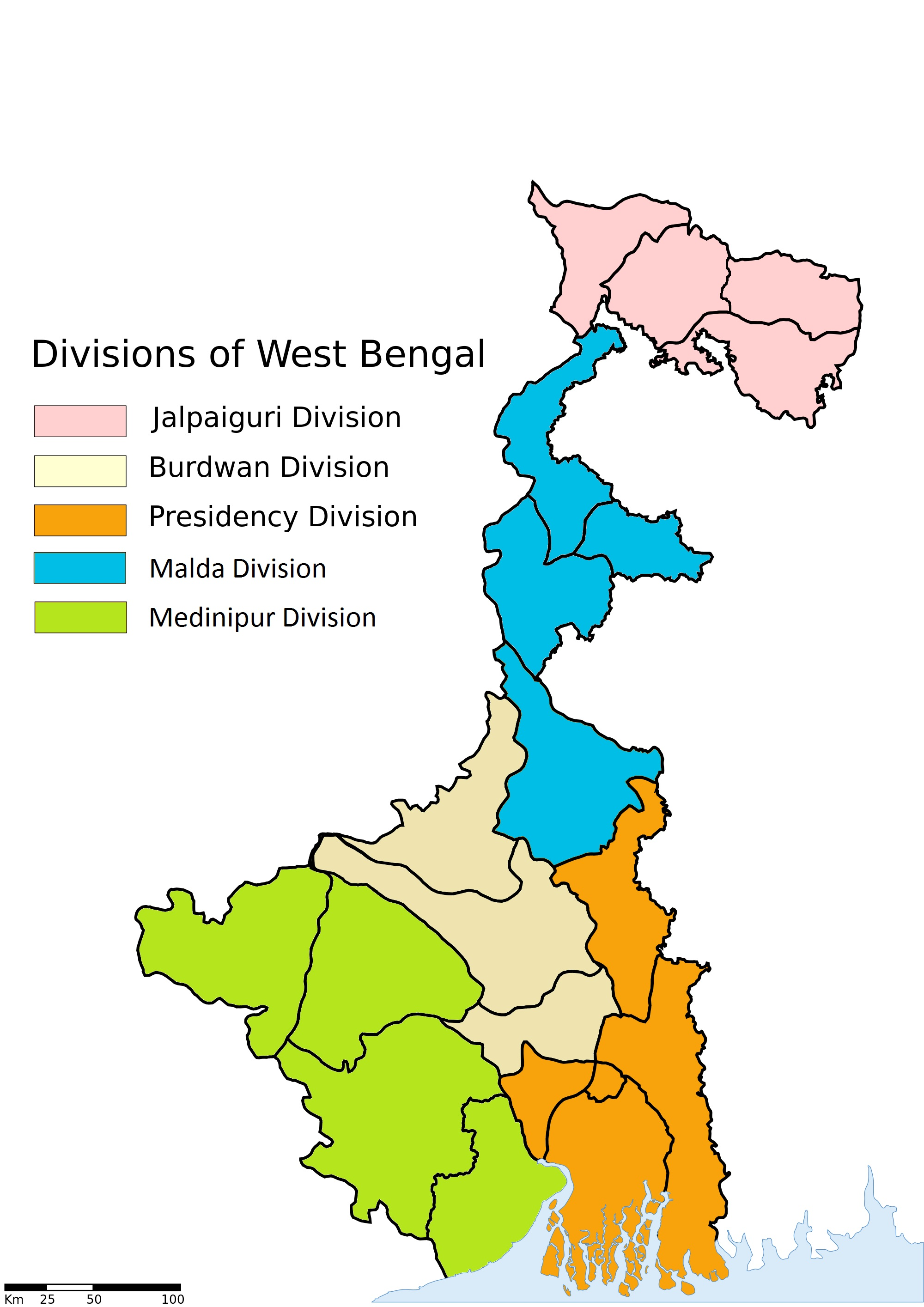
Administrative divisions of West Bengal

== Classification ==
This list contains the following information:

- **City served** - The city generally associated with the airport. This is not always the actual location since some airports are located in smaller towns outside the city they serve.
- **Division** - Location of the airport, the particular division it serves
- **ICAO** - The location indicator assigned by the International Civil Aviation Organization (ICAO)
- **IATA** - The airport code assigned by the International Air Transport Association (IATA)
- **Airport name** - The official airport name. Those shown in bold indicate the airport has scheduled service on commercial airlines.
- **Operational/ Note** - Functional status of the airport

== Airports ==
City served	Division	IATA	ICAO	Airport name	Note
International airports
Kolkata	Presidency	CCU	VECC	Netaji Subhas Chandra Bose International Airport	**International connections** to China, United Arab Emirates, Qatar, Thailand, Saudi Arabia, Sri Lanka, Indonesia, Singapore, Cambodia, Vietnam, Hong Kong, Malaysia, Myanmar, Bangladesh, Bhutan, Nepal and domestic flights to all Indian cities
Siliguri	Jalpaiguri	IXB	VEBD	Bagdogra International Airport	International flights to Singapore, Bhutan, Sri Lanka and Thailand, and domestic flights to multiple Indian cities
Kalyani	Presidency	—	—	Kolkata Kalyani Airport	Under construction
Domestic airports
Durgapur	Burdwan	RDP	VEDG	Kazi Nazrul Islam Airport	Domestic airport. Commercial flights to Kolkata, Delhi, Mumbai, Chennai, Bengaluru, Hyderabad, Bhubaneswar, Siliguri and Guwahati.
Cooch Behar	Jalpaiguri	COH	VECO	Cooch Behar Airport	Domestic airport. Commercial flight to Kolkata, Jamshedpur and Bhubaneswar.
Balurghat	Malda	RGH	VEBG	Balurghat Airport	Under construction
Kolkata	Presidency	—	VEBA	Behala Airport	Flying club, VVIP landing station
Malda	Malda	LDA	VEMH	Malda Airport	Under Construction
Purulia	Medinipur	—	—	Charra Airfield	Stated in budget.
Private airstrips
Asansol	Burdwan	—	VEBB	Burnpur Airport	Steel Authority of India Limited
Durgapur	Burdwan	—	—	Durgapur Steel Plant Airstrip	Government of West Bengal
Military airbases
Barrackpore	Presidency	—	VEBR	Barrackpore Air Force Station	Indian Air Force
Alipurduar	Jalpaiguri	—	VEHX	Hasimara Air Force Station	Indian Air Force
Kalaikunda	Medinipur	—	VEDX	Kalaikunda Air Force Station	Indian Air Force
Kanchrapara	Presidency	—	VBKP	Air Force Station Kanchrapara	Indian Air Force
Panagarh	Burdwan	—	VEPH	Panagarh Air Force Station	Indian Air Force
Salua	Medinipur	—	VESX	Air Force Station Salua	Indian Air Force
Rampurhat	Burdwan	—	—	Surichua Aerodrome	Indian Air Force (planned)
Closed airstrips/runways
Asansol	Burdwan	—	—	Asansol Airfield	World War II USAAF airstrip
Hijli	Presidency	—	—	Hijli Airfield	World War II USAAF airstrip
Bishnupur	Medinipur	—	—	Piardoba Airfield	World War II USAAF airstrip
Bagrakote	Jalpaiguri	—	—	Leesh River Airstrip	World War II USAAF airstrip
Dhubulia	Presidency	—	—	Dhubulia Airstrip	No. 99 Squadron RAF during World War II
Garhbeta	Medinipur	—	—	Digri Airfield	World War II RAF 159 Squadron
Guskara	Burdwan	—	—	Guskhara Airfield	World War II USAAF airstrip
Jhargram	Medinipur	—	—	Dudhkundi Airfield	World War II USAAF 444th Bombardment Group
Kalyani	Presidency	—	—	Kalyani Airfield	World War II USAAF airstrip
Pandaveswar	Burdwan	—	—	Pandaveswar Airfield	World War II USAAF airstrip
Salboni	Medinipur	—	—	Salboni Airfield	World War II USAAF airstrip

== Gallery ==
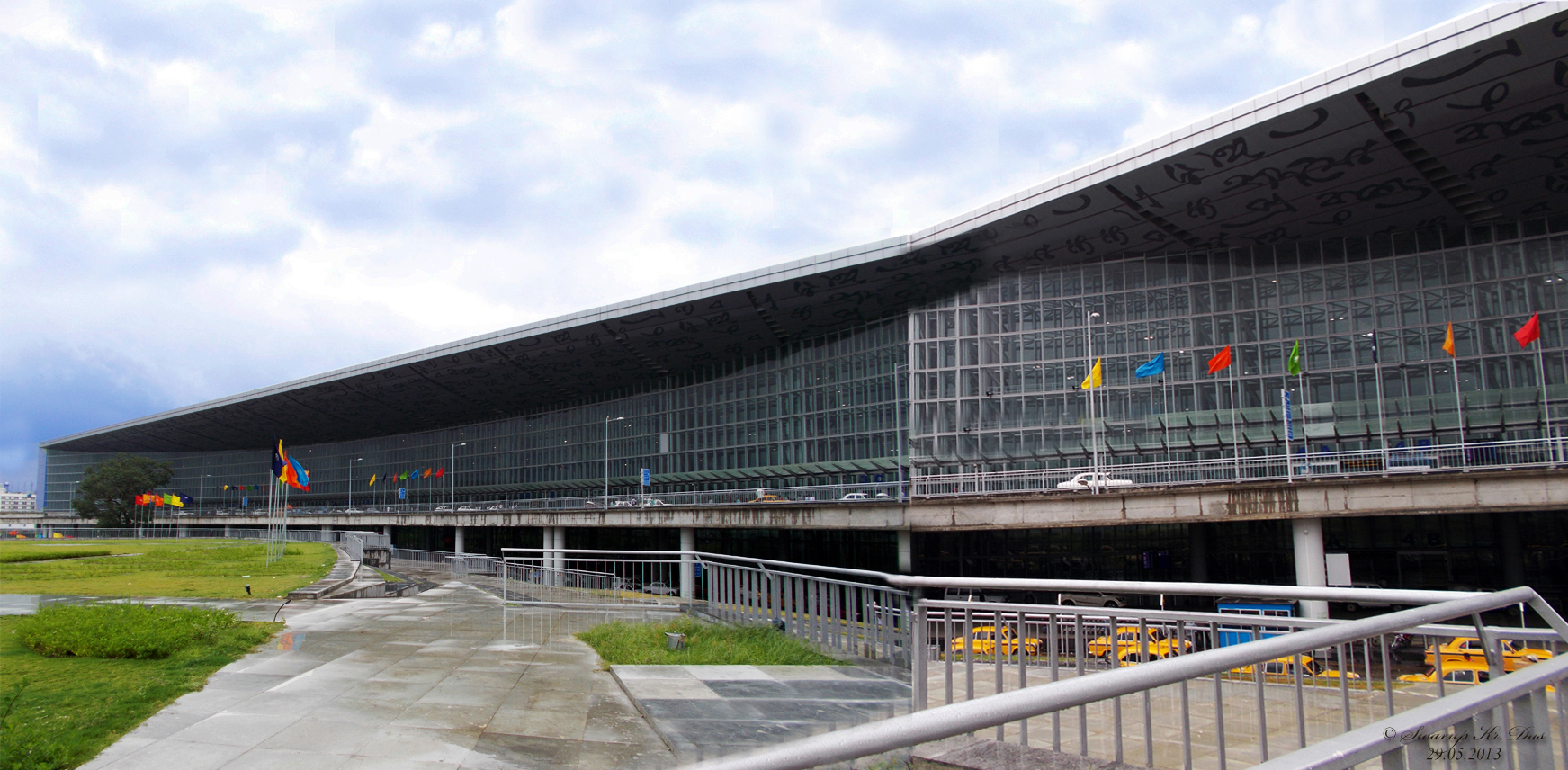
Netaji Subhas Chandra Bose International Airport

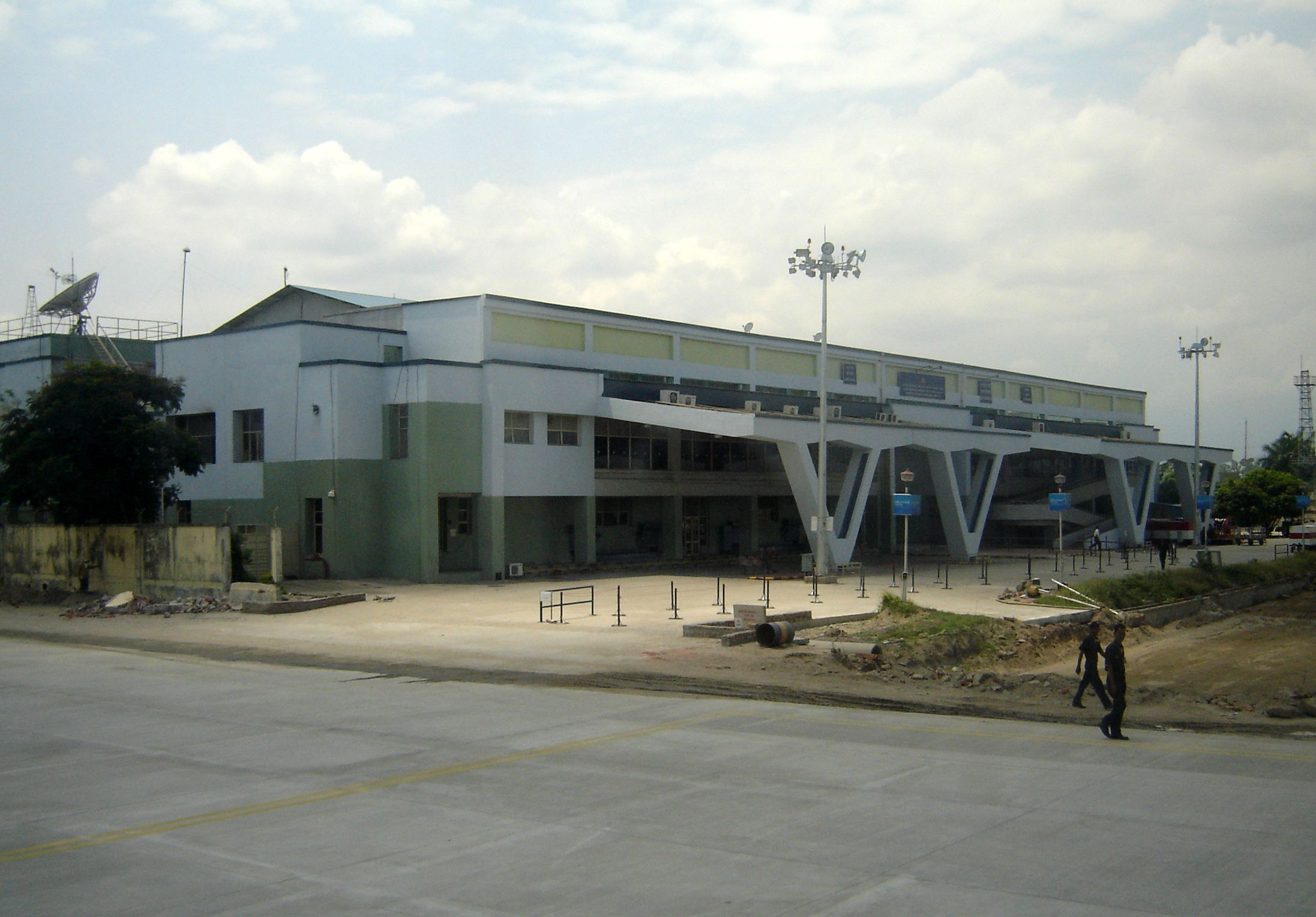
Bagdogra International Airport

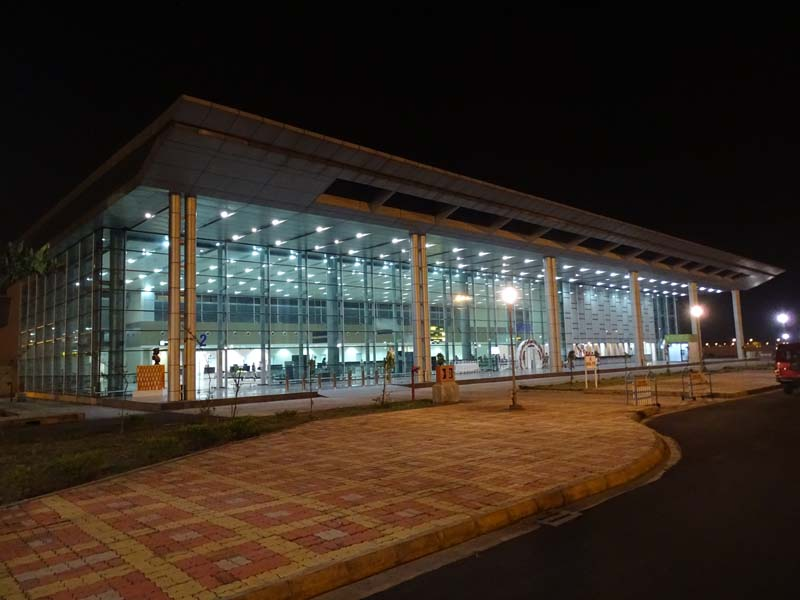
Kazi Nazrul Islam Airport

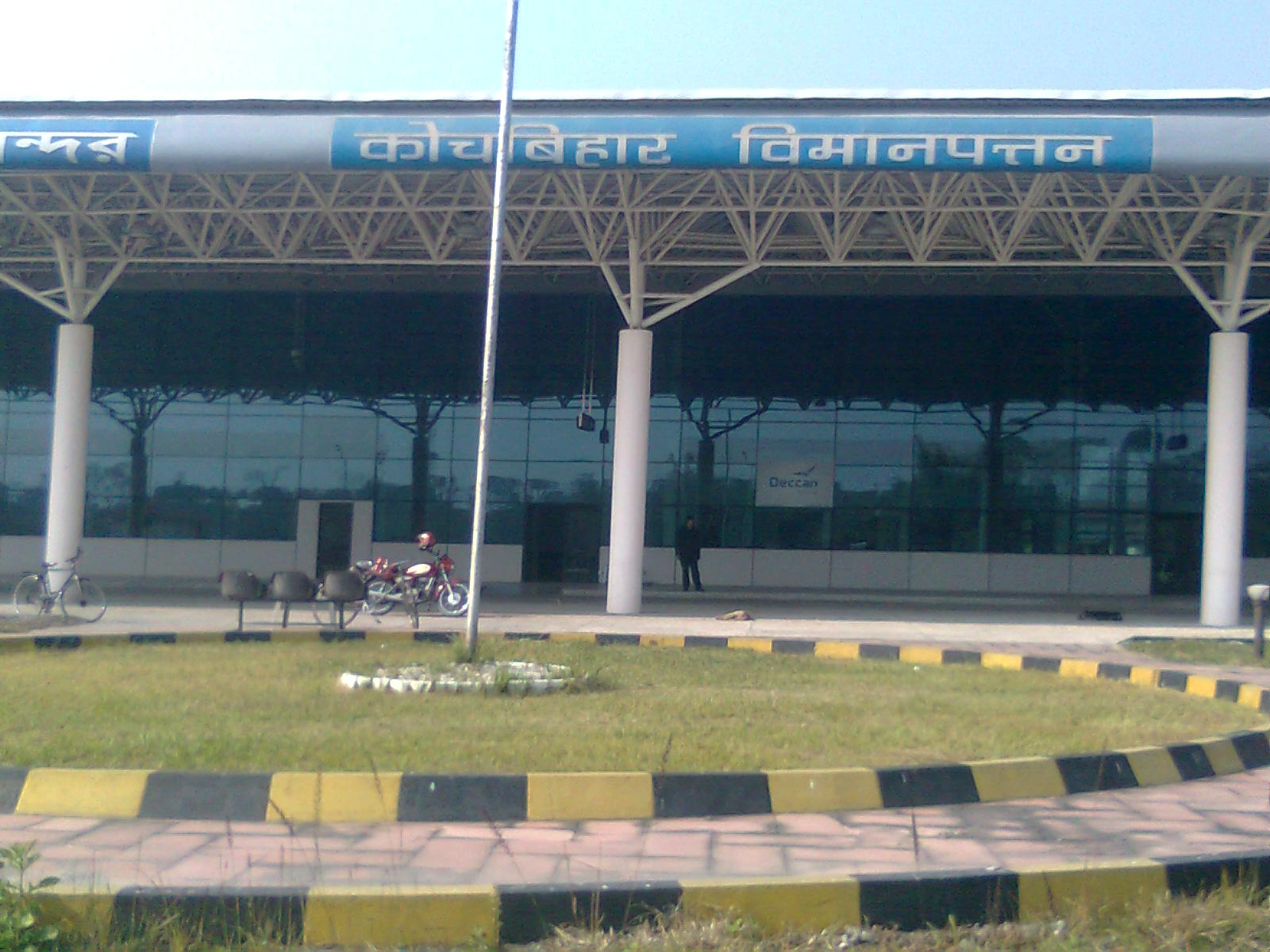
Cooch Behar Airport

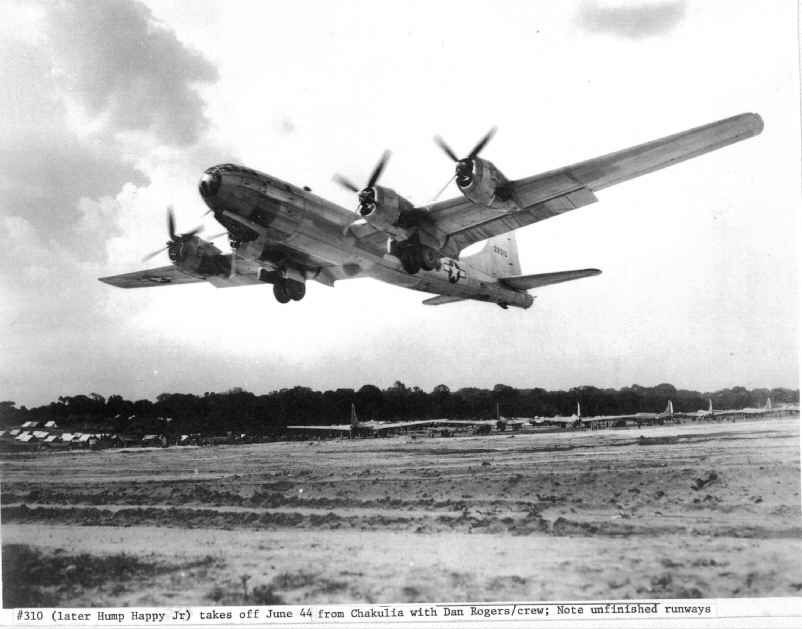
Chakulia Airport in June, 1944

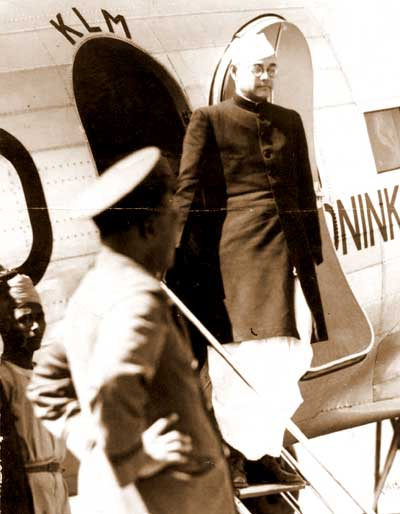
Subhas Chandra Bose arriving at Kolkata Airport

== See also ==
- List of airports by ICAO code: V#VA VE VI VO - India
- List of airports in India
- List of Indian Air Force bases
- Wikipedia:WikiProject Aviation/Airline destination lists: Asia#India
