= Kolkata Kalyani Airport =

Proposed airport in Kolkata

- IATA: none; ICAO: none

Summary
- Airport type: Public
- Owner/Operator: Airports Authority of India
- Serves: Kolkata Metropolitan Region
- Location: Kalyani, Kolkata metropolitan area, West Bengal, India
- Time zone: IST (UTC+05:30)
- Coordinates: 22°39′17″N 088°26′48″E

Map
- Location within West Bengal

Kolkata Kalyani Airport is a proposed greenfield airport for the Kolkata metropolitan area in the Indian state of West Bengal. It is planned to be built near the city of Kalyani in Nadia district, and will serve as a secondary airport alongside the existing Netaji Subhas Chandra Bose International Airport.

In June 2026, the Government of West Bengal announced the project, and the site selection process began. As per the plan, the airport will be built on approximately 2,000 acres of land.

== Background and planning ==
When the proposal to use Kazi Nazrul Islam Airport (Andal Airport) as a second airport to relieve the passenger pressure at Kolkata Airport was announced, it was rejected by the government of India, stating that it is located about 190 km from the city. In 2022, the West Bengal government identified Bhangar-2 block in South 24 Parganas as the site for setting up Kolkata's second airport; but the plan was ultimately scrapped.

In June 2026, the government of West Bengal announced the construction of an airport near Kalyani by Finance Minister Swapan Dasgupta in his first budget speech. In September 2026, the government restricted on transaction of properties in nine mouzas in the Nadia district. The restriction was notified by the Directorate of Registration and Stamp Revenue. The government already owns around 240 acres of land, including a 172 acre brick field.

== Connectivity ==
The site chosen for the proposed airport is close to the Kalyani Expressway and National Highway 12. There are also plans to connect the airport with the Kolkata metro.

== See also ==
- Airports in India
