= Andal Aerotropolis =

Sujalaam Skycity
- Aerotropolis
- Sujalaam Skycity
- Logo of Sujalaam Sky city, Durgapur

- Location within West Bengal Location within India
- Coordinates: 23°37′16″N 87°14′36″E
- Country: India
- State: West Bengal
- District: Paschim Bardhaman district
- Subdivision: Durgapur
- Community Development Block: Andal
- Established: 2011
- Named for: Sujalaam, which means "rich with water bodies" in Sanskrit

Area
  - Total: 8.004682 km^{2} (3.090625 sq mi)
- Demonym: Skycityizen
- Website: www.bengalaero.com/Home/Sujalaam

Sujalaam Skycity, popularly known as Durgapur Aerotropolis is India's first aerotropolis, located at Andal, in the industrial city of Durgapur in the Paschim Bardhaman district of West Bengal. It is also the first greenfield aerotropolis, developed around the Kazi Nazrul Islam Airport. It has been developed in association with Singapore's Changi Airports International (CAI) and constructed by Bengal Aerotropolis Projects Limited (BAPL). The airport city is constructed around an old airfield RIAF Station Andal and used by the RAF in Andal, and also by the USAAF during World War II.

== Formation ==
Andal Aerotropolis

On 7 September 2007, the Union Civil Aviation Ministry and the West Bengal government announced plans to set up a new airport – along with a township, IT and logistics hub – at Durgapur. Marking the start of the Aerotropolis Project in Andal, the Andal Aerotropolis Project is spread over approximately 2,182 acres (8.83 km^{2}) in the Asansol Durgapur Planning Area (ADPA) of Paschim Bardhaman district in West Bengal. Bestowed with premium facilities and unparalleled opportunities in the fields of power-intensive industries, mining, iron and steel, metalwork, engineering, petrochemicals, Information Technology (IT) and telecommunications, ADPA had proved to be an ideal destination for investors. BAPL completed most of its legal procedures, receiving the In-Principal Clearance from the Ministry of Civil Aviation as well as getting the Land Use Development Control Plan (LUDCP) approved by Asansol Durgapur Development Authority (ADDA). It entered into a Technical Services Agreement with Changi Airports India Pte Ltd, Singapore. In Paschim Bardhaman district both Asansol and Durgapur have airstrips for the landing of small planes at Burnpur and Bijra respectively. Also, there is a military airfield at Panagarh in Durgapur subdivision is under Indian Air Force.

== The city ==
Andal Aerotropolis has 493 acre of integrated Township, 472 acres of IT Park, logistics hub and industrial area and 258 acres of institutional area. Narayana Schools have an operating school on the premises. Moreover, a logistics hub of Spectrum Logistics has been set up and is operational (used by Asian Paints). Another company Ardex Endura, which is a ceramic factory, have their operations in the aerotropolis. Keventer Agro has one of its operational unit in the Sujalaam Skycity. Fortune group of hotels has announced its intention to start a four-star hotel like the one in City Centre. Mission hospital is also set to construct its unit there. Lemon tree Hotels have agreed to set up an 80 roomed mid priced luxury hotel in the Sujalaam Skycity.

== See also ==
- West Bengal
- List of airports in West Bengal
