= Zooom Air =

Indian commercial airline (2017–2024)

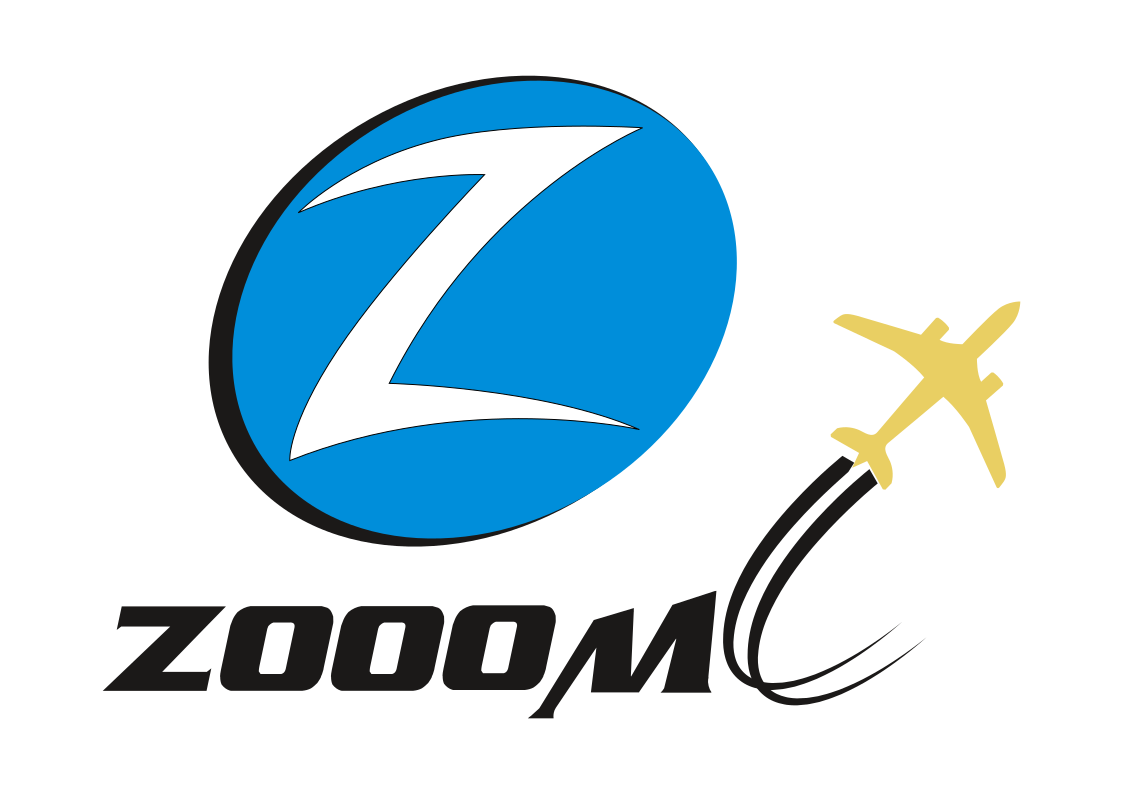
| IATA | ICAO | Call sign |
|---|---|---|
| ZO | ZOM | ZOOM |
- Founded: April 2013; 13 years ago (as Zexus Air)
- Commenced operations: 15 February 2017; 9 years ago
- Ceased operations: 29 June 2024; 2 years ago
- Operating bases: Indira Gandhi International Airport (Delhi)
- Fleet size: 5
- Destinations: 1
- Parent company: Zexus Air Services
- Headquarters: Gurugram, Haryana, India
- Key people: Atul Gambhir, CEO
- Employees: 125
- Website: www.zooom.aero

Zexus Air Services, doing business as Zooom Air, was an Indian low-cost regional airline headquartered in Gurugram, Haryana, India. It operated from its base at Indira Gandhi International Airport in Delhi, with a fleet of 5 aircraft.

== History ==
Zooom Air was established in April 2013 as "Zexus Air" by Zexus Air Services Pvt. Ltd. The Ministry of Civil Aviation issued it a No Objection Certificate (NOC) along with five other airline startups in July 2014. In September 2016, the airline took delivery of its first aircraft, a Bombardier CRJ200. The airline received its air operator's certificate (AOC) on 3 February 2017, and began flight operations on 15 February from Delhi to Kolkata, with a stop at Durgapur.

=== Operational difficulties and cessation of operations ===
Although the airline initially started its operations with a considerable response under the government's UDAN Scheme, it could not last longer due to declining passengers and patronage. So, in July 2018, the operating license of the airline was suspended by the Directorate General of Civil Aviation (DGCA) due to safety concerns. The DGCA then revived the airline's AOC in December 2018, and it was expected that the airline will restart operations in January 2019. All operations were suspended until 31 October 2019, when the airline restarted operations,. However, all operations were grounded indefinitely in March 2020 due to the COVID-19 pandemic. The airline was supposed to resume operations again in January 2021, with no success. It began to be involved with insolvency over unpaid dues due to grounding, because an expatriate pilot associated with the company filed an application in the National Company Law Tribunal (NCLT) court as an operational creditor. The NCLT considered the report on 25 March 2022, along with appointing an interim resolution professional, All operational and financial creditors were asked to submit their claims before 8 April of the same year. The insolvency proceedings were completed after 180 days from the date of commencement of the proceedings, i.e., on 21 September 2022.

=== Restart ===
On 14 September 2023, the DGCA received its AOC again to restart operations normally. Hence, in December 2023, the airline announced it would start flights from the first week of January 2024 in the Delhi–Ayodhya–Lucknow–Ayodhya–Delhi route. Finally, it restarted operations on 31 January 2024, by starting direct flights from Delhi to Ayodhya, while flights to Amritsar, Chandigarh and Lucknow will be launched in the coming months. The airline again stopped accepting bookings for its Delhi-Ayodhya route and ultimately ceased operations for a second time on June 29, 2024.

== Corporate affairs ==
Zooom Air is the brand name for Zexus Air Services. The company is headquartered in Gurugram, Haryana, India, and its CEO is Atul Gambhir. The airline had been funded with ₹ 20 crore equity. As of February 2024, the airline had 125 employees.

== Destinations ==
As of February 2024, Zooom Air operates to the following destinations:

| State | City | Airport | Notes | Ref |
|---|---|---|---|---|
| Assam | Tezpur | Tezpur Airport | Terminated | |
| Assam | Jorhat | Jorhat Airport | Terminated | |
| Delhi | New Delhi | Indira Gandhi International Airport | Hub | |
| Punjab | Amritsar | Sri Guru Ram Das Ji International Airport | Terminated | |
| Punjab | Chandigarh | Chandigarh Airport | Terminated | |
| Rajasthan | Jaisalmer | Jaisalmer Airport | Terminated | |
| Uttar Pradesh | Agra | Agra Airport | Terminated | |
| Uttar Pradesh | Ayodhya | Ayodhya Airport | Terminated | |
| Uttar Pradesh | Lucknow | Chaudhary Charan Singh International Airport | Terminated | |
| West Bengal | Kolkata | Netaji Subhas Chandra Bose International Airport | Terminated | |
| West Bengal | Durgapur | Kazi Nazrul Islam Airport | Terminated | |

== Fleet ==
As of August 2025, Zooom Air operates the following aircraft:

Zooom Air fleet
| Aircraft | In service | Orders | Passengers | Notes |
|---|---|---|---|---|
| Bombardier CRJ200ER | 5 | 0 | 50 | |
| Total | 5 | 0 | | |

After the airline restarted regular operations on 31 January 2024, the CEO of the airline, Atul Gambhir, announced that the airline's existing fleet of five Bombardier CRJ200ER aircraft will fully become operational, and that the company was considering to place an order for new narrowbody as well as freighter aircraft, by choosing either Airbus or Boeing aircraft types, in the coming months. The airline aimed for a fleet of 20 aircraft in two years, in order to begin international flights.

== See also ==
- List of airlines of India
- List of airports in India
- Aviation in India
- UDAN Scheme
- National Company Law Tribunal
- Transport in India
