= Salua, Paschim Medinipur =

Salua
- Village
- Location in West Bengal, India Salua (India)
- Coordinates: 22°16′21.7″N 87°17′35.9″E
- Country: India
- State: West Bengal
- District: Paschim Medinipur
- Named for: Air Force Station, CRPF base camp, EFR headquarters, CISF training center, CIF training center

Population (2011)
  - Total: 4,430

Languages*
  - Official: Nepali, English, Bengali, Santali
- Time zone: UTC+5:30 (IST)
- Lok Sabha constituency: Medinipur
- Vidhan Sabha constituency: Kharagpur
- Website: paschimmedinipur.gov.in

Salua is a village, in Kharagpur I CD Block in Kharagpur subdivision of Paschim Medinipur district in the state of West Bengal, India.

== Geography ==
Cities and towns in the northern part of Kharagpur subdivision (including Khararagpur I & II, Debra and Pingla CD blocks) of Paschim Medinipur district
M: municipal city/ town, CT: census town, R: rural/ urban centre, H: historical/ religious centre, F: facilities
Owing to space constraints in the small map, the actual locations in a larger map may vary slightly

=== Location ===
Salua is located at 22°16′21.7″N 87°17′35.9″E.

=== Area overview ===
Kharagpur subdivision, shown partly in the map alongside, mostly has alluvial soils, except in two CD blocks in the west – Kharagpur I and Keshiary, which mostly have lateritic soils. Around 74% of the total cultivated area is cropped more than once. With a density of population of 787 per km^{2}nearly half of the district’s population resides in this subdivision. 14.33% of the population lives in urban areas and 86.67% lives in the rural areas.

Note: The map alongside presents some of the notable locations in the subdivision. All places marked in the map are linked in the larger full screen map.

== Demographics ==
As per 2011 Census of India Salua had a total population of 4,430 of which 2.463 (56%) were males and 1,967 (44%) were females. Population below 6 years was 515. The total number of literates in Salua was 3,915 (88.37% of the population over 6 years).

.* For language details see Kharagpur I#Language and religion

== Transport ==
SH 5 running from Rupnarayanpur (in Bardhaman district) to Junput (in Purba Medinipur district) passes through Salua.

== Air Force Station ==
Air Force Station Salua is a radar station of Indian Air Force. It had an air-field during World War II and was in use from 1942 to 1946.
