= Cooch Behar Airport =

Domestic airport in West Bengal, India

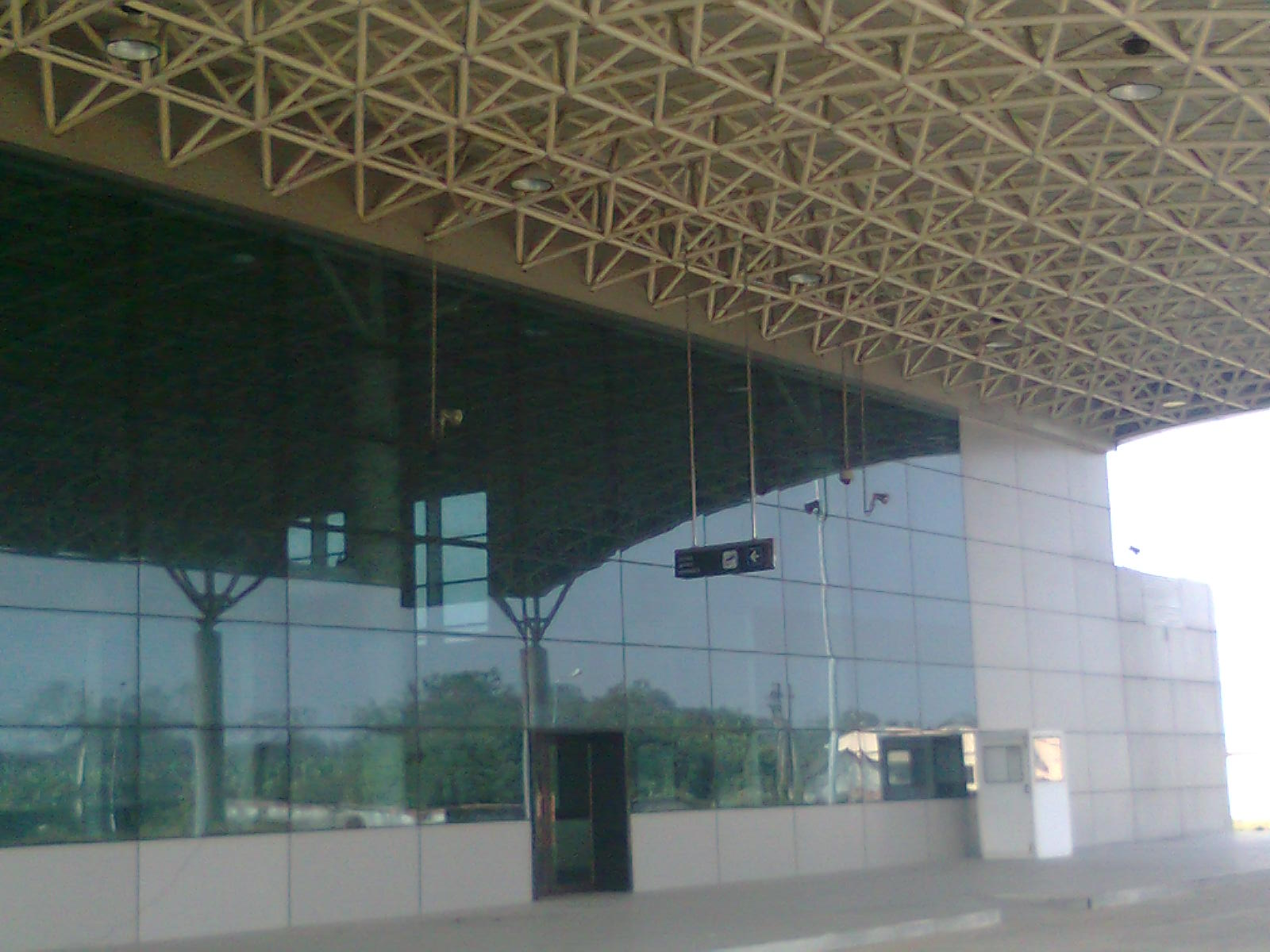
- IATA: COH; ICAO: VECO

Summary
- Airport type: Public
- Owner: Airports Authority of India
- Operator: Airports Authority of India
- Serves: Cooch Behar and Alipurduar
- Location: Cooch Behar, West Bengal, India
- Opened: 1945; 81 years ago
- Elevation AMSL: 141 ft (43 m)
- Coordinates: 26°19′50″N 089°28′02″E
- Website: Coochbehar Airport

Map
- Location of the airport in West Bengal COH (India)

Runways
Direction	Length		Surface
Direction	ft	m	Surface
04/22	3,507	1,069	Asphalt

Statistics (April 2025 – March 2026)
- Passengers: 4,297 (▼21.6%)
- Aircraft movements: 554 (▼16.6%)
- Cargo tonnage: 0 ( 0%)
- Source: AAI

Cooch Behar Airport (IATA: COH, ICAO: VECO) is a domestic airport serving the city of Cooch Behar, West Bengal, India and parts of North Bengal and Assam. It is located 6.2 km (3.9 mi) from the city centre. The airport is spread over an area of 173 acres.

== Facilities ==
The airport is located at an elevation of 141 feet (43 m) above mean sea level. It has one runway designated 04/22 with an asphalt surface, measuring 3,507 by 100 feet (1,069 by 30 m) without an instrument landing system. The airport can handle only flights using visual flight rules during the day. Improvements in radar as well as other runway systems have been completed, such as installation of lights on the runway, while the instrument landing system will be installed in the near future. There is presently a high security team residing in the airport. The airport uses a non-directional beacon for navigation services. Commercial services resumed from Cooch Behar with IndiaOne Air starting flights to Kolkata on 21 February 2023.

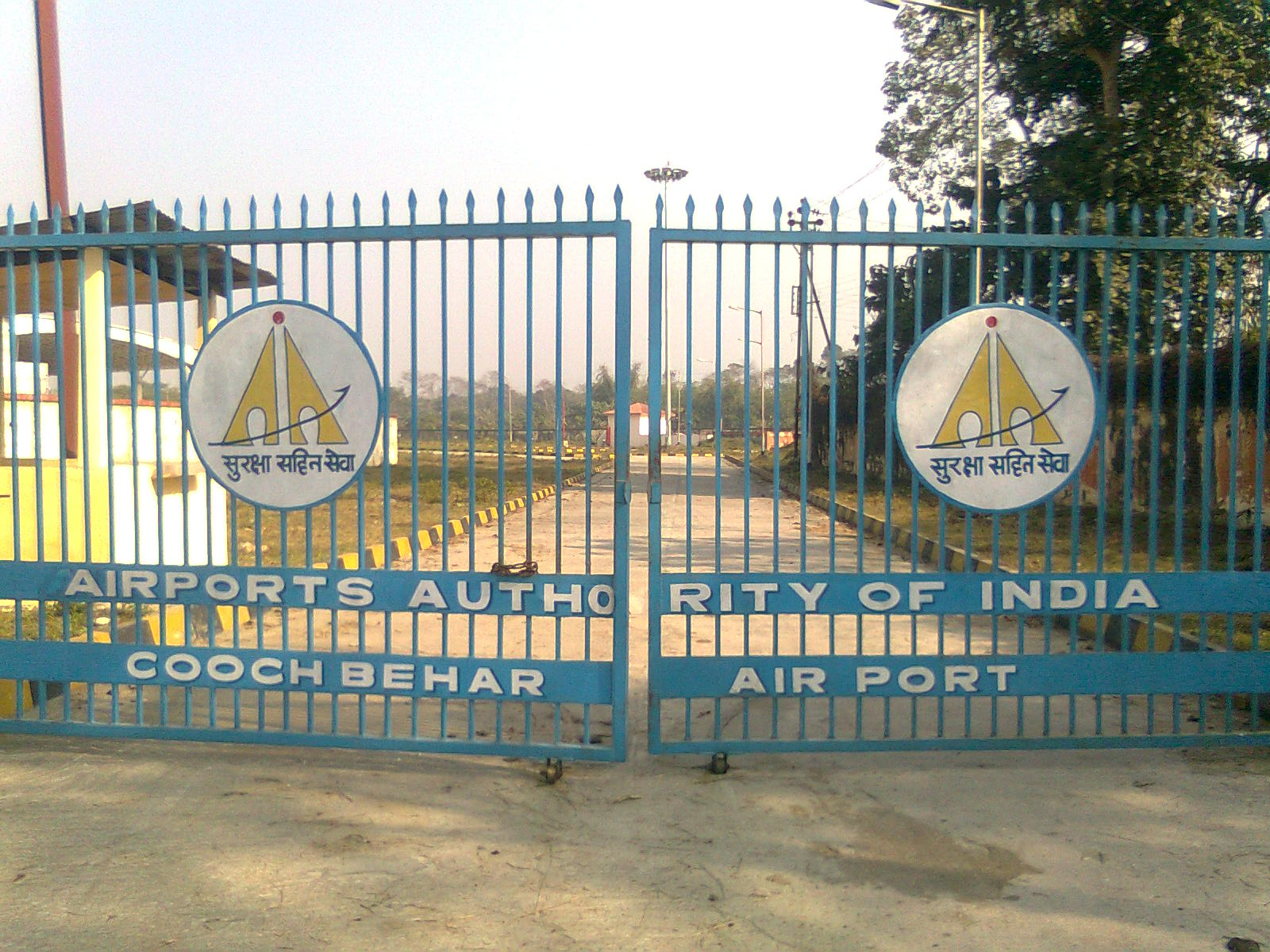
Entrance of the airport

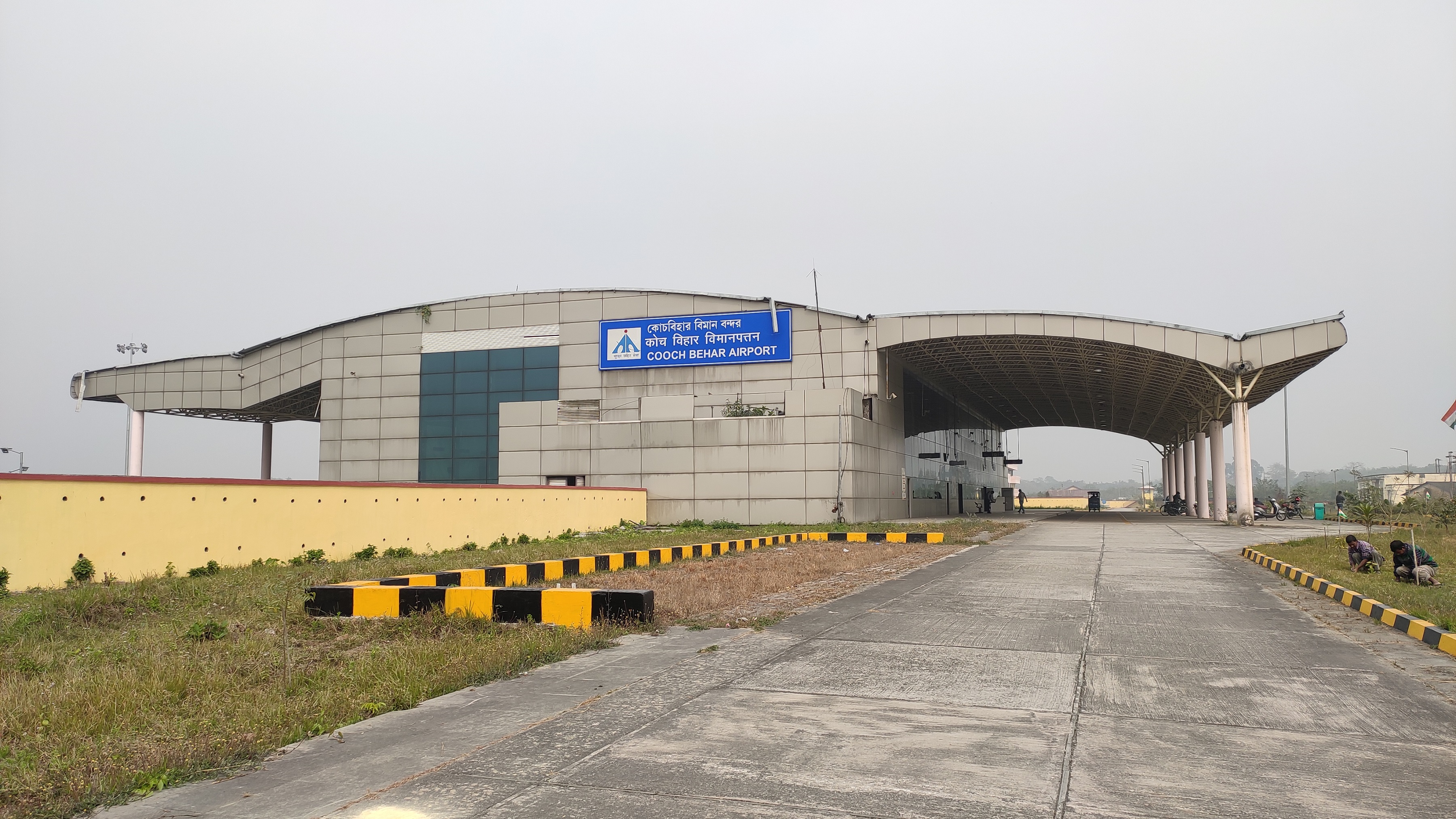
Terminal building of the airport

== Recent developments ==
In March 2020, lights were installed in the boundaries of the airport and the runway was repaired. Security was also increased in and around the premises.

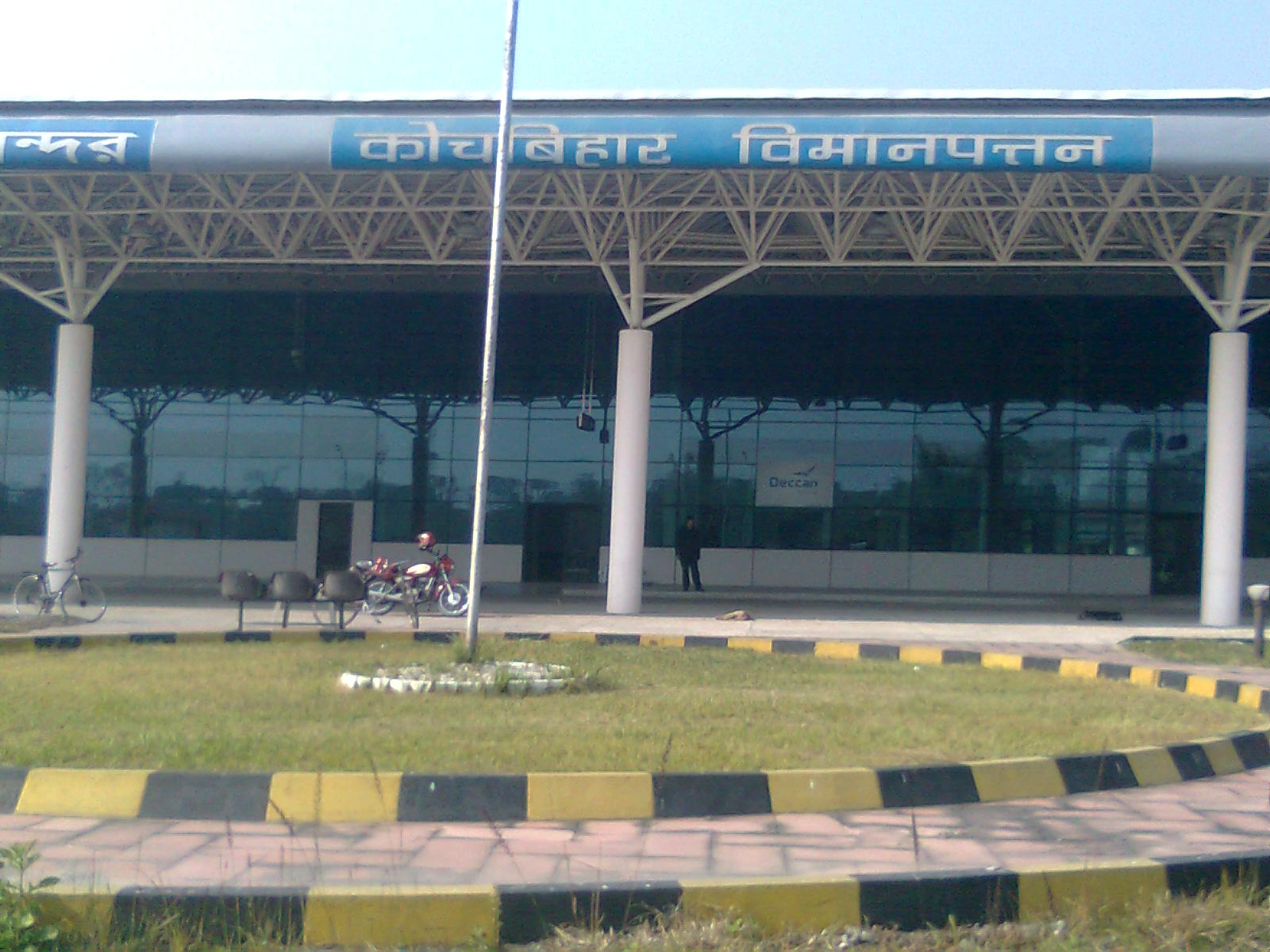
Terminal of the airport

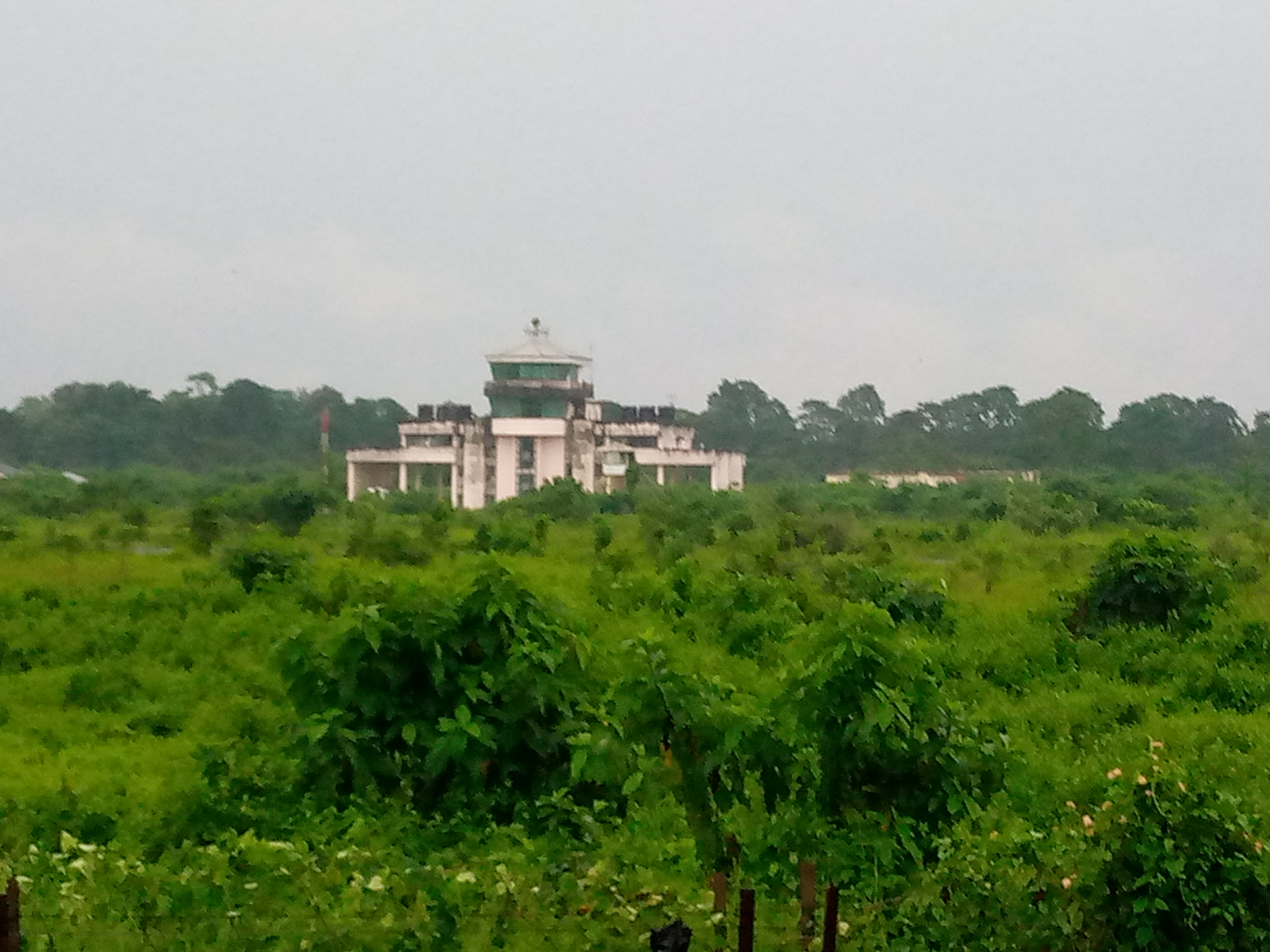
Air Traffic Control tower of the airport

While the longstanding demand of residents to resume flights from the airport in North Bengal remains unfulfilled for over 25 years, the Airports Authority of India revamped and operationalised the Rupsi Airport at Rupsi in Kokrajhar district of Assam to restart services after three decades, to handle the traffic. However, it mostly handles the traffic from Dhubri (the city it serves) and adjoining regions from Kokrajhar, Bongaigaon, etc., and does not act as a solution to Cooch Behar, because that airport is 70 km (43 mi) from it; thus it is too far to cater the traffic.

The airport's license was valid till 27 January 2021, but the Directorate General of Civil Aviation (India) decided not to renew the license until further notice. As of February 2023, it received its license again to restart commercial operations, with daily flights to Kolkata operated by the new low-cost regional airline, IndiaOne Air.

== Future expansion ==
There have been talks between the Government of West Bengal and the Airports Authority of India to expand the runway length to accommodate larger aircraft. Developments related to the airport boundary and lights were also done.

In a meeting between the Cooch Behar district administration and the Airports Authority of India in September 2023, plans were laid to operate two flights daily from the airport. A plan for a Cooch behar to Guwahati flight service was also discussed.

== See also ==
- List of airports by ICAO code
- List of airports in West Bengal
- List of airports in India
