= Netaji Subhas Chandra Bose International Airport =

Airport serving Kolkata, West Bengal, India

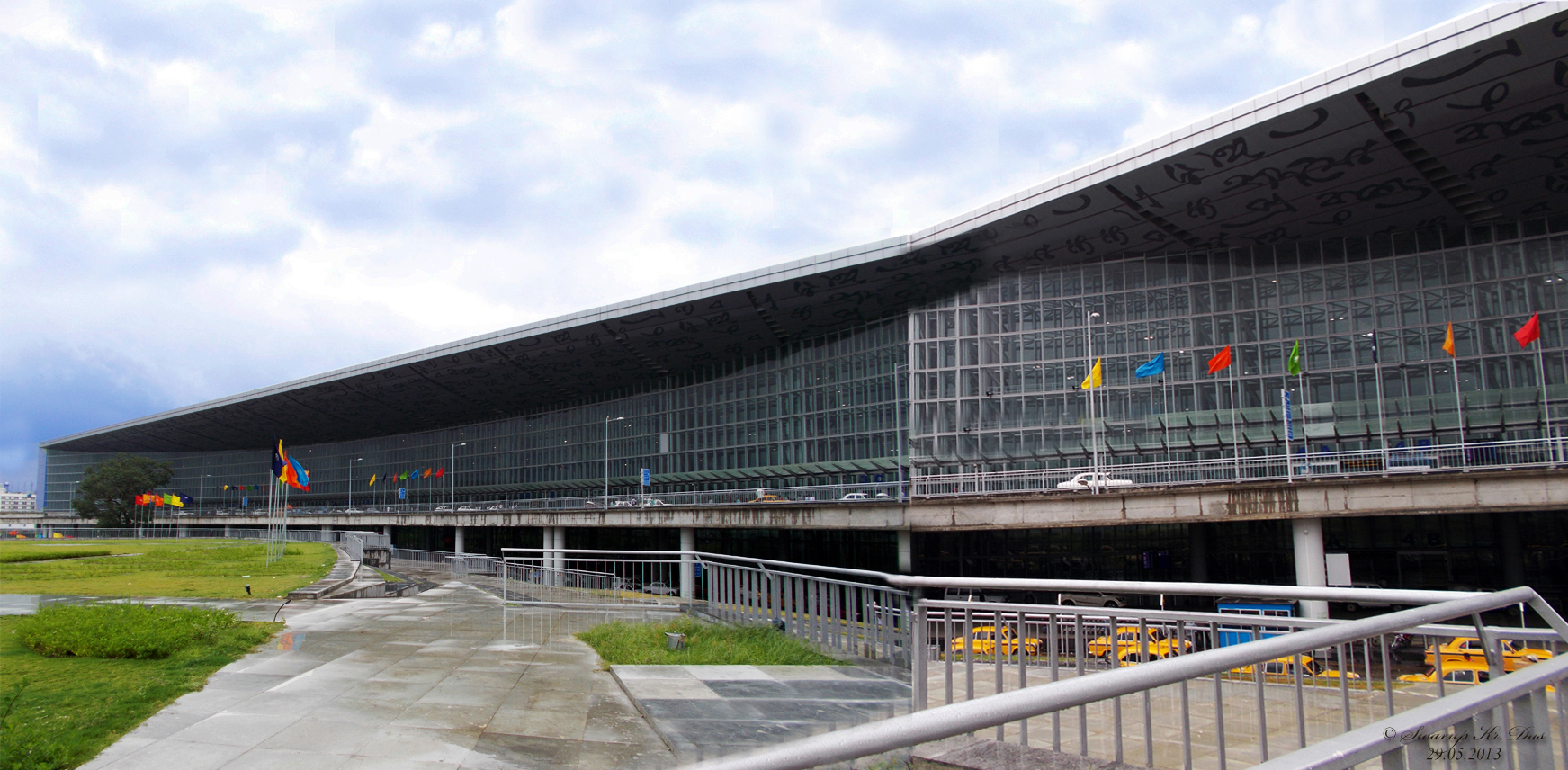
- IATA: CCU; ICAO: VECC; WMO: 42809

Summary
- Airport type: Public
- Owner/Operator: Airports Authority of India
- Serves: Kolkata Metropolitan Region
- Location: Dum Dum, Kolkata, West Bengal, India
- Opened: 21 December 1924; 101 years ago
- Hub for: Air India Express; Blue Dart Aviation; IndiGo; Alliance Air
- Focus city for: Air India
- Operating base for: SpiceJet
- Built: Early 1900s as the Calcutta Aerodrome
- Time zone: IST (UTC+05:30)
- Elevation AMSL: 5 m (16 ft)
- Coordinates: 22°39′17″N 088°26′48″E
- Public transit access: Yellow Line Jai Hind; Orange Line Jai Hind; WBTC AC Bus; Prepaid Taxis and App-based Cabs
- Website: www.nscbiairport.com

Map
- Location within Kolkata Location within West Bengal Location within India

Runways
Direction	Length		Surface
Direction	m	ft	Surface
01L/19R	2,832	9,291	Asphalt
01R/19L	3,633	11,919	Asphalt

Statistics (April 2025 - March 2026)
- Passengers: 21,102,741 (▼3.3%)
- Aircraft movements: 142,261 (▼4.5%)
- Cargo tonnage: 168,244.8 (▲1.6%)
- Source: AAI

Netaji Subhas Chandra Bose International Airport (IATA: CCU, ICAO: VECC) (Note: Bengali pronunciation: [netad͡ʒi suβaʃ t͡ʃɔndro boʃu antord͡ʒatik bimanbɔndor]) is the international airport serving the city of Kolkata and the Kolkata metropolitan area, the capital metropolis of the Indian state of West Bengal. It is the primary aviation hub for eastern and northeastern India. It is located in Dum Dum and in proximity to Jessore Road, approximately 16 km (9.9 mi) from Dalhousie Square and Howrah Junction via the Howrah Bridge. The airport was originally known as Dum Dum Airport before being renamed in 1995 after Subhas Chandra Bose, one of the most prominent leaders of the Indian independence movement. The airport's IATA code CCU is associated with "Calcutta", the city's name until 2001. Opened in 1924, the airport is one of the oldest airports in India.

Spread over an area of 6.64 square kilometres (2.56 sq mi), the airport is the largest hub for air traffic in the eastern part of the country and one of the four operational airports in the state, the others being Bagdogra Airport in Siliguri, Cooch Behar Airport in Cooch Behar and Kazi Nazrul Islam Airport in Durgapur. The airport handled around 22 million passengers in the financial year 2024–25, making it the sixth-busiest airport in India in terms of passenger traffic, after Delhi, Mumbai, Bengaluru, Hyderabad and Chennai airports. The airport is also a major centre for flights to northeast India, Bangladesh, Bhutan, Southeast Asia and the Middle Eastern cities of Dubai, Doha and Abu Dhabi.

== History ==
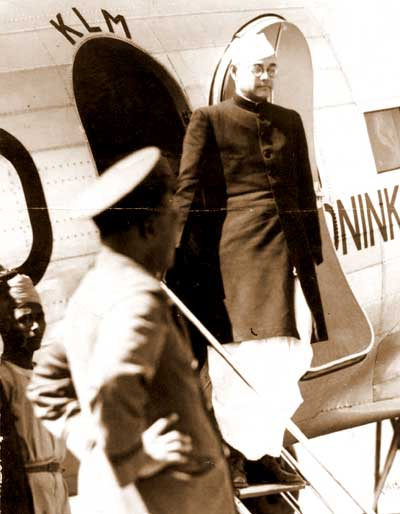
Subhas Chandra Bose at the airport in 1938

=== Early history ===
Netaji Subhas Chandra Bose International Airport was founded in the early 1900s as the Calcutta Aerodrome. The airport traditionally served as a strategic stopover on the air route from North America and Europe to Indochina and Australia. Dakota 3 was the first aircraft to land in the airport. In 1924, KLM began scheduled stops at Calcutta, as part of their Amsterdam to Batavia (Jakarta) route. The same year, a Royal Air Force aircraft landed in Calcutta as part of the first round-the-world expedition by any air force.

The airport began as an open ground next to the Royal Artillery Armoury in Dum Dum. Sir Stanley Jackson, Governor of Bengal, opened the Bengal Flying Club at Dum Dum/Calcutta aerodrome in February 1929. In 1930, the airfield was made fit for use throughout the year, and other airlines began to utilise the airport. Air Orient began scheduled stops as part of a Paris to Saigon route and Imperial Airways began flights from London to Australia via Calcutta in 1933, thus drew many airlines to Calcutta Airport. Many pioneering flights passed through the airport, including Amelia Earhart's in 1937.

Calcutta played an important role in the Second World War. In 1942, the United States Army Air Forces 7th Bombardment Group flew B-24 Liberator bombers from the airport on combat missions over Burma. The airfield was used as a cargo aerial port for the Air Transport Command and was also used as a communication centre for the Tenth Air Force.

The secondary runway in the current-day airport was the original runway built in 1932–33. A second runway had been proposed in the east-west direction which would intersect midway with the first runway. This would cater to the increasing combat flight activities during the war. However, the plan was discarded due to the threat imposed by the potential bombing of the airfied by the Imperial Japanese Armed Forces during the war. Hence, the authorities settled for a parallel runway which was built in 1942–43, parallel to the first runway at a separation of 213 metres (699 ft).

=== Post-independence (1947–2007) ===
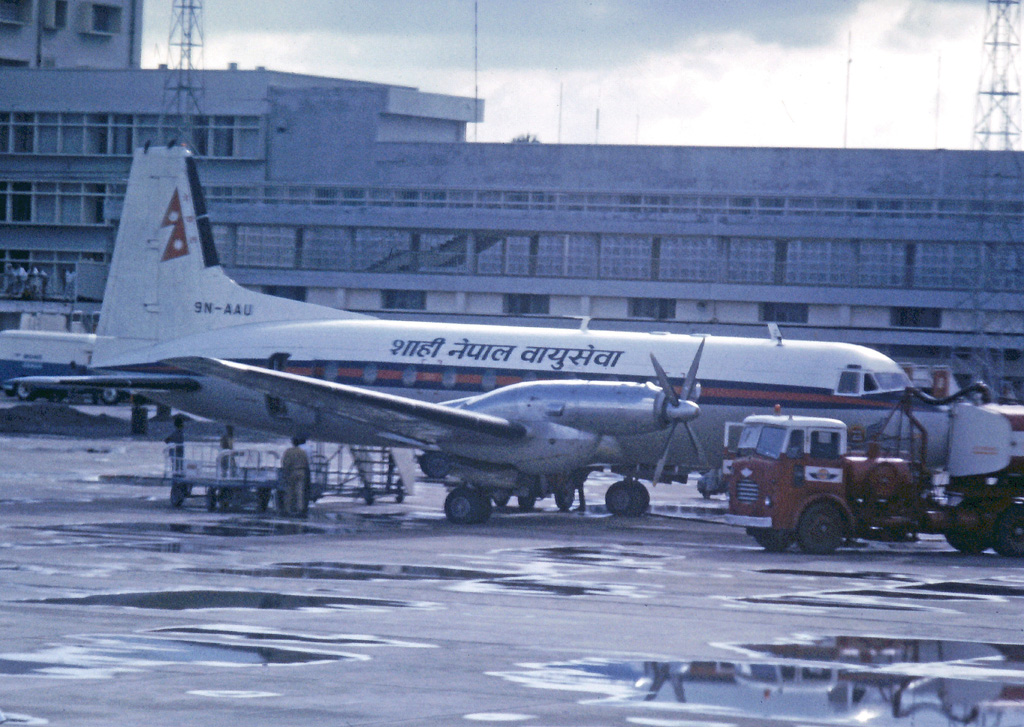
Nepal Airlines at Dum Dum Airport in 1974

Passenger services grew after the Second World War. Calcutta became a destination for the world's first jet-powered passenger aircraft, the de Havilland Comet, on a British Overseas Airways Corporation (BOAC) route to London. Furthermore, in 1964 Indian Airlines introduced the first Indian domestic jet service, using Caravelle jets on the Calcutta–Delhi route. Between the 1940s and 1960s, the airport was served by several major airlines including Aeroflot, Air France, Alitalia, Cathay Pacific, Japan Airlines, Philippine Airlines, KLM, Lufthansa, Pan Am, Qantas, Swissair, and SAS.

Due to the introduction of longer-haul aircraft and the poor political climate of Calcutta during the 1960s and also during the year 1971, several airlines discontinued their service to the airport. The 1971 Bangladesh Liberation War saw a large increase of both refugees and disease in Calcutta, causing more airlines to cease services to the city. In 1975, the airport opened the first dedicated cargo terminal in India.

The 1990s saw new growth for Calcutta Airport, as the Indian aviation industry saw the arrival of new airlines such as Jet Airways and Air Sahara. A new domestic terminal named Terminal 2 was opened in 1995 making the international one Terminal 1, and the airport was renamed in honour of Netaji Subhas Chandra Bose. In 2000, a new international arrival hall was opened.

The year 2005 saw the growth of low-cost carriers in the Indian aviation sector, with new airlines including SpiceJet, IndiGo, and Kingfisher Airlines. This led to a dramatic rise in passenger numbers at the airport. Overcrowding in both terminals led to the implementation of a comprehensive modernisation plan for the airport.

=== Modernisation (2008–present) ===
The modernisation plan for the Kolkata Airport received the final nod on 14 August 2008. The project worth ₹1,942.51 crore (US$446.5 million) included the construction of a new terminal building with a passengers handling capacity of 20 million passengers per annum (mppa), expansion of secondary runway, upgradation of the navigation facilities, addition of taxiways and parking bays. The then existing domestic and international terminals had a capacity of 4.06 mppa and 0.88 mppa, respectively, and were already saturated having handled 6.45 million and 1.01 million passengers in 2007–08. During 2003–08, the airport saw a 21.4% growth in domestic traffic and 6.4% growth in international traffic with further traffic growth of 19% per annum expected till 2011–12. A series of approvals were granted between April 2007 and May 2008 from multiple authorities for the project.

The secondary runway would be extended to 3,239 m (10,627 ft) at a cost of ₹35 crore (US$8.05 million) along with the construction of 11 parking bays and a taxiway at ₹65 crore (US$14.94 million) and the upgradation of infrastructure including Communication, Navigation and Surveillance (CNS) equipment at ₹185 crore (US$42.52 million). A fund of ₹40 crore (US$9.19 million) was also allocated to construct a grade separator and connecting the airport with the roadway and railway network of the city. The Airports Authority of India (AAI) would provide 80% of the project fund (₹1554 crore) while the rest would be sought through commercial borrowings. The AAI had already spent ₹32 crore for consultancy and other preparatory work for the project in the fiscal year. The presence of a 119-year-old mosque that lies 30 metres from the secondary runway's northern end meant the runway would be expanded from the southern end. The proposed taxiway would join the northern ends of both the runways.

==== Instrument Landing System upgradation ====
In February 2014, the Kolkata Airport had sent a proposal to upgrade its Instrument Landing System (ILS) facilities in the runway to the higher authorities. The approval and project sanction, worth ₹120 crore (equivalent to ₹209 crore or US$22 million in 2026), was received in August that year. The project was expected to be executed between February–March and December 2015. As part of the upgradation, the primary runway's southern stretch (01R), then equipped with a CAT II ILS, would be upgraded to CAT III-B. This would reduce the chances of ceasing flight operations during foggy winter and harsh weather conditions when there is a drop in visibility. Flight operations were affected 12 times or 50 hours, which delayed over 500 flights, during the winter of 2013–14. The CAT III-B lights, which will be guiding the aircraft on the taxiway till the parking bays, will be installed at 24 of the 54 bays. Further, the pock-marked primary runway would be re-carpeted while the secondary runway would also be upgraded to CAT II. The CAT III-B operations in the airport only began on 4 January 2018. Meanwhile, 19L was already equipped with CAT II.

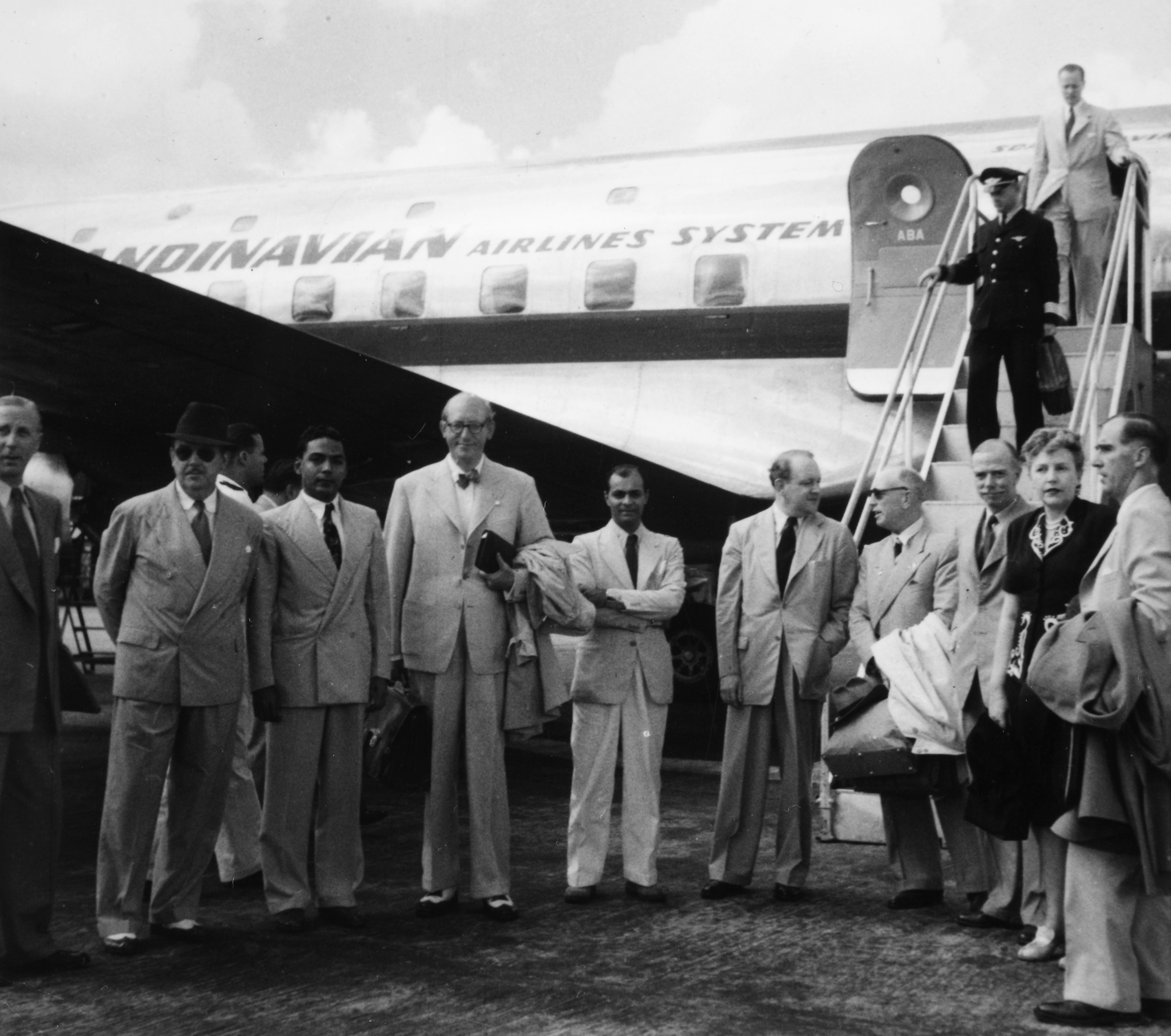
Scandinavian Airlines is one of the many European airlines that used to operate to Kolkata. This is their inaugural flight to Kolkata.

The modernisation plan included some improvements of the airport's existing terminals, including the addition of extra ticketing counters, check-in kiosks, and cafes to the domestic terminal in 2009. However, the need to replace the airport's terminals entirely led to plans for a new integrated terminal, known as T2 to differentiate it from the older domestic block, to serve both international and domestic destinations. A Thai-based company, the Italian-Thai Development (ITD) Corporation (ITD-ITDCem JV, a consortium of ITD and ITD Cementation) and the 125-year-old iconic Project Management Consultant–Parsons Brinckerhoff (PB) was hired with Delhi-based designer Sikka Associates Architects to construct the building. Construction commenced in November 2008, and T2 was inaugurated on 20 January 2013 after overshooting the previous deadlines of July 2011 and August 2012. The former airport hotel 'Ashok' was demolished to give way for two new five-star luxury hotels and a shopping mall in its place.

Commercial operations were intended to start on 23 January 2013, the 116th birth anniversary of Netaji Subhas Chandra Bose. However, the shift to the new terminal was only completed on 16 March 2013. Airports Council International named it the best improved airport in the Asia-Pacific region in 2014 and 2015.

On 27 November 2025, the CAT III-B ILS for the 19L approach of the primary runway was activated for the first time. This was an upgrade from the CAT II ILS for the side, though the 01R approach was already equipped with CAT III-B earlier.

==== Air traffic control modernisation ====
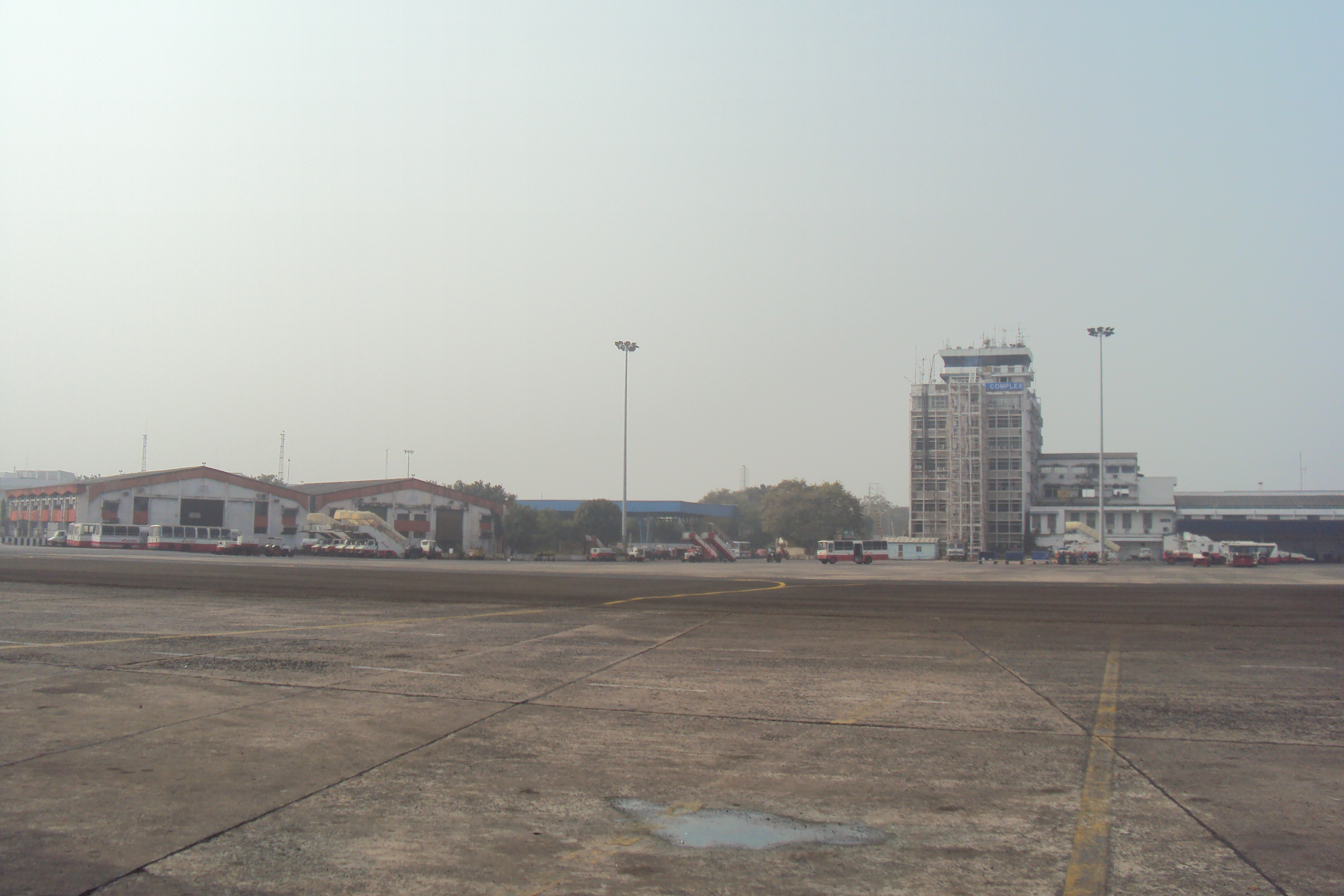
The new 56 m-tall ATC complex of NSCBIA under construction in 2012.

An 86-metre (282 ft)-tall air traffic control tower was planned to be established for the airport in 2008 in order to replace the existing 35-metre (115 ft)-tall building commissioned in 1972 which has been grappling with space constraints for modernisation and monitoring limitations, especially for aircraft parked along international wing of T2 building.

The project had been shelved in 2011 due to lack of funds. The top brass of the Airports Authority of India (AAI) granted the in-principle approval for the ₹240 crore (US$40.96 million) project in January 2013 with the execution to begin after the transition to new terminal was completed in July. The project details would then be sent to higher authorities for the budget to be sanctioned with another 18 months was expected to float a tender and select bids for flight data processing system, radar data processing system, data control processing system and new monitors. An additional six months would be required for the systems installations and testing. Full operationalisation was expected by 2016.

In May 2013, the project received a funding of ₹270 crore (US$46.08 million), including ₹120 crore (US$20.48 million) for the building and ₹150 crore (US$25.6 million) to upgrade air navigation and surveillance systems. As represented in the cover of AAI's Airports India magazine dated February 2016, the new ATC tower's height was revised to 112 m (367 ft). However, the height was again halved to 57 m (187 ft) in February 2017 when AAI released the tender for the construction of the facility, akin with the ATC tower in Edinburgh Airport. The ATC Guild (India), a union of the air traffic controllers of India, was unhappy with such revision and defended the earlier plan, stating that the height would not have caused safety hazard but a shorter tower would be obsolete much earlier.

By June 2022, the existing navigation and surveillance equipment, installed in 2013, was nearing its end of 10-year life cycle and required a new generation of control systems like Level IV Advanced Surface Movement Guidance and Control System (A-SMGCS) as well as new automation system, voice communication, VHF antenna with three outputs, ground guidance and surveillance equipment for aircraft and other vehicles, and equipment to broadcast meteorological data to aircraft. The cost of the entire set of equipment is estimated at up to ₹400 crore (US$50.89 million).

The civil work of the facility was completed in February 2024 followed by the installation of electrical lines and optic fibre cables in May 2024. The operational trials of the new complex commenced on 24 March 2025. The tower, with a workforce of eight controllers along with technicians from Communication, Navigation and Surveillance (CNS) department, coordinated the take-off and landing of around 40 aircraft from 2 pm to 4 pm. The first aircraft to land during the trials was an IndiGo flight from Bengaluru. Another controller team stood by in the existing ATC tower as backup for contingencies in the new facility. Such operations will continue from the new tower over the same time daily for three months before the duration can be increased. Full-fledged operations would only begin after 18–24 months when the modern equipment are yet to be selected and procured including a new generation automation system, approach radar, advanced surface movement guidance and control system as well as a VHF communication equipment. The equipment could be procured, installed and operationalised only after the tenders are floated. Until then, controllers in the new ATC tower will utilise modified equipment that was procured and installed in 2012 and 2013.

On 7 October, a short circuit in the AC system of the new complex, detected by five controllers reporting for duty, revealed the lack of an emergency exit. This shut the operations from the facility until 20 October after which operations restarted. However, full operational clearance could only be received from the DGCA, BCAS and the fire department after the emergency exit is arranged.

The new complex has been functioning since 2025 simultaneously with the older facility for two hours in the afternoon of every weekday. Full operation is yet to be cleared as the modern equipment are yet to be procured.

== Infrastructure ==
=== Runways ===
Netaji Subhash Chandra Bose International Airport has two parallel runways, the primary runway 01R/19L has a capacity of approximately 35 flights per hour and the secondary runway 01L/19R has a capacity of 15 flights per hour. The secondary runway is usually used as a taxiway when the main runway is used. When the primary runway is shut down for maintenance purposes, the secondary runway is used. The limited separation of 213 metres (699 ft) between the runways restricts their simultaneous use. The secondary runway was expected to undergo a recarpeting under a ₹224 crore (equivalent to ₹239 crore or US$25 million in 2026) project in 2025. By September 2025, the improvements have enhanced the operating capacity of the airport from 35 to 45 flights per hour.

Runways at NSCBI Airport
Runway number	Length	Width	Approach lights/ILS
01L/19R	2,832 m (9,291 ft)	46 m (151 ft)	No ILS / CAT I
01R/19L	3,633 m (11,919 ft)	46 m (151 ft)	CAT III-B / CAT III-B

=== Hangars and ground services ===
Air India operates hangars at the airport, while Bharat Petroleum and Indian Oil act as fuellers. Catering facilities are owned by Taj-Sats and Oberoi Flight Services.

=== Air Traffic Navigation Complex ===
The Kolkata air traffic control acts as the area control centre (ACC) for the Kolkata flight information region (FIR) which spans 1,400,000 km^{2} (540,000 sq mi) of airspace. This is the largest continental arspace under an Indian FIR. The controllers from the third floor manage 1,000–1,400 flights flying across the Kolkata FIR along with 350 arrivals and departures at the airport. In March 2021 and March 2023, the entire upper airspace, which includes flight paths situated at altitudes beyond 25,000 ft (7,600 m), under the jurisdiction of the ATC at Guwahati (from Dibrugarh to Agartala) and Varanasi (from Khajuraho to Lucknow; 170,000 km^{2} (66,000 sq mi)) was shifted into the respeonsibility of the Kolkata ATC as part of the AAI's Upper Airspace Harmonisation initiative in the four of India's FIRs in order to save fuel and reduce airline's operational costs.

The air traffic at the airport is currently controlled from a legacy 35-metre (115 ft)-tall building commissioned in 1972. The majority of the air traffic control is conducted from the third and eighth floor of the building. It hosts the meteorological department, communication department, area control, tower control and anti-hijack room. However, the building has been facing space constraints for modernisation and monitoring limitations, especially for aircraft parked along international wing of T2 building.

To solve the crisis, a new air traffic navigation (ATN) complex has been constructed under a project worth ₹458 crore (equivalent to ₹473 crore or US$51 million in 2026). The complex includes area control and technical blocks. The spiral torch-shaped tower has a height of 56 metres (184 ft) and is equipped with advanced digital technology for communication and air traffic systems. The technical block will host flight data and radar data processing systems, data control processing system, and new monitoring systems. While the surface movement control and tower units will be based in a glass chamber in the apex of the tower, the remaining units, including aerodrome control, approach control and area control would be hosted at the three-storied technical block at the base. The area of the new complex is 1,330.0 m^{2} (14,316 sq ft) against 710 m^{2} (7,640 sq ft) for the older building. Further, the area of the visual control room atop the facility is 229.9 m^{2} (2,475 sq ft) compared to 117 m^{2} (1,260 sq ft) earlier. The new complex has been functioning since 2025 simultaneously with the older facility between 2 pm and 4 pm IST in the afternoon of every weekday. Full operation is yet to be cleared as the modern equipment are yet to be procured.

== Terminals ==
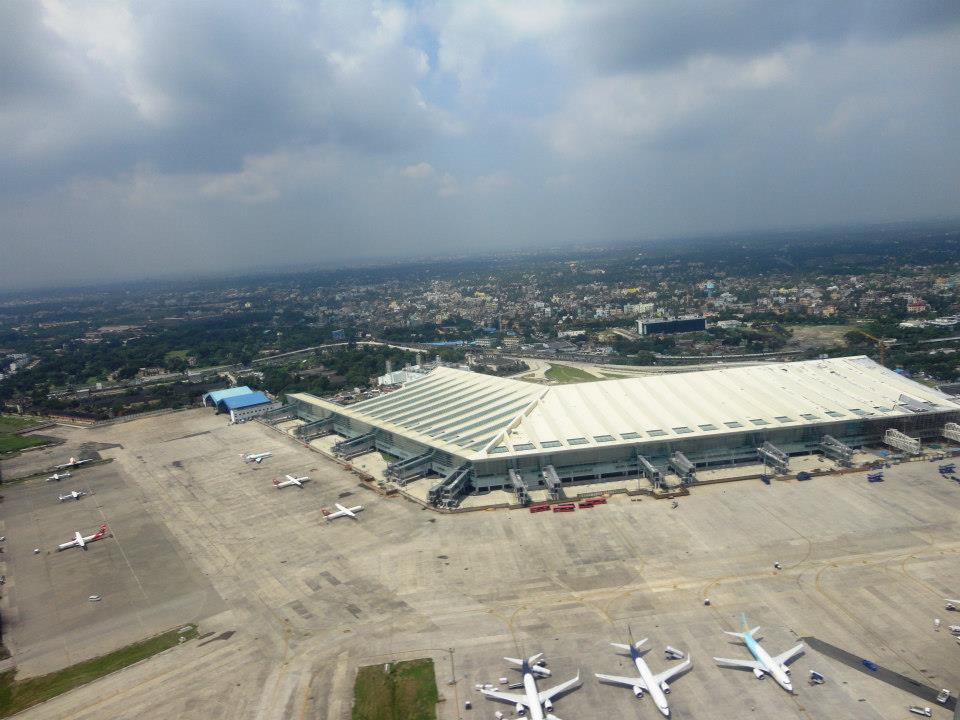
Bird's eye view of the integrated terminal

The airport's new integrated terminal T2 is spread over 233,000 m^{2} (2,510,000 sq ft) and can handle 25 million passengers annually, compared to the previous terminal T1's capacity of five million. The terminal is an L-shaped structure, containing six levels. It contains 128 check-in counters that utilise CUTE (Common User Terminal Equipment) technology and has 78 immigration counters and twelve customs counters. The terminal was developed in a project worth ₹2,325 crore (equivalent to ₹43 billion or US$460 million in 2026). Passenger lounges are provided by Air India. The terminal is equipped with 18 aerobridges and a further 57 remote parking bays. There are plans to construct an 18-foot bronze statue of Netaji Subhas Chandra Bose in the integrated terminal complex.

In the financial year from April 2011 to March 2012, Kolkata Airport served 10.3 million passengers, 85% of whom travelled domestically. The withdrawal of Lufthansa's service to Frankfurt in March 2012 left Kolkata with no direct connections beyond Asia. However, other international operations increased in 2012. The new terminal has attracted some airlines to expand their route networks to include Kolkata.

In September 2012, the Airports Authority of India upgraded the airport's cargo-handling capacity, enabling it to cater for the demand until 2015–16. There has been a 25 per cent growth in international cargo movement to and from Kolkata Airport and a 15 per cent increase in outward transit. Automobile parts accounted for the bulk of the growth in the movement of cargo from the city to other countries. In November 2008 the first Centre for Perishable Cargo (CPC) in West Bengal was opened at the airport. The CPC has an area of 742.5 m^{2} (7,992 sq ft) and an annual storage capacity of 12,000 million tonnes. The CPC had been undergoing trials that started in June 2008 and were built with a ₹6.75 crore (equivalent to ₹8.7 crore or US$930,000 in 2026) grant-in-aid from the Agricultural and Processed Food Products Export Development Authority (APEDA) part of the Commerce Ministry. The volume of export was 21,683 tonnes in 2008–09, during the current fiscal more than 23,042 tonnes of cargo were handled by the airport. Similarly, the volume of import cargo increased from 16,863 tonnes to 18,733 tonnes, increasing over ten per cent during the same period. However, in 2008–09 the total volume of cargo handled by the airport declined by 4.8% from the previous year.

On 3 June 2019, Singapore Airlines operated the Airport's maiden Airbus A350 service from Singapore to Kolkata, enhancing the weekly seat capacity.

=== Previous terminals ===
Kolkata's old international and domestic terminals closed permanently when the integrated terminal opened. However, there were plans to renovate the old international terminal to be used for future hajj services, while the domestic terminal could be used by regional airlines. An earlier proposal of continuing low-cost carrier operations from the existing domestic terminal has been shelved due to the need to fully utilise the new integrated terminal's capacity, making it the first airport in India to shift even its low-cost domestic airlines to the new integrated building upon completion. However, the old terminal will be replaced by a new terminal T3 to increase the overall capacity.

== Expansion ==
The integrated terminal T2 was commissioned in 2013 with an annual capacity of 20 million passengers. The terminal served 9 million passengers in the first year. However, by 2016, the amount quickly rose to 16 million. At this rate, the terminal would be saturated by 2018. This necessitated the airport authority to plan another phase of expansions. In June 2017, the then director of Kolkata airport, Atul Dixit, unveiled the plans of the next phase of expansion to enhance the airport's capacity to 40 million passengers per annum. The first nod for a third terminal was received from the aviation ministry by then. The old air traffic control complex and both of the old terminals, located in the North of the T2, would be demolished to establish the third terminal. In September, a US aviation planning and development firm based in Cincinnati, Landrum & Brown (L&B), was appointed to formulate a master plan to enhance the capacity and efficiency of the airport.

The plan was reportedly sanctioned in February 2020 and first phase expansion was expected to be completed within 30 months.

Initially, the existing terminal will undergo an interim expansion of ₹130 crore (equivalent to ₹138 crore or US$15 million in 2026) that will see the terminal handle an additional 2 million passengers annually, bringing the total handling capacity of the existing terminal to 28 million passengers annually. Then, a new ₹4,500 crore (equivalent to ₹48 billion or US$510 million in 2026) expansion plan will be undertaken in two phases over a span of six years.

Upon completion of the project, the new terminal will serve both domestic and international flights with annual capacity of 11 million passengers. This will bring the airport's capacity to 40 million. Further, the existing integrated terminal, which will exclusively handle domestic flights will have a revised capacity of 34 million passengers, taking the airport's overall capacity to 45 million (36 million domestic passengers and 9 million international passengers) by 2032–33. This will mark a nine-fold increase in the airport's capacity within two decades. The old terminals had a combined 5 million passengers per annum capacity until March 2013.

=== Interim expansions ===
An interim expansion phase, also referred to as modular expansion phase, will be implemented to meet the airport's short-term passenger growth demands. In this phase, the old terminal and the T2 integrated terminal will be connected with three aerobridges and walkalators as well as walk-in doors at ground level. The former will be used for boarding and de-boarding passengers from aircraft. Passengers arriving in the boarding building would take the connecting bridge to the terminal T2 and then leave the airport. This is meant to decongest the airport in peak hours and immediately enhance passenger capacity by a million.

Under the modular expansion, the security hold area (SHA), the lounge where passengers wait after the security checks until the aircraft boarding begins, will be expanded for the integrated terminal T2. The SHA could be extended to the left of T2 in place of the old domestic terminal. Ten aerobridges are planned to be added to the terminal. Of the 18 existing aerobridges, 14 serve domestic flights while 4 serve international ones. Each bridge is capable of serving 10 flights per day.

The expansion was underway as of April 2025, and was slated for completion by December. The project is expected to add over 6,600 m^{2} (71,000 sq ft) of space to the terminal including — 5,590 m^{2} (60,200 sq ft) and 1,000 m^{2} (10,800 sq ft) space — in the international and domestic wings, respectively. The expansion project would introduce these changes : –

- Domestic departure wing
  - 1,000 m^{2} (10,800 sq ft) for the Security Hold Area (SHA),
- International departure wing
  - shifting the Immigration, Customs and Pre-Embarkation Security Check (PESC) facilities to a new 2,990 m^{2} (32,200 sq ft) space,
  - one-third or around 930 m^{2} (10,000 sq ft) area in the vacated area would be used for passenger amenities like Food & Beverage (F&B) and retail outlets as well as offices, and
  - a 2,600 m^{2} (28,000 sq ft) expansion for the SHA.

These expansions will enhance the airport's capacity to 28 million passengers per annum. A budget of ₹130 crore (equivalent to ₹138 crore or US$15 million in 2026) has been earmarked for this phase. This will provide an additional time of four to five years, until 2030–31, to the airport authority for a long-term solution to accommodate the passenger growth, including the construction of a new terminal.

By June 2026, the 966 m^{2} (10,400 sq ft) section was commissioned in the completing the expansion of the domestic wing. Meanwhile, the 2,990 m^{2} (32,200 sq ft) section for the Immigration, Customs and PESC facilities in the international departure sections was completed and would be operationalised soon.

=== Phase 1 ===
Under the first phase of expansion, the old domestic terminal, which was operation between 1995 and 2013 and has a built-up area of 22,000 m^{2} (240,000 sq ft), will be demolished and a new terminal, spread over an area of 120,000 m^{2} (1,300,000 sq ft), will be constructed. This will increase the airport's capacity by 40% to 33 million passengers. As of 2019, the design of the new terminal was to be finalised by early 2020.

As of December 2024, the demolition would begin in August 2025 and would take a year. Simultaneously, a tender will be floated for the construction of the new terminal which is expected to commence in early 2026. The overall terminal project, worth ₹4,500 crore (equivalent to ₹48 billion or US$510 million in 2026), will be completed in two phases. The new terminal would be designed in order to efficiently utilise its relatively shorter frontage but service more aircraft at a time than the existing linear integrated terminal.

The new building will be U-shaped and have three sections — a rectangular section and two arm-like concourses. The rectangular section, located at the parking lot of old terminal, will host the check-in counters, security check portals and baggage handling facilities. Meanwhile, the two concourses, at the northern and southern ends of the rectangular sections and extending eastwards, will host the operational area like boarding gates and aerobridges. The rectangular section and southern arm will be built as part of the phase 1, which has been sanctioned by the AAI.

As of July 2025, the demolition of the old domestic terminal is scheduled to be completed by the year-end or early 2026. The entire terminal that will be completed under this phase will exclusively serve international flights and will have an annual capacity of 9 million passengers. As of June 2026, the demolition is scheduled following the end of Hajj service on 19 June.

=== Phase 2 ===
By the time the first phase construction of the new terminal will be completed, the new Air Traffic Navigation Complex will be fully operational and the old tower building and former international terminal will be demolished. Following this, the second phase construction will commence. This includes the northern concourse, located at on the existing Air Traffic Services (ATS) building. Ultimately the new terminal will also require 21 parking bays connected with aerobridges. The construction is aimed to be completed in 2029–30. The terminal will handle both domestic and international traffic while the T2 will be dedicated to domestic traffic. In fact, after removing the immigration, customs, and other related operations, the capacity of T2 will also be increased by 0.6 million passengers.

=== Other developments ===
In 2019, the airport had 65 active parking bays. The parking bays remained fully occupied at night except for three parking bays that are required to be reserved for diverted flights. This necessitated to expand parking facilities with the growing demands of the Indian airlines. The AAI planned to develop over 380 parking bays in 23 airports. Airports in Kolkata and Ahmedabad, followed by Lucknow, would take the lead in this initiative.

Amid this development, the AAI had earmarked ₹200 crore (US$28.4 million) to take the parking bays quantity to 105 by the end of 2024. An additional ₹150 crore (US$21.3 million) was earmarked extend the taxiway F of the airport. An amount of ₹250 crore (US$35.5 million) had been invested to extend the taxiway and develop 20 parking bays by 2021. Work for the first set of 10 bays had begun following which the old airport fire station would be demolished for the next 10 bays. After the completion of these 20 bays, another contract, worth ₹100 crore (US$14.2 million), for the rest of 20 bays will be awarded.

However, as of 2025, the airport operates 73 parking bays. Further, two additional bays will be made operational by the year-end and will be followed by activation of 10 bays and 19 bays in 2030 and 2032, respectively. In 2033, an additional 28 bays will be commissioned and will bring to the total number of parking bays to 132. This will ensure the parallel increase of terminal and airside infrastructure. Parking bays will also be developed on the eastern flank of the airport.

The cargo terminal of the airport, currently located in the north western sector of the airport, will be moved to the west of the VIP Road. When relocated, the space occupied by the current cargo terminal will give way for the development of more parking bays as well as passenger terminal expansion.

== Airlines and destinations ==
=== Passenger ===
Airlines	Destinations
Air Arabia	Abu Dhabi
Air India	Delhi, Mumbai–Shivaji
Air India Express	Agartala, Bengaluru, Chennai, Guwahati, Imphal, Indore, Jaipur, Port Blair, Pune, Siliguri, Srinagar
Akasa Air	Ahmedabad, Bengaluru, Delhi, Mumbai–Navi, Mumbai–Shivaji, Port Blair, Pune
AirAsia	Kuala Lumpur–International
Alliance Air	Ambikapur, Bilaspur, Guwahati, Imphal, Jabalpur, Lilabari, Patna, Rewa, Rupsi
Bhutan Airlines	Bangkok–Suvarnabhumi, Paro
Biman Bangladesh Airlines	Dhaka
Buddha Air	Kathmandu
China Eastern Airlines	Kunming
Drukair	Gelephu, Paro
Emirates	Dubai–International
Etihad Airways	Abu Dhabi
flyadeal	Seasonal Charter: Medina
flydubai	Dubai–International
IndiGo	Agartala, Ahmedabad, Aizawl, Amritsar, Bangkok–Suvarnabhumi, Bengaluru, Bhubaneswar, Chandigarh, Chennai, Darbhanga, Dehradun, Delhi, Deoghar, Dhaka, Dibrugarh, Dimapur, Gaya, Ghaziabad, Goa–Dabolim, Goa–Mopa, Gorakhpur, Guangzhou, Guwahati, Hanoi, Ho Chi Minh City, Hyderabad, Imphal, Indore, Itanagar, Jaipur, Jharsuguda, Jorhat, Lucknow, Mumbai–Navi, Mumbai–Shivaji, Nagpur, Patna, Phuket, Pune, Purnea, Raipur, Ranchi, Shanghai–Pudong, Shillong, Siem Reap, Silchar, Siliguri, Singapore, Srinagar, Surat, Varanasi, Vijayawada, Visakhapatnam
Malaysia Airlines	Kuala Lumpur–International
Myanmar Airways International	Yangon
Qatar Airways	Doha
Singapore Airlines	Singapore
SpiceJet	Ahmedabad, Bagdogra, Bengaluru, Delhi, Mumbai–Shivaji, Port Blair, Srinagar
Star Air	Purnea
Thai AirAsia	Bangkok–Don Mueang
Thai Airways International	Bangkok–Suvarnabhumi
Thai Lion Air	Bangkok–Don Mueang
Thai VietJet Air	Bangkok–Suvarnabhumi
US-Bangla Airlines	Dhaka

=== Cargo ===
Airlines	Destinations
Blue Dart Aviation	Delhi, Guwahati, Mumbai
IndiGo CarGo	Dhaka, Ezhou, Ho Chi Minh City, Kunming
Qatar Airways Cargo	Doha

== Statistics ==
As of the financial year 2024–25, Netaji Subhas Chandra Bose International Airport is the sixth-busiest airport in India in terms of the total number of passengers served and with respect to the number of flights departing and arriving at the airport, which was about 21.8 million passengers in the FY and 408 flights a day respectively. This was a 10.3% increase from the previous year. Out of which, 19.4 million passengers were domestic travellers and 2.4 million were international travellers. The cargo traffic saw an increase of 9.2% from its previous year, with 165,617.9 metric tonnes of cargo, the best CCU has ever handled so far.

Passenger and cargo traffic (2009–2026)
Year	Passengers			Change	Cargo (MT)	Change	Ref
Year	International	Domestic	Total	Change	Cargo (MT)	Change	Ref
2009–10	11,87,160	68,58,564	80,45,724	Steady	1,10,256	Steady	
2010–11	14,28,086	82,03,586	96,31,672	▲19.7%	1,29,957	▲17.9%	
2011–12	15,66,102	87,37,889	1,03,03,991	▲7.0%	1,25,593	▼3.4%	
2012–13	16,44,339	84,24,316	1,00,68,655	▼2.3%	1,23,491	▼1.7%	
2013–14	17,65,013	83,35,219	1,01,00,232	▼0.7%	1,29,782	▲6.2%	
2014–15	19,26,562	89,90,107	1,09,16,669	▲8.1%	1,36,699	▲5.3%	
2015–16	22,17,473	1,02,03,771	1,24,21,244	▲13.8%	1,39,679	▲2.2%	
2016–17	22,30,071	1,35,89,468	1,58,19,539	▲24.0%	1,52, 415	▲9.0%	
2017–18	25,86,775	1,73,05,749	1,98,92,524	▲25.7%	1,63,323	▲7.2%	
2018–19	27,86,805	1,90,90,545	2,18,77,350	▲10.0%	1,55,232	▼5.0%	
2019–20	29,39,322	1,90,76,069	2,20,15,391	▲0.6%	1,53,468	▼1.1%	
2020–21	1,43,081	75,85,825	77,28,906	▼64.9%	1,04,953	▼31.6%	
2021–22	3,42,665	1,06,93,443	1,10,36,108	▲42.8%	1,38,127	▲31.6%	
2022–23	19,56,019	1,58,02,453	1,77,58,472	▲60.9%	1,36,022	▼1.5%	
2023–24	24,68,601	1,73,15,816	1,97,84,417	▲11.4%	1,51,626	▲11.5%	
2024–25	24,19,466	1,94,11,652	2,18,31,118	▲10.3%	1,65,617.9	▲9.2%	
2025–26	22,98,213	1,88,04,528	2,11,02,741	▼3.3%	1,68,244.8	▲1.6%	

Busiest domestic routes from CCU (2024–25)
Rank	Airport	Carriers	Departing passengers
1	Delhi	Air India, IndiGo, SpiceJet, Akasa Air	1,422,349
2	Bengaluru	Air India Express, Akasa Air, IndiGo	1,180,899
3	Mumbai	Air India, Akasa Air, IndiGo, SpiceJet	1,071,297
4	Hyderabad	Air India Express, IndiGo	604,223
5	Guwahati	IndiGo, SpiceJet, Alliance Air (India), Air India Express	552,468
6	Chennai	Air India, Air India Express, IndiGo	535,483
7	Agartala	IndiGo, Air India Express	377,454
8	Bagdogra	SpiceJet, Air India Express, IndiGo	318,782
9	Bhubaneswar	Alliance Air (India), IndiGo, Air India Express	286,814
10	Port Blair	SpiceJet, Air India Express, IndiGo, Akasa Air	274,011

Busiest International routes from CCU (2023–24)
Rank	Airport	Carriers	Departing passengers
1	Dhaka	Air India, Biman Bangladesh, IndiGo, NovoAir, US-Bangla Airlines	2,60,277
3	Bangkok (BKK, DMK)	Bhutan Airlines, IndiGo, Spicejet, Thai Airways, Thai Smile Airways, Thai Air Asia	2,01,982
2	Dubai	Emirates, Flydubai	1,92,424
4	Singapore	IndiGo, Singapore Airlines	1,04,026
5	Doha	Qatar Airways	75,364
6	Kuala Lumpur	AirAsia, Batik Air Malaysia, Malaysia Airlines	61,930
7	Ho Chi Minh City	IndiGo	22,580
8	Kathmandu	Air India	20,930
9	Hanoi	IndiGo	18,158
10	Phuket	IndiGo, Thai AirAsia	15,405

== Ground transport ==
=== Roads ===
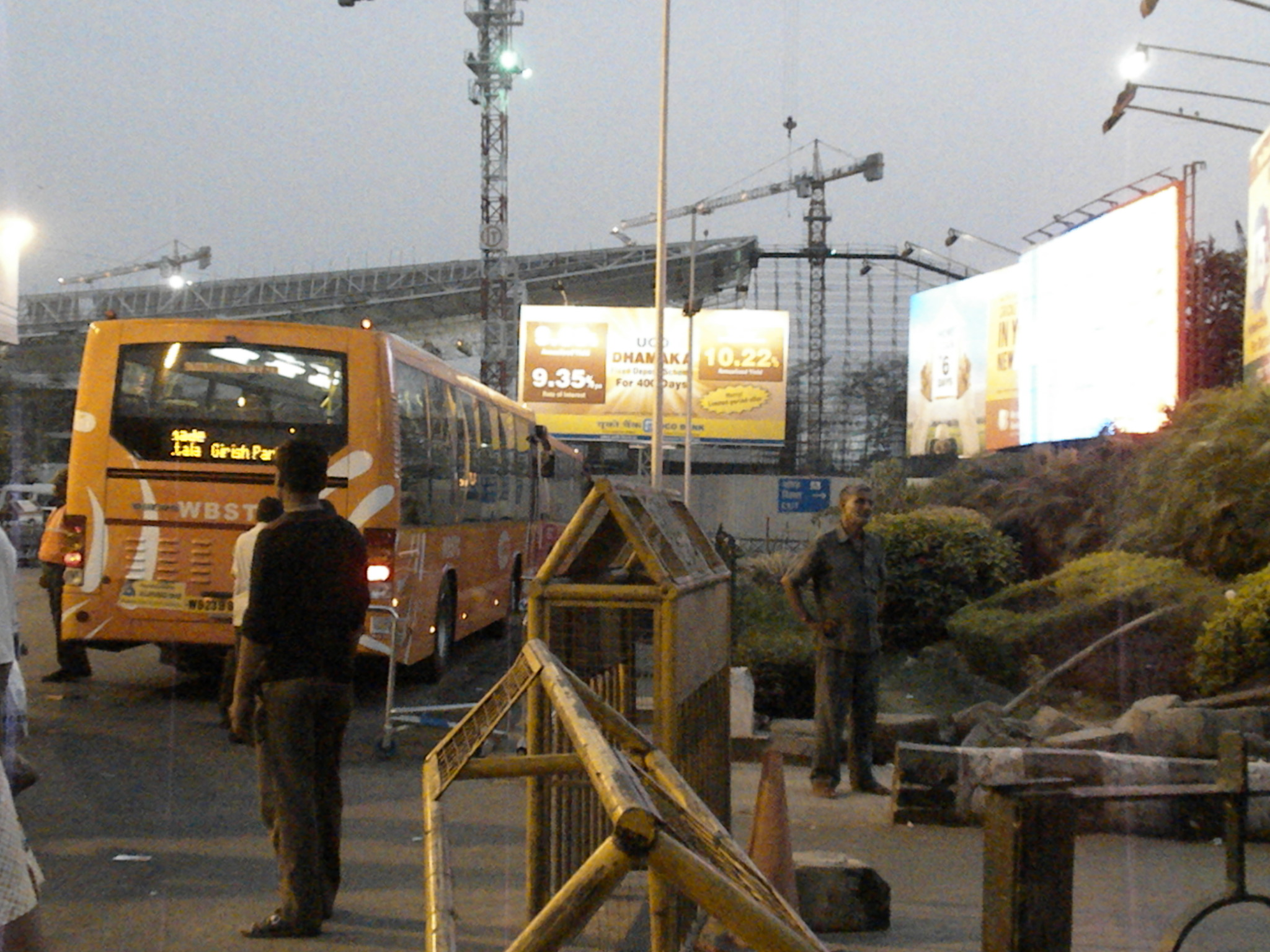
The West Bengal Transport Corporation operates air-conditioned buses from the Airport Bus Terminus

The airport has a well-established facility of prepaid taxis and air-conditioned buses connecting it to the city centre. Ride-hailing services, including Uber and Ola operate here regularly. As part of the larger modernisation programme, a flyover at Nagerbazar and an entry ramp on VIP Road have also been constructed. A 2 kilometres (1.2 mi) flyover from Kestopur to Raghunathpur (near Tegharia) was built to speed up airport-bound traffic. These reduced journey times to the airport. Parking facilities at the new terminal include two underground parking levels accommodating 3000 cars, as well as an outdoor car parking that can handle an additional 2000 cars.

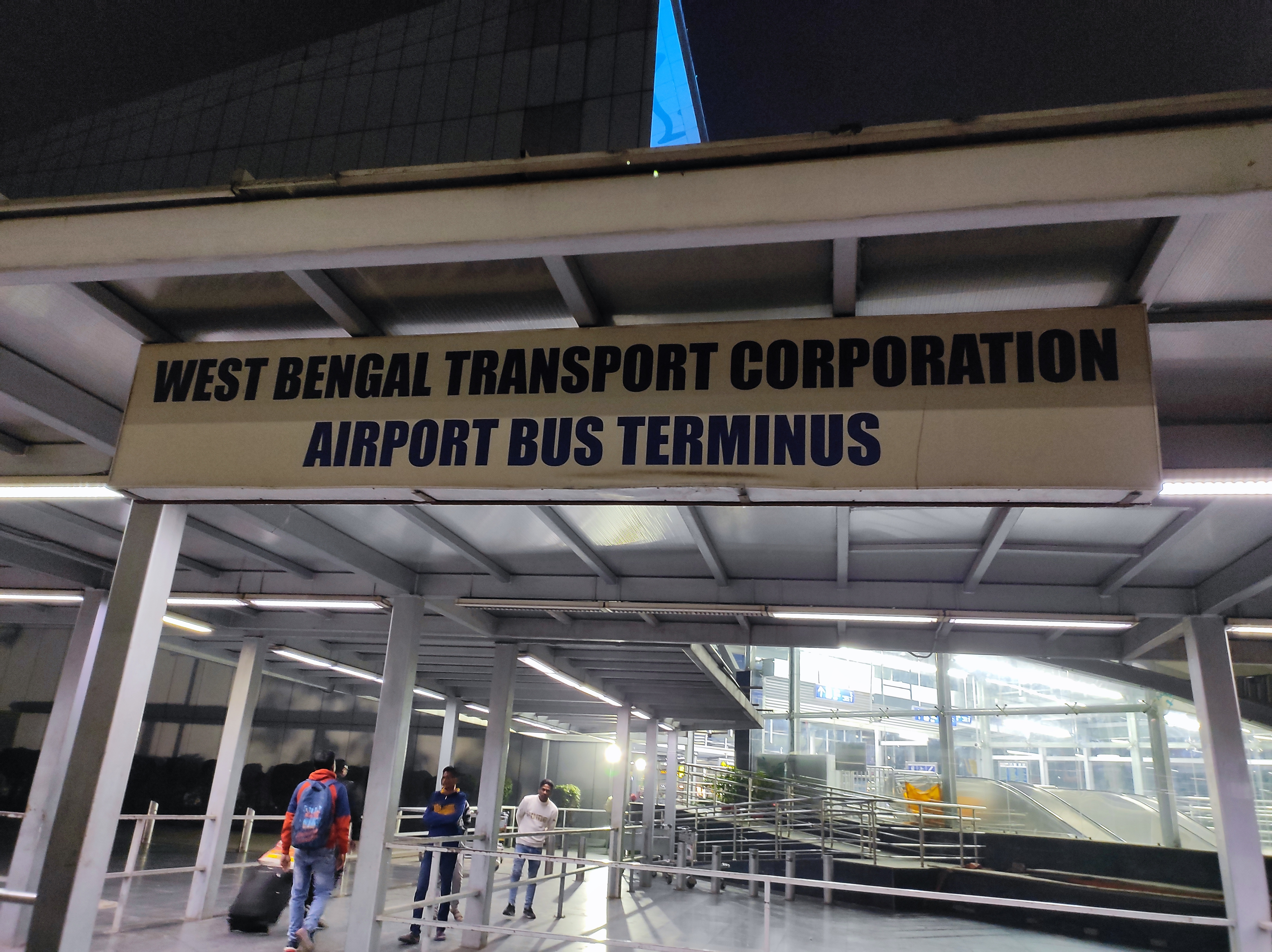
WBTC Airport Bus Terminus

West Bengal Transport Corporation (WBTC) operates air-conditioned buses to major parts of Kolkata from 07:00 to 23:00 Hrs throughout the week.

=== Bus routes ===
- AC 39 (Airport Terminal - Howrah railway station)
- VS 2 (Airport Terminal - Howrah railway station)
- V1 (Airport Terminal - Tollygunge)
- VS 1 (Airport Terminal - Esplanade)
- AC 37C (Airport Terminal - Garia)
- AC 37A (Airport Terminal - Garia)
- AC 43 (Airport Terminal - Golf Green)

=== Metro ===
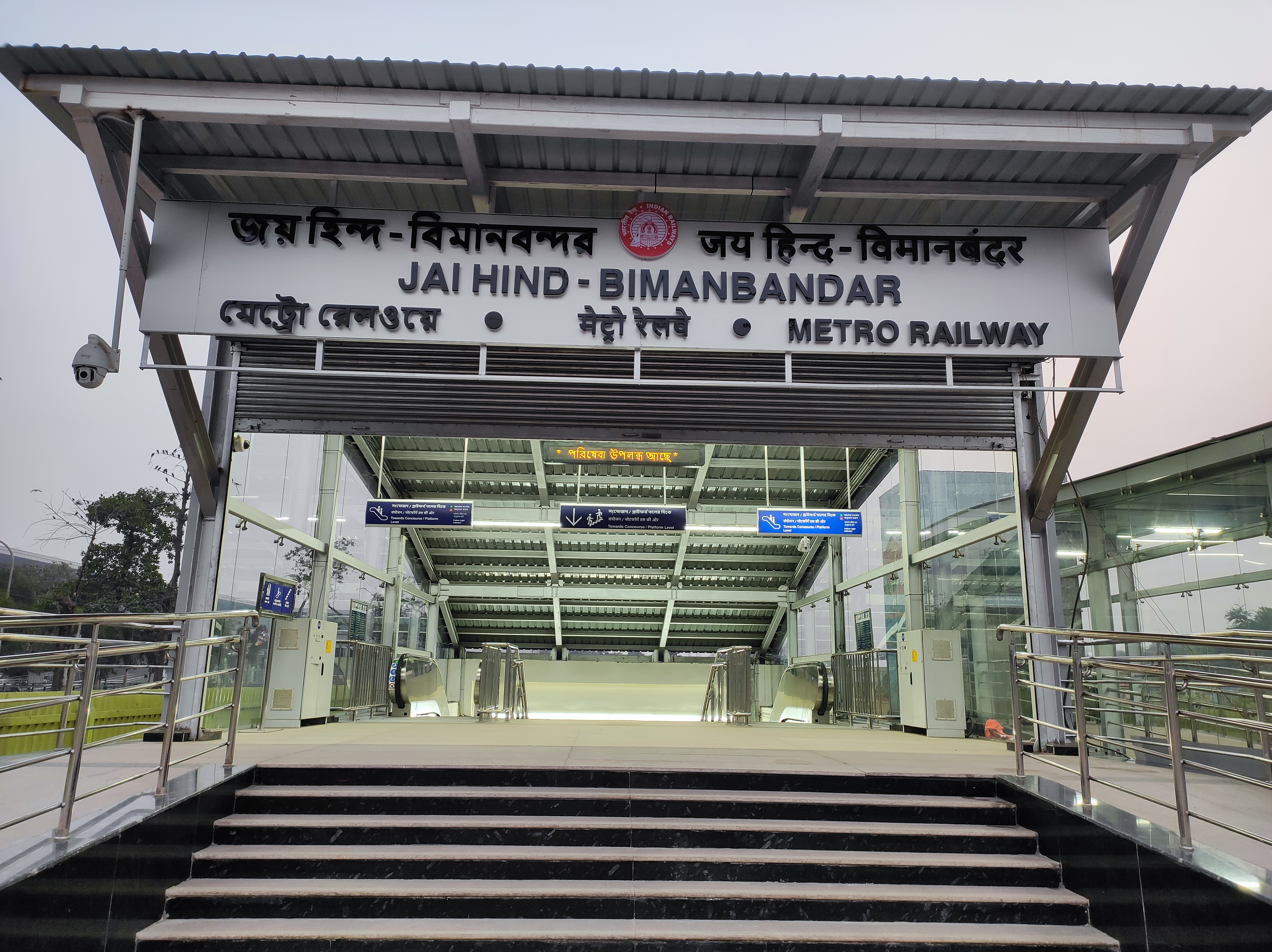
Jai Hind (Airport) Metro Station

The airport is connected at Jai Hind metro station, which opened on 22 August 2025 with one Kolkata Metro line from Noapara (Yellow Line). It is the largest underground metro station in India and the station will eventually also serve another line from New Garia (Orange Line). Both lines will converge at Jai Hind, with Orange line terminating at this station and Yellow Line moving towards Barasat metro station.

=== Rail ===
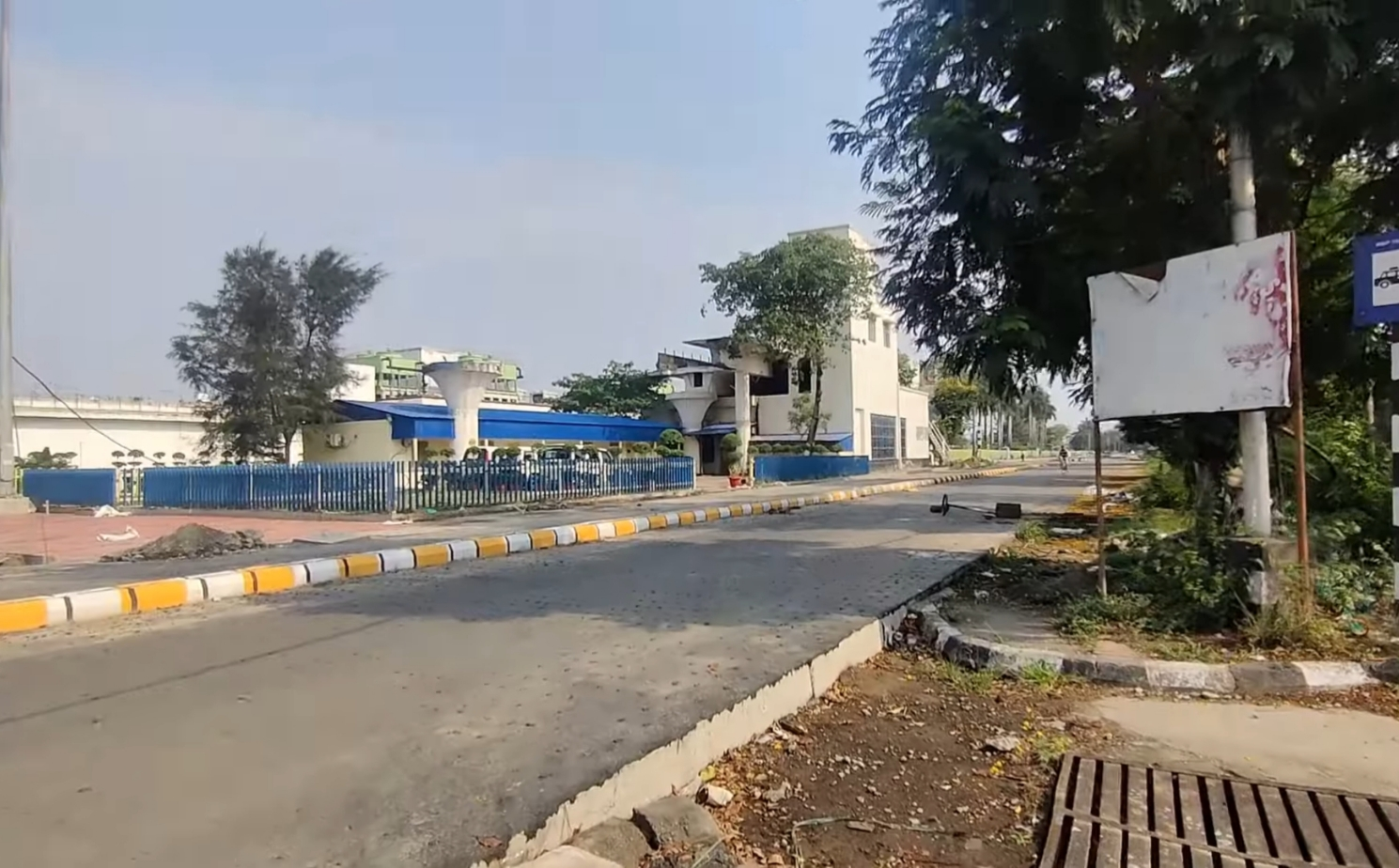
Biman Bandar railway station remants

The airport was connected to the Kolkata Suburban Railway system's circular line branch. The 4 kilometres (2.5 mi) long elevated track connected the airport Biman Bandar railway station with Dum Dum Cantonment railway station, passing Jessore Road. Electric multiple unit rolling stocks served the line. Due to poor patronage and plans to replace it with yellow Line metro service, the railway line was closed in September 2016 to facilitate construction of the new lines. The remaining infrastructure was dismantled in early 2020 to make space for road upgrades. As of 2024, the iconic station building still exists as Kolkata metro Railways headquarters.

Presently, the nearest railway stations are Dum Dum Cantonment railway station and Durganagar railway station.

== Awards ==
In 2014 and 2015, the airport won the title of Best Improved Airport in the Asia-Pacific region awarded by the Airport Council International. The airport was awarded the Best Airport by Hygiene Measures in the Asia-Pacific in 2020 by Airports Council International.

== Accidents and incidents ==
- On 2 May 1953, BOAC Flight 783 de Havilland Comet bound for Delhi crashed after takeoff from Calcutta Airport with the loss of 43 lives. Parts of the aircraft were found spread over an area of 8 km^{2}, near Jugalgari, a village some 25 miles north-west of Calcutta, suggesting disintegration before impact with the ground.
- On 12 June 1968, a Pan-Am Flight (N798PA, named Clipper Caribbean) Boeing 707-321C struck a tree 1128 m short of the runway during a night-time visual approach in rain. The aircraft subsequently crashed and caught fire. The fuselage remained largely intact, although the aircraft's landing gear broke off. Out of the 10 crew and 53 passengers aboard, one crew member and five passengers suffered fatal injuries due to the fire.

== See also ==
- Behala Airport
- Airports in India
- List of airports in West Bengal
- List of busiest airports in India by passenger traffic
