= Behala Airport =

Airport of West Bengal, India

Behala Airport Behala Flying Club
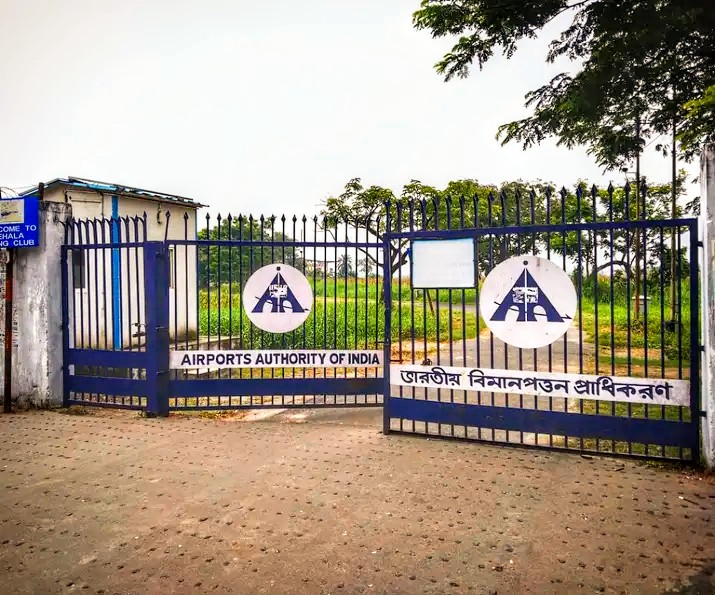
- IATA: none; ICAO: VEBA

Summary
- Airport type: Public
- Operator: Airports Authority of India
- Serves: Kolkata
- Location: Parnasree, Behala, Kolkata, India
- Elevation AMSL: 10 ft / 3 m
- Coordinates: 22°30′19.1″N 088°17′47.9″E

Map

Runways
Direction	Length		Surface
Direction	m	ft	Surface
18/36	1,066	3,500	Asphalt
- Currently not in operation, Only a flying school operates here

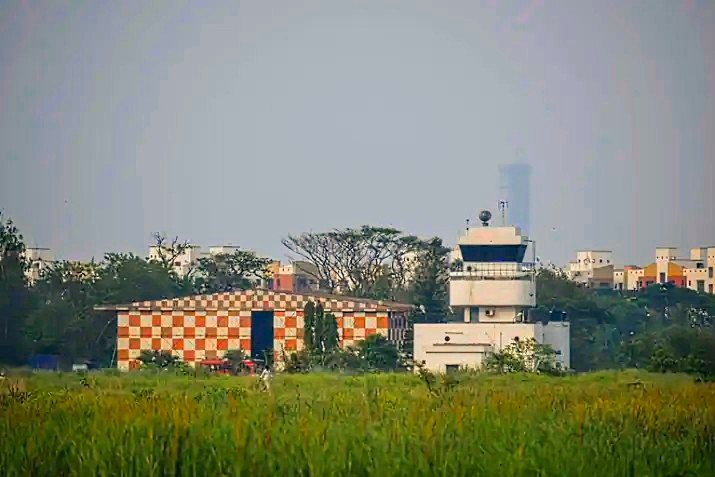
Airport from back side

Behala Airport (ICAO: VEBA) is located at Behala in the city of Kolkata, India. It is located approximately 8 kilometres (5.0 mi) from the city centre. It is more commonly called Behala Flying Training Institute or Behala Flying Club. The Ministry of Civil Aviation and the Airports Authority of India have plans to develop it into a full-fledged commercial airport by expanding the runway to 4,500 feet (1.4 km) to ease the pressure on the Netaji Subhash Chandra Bose International Airport.
