= Kazi Nazrul Islam Airport =

Domestic airport in Paschim Bardhaman, West Bengal, India

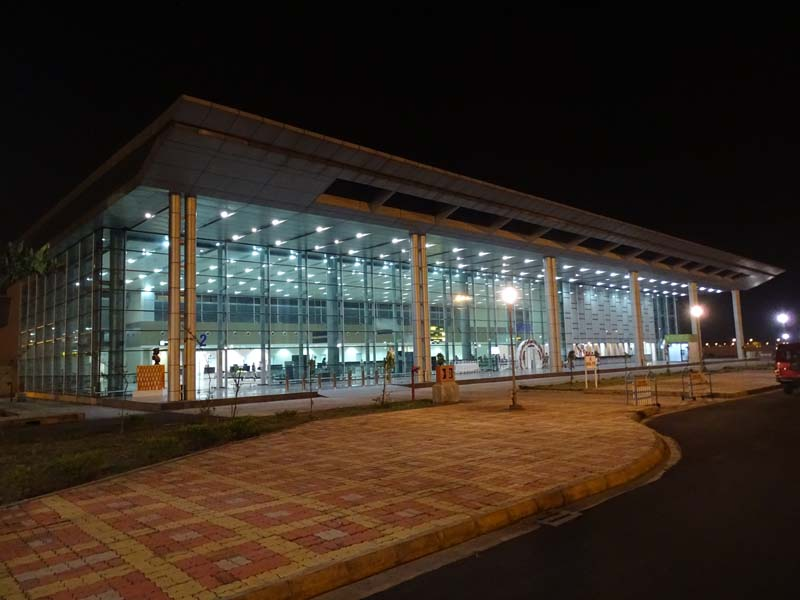
- IATA: RDP; ICAO: VEDG

Summary
- Airport type: Public
- Owner: Bengal Aerotropolis Projects Limited (BAPL): Government of West Bengal; Changi Airport Group
- Operator: Airports Authority of India
- Serves: Durgapur, Asansol
- Location: Andal, Durgapur, West Bengal, India
- Opened: 18 May 2015; 11 years ago
- Operating base for: IndiGo
- Elevation AMSL: 302 ft (92 m)
- Coordinates: 23°37′17″N 87°14′36″E
- Website: www.kniairport.com

Map
- Location in West Bengal RDP (India)

Runways
Direction	Length		Surface
Direction	m	ft	Surface
16/34	2,800	9,186	Asphalt

Statistics (April 2025 – March 2026)
- Passengers: 5,45,077(▲6.2%)
- Aircraft movements: 4,630(▲15.9%)
- Cargo tonnage: 1040.6 (▲241.97%)
- Source: AAI

Kazi Nazrul Islam Airport (IATA: RDP, ICAO: VEDG), (Note: Bengali pronunciation: [Kad͡ʒi nod͡ʒrul iʃlam bimanbɔndor]) also known as Durgapur Airport, is a domestic airport serving the cities of Durgapur and Asansol in West Bengal, India. It is located in the Andal region of Durgapur. It is named after the Bengali poet Kazi Nazrul Islam. The airport is roughly 17 km from Durgapur's city centre and 34 km from Asansol's City Bus Terminus.

The airport's hinterland comprises the cities of Durgapur, Asansol, Bardhaman, Bankura, Purulia, Bolpur in West Bengal and Jamtara, Dumka, Dhanbad and Bokaro in Jharkhand. It is part of the country's first private sector Aerotropolis, being developed by Bengal Aerotropolis Projects Limited (BAPL) in Andal, Durgapur. The airport was officially inaugurated on 19 September 2013 by the Chief Minister of West Bengal, Mamata Banerjee. According to 2023–24 data, the airport is the third busiest airport of West Bengal and the 58th busiest in India.

== History ==
=== Construction planning ===
Kazi Nazrul Islam statue in the Airport

The project was conceived in 2006–07 during the Left Front government. The construction of the airport was completed on 2013. For several reasons, the airport did not receive final operational clearance from the aviation regulator DGCA until 24 April 2015, following which regular commercial flights started.

=== Commencement of the airport ===
On 10 May 2015, Prime Minister Narendra Modi became the first passenger to use the new airport when he flew to Delhi aboard an Indian Air Force Boeing 737 VIP aircraft, even before commercial airlines started their regular service from the airport. Scheduled commercial operation commenced on 18 May 2015. Another airline, Zoom Air, also began flights on the Delhi – Durgapur – Kolkata route, but after three months the flight was stopped due to lack of passengers. The airport gained popularity in 2018 with connections to Delhi and Hyderabad by Air India and to Mumbai and Chennai in October 2019 by SpiceJet.

== Plan ==
The airport was built over 650 acres (which can be expanded in the future) at a cost of ₹600 crore (US$62 million). The airport has 70% open green space for facilitating a fresh green environment within the airport area.

== Future development ==
Sajjan Jindal-led JSW Group is planning to invest in the infrastructure development of Durgapur airport. A source close to the development said: "JSW Infra is likely to do some work in Durgapur Airport. It may be for development of the airport city along with managing the airport. There is a lot of scope in an airport city like developing IT park and other facilities."

== Ownership ==
The State Government also has a 26.05% stake through West Bengal Industrial Development Corporation. Singapore's Changi Airports International (CAI) has a 30.21% stake in BAPL. Other Indian promoters include IL&FS, Pragati Social Infrastructure & Development, Pragati 47, Lend Lease Company India and Citystar Infrastructure.

== Infrastructure ==
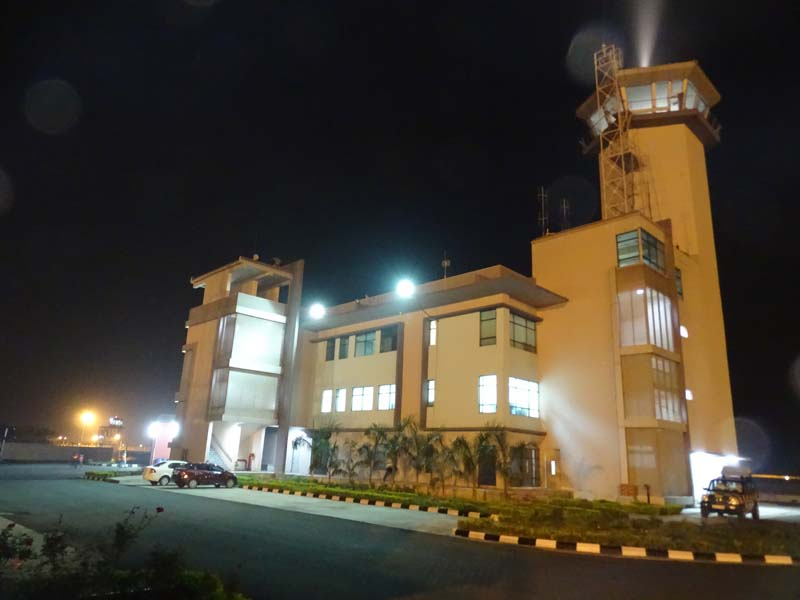
Air traffic control tower

=== Terminal ===
The 5,750 square metre passenger terminal building has a capacity of 1 million passengers per annum and can be expanded in the future to a capacity to 2.5 million per annum. It has six check-in counters with common use terminal equipment (CUTE) in the departure lounge and two baggage conveyor belts at the arrival hall. The airport is equipped with category VI firefighting and rescue capability. The terminal has ATMs, Wi-Fi services, a ticket booking counter, F & B outlets, and cab booking services.

=== Runway ===
The airport's 2,800-meter runway (which is expandable up to 3,315-metre) is equipped with a CAT I instrument landing system (ILS) and can handle narrow-body aircraft like Airbus A320 and Boeing 737. The airport apron has four parking bays and a helipad.

== Airlines and destinations ==
After inauguration, this airport had flights to Kolkata by Alliance Air, SpiceJet and Air India. However, the flight was discontinued after few months. Over the next few years, the airport gained connectivity to other major metro cities via IndiGo.

As of October 2026, the following airlines operates direct flights from the airport:

Airlines	Destinations
IndiGo	Bengaluru, Chennai, Delhi, Hyderabad, Mumbai–Shivaji

== Ground transport ==
=== Roads ===
The airport is conveniently connected to Durgapur by road. It is also connected to Raniganj and Asansol through National Highway 19.

== Statistics ==
Year	Passengers	Passengers % change	Aircraft movement	Aircraft movement % change
2025–2026	5,45,077	▲6.2%	4,630	▲15.9%
2024–2025	5,13,488	▼0.2%	3,996	▲23.6%
2023–2024	5,14,760	▲4.60%	3,234	▼0.5%
2022–2023	4,92,020	▲96.8%	3,344	▲73.6%
2021–2022	2,49,975	▲188.78%	1,926	▲200.94%
2020–2021	86,561	▼49.42%	640	▼57.97%
2019–2020	1,71,155	▲272.8%	1,523	▲239.2%
2018–2019	45,907	▲846.47%	385	▲63.1%
2017–2018	5,377	▼-6.9%	–	▲
2016–2017	5,950	▼-30.1%	236	▼-53.4%
2015–2016	8,515	–	506	–

=== Busiest routes ===
Busiest routes to and from Kazi Nazrul Islam Airport (to March 2024)
Rank	Airport	Total passengers	Change 2025/26
1	Chennai	17,490	1900
2	Mumbai	16,341	2300
3	Delhi	16,171	2600
4	Hyderabad	15,643	2500

== Accidents and incidents ==
On 1 May 2022, a SpiceJet Boeing 737–800 aircraft VT-SLH operating from Mumbai to Durgapur as SG-945, encountered severe turbulence while descending at Durgapur, injuring 14 passengers and three flight attendants out of 195 occupants (including two pilots and four flight attendants). A passenger, Akbar Ansari (48), died of a spinal injury five months later.

== See also ==
- Andal Aerotropolis
- Netaji Subhash Chandra Bose International Airport
- Airports in India
- List of airports in West Bengal
- List of busiest airports in India by passenger traffic
