= Air Force Station Salua =

- IATA: none; ICAO: none

Summary
- Airport type: Air Force Station
- Owner: Indian Air Force
- Location: Kharagpur, West Bengal
- Coordinates: 22°16′22″N 87°17′22″E

Map
- Location of the airport in West Bengal Salua AFS (India)

Air Force Station Salua is an Indian Air Force Station located in Kharagpur, located in the Paschim Medinipur district of West Bengal. It lies on the State Highway 5 at a distance of 7 km from IIT Kharagpur.

== History ==
It is a World War II air base, which was used by the 317th Airlift Squadron of the US Air Force, and was the first base of operations for the B-29 Superfortresses (units of the 58th Bomb Wing). The airstrip fell out of use after World War II but it is currently has a RADAR station. The nearest Airstrip is at Air Force Station Kalaikunda.

== Current status ==
Currently it is used as a radar station by the Indian Air Force.
