= Hyderabad State (1948–1956) =

Former state of India (1948-1956)

Coordinates: 17°00′N 78°50′E

- State of India
- 1948–1956
- Coat of arms

- Hyderabad in India (1951)
- Area
- History
  - Hyderabad State formed from Princely State of Hyderabad: 1948-09-17 1948
  - Reorganised and renamed as Andhra Pradesh: 1956-10-31 1956
Preceded by
Hyderabad State
Succeeded by
Andhra Pradesh (1956–2014)
Mysore State
Bombay State
- Today part of: Telangana; Maharashtra; Karnataka
- States of India since 1947

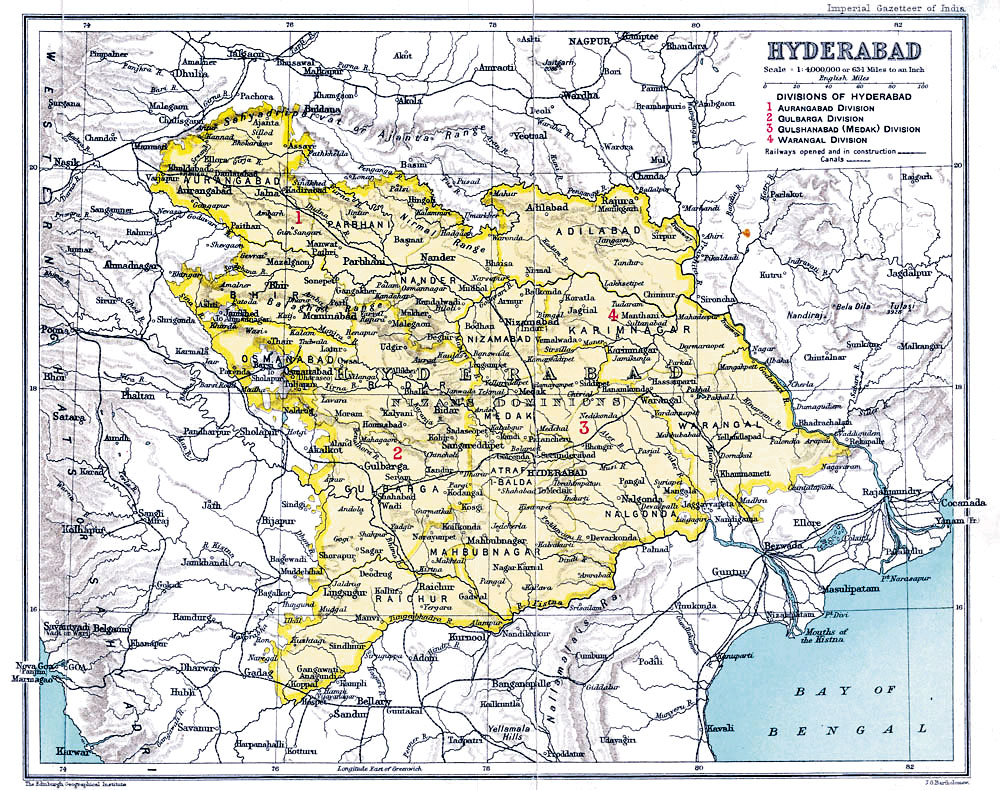
Hyderabad state until 1956

Hyderabad State was a state in the Dominion and later Republic of India, formed after the accession of the State of Hyderabad into the Union on 17 September 1948. It existed from 1948 to 1956. Hyderabad State comprised present day Telangana, Marathwada, and Hyderabad-Karnataka.

Following the States Reorganisation Act, which implemented a linguistic reorganisation of states, the Hyderabad state was dissolved. Its different regions were merged with Andhra State, Mysore State and Bombay State respectively.

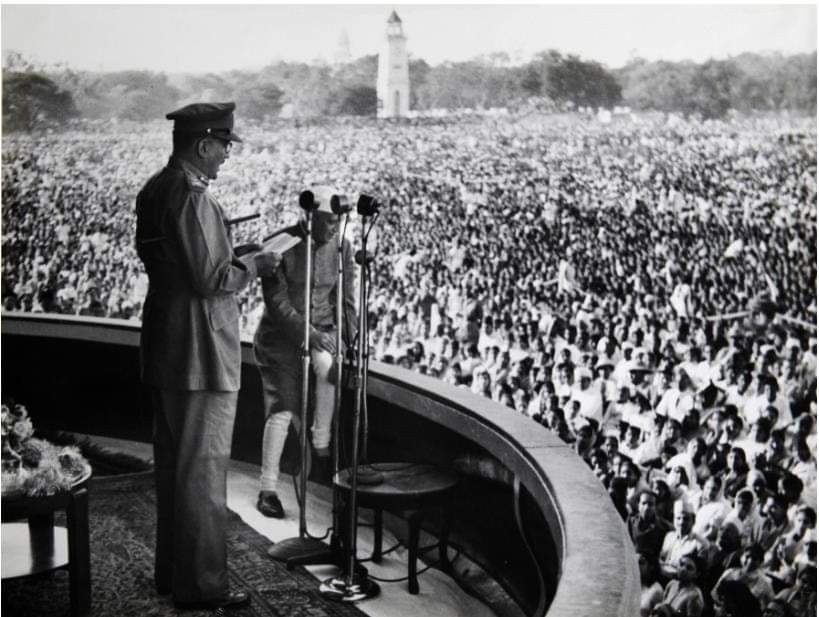
Major General Choudhary addressing crowds at Fateh Maidan as Nehru looks on

== Annexation ==
The annexation of Hyderabad (code-named Operation Polo) was a military operation launched in September 1948 that resulted in the annexation of the princely state of Hyderabad by India, which was dubbed a "police action".

At the time of partition of India in 1947, the princely states of India, who in principle had self-government within their territories, were subject to subsidiary alliances with the British, which gave control of external relations to the British. With the Indian Independence Act 1947, the British abandoned all such alliances, leaving the states with the theoretical option of opting for full independence. However, by 1948 almost all had acceded to either India or Pakistan. One major exception was that of the wealthiest and most powerful principality, Hyderabad, where the Nizam, Mir Osman Ali Khan, Asaf Jah VII, a Muslim ruler who presided over a largely Hindu population, chose independence and hoped to maintain this with an irregular army. The Nizam was also beset by the Telangana rebellion, which he was unable to crush.

In November 1947, Hyderabad signed a standstill agreement with the Dominion of India, continuing all previous arrangements except for the stationing of Indian troops in the state. India felt that the establishment of a Communist state in Hyderabad would be a threat to the country. The Razakars tried to ensure that Nizam's rule was maintained, however they proved unsuccessful. On 7 September 1948, Jawaharlal Nehru gave an ultimatum to the Nizam, demanding a ban of the Razakars and the return of Indian troops to Secunderabad. India invaded the state on 13 September 1948, following a crippling economic blockade and multiple attempts at destabilising the state through railway disruptions, the bombing of government buildings, and raids on border villages. After the defeat of the Razakars, the Nizam signed an instrument of accession, joining India.

The operation led to massive communal violence, at times perpetrated by the Indian Army. The Sunderlal Committee, appointed by Indian prime minister Jawaharlal Nehru, concluded that between 30,000 and 40,000 people had died in total in the state, in a report which was not released until 2013. Other responsible observers estimated the number of deaths to be 200,000 or higher.

Following the Nizam's forces surrender on 17 September 1948, a military government headed by Major General J. N. Chaudhuri who led Operation Polo was established. A firman was issued by the Nizam on 24 November 1949 wherein he accepted henceforth the Indian Constitution to be applicable to the State of Hyderabad. The Instrument of Accession was signed by the Nizam on 25 January 1950. Later the next day, as India became a Republic on 26 January, Nizam took over as the Raj Pramukh.

== Resolution at the United Nations ==
On 20 September 1948, during the 359th meeting of Security Council a representative from India informed that Nizam had instructed the representative of Hyderabad decided to withdraw the complaint from Security Council. On 22 September 1948 a cable sent by Nizam to Secretary General confirmed the same. The cable also stated that that Hyderabad delegation at United Nations ceased to have any authority to either represent Hyderabad or the Nizam. The Hyderabad delegation denied this, however on 24 September the delegation of Hyderabad confirmed the same and informed Security Council that Hyderabad State has surrendered and Government India had instructed Agents-General of Hyderabad to suspend all overseas activities.

== Government formation after Integration ==
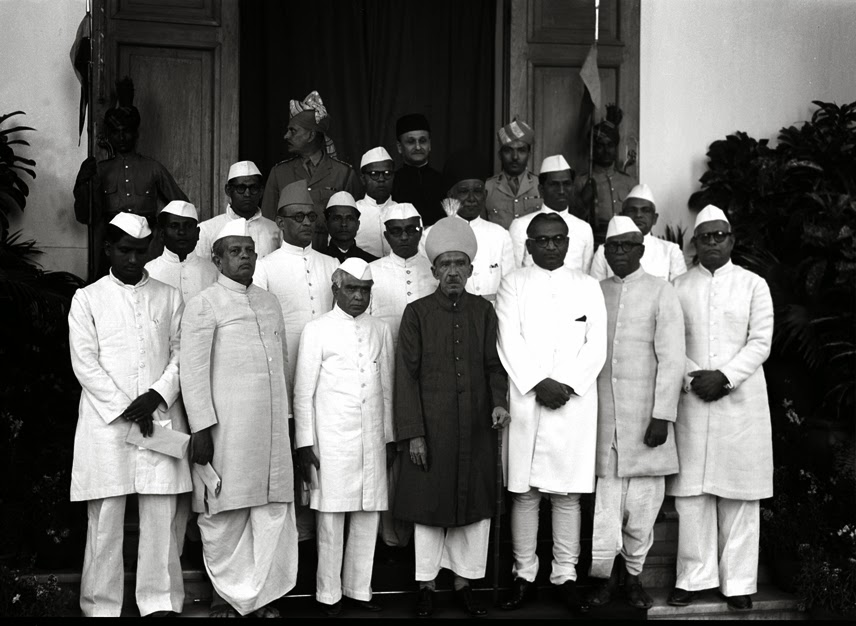
First cabinet of the Hyderabad State

A military government headed by Major General J. N. Chaudhuri who led Operation Polo was established. He stayed on as Military Governor till December 1949. On 1 December 1949, the military government was dissolved and a civilian government headed by M. K. Vellodi was formed in its place. Nizam signed the Instrument of Accession with the central government on 25 January 1950 thus formally completing the annexation formalities. On next day i.e. 26 January 1950, the last Nizam assumed his new role as the Raj Pramukh. In March 1952, Burgula Ramakrishna Rao became the second Chief Minister of Hyderabad State and the first democratically elected Chief Minister. The last Nizam Mir Osman Ali Khan continued in his role as the head of state as Rajpramukh till 1956 when Hyderabad State was split on linguistic basis and reorganised into three states and Hyderabad as a State ceased to exist.

The state witnessed Mulkhi agitation in 1952 by the locals after government jobs meant for the locals were given to non-locals.

No	Portrait	Name	Term of office		Duration	Office(s) held
1		Mir Osman Ali Khan	26 January 1950	31 October 1956	6 years, 279 days	Rajpramukh

No	Portrait	Name	Term of office		Duration	Office(s) held
1		Jayanto Nath Chaudhuri	17 September 1948	1 December 1949	1 year, 75 days	Military Governor of Hyderabad

No	Portrait	Name	Term of office		Duration	Office(s) held
1		M. K. Vellodi	1 December 1949	6 March 1952	2 years, 96 days	Chief Minister of Hyderabad

No	Portrait	Name	Term of office		Duration	Office(s) held
1		Burgula Ramakrishna Rao	6 March 1952	31 October 1956	4 years, 239 days	Chief Minister of Hyderabad

== Elections ==
In the first State Assembly election in India, 1952, Dr. Burgula Ramakrishna Rao was elected Chief Minister of Hyderabad State. During this time there were violent agitations by some Telanganites to send back bureaucrats from Madras state, and to strictly implement 'Mulki-rules' (Local jobs for locals only), which was part of Hyderabad state law since 1919.

== List of districts of Hyderabad State ==
Administratively, Hyderabad State was made up of sixteen districts, grouped into four divisions:.

Official name	Division	Map
Aurangabad	Aurangabad Division	
Beed	Aurangabad Division	
Nanded	Aurangabad Division	
Parbhani	Aurangabad Division	
Bidar	Gulbarga Division	
Gulbarga	Gulbarga Division	
Osmanabad	Gulbarga Division	
Raichur	Gulbarga Division	
Atraf-i-Balda	Gulshanabad (Medak) Division	
Mahbubnagar	Gulshanabad (Medak) Division	
Medak	Gulshanabad (Medak) Division	
Nalgonda	Gulshanabad (Medak) Division	
Nizamabad	Gulshanabad (Medak) Division	
Adilabad	Warangal Division	
Karimnagar	Warangal Division	
Warangal	Warangal Division	

== Reorganisation on linguistic basis ==
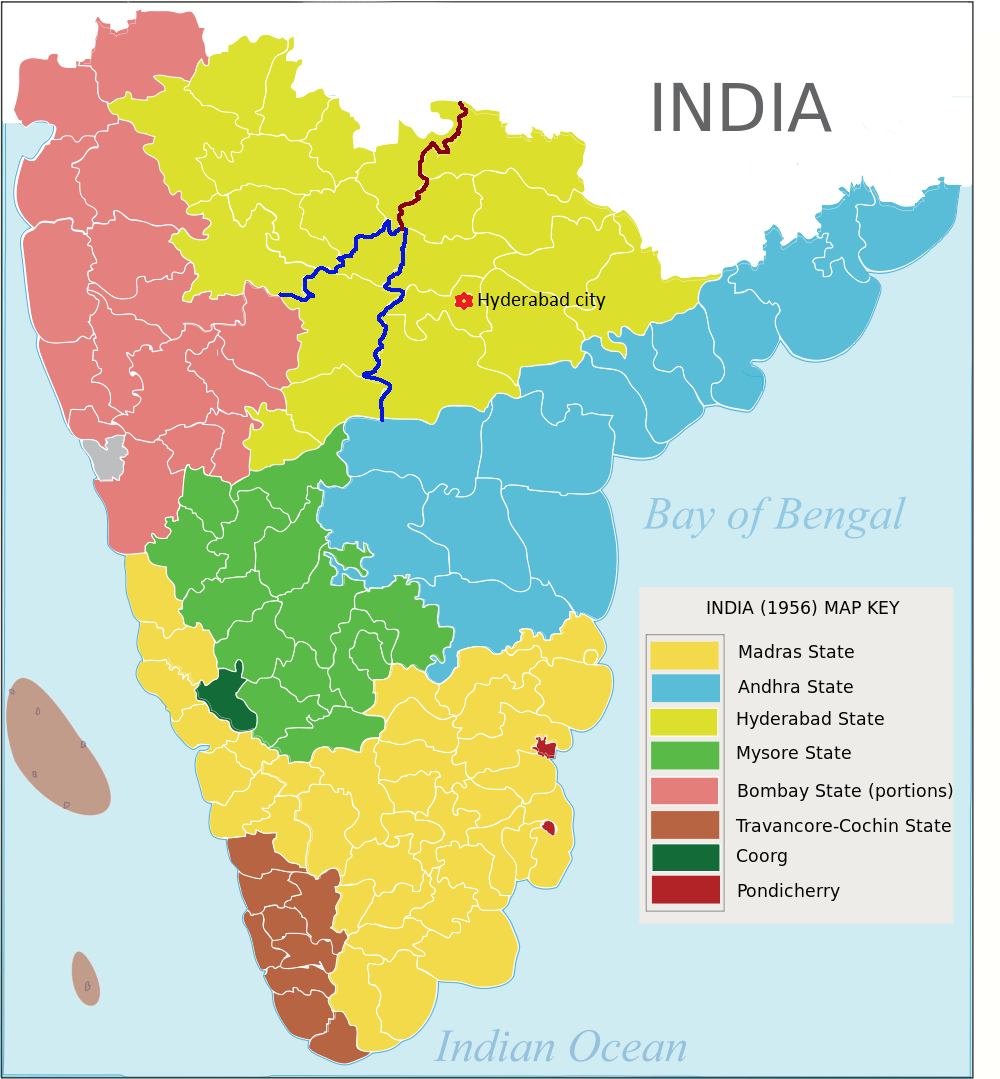
1956 map showing Hyderabad state in yellowish green. After the state reorganisation in 1956, regions west of the red and blue lines merged with Bombay and Mysore State respectively and the remaining part (Telangana) was merged with Andhra State to form Andhra Pradesh.

In 1956 during the reorganisation of the Indian states based along linguistic lines, the Telugu-speaking region of the state of Hyderabad State was merged with Andhra State. The Marathi speaking region was merged with Bombay State and Kannada speaking region with Mysore State.

The States Reorganisation Commission (SRC) was not in favour of an immediate merger of Telugu-speaking Telangana region of Hyderabad State with Andhra State, despite their common language. Para 378 of the SRC report said One of the principal causes of opposition of Vishalandhra also seems to be the apprehension felt by the educationally backward people of Telangana that they may be swamped and exploited by the more advanced people of the coastal areas.

Andhra and the Telugu speaking parts of Hyderabad State were merged to form Andhra Pradesh on 1 November 1956, after providing safeguards to Telangana in the form of Gentlemen's agreement. In June 2014, Andhra Pradesh was split and Telangana was created as a separate state. Hyderabad city remained as the joint capital of both Andhra Pradesh and Telangana for 10 years till 1 June 2024.

== Sources ==
- Chandra, Bipan; Mukherjee, Aditya; Mukherjee, Mridula (2008) [first published 1999], India Since Independence, Penguin Books India, ISBN 978-0-14-310409-4
- Noorani, A. G. (2014), The Destruction of Hyderabad, Hurst & Co, ISBN 978-1-84904-439-4
- Smith, Wilfred Cantwell (January 1950), "Hyderabad: Muslim Tragedy", Middle East Journal, 4 (1): 27–51, JSTOR 4322137
