= Indian annexation of Hyderabad =

1948 military invasion of Hyderabad State by the Dominion of India

Operation Polo
- Part of Telangana Rebellion and the Political integration of India
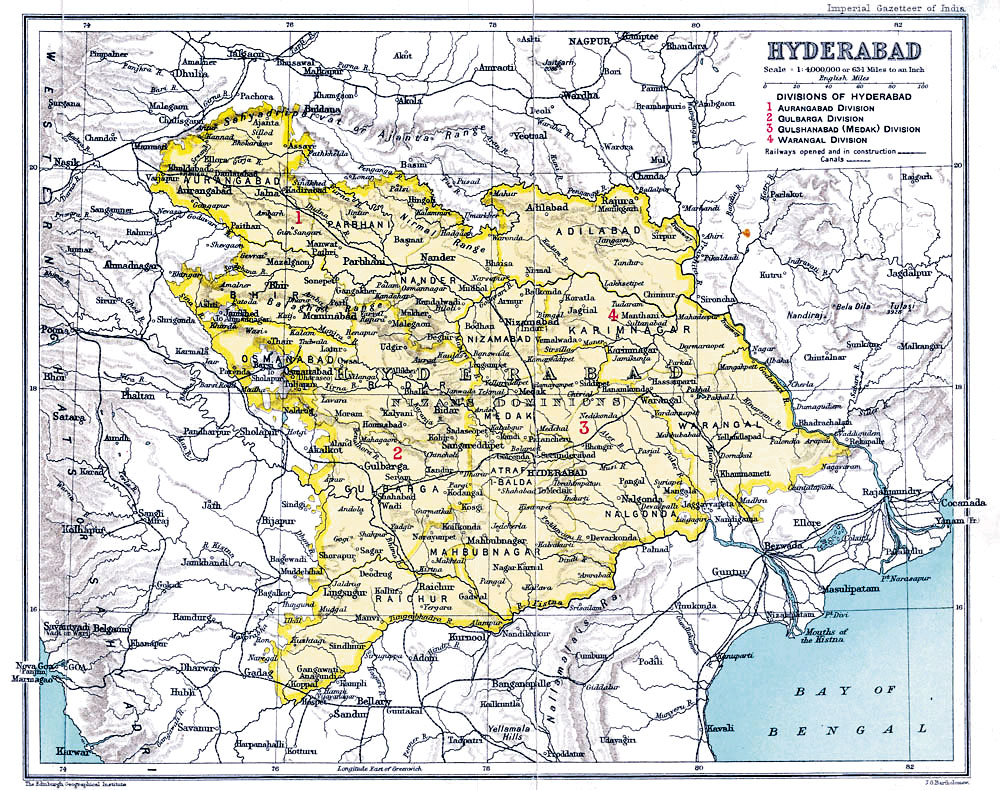
- The State of Hyderabad in 1909 (excluding Berar)
Date	13–18 September 1948 (5 days)
Location	Hyderabad State (parts of South and Western India) 17°00′N 78°50′E
Result	Indian victory
Territorial changes	Hyderabad annexed to the Union of India as a new Hyderabad State

Belligerents
Dominion of India	Hyderabad

Commanders and leaders
Jawaharlal Nehru; Vallabhbhai Patel; Rajendrasinhji Jadeja; Jayanto Nath Chaudhuri; Ajit Rudra; Roy Bucher; Subroto Mukerjee	Mir Osman Ali Khan; Mir Laiq Ali; S. A. El Edroos (surrendered); Qasim Razvi (surrendered)

Strength
35,000 Indian Armed Forces	22,000 Hyderabad State Forces; est. 200,000 irregulars (Razakars)

Casualties and losses
Less than 10 killed	Hyderabad State forces: 807 killed; unknown wounded; 1,647 POWs; Razakars: 1,373 killed; 1,911 captured
- Sunderlal Committee: 30,000–40,000 civilians killed; Responsible observers: 200,000 civilians killed

The annexation of Hyderabad (code-named Operation Polo) was a military operation launched in September 1948 that resulted in the annexation of the princely state of Hyderabad by India, which was dubbed a "police action".

At the time of partition of India in 1947, the princely states of India, who in principle had self-government within their territories, were subject to subsidiary alliances with the British, which gave control of external relations to the British. With the Indian Independence Act 1947, the British abandoned all such alliances, leaving the states with the theoretical option of opting for full independence. However, by 1948 almost all had acceded to either India or Pakistan. One major exception was that of the wealthiest and most powerful principality, Hyderabad, where the Nizam, Mir Osman Ali Khan, Asaf Jah VII, a Muslim ruler who presided over a largely Hindu population, chose independence and hoped to maintain this with an irregular army. The Nizam was also beset by the Telangana rebellion, which he was unable to crush.

In November 1947, Hyderabad signed a standstill agreement with the Dominion of India, continuing all previous arrangements except for the stationing of Indian troops in the state. India felt that the establishment of a Communist state in Hyderabad would be a threat to the country. The Razakars tried to ensure that Nizam's rule was maintained, however they proved unsuccessful. On 7 September 1948, Jawaharlal Nehru gave an ultimatum to the Nizam, demanding a ban of the Razakars and the return of Indian troops to Secunderabad. India invaded the state on 13 September 1948, following a crippling economic blockade and multiple attempts at destabilising the state through railway disruptions, the bombing of government buildings, and raids on border villages. After the defeat of the Razakars, the Nizam signed an instrument of accession, joining India.

The operation led to massive communal violence, at times perpetrated by the Indian Army. The Sunderlal Committee, appointed by Indian prime minister Jawaharlal Nehru, concluded that between 30,000 and 40,000 people had died in total in the state, in a report which was not released until 2013. Other responsible observers estimated the number of deaths to be 200,000 or higher.

== Background ==
After the Siege of Golconda by the Mughal Emperor Aurangzeb in 1687, the region was renamed as Deccan Subah (due to its geographical proximity in the Deccan Plateau) and in 1713 Qamar-ud-din Khan (later known as Asaf Jah I or Nizam I) was appointed its Subahdar and bestowed with the title of Nizam-ul-Mulk by the Mughal Emperor Farrukhsiyar. Hyderabad's nominal independence is dated to 1724, when the Nizam won a military victory over a rival military appointee. In 1798, Hyderabad became the first Indian princely state to accede to British protection under the policy of Subsidiary Alliance instituted by Richard Wellesley, and was thus named as the State of Hyderabad.

The State of Hyderabad under the leadership of its 7th Nizam, Mir Sir Osman Ali Khan, was the largest and most prosperous of all the princely states in India. With annual revenues of over Rs. 9 crore, it covered 82,698 square miles (214,190 km^{2}) of fairly homogeneous territory and comprised a population of roughly 16.34 million people (as per the 1941 census) of which a majority (85%) was Hindu. The state had its own army, airline, telecommunication system, railway network, postal system, currency and radio broadcasting service. Hyderabad was a multi-lingual state consisting of people speaking Telugu (48.2%), Marathi (26.4%), Kannada (12.3%) and Urdu (10.3%). Despite the overwhelming Hindu majority, Hindus were severely under-represented in government, police and the military. Of 1765 officers in the State Army, 1268 were Muslims, 421 were Hindus, and 121 others were Christians, Parsis and Sikhs. Of the officials drawing a salary between Rs. 600 and 1200 per month, 59 were Muslims, 5 were Hindus and 38 were of other religions. The Nizam and his nobles, who were mostly Muslims, owned 40% of the total land in the state.

When the British departed from the Indian subcontinent in 1947, they offered the various princely states in the subcontinent the option of acceding to either India or Pakistan or staying on as an independent state. As stated by Sardar Patel at a press conference in January 1948, "As you are all aware, on the lapse of Paramountcy every Indian State became a separate independent entity." In India, a small number of states, including Hyderabad, declined to join the new dominion. In the case of Pakistan, accession happened far more slowly. Hyderabad had been part of the calculations of all-India political parties since the 1930s. The leaders of the new Dominion of India were wary of a Balkanization of India if Hyderabad was left independent.

Hyderabad state had been steadily becoming more theocratic since the beginning of the 20th century. In 1926, Mahmud Nawazkhan, a retired Hyderabad official, founded the Majlis-e-Ittehadul Muslimeen (also known as Ittehad or MIM). Its objectives were to unite the Muslims in the State in support of Nizam and to reduce the Hindu majority by large-scale conversion to Islam. The MIM became a powerful communal organisation, with the principal focus to marginalise the political aspirations of the Hindus and moderate Muslims.

== Events preceding hostilities ==
=== Political and diplomatic negotiations ===
Mir Sir Osman Ali Khan, Nizam of Hyderabad, initially approached the British government with a request to take on the status of an independent constitutional monarchy within the Commonwealth of Nations. This request was, however, rejected by the last Viceroy of India, Louis Mountbatten, 1st Viscount Mountbatten of Burma.

At the time of the British withdrawal from India, the Nizam announced that he did not intend to join either new dominion, and proceeded to appoint trade representatives in European countries and to begin negotiations with the Portuguese, seeking to lease or buy Goa to provide his state with access to the sea.

B. R. Ambedkar, the Law Minister in the first independent Indian government considered the state of Hyderabad to be "a new problem which may turn out to be worse than the Hindu-Muslim problem as it is sure to result in the further Balkanisation of India". According to the writer A. G. Noorani, Indian Prime Minister Jawaharlal Nehru's concern was to defeat what he called Hyderabad's "secessionist venture", but he favoured talks and considered military option as a last resort. In Nehru's observation, the state of Hyderabad was "full of dangerous possibilities". Sardar Patel of the Indian National Congress, however, took a hard line, and had no patience with talks.

Accordingly, the Indian government offered Hyderabad a standstill agreement which made an assurance that the status quo would be maintained and no military action would be taken for one year. According to this agreement, India would handle Hyderabad's foreign affairs, but Indian Army troops stationed in Secunderabad would be removed. In Hyderabad city there was a huge demonstration by Razakars led by Syed Qasim Razvi in October 1947, against the administration's decision to sign the Standstill Agreement. This demonstration in front of the houses of the main negotiators, the Prime Minister, Muhammad Ahmad Said Khan Chhatari, Sir Walter Monckton, advisor to the Nizam, and Minister Nawab Ali Nawaz Jung, forced them to call off their Delhi visit to sign the agreement at that time.

Hyderabad violated all clauses of the agreement: in external affairs, by carrying out intrigues with Pakistan in defence, by building up a large semi-private army; in communications, by interfering with the traffic at the borders and the through traffic of Indian railways. India was also accused of violating the agreement by imposing an economic blockade. It turned out that Bombay State was interfering with supplies to Hyderabad without the knowledge of Delhi. The Government promised to take up the matter with the provincial governments, but scholar Lucien Benichou states that it was never done. There were also delays in arms shipments to Hyderabad from India.

Jawaharlal Nehru in a reception to the Bombay Union of Journalists on 26 April 1948 laid out his government's position:

If the safety of the people in Hyderabad was endangered by the activities of Razakars, the Government would intervene in Hyderabad State. The time had arrived when this hostility must cease. If the Hyderabad Government could not stop it, other measures would be adopted.

Muhammad Ali Jinnah reportedly warned the then Viceroy Lord Mountbatten, "If Congress attempted to exert any pressure on Hyderabad, every Muslim throughout the whole of India, yes, all the hundred million Muslims, would rise as one man to defend the oldest Muslim dynasty in India." According to Taylor C. Sherman, "India claimed that the government of Hyderabad was edging towards independence by divesting itself of its Indian securities, banning the Indian currency, halting the export of ground nuts, organising illegal gun-running from Pakistan, and inviting recruits to its army and its irregular forces, the Razakars." The Hyderabadi envoys accused India of setting up armed barricades on all land routes and of attempting to economically isolate their nation.

In the summer of 1948, Indian officials, especially Patel, signalled an intention to invade; Britain encouraged India to resolve the issue without the use of force but refused the Nizam's requests to help.

The Nizam also made unsuccessful attempts to seek the intervention of the United Nations.

=== Telangana Rebellion ===
In late 1945, there started a peasant uprising in the Telangana area, led by communists. The communists drew their support from various quarters. Among the poor peasants, there were grievances against the jagirdari system, which covered 43% of land holding. Initially, they also drew support from wealthier peasants who also fought under the communist banner, but by 1948, the coalition had disintegrated. According to the Indian Intelligence Bureau Deputy Director, the social and economic programs of the communists were "positive and in some cases great...The communists redistributed land and livestock, reduced rates, ended forced labour and increased wages by one hundred per cent. They inoculated the population and built public latrines; they encouraged women's organisations, discouraged sectarian sentiment and sought to abolish untouchability."

Initially, in 1945, the communists targeted zamindars and even the Deshmukhs, but soon they launched a full-fledged revolt against the Nizam. Starting in mid-1946, the conflict between the Razakars and the Communists became increasingly violent, with both sides resorting to increasingly brutal methods. According to an Indian government pamphlet, the communists had killed about 2,000 people by 1948.

=== Communal violence before the operation ===
In the 1936–37 Indian elections, the Muslim League under Muhammad Ali Jinnah had sought to harness Muslim aspirations and had won the adherence of MIM leader Nawab Bahadur Yar Jung, who campaigned for an Islamic State centred on the Nizam as the Sultan dismissing all claims for democracy. The Arya Samaj, a Hindu revivalist movement, had been demanding greater access to power for the Hindu majority since the late 1930s and was curbed by the Nizam in 1938. The Hyderabad State Congress joined forces with the Arya Samaj as well as the Hindu Mahasabha in the State.

Noorani regards the MIM under Nawab Bahadur Yar Jung as explicitly committed to safeguarding the rights of religious and linguistic minorities. However, this changed with the ascent of Qasim Razvi after the Nawab died in 1944.

Even as India and Hyderabad negotiated, most of the sub-continent had been thrown into chaos as a result of communal Hindu-Muslim riots pending the imminent partition of India. Fearing a Hindu civil uprising in his kingdom, the Nizam allowed Razvi to set up a voluntary militia of Muslims called the 'Razakars'. The Razakars – who numbered up to 200,000 at the height of the conflict – swore to uphold Islamic domination in Hyderabad and the Deccan plateau in the face of growing public opinion amongst the majority Hindu population favouring the accession of Hyderabad into the Indian Union.

According to an account by Mohammed Hyder, a civil servant in Osmanabad district, a variety of armed militant groups, including Razakars and Deendars and ethnic militias of Pathans and Arabs claimed to be defending the Islamic faith and made claims on the land. "From the beginning of 1948, the Razakars had extended their activities from Hyderabad city into the towns and rural areas, murdering Hindus, abducting women, pillaging houses and fields, and looting non-Muslim property in a widespread reign of terror." "Some women became victims of rape and kidnapping by Razakars. Thousands went to jail and braved the cruelties perpetuated by the oppressive administration. Due to the activities of the Razakars, thousands of Hindus had to flee from the state and take shelter in various camps". Some 400,000 people, mostly Hindus, fled to the states of Bombay, Mysore, Madras and Central Provinces. Some who went across the border into independent India and organised raids into Nizam's territory, which further escalated the violence. Many of these raiders were controlled by the Congress leadership in the Indian provinces and had links with extremist religious elements in the Hindutva fold. In all, more than 150 villages (of which 70 were in Indian territory outside Hyderabad State) were pushed into violence.

Hyder mediated some efforts to minimise the influence of the Razakars. Razvi, while generally receptive, vetoed the option of disarming them, saying that with the Hyderabad state army ineffective, the Razakars were the only means of self-defence available. By the end of August 1948, a full-blown invasion by India was imminent.

=== Hyderabadi military preparations ===
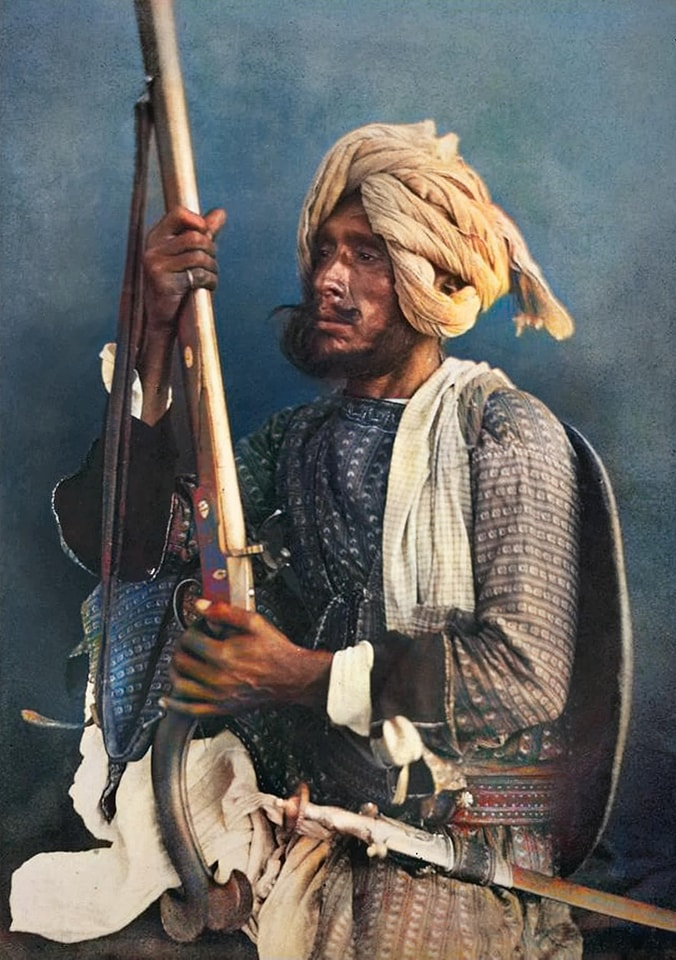
Portrait of a Rohilla warrior in service of the Hyderabad Nizam

The Nizam was in a weak position as his army numbered only 24,000 men, of whom only some 6,000 were fully trained and equipped. These included Arabs, Rohillas, North Indian Muslims and Pathans. The State Army consisted of three armoured regiments, a horse cavalry regiment, 11 infantry battalions and artillery. These were supplemented by irregular units with horse cavalry, four infantry battalions (termed as the Saraf-e-khas, paigah, Arab and Refugee) and a garrison battalion. This army was commanded by Major General El Edroos, an Arab. 55 per cent of the Hyderabadi army was composed of Muslims, with 1,268 Muslims in a total of 1,765 officers as of 1941.

In addition to these, there were about 200,000 irregular militia called the Razakars under the command of a civilian leader Kasim Razvi. A quarter of these were armed with modern small firearms, while the rest were predominantly armed with muzzle-loaders and swords.

=== Skirmish at Kodad ===
On 6 September an Indian police post near Chillakallu village came under heavy fire from Razakar units. The Indian Army command sent a squadron of The Poona Horse led by Abhey Singh and a company of 2/5 Gurkha Rifles to investigate who were also fired upon by the Razakars. The tanks of the Poona Horse then chased the Razakars to Kodad, in Hyderabad territory. Here they were opposed by the armoured cars of 1st Hyderabad Lancers. In a brief action, the Poona Horse destroyed one armoured car and forced the surrender of the state garrison at Kodad.

=== Indian military preparations ===
On receiving directions from the government to seize and annex Hyderabad, the Indian Army came up with the Goddard Plan (laid out by Lt. Gen. E. N. Goddard, the Commander-in-Chief of the Southern Command). The plan envisaged two main thrusts – from Vijayawada in the East and Solapur in the West – while smaller units pinned down the Hyderabadi army along the border. Overall command was placed in the hands of Lt. Gen. Rajendrasinghji.

The attack from Solapur was led by Major General Jayanto Nath Chaudhuri and was composed of four task forces:

1. Strike Force comprising a mix of fast-moving infantry, cavalry and light artillery,
2. Smash Force consisting of predominantly armoured units and artillery,
3. Kill Force composed of infantry and engineering units,
4. Vir Force which comprised infantry, anti-tank and engineering units.

The attack from Vijayawada was led by Major General Ajit Rudra and comprised the 2/5 Gurkha Rifles, one squadron of the 17th (Poona) Horse, and a troop from the 19th Field Battery along with engineering and ancillary units. In addition, four infantry battalions were to neutralise and protect lines of communication. Two squadrons of Hawker Tempest aircraft were prepared for air support from the Pune base.

Nehru, in a letter to V. K. Krishna Menon dated to 29 August 1948, wrote that "I am convinced that it is impossible to arrive at any solution of the Hyderabad problem by settlement or peaceful negotiation. Military action becomes essential, we call it as you have called it Police Action." It was also believed that there could be a possible military response by Pakistan.Time magazine pointed out that if India invaded Hyderabad, Razakars would massacre Hindus, which would lead to retaliatory massacres of Muslims across India. On September 7, Jawaharlal Nehru gave ultimatum to the Nizam, demanding a ban on the Razakars and the return of Indian troops to Secunderabad. Pakistani foreign minister Muhammad Zafarullah Khan warned India against this ultimatum. Nehru then launched the invasion on 13 September, after the death of Jinnah on 11 September.

== Commencement of hostilities ==
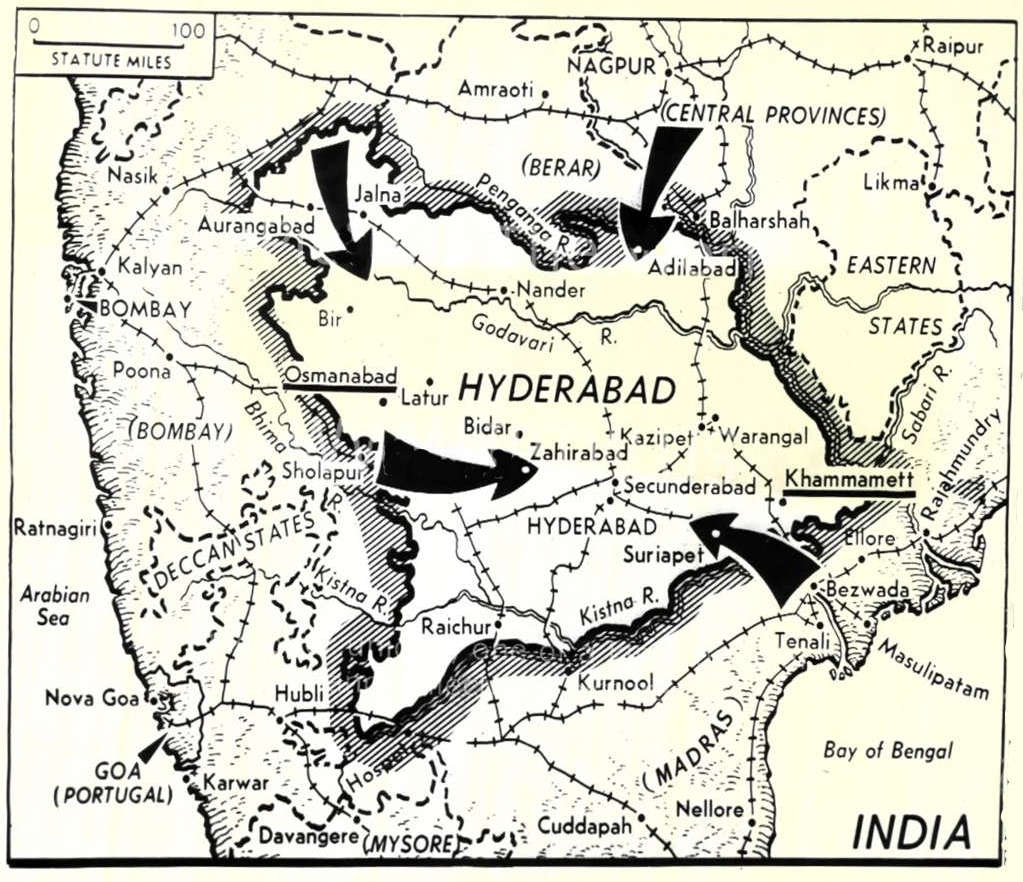
Indian Army movements during the Operation Polo

=== Day 1, 13 September ===
Indian forces entered the state at 4 a.m. The first battle was fought at Naldurg Fort on the Solapur Secunderabad Highway between a defending force of the 1st Hyderabad Infantry and the attacking force of the 7th Brigade. Using speed and surprise, the 7th Brigade managed to secure a vital bridge on the Bori River intact, following which an assault was made on the Hyderabadi positions at Naldurg by the 2nd Sikh Regiment. The bridge and road secured, an armoured column of the 1st Armoured Brigade – part of the Smash force – moved into the town of Jalkot, 8 km from Naldurg, at 0900 hours, paving the way for the Strike Force units under Lt. Col Ram Singh Commanding Officer of 9 Dogra (a motorised battalion) to pass through. This armoured column reached the town of Umarga, 61 km inside Hyderabad by 1515 hours, where it quickly overpowered resistance from Razakar units defending the town. Meanwhile, another column consisting of a squadron of 3rd Cavalry, a troop from 18th King Edward's Own Cavalry, a troop from 9 Para Field Regiment, 10 Field Company Engineers, 3/2 Punjab Regiment, 2/1 Gurkha Rifles, 1 Mewar Infantry, and ancillary units attacked the town of Tuljapur, about 34 km north-west of Naldurg. They reached Tuljapur at dawn, where they encountered resistance from a unit of the 1st Hyderabad Infantry and about 200 Razakars who fought for two hours before surrendering. Further advance towards the town of Lohara was stalled as the river had swollen. The first day on the Western Front ended with the Indians inflicting heavy casualties on the Hyderabadis and capturing large tracts of territory. Amongst the captured defenders was a British mercenary who had been tasked with blowing up the bridge near Naldurg.

In the East, forces led by Lt. Gen A.A. Rudra met with fierce resistance from two armoured car cavalry units of the Hyderabad State Forces, equipped with Humber armoured cars and Staghounds, namely the 2nd and 4th Hyderabad Lancers, but managed to reach the town of Kodar by 0830 hours. Pressing on, the force reached Munagala by the afternoon.

There were further incidents in Hospet – where the 1st Mysore assaulted and secured a sugar factory from units of Razakars and Pathans – and at Tungabhadra – where the 5/5 Gurkha attacked and secured a vital bridge from the Hyderabadi army.

=== Day 2, 14 September ===
The force that had camped at Umarga proceeded to the town of Rajeshwar, 48 km east. As aerial reconnaissance had shown well-entrenched ambush positions set up along the way, the air strikes from squadrons of Tempests were called in. These air strikes effectively cleared the route and allowed the land forces to reach and secure Rajeshwar by the afternoon.

The assault force from the East was meanwhile slowed by an anti-tank ditch and later came under heavy fire from hillside positions of the 1st Lancers and 5th Infantry 6 km from Suryapet. The positions were assaulted by the 2/5 Gurkha – veterans of the Burma Campaign – and were neutralised, with the Hyderabadis taking severe casualties.

At the same time, the 3/11 Gurkha Rifles and a squadron of 8th Cavalry attacked Osmanabad and took the town after heavy street combat with the Razakars who determinedly resisted the Indians.

A force under the command of Maj. Gen. D.S. Brar was tasked with capturing the city of Aurangabad. The city was attacked by six columns of infantry and cavalry, resulting in the civil administration emerging in the afternoon and offering a surrender to the Indians.

There were further incidents in Jalna where 3 Sikhs, a company of 2 Jodhpur infantry and some tanks from 18 Cavalry faced stubborn resistance from Hyderabadi forces.

=== Day 3, 15 September ===
Leaving a company of 3/11 Gurkhas to occupy the town of Jalna, the remainder of the force moved to Latur, and later to Mominabad where they faced action against the 3 Golconda Lancers who gave token resistance before surrendering.

At the town of Suryapet, air strikes cleared most of the Hyderabadi defences, although some Razakar units still gave resistance to the 2/5 Gurkhas who occupied the town. The retreating Hyderabadi forces destroyed the bridge at Musi to delay the Indians but failed to offer covering fire, allowing the bridge to be quickly repaired. Another incident occurred at Narkatpalli where a Razakar unit was decimated by the Indians.

=== Day 4, 16 September ===
The task force under Lt. Col. Ram Singh moved towards Zahirabad at dawn but was slowed by a minefield, which had to be cleared. On reaching the junction of the Bidar road with the Solapur-Hyderabad City Highway, the forces encountered gunfire from ambush positions. However, leaving some of the units to handle the ambush, the bulk of the force moved on to reach 15 kilometres beyond Zahirabad by nightfall despite sporadic resistance along the way. Most of the resistance was from Razakar units who ambushed the Indians as they passed through urban areas. The Razakars were able to use the terrain to their advantage until the Indians brought in their 75 mm guns.

=== Day 5, 17 September ===
In the early hours of 17 September, the Indian army entered Bidar. Meanwhile, forces led by the 1st Armoured regiment were at the town of Chityal about 60 km from Hyderabad, while another column took over the town of Hingoli. By the morning of the 5th day of hostilities, it had become clear that the Hyderabad army and the Razakars had been routed on all fronts and with extremely heavy casualties. At 5 pm on 17 September, the Nizam announced a ceasefire, thus ending the armed action.

== Hyderabad at the United Nations ==
The Government of Hyderabad, on 21 August 1948 informed the Security Council that a "grave dispute which had arisen between Hyderabad and India" be brought to its attention. Later on 12 September reported first the "threat of invasion, and then an actual invasion by India". The issue was admitted to the agenda of the Security Council at its 357th meeting, held at Paris on 16 September 1948. The Nizam deputed five men to represent Hyderabad at the United Nations. These five were Moin Nawaz Jung, Muhammad Hamidullah, Yousuf Hussain Khan, Zaheer Ahmad and Pingle Venkatram Reddy. The representative of Hyderabad stated that Hyderabad had obtained full independence on 15 August 1947 when British suzerainty over the territory ended. Hyderabad representatives expressed a willingness to hold a plebiscite under the supervision of the United Nations. They asked the council to use its powers to halt the invasion and ask India to withdraw its troops. The representative of India maintained that Hyderabad was not competent to bring any question before the Security Council as it was neither a State nor independent. India also informed the Security Council the reign of terror by private armies in Hyderabad, and other events which, he said, had obliged the Government of India to take action.

On September 20, 1948s, during the 359th meeting of Security Council a representative from India informed that the Nizam had instructed the representative of Hyderabad to withdraw the complaint from Security Council. On 22 September 1948 a cable sent by the Nizam to Secretary General confirmed the same. The cable also stated that that Hyderabad delegation at the United Nations ceased to have any authority to either represent Hyderabad or the Nizam. The Hyderabad delegation denied this; however, on 24 September the delegation of Hyderabad confirmed the same and informed the Security Council that Hyderabad State had surrendered and the Government of India had instructed Agents-General of Hyderabad to suspend all overseas activities. In December 1948, Moin Nawaz Jung once again approached the Security Council claiming that the Nizam had given instructions to withdraw the complaint under duress.

Out of the five men who represented Hyderabad at United Nations, Moin Nawaz Jung and Muhammed Hameedullah never returned to India. Yousuf Hussain Khan quit his job at Osmania University and moved to Aligarh Muslim University. Zaheer Ahmed joined Government of India and later received important postings in Foreign Services. However Pingle Venkatram Reddy was arrested on his return and interned in Chanchalguda Jail and later was put under house arrest.

== Capitulation and surrender ==
=== Consultations with Indian envoy ===
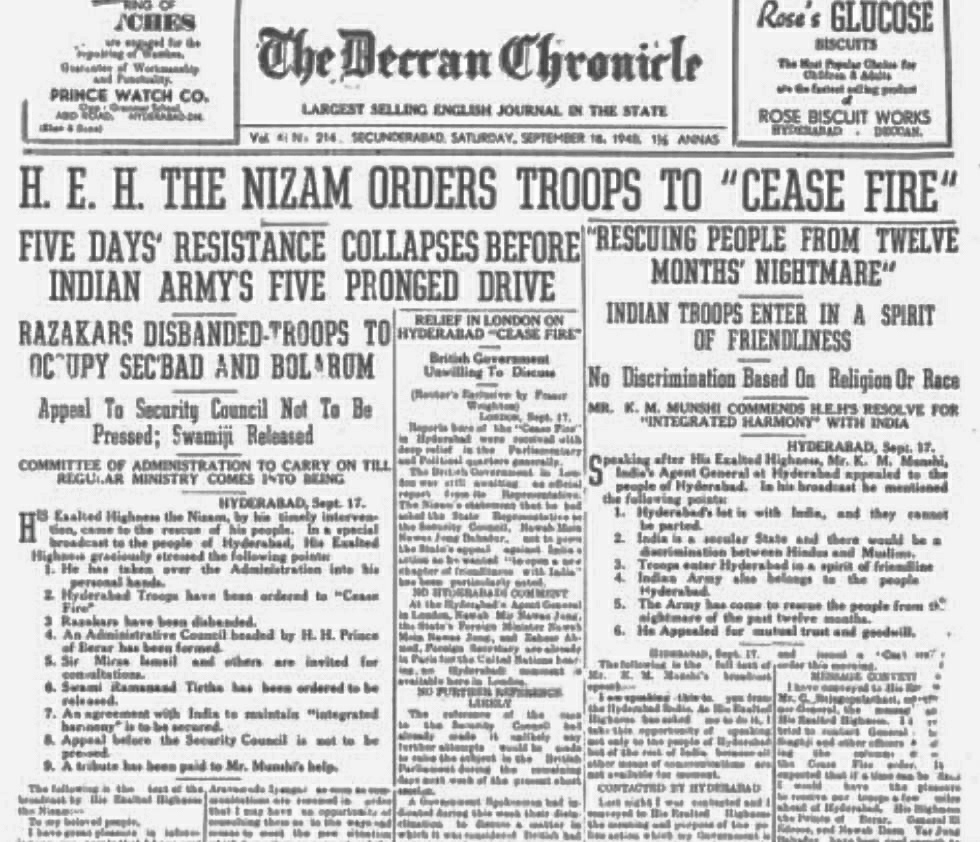
The first page of Deccan Chronicle that was published on 18 September 1948

On 16 September, faced with imminent defeat, Nizam Mir Sir Osman Ali Khan summoned his Prime Minister, Mir Laiq Ali, and requested his resignation by the morning of the following day. The resignation was delivered along with the resignations of the entire cabinet. On the noon of 17 September, a messenger brought a personal note from the Nizam to India's Agent General to Hyderabad, K. M. Munshi, summoning him to the Nizam's office at 1600 hours. At the meeting, the Nizam stated "The vultures have resigned. I don't know what to do". Munshi advised the Nizam to secure the safety of the citizens of Hyderabad by issuing appropriate orders to the Commander of the Hyderabad State Army, Major-General Syed Ahmed El Edroos. This was immediately done.

=== Broadcast by Nehru ===
On 18 September, Jawaharlal Nehru in his broadcast said on the military action:

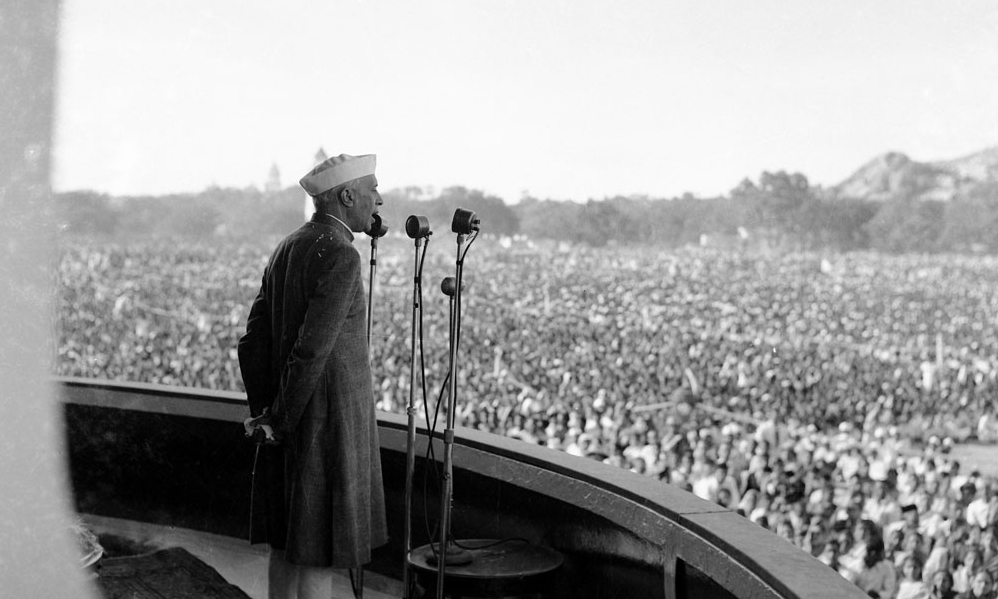
Jawaharlal Nehru addressing crowds at Fateh Maidan after the integration

It is natural that we should rejoice at this swift termination of the action we undertook after prolonged and painful thought and each deliberation. As I have repeatedly said we are men of peace, hating war and the last thing we desire is to come into an armed conflict with anyone. Nevertheless, circumstances which you will know well, compelled us to take this action in Hyderabad. Fortunately, it was brief and we return with relief to the paths of peace again.

=== Radio broadcast by the Nizam ===
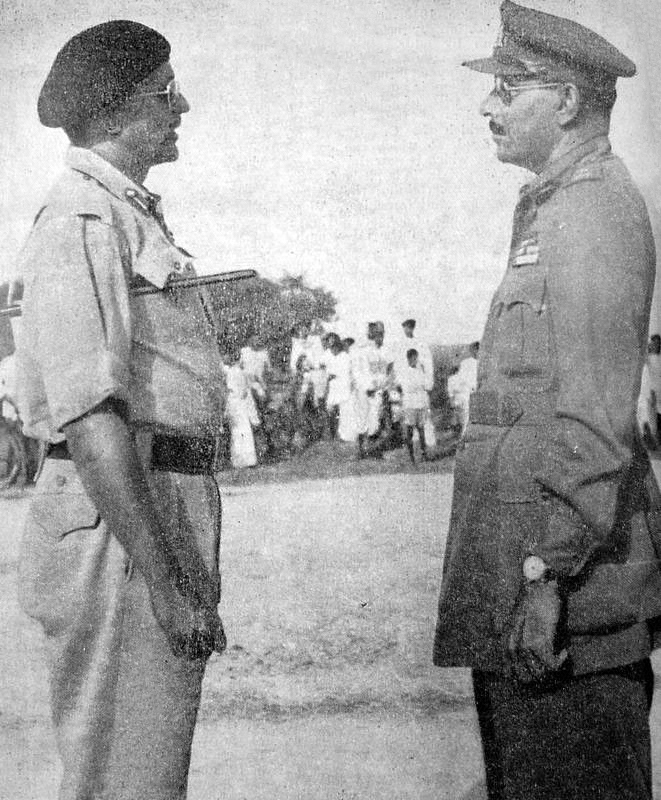
Major General Syed Ahmed El Edroos (at right) offers his surrender of the Hyderabad State Forces to Major General (later General and Army Chief) Joyanto Nath Chaudhuri at Secunderabad.

It was Nizam Mir Sir Osman Ali Khan's first visit to the radio station. The Nizam of Hyderabad, in his radio speech on 23 September 1948, said "In November last [1947], a small group which had organised a quasi-military organisation surrounded the homes of my Prime Minister, the Nawab of Chhatari, in whose wisdom I had complete confidence, and of Sir Walter Monkton, my constitutional Adviser, by duress compelled the Nawab and other trusted ministers to resign and forced the Laik Ali Ministry on me. This group headed by Kasim Razvi had no stake in the country or any record of service behind it. By methods reminiscent of Hitlerite Germany it took possession of the State, spread terror ... and rendered me completely helpless."

=== The surrender ceremony ===
According to the records maintained by the Indian Army, General Chaudhari led an armoured column into Hyderabad at around 4 p.m. on 18 September and the Hyderabad army, led by Major General El Edroos, surrendered.

== Communal violence during and after the operation ==
There were reports of looting, mass murder and rape of Muslims in reprisals by Hyderabadi Hindus. Jawaharlal Nehru appointed a mixed-faith committee led by Pandit Sunder Lal to investigate the situation. The findings of the report (Pandit Sunderlal Committee Report) were not made public until 2013 when it was accessed from the Nehru Memorial Museum and Library in New Delhi.

The Committee concluded that while Muslim villagers were disarmed by the Indian Army, Hindus were often left with their weapons. The violence was carried out by Hindu residents, with the army sometimes indifferent, and sometimes participating in the atrocities. The Committee stated that large-scale violence against Muslims occurred in Marathwada and Telangana areas. It also concluded: "At several places, members of the armed forces brought out Muslim adult males from villages and towns and massacred them in cold blood." The Committee generally credited the military officers with good conduct but stated that soldiers acted out of bigotry. The official "very conservative estimate" was that 27,000 to 40,000 died "during and after the police action." Other scholars have put the figure at 200,000, or even higher. Among Muslims some estimates were even higher and Smith says that the military government's private low estimates [of Muslim casualties] were at least ten times the number of murders with which the Razakars were officially accused.

Patel reacted angrily to the report and disowned its conclusions. He stated that the terms of reference were flawed because they only covered the part during and after the operation. He also cast aspersions on the motives and standing of the committee. These objections are regarded by Noorani as disingenuous because the commission was an official one, and it was critical of the Razakars as well.

According to Mohammed Hyder, the tragic consequences of the Indian operation were largely preventable. He faulted the Indian Army for neither restoring local administration nor setting up their military administration. As a result, the anarchy led to several thousand "thugs", from the camps set up across the border, filling the vacuum. He stated "Thousands of families were broken up, children separated from their parents and wives, from their husbands. Women and girls were hunted down and raped."

== Hyderabad after integration ==
=== Detentions and release of people involved ===
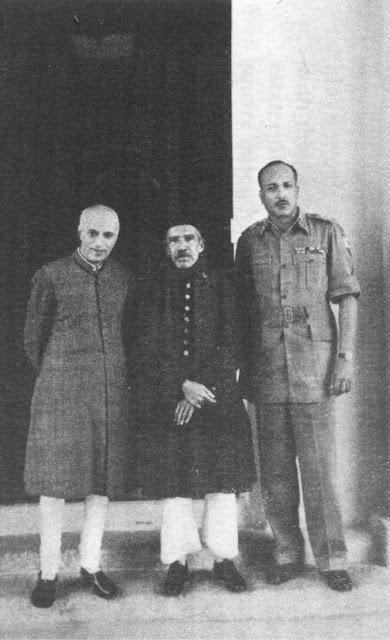
(From left to right): Prime Minister Jawaharlal Nehru, Nizam Mir Sir Osman Ali Khan, and Jayanto Nath Chaudhuri after Hyderabad's accession to the Dominion of India

The Indian military detained thousands of people during the operation, including Razakars, Hindu militants, and communists. This was largely done based on local informants, who used this opportunity to settle scores. The estimated number of people detained was close to 18,000, which resulted in overcrowded jails and a paralysed criminal system.

The Indian government set up Special Tribunals to prosecute these. These strongly resembled the colonial governments earlier, and there were many legal irregularities, including denial or inability to access lawyers and delayed trials – about which the Red Cross was pressuring Nehru.

The viewpoint of the government was: "In political physics, Razakar action and Hindu reaction have been almost equal and opposite." A quiet decision was taken to release all Hindus and for a review of all Muslim cases, aiming to let many of them out. Regarding atrocities by Muslims, Nehru considered the actions during the operation as "madness" seizing "decent people", analogous to experience elsewhere during the partition of India. Nehru was also concerned that disenfranchised Muslims would join the communists.

The government was under pressure to not prosecute participants in communal violence, which often made communal relations worse. Patel had also died in 1950. Thus, by 1953 the Indian government released all but a few persons.

=== Overhaul of bureaucracy ===
Junior officers from neighbouring Bombay, CP and Madras regions were appointed to replace the vacancies. They were unable to speak the language and were unfamiliar with local conditions. Nehru objected to this "communal chauvinism" and called them "incompetent outsiders", and tried to impose Hyderabadi residency requirements: however, this was circumvented by using forged documents.

== See also ==
- Indian Armed Forces
- Hyderabad State Army
- Hyderabad State (1948–1956)

== Bibliography ==
- Benichou, Lucien D. (2000), From Autocracy to Integration: Political Developments in Hyderabad State, 1938–1948, Orient Blackswan, ISBN 978-81-250-1847-6
- Chandra, Bipan; Mukherjee, Aditya; Mukherjee, Mridula (2008) [first published 1999], India Since Independence, Penguin Books India, ISBN 978-0-14-310409-4
- Hyder, Mohammed (2012), October Coup, A Memoir of the Struggle for Hyderabad, Roli Books, ISBN 978-8174368508
- Hodson, H. V. (1969), The Great Divide: Britain, India, Pakistan, London: Hutchinson, ISBN 978-0090971503
- Menon, V. P. (1956), The Story of Integration of the Indian States (PDF), Orient Longman
- Muralidharan, Sukumar (2014). "Alternate Histories: Hyderabad 1948 Compels a Fresh Evaluation of the Theology of India's Independence and Partition". History and Sociology of South Asia. 8 (2): 119–138. doi:10.1177/2230807514524091. S2CID 153722788.
- Noorani, A. G. (2014), The Destruction of Hyderabad, Hurst & Co, ISBN 978-1-84904-439-4
- Raghavan, Srinath (2010), War and Peace in Modern India, Palgrave Macmillan, ISBN 978-1-137-00737-7
- Smith, Wilfred Cantwell (January 1950), "Hyderabad: Muslim Tragedy", Middle East Journal, 4 (1): 27–51, JSTOR 4322137
- Zubrzycki, John (2006), The Last Nizam: An Indian Prince in the Australian Outback, Australia: Pan Macmillan, ISBN 978-0-330-42321-2
