= D. K. Basaveshwar =

Indian politician and trade unionist

Dundur Kalameshwar Basaveshwar was an Indian politician and trade unionist. He was born in 1898. He served as a King's Commissioned Indian Officer during the First World War. He joined the trade union movement in 1932. He served as chairman of the Taluka Co-operative Supervising Union, as well as chairing the Industrial Association and other groups. He was active in the civil disobedience movement of 1940-1941 and joined the 1942 Quit India struggle. He was elected to the Bombay Legislative Assembly in the 1946 election. In 1947 was named District Commandant of the Home Guards Organisation in the Dharwar District. He was re-elected to the Bombay Legislative Assembly, standing as the Indian National Congress candidate for the unreserved seat of the Hubli constituency, in the 1952 election. Basaveshwar was a disciple of Shri Aurobindo.

Basaveshwar died before the end of the tenure of the Legislative Assembly, the independent candidate K.A. Shiddappa was elected to fill his seat in a by-election.
