= Ahmed Muhdar Al-Aydarus =

Commander in chief of the Nizams Army

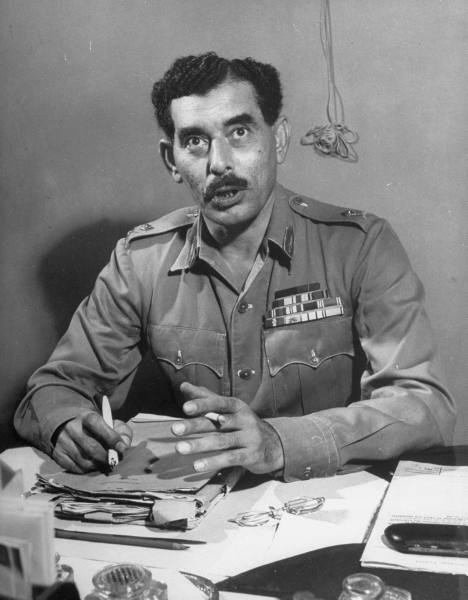
- Syed Ahmed Al-Aydarus in army atire
- Born: 3 March 1899; Sangareddy, Hyderabad State, British Raj
- Died: 20 July 1962 (aged 63); Bangalore, Mysore State, India
- Military career
- Allegiance: British Raj: Hyderabad State
- Branch: British Raj Army: Hyderabad State Forces
- Rank: Commander-in-chief; Major general
- Units: British Raj Army: Hyderabad State Forces; (Hyderabad State) Hyderabad Lancers
- Conflicts: World War I World War II; Operation Polo

Syed Ahmed Muhdar Al-Aydarus (Note: Arabic: السيد أحمد محضار العيدروس, al-Sayyid Aḥmad Miḥḍār al-ʿAydarūs; Telugu: సయ్యద్ అహ్మద్ మిహ్దార్ ఐదారూస్, Sayyid Aḥmed Miḥḍār ʿAydaras; Hindustani (Urdu): سید احمد مہدار عیدروس, Sayyad Aḥmed Miḍār al-ʿAydarūs) (3 March 1899 – 20 July 1962) was an Indo-Yemeni army officer who was the commander-in-chief of the Hyderabad State Forces of the British Raj Army until 1947 and later of the independent Hyderabad State at the time of the annexation of Hyderabad State by India in 1948.

== Birth and descent ==
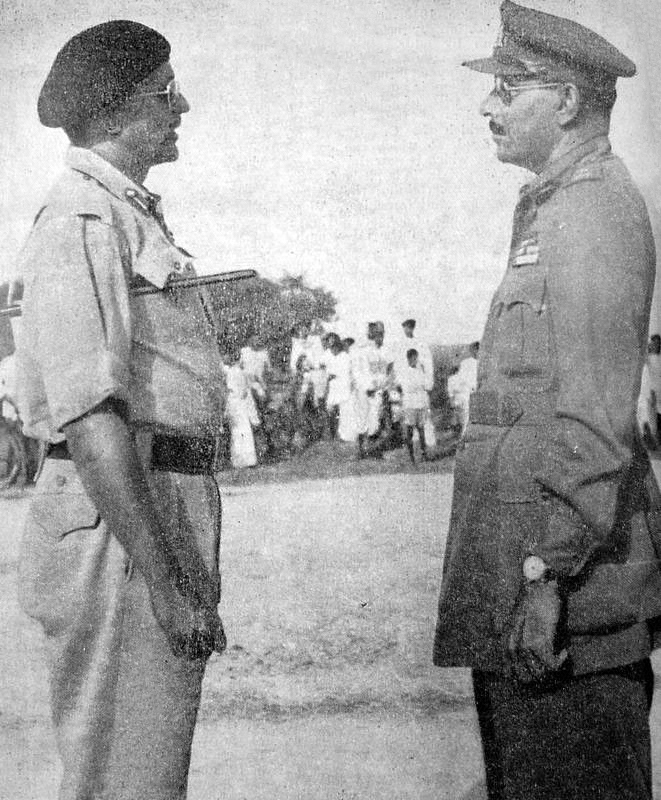
Major General Syed Ahmed Al Aydarus (on the right) offers his surrender of the Hyderabad State Forces to Major General Joyanto Nath Chaudhuri at Secunderabad

Syed Ahmed Al-Aydarus was born as a scion of the Al-Aydarus clan, a branch of the Ba 'Alawi sada, a Husaynid tribe that had been settled in Hadhramaut, and descended from the famed luminary of Tarim, Imam Abdullah al-Aydarus ibn Abu Bakr al-Sakran Ba 'Alawi. His grandfather and father had immigrated from Mukalla in Yemen to Hyderabad in 1887, with Al-Aydarus being born upon Indian soil in 1899, making him a first generation Indian. His grandfather Syed Ahmed bin Ali al-Aydarus was a Habib, a title used to refer to scholars of Alid descent in the Hadhramaut, he migrated to Hyderabad via Calicut with his sons as traders in the lucrative pearl and horse trade. This led the family to supplying horses for the cavalry regiments of the Nizam of Hyderabad, allowing close martial ties whereupon Al-Aydarus's father Syed Muhdar Ahmed Al-Aydarus built a career in the army. His maternal family is said to trace their descent from an Arab general who had fought against the Byzantines in the 7th century, with an allegiance to the Rashidun Caliphate. He was commissioned in 1919. Al-Aydarus participated in both World Wars, serving in the 1st Hyderabad Lancers.

== Military career and life in the Hyderabad State ==
Al-Aydarus was a close confidante and trusted aide of the Nizam of Hyderabad. His brothers were also senior officers and distinguished members of the Nizam's army. Al-Aydarus was highly fluent in the Hyderabad State's official languages; Telugu and Urdu, alongside his mother tongue Arabic.

He was ready for a war but was advised by the Nizam of Hyderabad, Mir Osman Ali Khan, not to fight and surrendered to the Indian Army forces outside of Hyderabad city so that there would be no bloodshed of innocent people.

In September 1948, Al-Aydarus held the rank of Major-General and Commander of the State Army of Hyderabad. This numbered 6,000 men and consisted of three armoured regiments, a horse cavalry regiment, 11 infantry battalions and artillery. It was supported by 18,000 poorly armed and trained irregulars. In the course of Operation Polo, the Indian Army was able to scatter this mixed force in five days of fighting. General Al-Aydarus, who had advised the Nizam against opposing the entry of Indian forces, surrendered on 17 September. In 1950, General Al-Aydarus was arrested on the allegation of helping Mir Laiq Ali to escape to Pakistan. After two months he was released after an enquiry did not find any evidence against him. He left Hyderabad and settled in Bangalore. His children emigrated to Pakistan.

== Autobiography ==
His autobiography Hyderabad of the Seven Loaves was published in April 1994 and presented a historical account of the Asaf Jahi dynasty with an autobiographical sketch of the author, covering the events of Hyderabad's merger with the Indian Union. It narrates several anecdotes and facts about the city during the Nizami reign. The book also contains some rare pictures of the royal and aristocratic events that took place at the time.
