= Hyderabad massacres =

Genocidal massacres against Muslims

Coordinates: 18.19°N 76.04°E

1948 Hyderabad massacres
- Part of the Annexation of Hyderabad
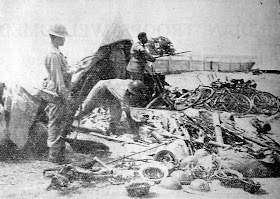
- Indian Army officers ordered the surrender of all arms, but in practice, only Muslims were disarmed. Hindus, whom the military deemed less of a threat, were often allowed to keep their weapons which resulted in the massacres.

- Hyderabad State
- Location: Hyderabad State (hardest-hit areas were Osmanabad, Nanded, Gulbarga and Bidar)
- Date: 13 September 1948 – October 1948; 78 years ago
- Target: Hyderabadi Muslims
- Attack type: looting, arson, mass murder, rape
- Deaths: 27,000-40,000 (Sunderlal committee); 200,000 (estimate by responsible observers)
- Perpetrators: Hindu population; Indian Army soldiers
- Motive: retributive violence; Religious bigotry

The Hyderabad massacres were the mass killings and massacre of Hyderabadi Muslims that took place following the Indian annexation of Hyderabad (Operation Polo). The killings were perpetrated by local Hindu fanatics, often supported by the Indian Army soldiers. Wilfred Cantrell Smith, based on leaked contents of a confidential report by Pandit Sunderlal and Qazi Abdulghaffar commissioned by Nehru, estimated that between 50,000 and 200,000 Muslims were killed.

== Violence ==
The violence occurred in many rural areas, however, the hardest-hit areas were Osmanabad, Nanded, Gulbarga and Bidar where "the sufferers were Muslims who formed the hopeless minority."

The crimes that were committed by the local Hindus included the desecration of mosques, mass killings, the seizure of houses and land, looting and burning of Muslim shops, as well as the rape and abduction of Muslim women.

In addition to mass killings, activists such as Sundarayya claim that Indian soldiers systematically engaged in torture, rape, and looting.

The Pandit Sunderlal Committee that was commissioned by Jawaharlal Nehru, in his "personal capacity". Its report contained analysis of the violence that took place during and after Operation Polo. The report, although made in 1948, was kept hidden from public eyes, until it was made available for viewing at the Nehru Memorial Museum and Library. It is unconfirmed why the report was hidden, but some say it was to prevent further instances of communal violence by Razakars from happening. Vallabhbhai Patel refused to accept this report, and when sent a copy, had said, "There could have been no question of Government of India sending any goodwill mission to India...There is all about the Razakar atrocities on Hindus..." The Confidential Notes of the Sunderlal Report, the authors issued an entire section of Razakar atrocities.

During our tours, we also heard statements of Razakar atrocities...Their atrocities chiefly consisted of levying monthly amounts i.e., Zizya (Jaziya) on every town and village. Wherever these amounts were willingly paid there was generally no further trouble. But at places they were resisted, loot, rape and murder of innocent Hindus followed. If there was no trouble during the loot trouble generally ended, in the removal of looted property, sometimes in motor trucks. But wherever there was further resistance, arson, murder, even rape and abduction of women followed.

The report also conservatively put the death toll to between 27,000 and 40,000 Muslim civilian lives lost. Violence by Hindus is told largely through the reports, eyewitness accounts and other sources.

In Osmanabad....the town of Latur in the same district fared even worse. Some witnesses told us that the number of Muslims murdered by Hindus in Latur was somewhere between 2000 and 2500...Latur was a big business centre. It had big Kutchi merchants. The total Muslim population was nearly ten thousand. When we visited the town, it was barely three thousand. Many ran away to save their lives, The killing lasted twenty days...Our idea is that the total killed in Gulbarga district must have been between 5000 and 8000...The district of Bidar fared at least as ill if not worse than Gulbarga. The fourth district is Nanded. With the total killed according to our estimate somewhere between 2000 and 4000. When we talk of killing, we do not include those who died fighting but only those murdered in cold blood.

It appears that as the Muslim population fled in panic towards the headquarters of the state or other villages which they thought might be safer, but it was not, a very large number was killed on the way and in the jungles. In many places, we were shown well or Bawaries still full corpses rotting. In one such, we counted 11 bodies which included that of a woman with a small child sticking to her breast...We saw several such wells. We saw remnants of corpses lying in ditches. In several places, the bodies had been burnt, and we could see the charred bones and skulls still lying there.

...we had unimpeachable evidence to the effect that there were instances in which men belonging to the local Hindus and also to the local police took part in the looting and local crimes...soldiers encouraged, persuaded and in a few cases even compelled the Hindu mobs to loot Muslim homes and shops. In another district, a judge's house, among others, was looted by soldiers and a Tehsildar's wife was molested. Complaints of molestation and abduction of girls, against Indian soldiers, were none or very rare.

We are also informed that a large mix of trained and armed men from a well-known Hindu organization filtered into the state along with the Indian Army from Sholapur...The Indian Army wherever it went, ordered the people to surrender all arms. The order applied to Hindus and Muslims alike. But in practice, while all arms were taken from the Muslims, sometimes with the Hindu population, the Hindus from whom the Indian military had little to fear were left in possession of their arms.

== See also ==
- Partition of India
- Persecution of Muslims
- Religious violence in India
- Violence against Muslims in independent India
