= Ajit Rudra =

Indian military officer

Major General Ajit Rudra

General Officer Commanding, Southern Command

Personal details
- Born: 20 October 1896
- Died: 3 November 1993 (aged 97)
- Awards: Order of the British Empire

Military service
- Allegiance: United Kingdom (1914–1918); British India (1918–1947); India (1947-1959)
- Branch/service: British Army; British Indian Army; Indian Army
- Years of service: 1914 - 1959
- Rank: Major General
- Unit: Royal Fusiliers; Punjab Regiment
- Commands: GOC-in-C Southern Command
- Battles/wars: First World War; Battle of Mons; Battle of the Somme; Third Anglo-Afghan War; Second World War; Burma Campaign; Arakan campaign; Annexation of Hyderabad

Major General Ajit Anil "Jik" Rudra OBE (20 October 1896 – 3 November 1993) was an Indian military officer who served as General Officer Commanding, Southern Command of the Indian Army.

== Early life and education ==
Born in Delhi to the famous educationist S. K. Rudra and Priyobala Singha, he was educated at St. Stephen's College, Delhi and at Trinity College, Kandy in Ceylon. He thereafter went on to attend University of Cambridge.

== Marriage ==
Jik married Edith Lall on 16 November 1923 at Lahore Cathedral.

== Military career ==
With the out break of World War I, Rudra enlisted in the British Army leaving Cambridge to join the University and Public School Brigade and took part in the Battle of Mons. Having not been qualified for a commission he joined the 2nd Battalion of the Royal Fusiliers and took part in the Battle of the Somme having been one of the 80 odd survivors of the charge of the 500 Fusiliers. He went on to become a sergeant and was wounded. In 1918, he was selected for OTC at Inns of court but was not able to complete it as the war ended. Having been declined a commission, he requested to be discharged from the Army. The war office instead sent him to India.

After World War I concluded in 1918, the Indian politicians raised a demand to grant Indians the King's Commission. After strict screening, Rudra was selected for the first batch that underwent rigorous pre-commission training. In 1919, he joined the first batch of the King's Commissioned Indian Officers (KCIOs) at the Daly College in Indore. His batchmates included Kodandera M. Cariappa, who later went on to become a Field Marshal of the Indian Army.

On 1 December 1919, Rudra was commissioned into the 28th Punjabis as a temporary second lieutenant in the British Indian Army, and was posted in Palestine; seven months later, on 17 July 1920, he was appointed to a permanent commission as a second lieutenant, with seniority from the date of his temporary commission. Promoted to temporary lieutenant on 1 December 1920, he took part in the Third Afghan War and served in the North-West Frontier, Baluchistan, Waziristan and Peshawar, receiving promotion to the substantive rank of lieutenant on 17 July 1921.

Rudra was promoted to captain on 17 October 1927; he was promoted to major on 27 March 1939. During World War II, he took part in the Arakan Campaign 1942–43. During this period, he was promoted to acting lieutenant-colonel on 15 June 1943 and to temporary lieutenant-colonel on 14 September 1943.

In 1943, Lieutenant Colonel Rudra was transferred to the General Staff at GHQ India by General Claude Auchinleck, and was promoted to acting colonel on 3 April 1945. He was further promoted to temporary colonel on 3 October 1945 and to acting brigadier on 27 March 1946. In June 1946, Rudra was appointed an Officer of the Order of the British Empire (Military Division) in the British government's Birthday Honours List. The following month, on 17 July 1946, by then a temporary brigadier and Director of Morale, GHQ, he was promoted to the substantive rank of lieutenant-colonel. In 1948, the year after India gained its independence, Brigadier Rudra was serving as the Military Secretary at GHQ and was instrumental in the formation of the post independence Indian Army. He was subsequently promoted to acting major-general and given command of a division, with promotion to substantive major-general on 1 January 1950. During the Annexation of Hyderabad he led a field force that attacked from Vijayawada. He was appointed General Officer Commanding, Southern Command and retired in 1959.

He died in 1993 at the age of 97 after prolonged illness.
