= Jayanto Nath Chaudhuri =

Indian Army general (1908–1983)

General J N Chaudhuri OBE
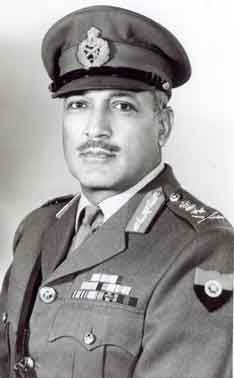

9th High Commissioner of India to Canada
- In office July 1966 – August 1969
- Preceded by: B. K. Acharya
- Succeeded by: A.B. Bhadkamkar

11th Chairman of the Chiefs of Staff Committee
- In office 3 March 1966 – 7 June 1966
- President: Sarvepalli Radhakrishnan
- Prime Minister: Indira Gandhi
- Preceded by: Bhaskar Sadashiv Soman
- Succeeded by: Arjan Singh

5th Chief of the Army Staff
- In office 20 November 1962 – 7 June 1966
- President: Sarvepalli Radhakrishnan
- Prime Minister: Jawaharlal Nehru; Gulzarilal Nanda (acting); Lal Bahadur Shastri; Indira Gandhi
- Preceded by: Pran Nath Thapar
- Succeeded by: P. P. Kumaramangalam

Military Governor of Hyderabad State
- In office 17 September 1948 – 25 January 1950
- Preceded by: Office Established
- Succeeded by: Mir Osman Ali Khan as Rajapramukh

Personal details
- Born: 10 June 1908 Chatmohar, East Bengal, British India (now Pabna, Bangladesh)
- Died: 6 April 1983 (aged 74) New Delhi, India
- Education: University of Calcutta; Highgate School, London
- Military career
- Allegiance: British India (1928–1947); India (1947–1983)
- Branch: British Indian Army (1928–1947); Indian Army (1947–1966)
- Service years: 1928–1966
- Rank: General
- Nickname: Muchhu
- Service number: IA-130
- Units: 7th Light Cavalry; 16 Light Cavalry
- Commands: Southern Army; 1st Armoured Division; 16 Light Cavalry
- Conflicts: Second World War; East African campaign; Western Desert campaign; Burma campaign; India–Pakistan war of 1947; Operation Polo; Annexation of Goa; Sino-Indian War; Operation Desert Hawk; India–Pakistan war of 1965
- Awards: Padma Vibhushan; Officer of the Order of the British Empire; Order Of Merit (Arab Union)

General Jayanto Nath Chaudhuri OBE (10 June 1908 – 6 April 1983) was an Indian army general who served as the 5th Chief of Army Staff of the Indian Army from 1962 to 1966 and the Military Governor of Hyderabad State from 1948 to 1949. After his retirement from the Indian Army, he served as the Indian High Commissioner to Canada from 19 July 1966 until August 1969.

== Family background and early life ==
Chaudhuri was born into an aristocratic Bengali Brahmin of the Moitro gotra, a family which produced many lawyers and writers. His family were the Zamindars (landlords) of Haripur and the family was known as the Chaudhuris of Haripur in the province of Bengal, British India. Chaudhuri's paternal grandfather, Durgadas Chaudhuri, was the landlord of Chatmohar Upazila of Pabna district of present-day Bangladesh. His paternal grandmother, Sukumari Devi (wife of Durgadas Chaudhuri), was the sister of the Nobel laureate poet Rabindranath Tagore. Chaudhuri's mother, Pramila Chaudhuri, was the daughter of Womesh Chandra Bannerjee, who was the first president of the Indian National Congress.

Other members of Chaudhuri's family were also distinguished in their fields, mainly law, medicine and literature. All six of his father's elder brothers, namely Sir Ashutosh Chaudhuri (judge during the British Raj), Jogesh Chandra Chaudhuri(editor of the Calcutta high court journal and barrister), Kumudnath Chaudhuri (barrister), Pramathanath Chaudhuri (writer), Capt. Manmathanath Chaudhuri (first Indian surgeon-general of Madras Presidency) and Dr. Suhridnath Chaudhuri, were distinguished on their own right. Two of them (Sir Asutosh and Pramathanath) were married to their first cousins (mother's brother's daughters), the nieces of Rabindranath Tagore, and the others were married to women from Bengali families. His younger brother, Kali Prasad Choudhuri, served as a pilot officer in the Royal Indian Air Force attached to the Royal Air Force Volunteer Reserve and was killed in action on 18 June 1941 while flying with No. 10 Operational Training Unit RAF in England.

The Indian actress, Devika Rani, was Chaudhuri's first cousin, being the daughter of his father's brother, Manmathnath Chaudhuri. Among Chaudhuri's other close relatives were Barrister Kumud Nath Chaudhuri and Krishna Chandra Chowdhury, zamindar, and philanthropist, of Satbaria,Chittagong.Bangladesh.Was known as 'Nazir'(since he was the head of the bailiffs in the law court). Writer Pramatha Chaudhuri, who married a niece of Rabindranath Tagore, was his uncle.

== Education ==
Chaudhuri completed his early education in Pataldanga Academy (Now known as Hare School) in Calcutta. Later, he studied at St. Xavier's College (University of Calcutta). He also studied at Highgate School in London, from May 1923 until July 1926, and the Royal Military College, Sandhurst. At Sandhurst, he got his nickname, "Muchhu" (owing to his moustache). Ayub Khan, who became President of Pakistan in 1958, was one of his batchmates in Sandhurst. Both of them had trained in the same platoon.

== Military career ==
=== Early career ===
He was commissioned from Sandhurst as a second lieutenant onto the Unattached List, Indian Army on 2 February 1928. Returning to India, he was attached to the 1st battalion North Staffordshire Regiment from 19 March 1928. He was accepted for the Indian Army and joined the 7th Light Cavalry on 19 March 1929. In 1934, he attended the course at the Equitation School, Saugor. He attended the Staff course at Command and Staff College, Quetta from December 1939 to June 1940.

In 1940, as an acting major, he went overseas on the staff of the 5th Infantry Division and saw service in Sudan, Eritrea, Abyssinia and the western deserts of Africa. For his services, he was Mentioned in Dispatches on 30 December 1941, for distinguished services in the Middle East Feb to July 1941, and again on 30 June 1942 for the same from July to October 1941. He was awarded the OBE on 18 February 1943 for gallant and distinguished services in the Middle East between May and Oct 1942. Recalled to India, he was appointed a senior Instructor at the Command and Staff College, Quetta as a GSO-1 in 1943. In August 1944 he was transferred to the 16th Light Cavalry. Then a temporary Lt. Colonel, he commanded this unit from September 1944 to October 1945 in Burma for which he was twice more Mentioned in Dispatches, (London Gazette 9/5/46) for gallant and distinguished services in Burma (Temporary Lt-Col 16th Light Cavalry) and (London Gazette 17/9/46) for gallant and distinguished services in Burma (Temporary Lt-Col, Indian Armoured Corps). At the end of the Burma campaign, he saw service in French Indochina and in Java, Indonesia with his regiment.

In 1946, he was promoted to the temporary rank of Brigadier with the war-substantive rank of lieutenant-colonel, in Charge of Administration in British Malaya and in the same year was selected to command the Indian Victory Contingent to London.

=== Post-Independence career ===
Following a course at the Imperial Defence College in London in 1947, he returned to India and was appointed Director of Military Operations & Intelligence at Army Headquarters in New Delhi in November 1947.

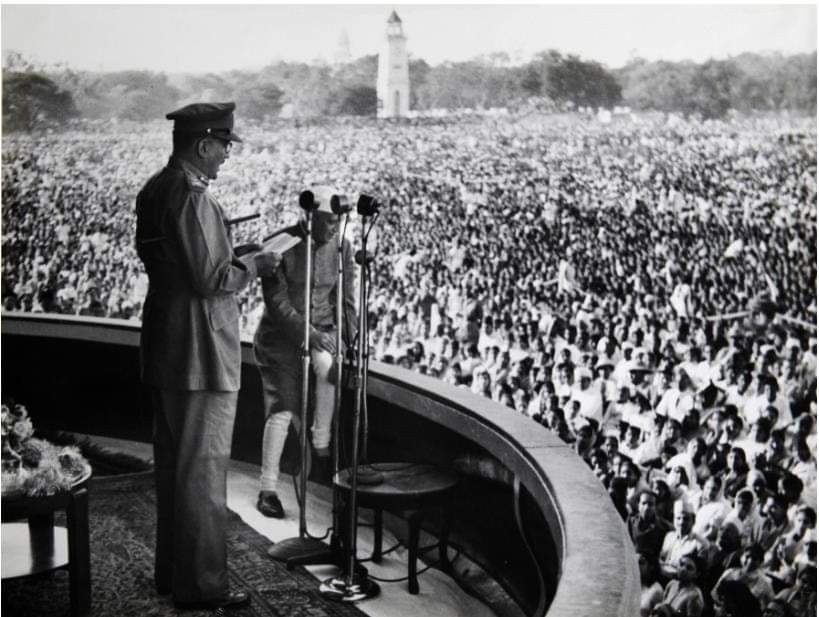
Major General Chaudhuri addressing crowd at Fateh Maidan after integration of Hyderabad in 1948 with Jawaharlal Nehru sitting on the parapet

Chaudhuri worked with Major General Mohite to complete military evacuation from Pakistan. He had to organise the Kashmir war effort up to May 1948, when he was succeeded by the then Brig. Sam Manekshaw as DMO and Chand Narayan Das as Director of Military Intelligence.

=== General officer ===
In February 1948, he was promoted to acting Major General and became the officiating Chief of the General Staff. In May that year, he took over command of the 1st Armoured Division.

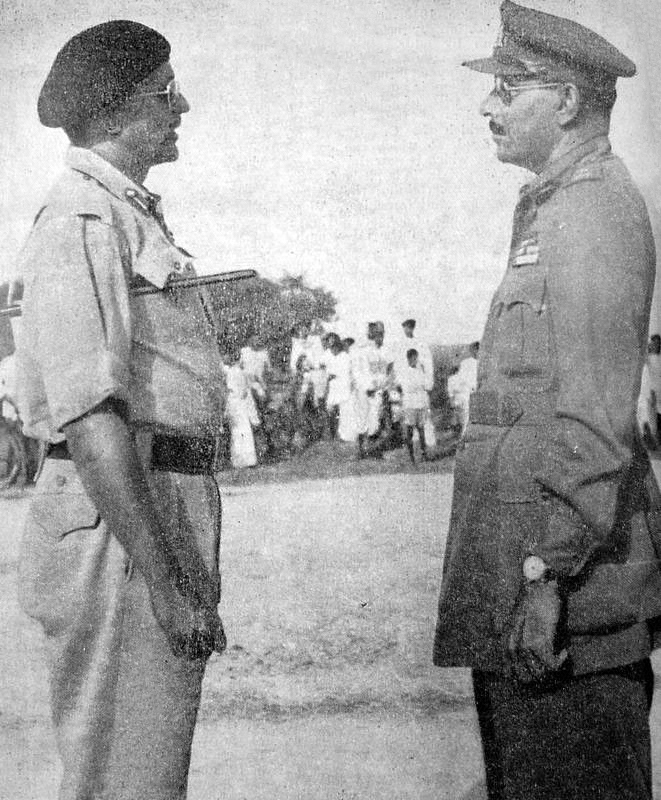
Maj Gen Syed Ahmed El Edroos (right) offers his surrender of the Hyderabad State Forces to Maj Gen Chaudhuri at Secunderabad.

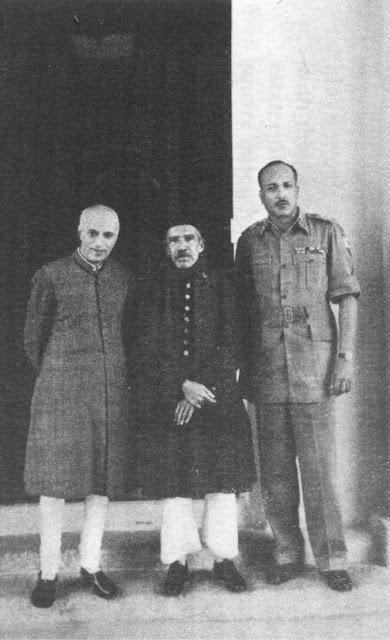
(From left to right): Prime Minister Jawaharlal Nehru, Nizam VII and Jayanto Nath Chaudhuri after Hyderabad's accession to India

In September, the 1st Armoured Division played a major role in the 1948 Hyderabad Operations. He received the surrender of the Hyderabad State Forces from Major General Syed Ahmed El Edroos at Secunderabad. Following Operation Polo in 1948, he was appointed the Military Governor of Hyderabad State.

In the years following, he occupied important military posts and led an Indian Military Delegation to China. In 1949, he was appointed the first Colonel Commandant of the Corps of Electrical & Mechanical Engineers and was promoted to substantive brigadier on 1 January 1950.

In January 1952, he was appointed the Adjutant General at Army HQ, as a substantive major-general, and in January 1953, he again took over as the Chief of the General Staff. He was promoted to local lieutenant-general on 16 December 1955 and given command of a corps, with promotion to substantive lieutenant-general on 8 May 1957. He was appointed GOC-in-C Southern Command on 25 May 1959.

=== Chief of the Army staff ===
The debacle of the Sino-Indian War and subsequent government inquiries revealing India's military unpreparedness and mismanagement resulted in the Chief of the Army Staff (COAS) Pran Nath Thapar's resignation on 19 November 1962. On 20 November, Chaudhuri succeeded Thapar as officiating COAS with the acting rank of general. Chaudhuri was officially appointed COAS on 20 February 1963, and was promoted to substantive general on 20 July 1963. In March 1964, he was decorated with the Grand Cordon of the Order of Merit of the United Arab Republic by its president, Gamal Abdel Nasser.

Chaudhari was COAS during the India–Pakistan war of 1965, generally regarded as a strategic defeat for Pakistan as it failed to achieve its objectives of capturing Kashmir.

Chaudhari is regarded as one of the founding fathers of the Border Security Force. In the aftermath of the 1965 war, he proposed a paramilitary force to patrol the India–Pakistan border in peacetime and would be relieved by the army when war was imminent. For his services to the nation, he was awarded the Padma Vibhushan, India's second highest civilian honour by the President of India. He retired on 7 June 1966, after completing 38 years of military service.

== Diplomatic career ==
After his retirement, Chaudhuri was appointed High Commissioner of India to Canada. After a three-year stint at the High Commission of India at Ottawa, he relinquished office, handing over to A. B. Bhadkamkar in August 1969.

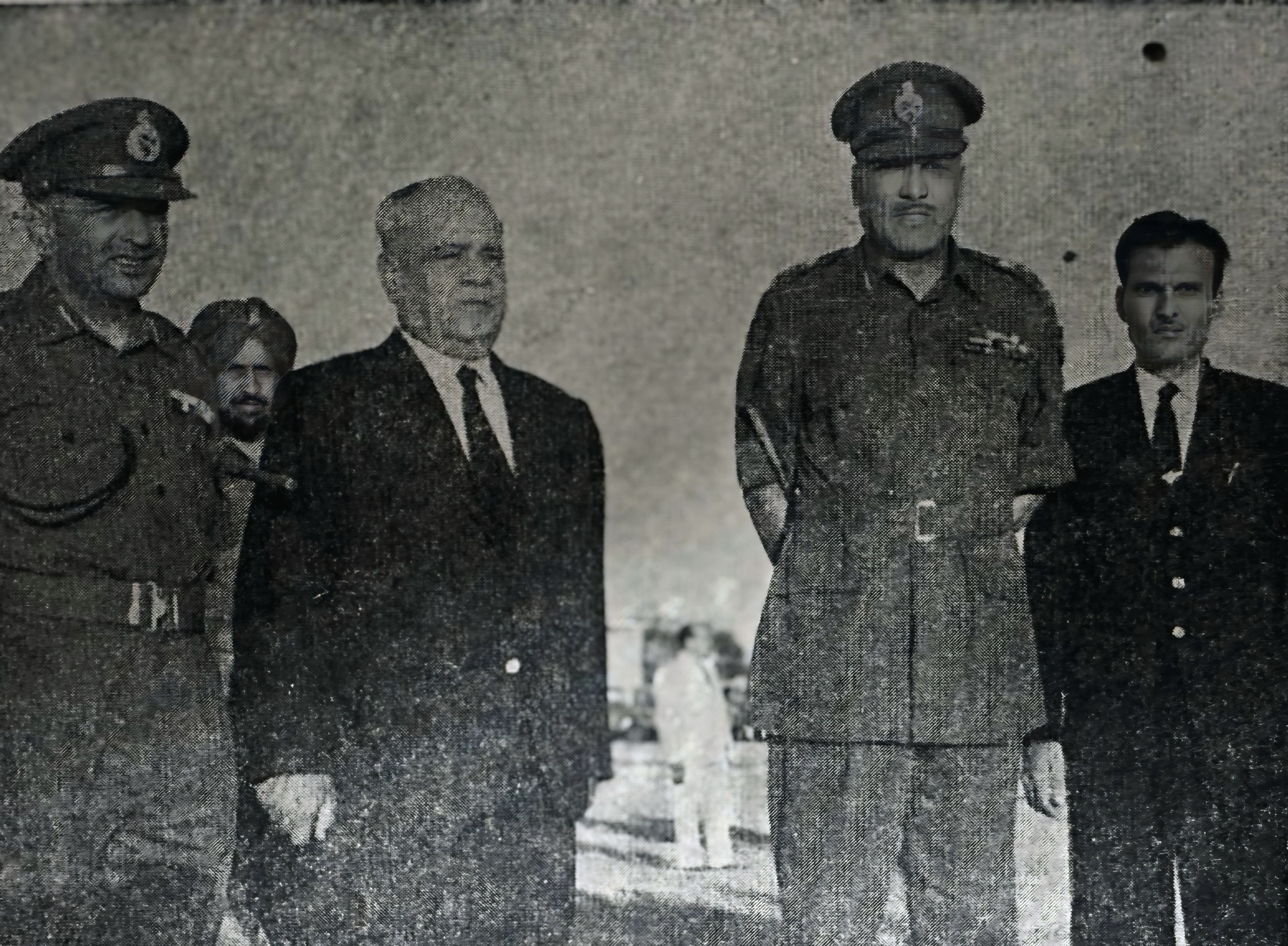
Narayan Prasad Shukla welcoming Major General Jayanto Nath Chaudhuri at Indore Airport, along with Prof. Julsi, Principal of Daly College.

== Later years and legacy ==
Chaudhuri wrote two books on military matters and served as a literary reviewer for a leading Indian daily The Statesman. He was the first Indian army chief to write an autobiography in 1979. He loved Western music and founded and was first president of the Delhi Symphony Society, an organisation that promoted Western music. In 1964 he co-founded the Delhi Symphony Orchestra with Caroline Taylor Craig, a prominent concert pianist from the United States. Chaudhuri was married to Karuna Chattopadhyay, with whom he had two sons.

Chaudhuri died at his home in Pamposh Enclave, New Delhi of a cardiac arrest on 6 April 1983. His funeral and cremation the following day, with full military honours, was attended by hundreds of serving and retired officers and soldiers, including his fellow Chiefs of Staff, Admiral A. K. Chatterji and Air Chief Marshal Arjan Singh. In his honour, the BSF awards its best infantry battalion with the GEN. J. N. Chaudhuri trophy annually.

== Awards and decorations ==

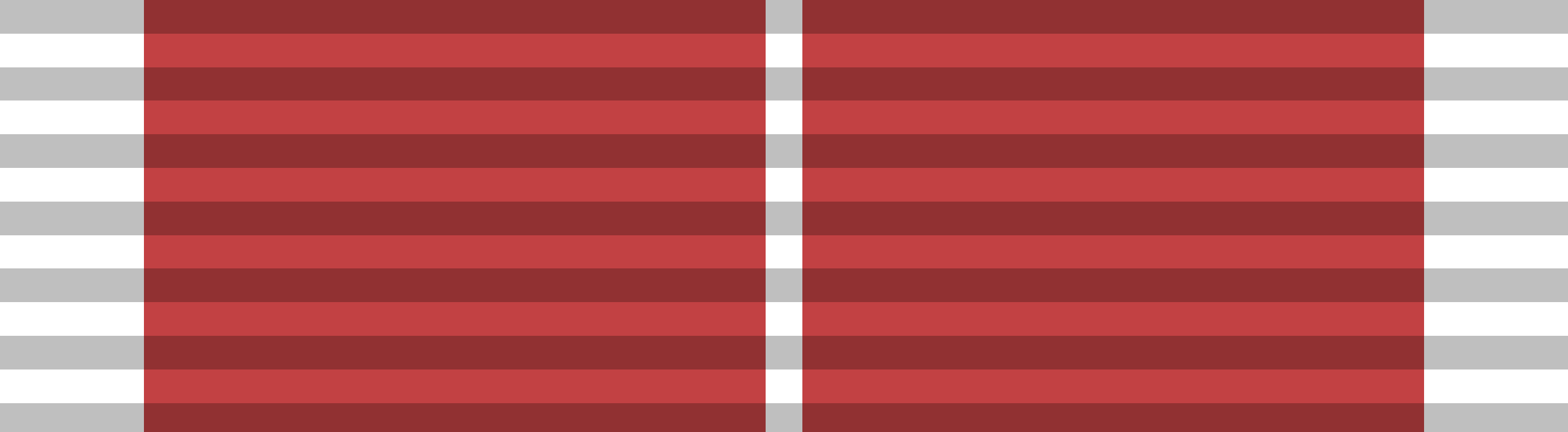

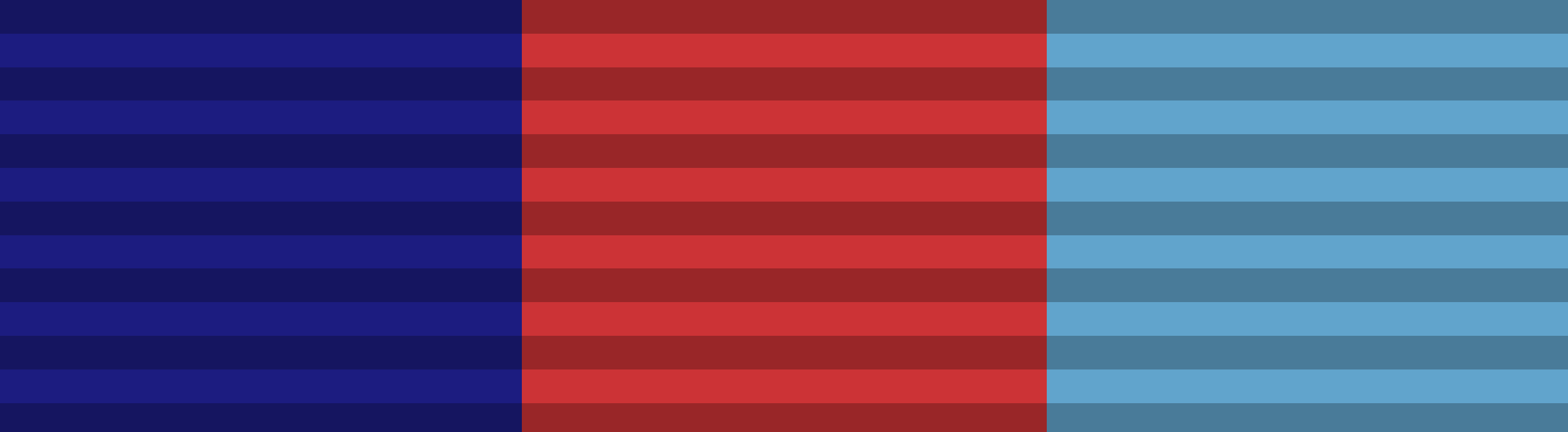

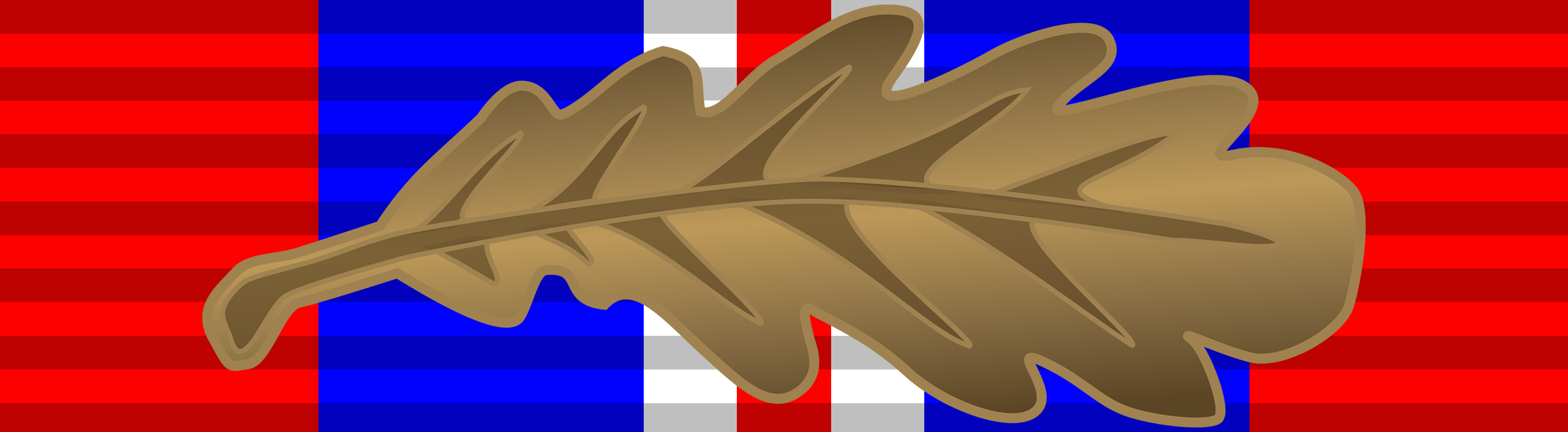

	Padma Vibhushan	General Service Medal 1947	
Sainya Seva Medal	Indian Independence Medal	Officer of the Order of the British Empire (Military Division)	1939–1945 Star
Burma Star	War Medal 1939–1945	India Service Medal	Grand Cordon of the Order of Merit (United Arab Republic)

== Dates of rank ==
Insignia	Rank	Component	Date of rank
	Second Lieutenant	British Indian Army	2 February 1928
	Lieutenant	British Indian Army	2 May 1930
	Captain	British Indian Army	2 February 1937
	Major	British Indian Army	1940 (acting); 22 September 1941 (temporary); 8 February 1943 (war-substantive); 2 February 1945 (substantive)
	Lieutenant-Colonel	British Indian Army	22 September 1941 (acting); 8 February 1943 (temporary); 21 January 1946 (war-substantive)
	Colonel	British Indian Army	21 January 1946 (acting)
	Major	Indian Army	15 August 1947 (Note: Upon independence in 1947, India became a Dominion within the British Commonwealth of Nations. As a result, the rank insignia of the British Army, incorporating the Tudor Crown and four-pointed Bath Star ("pip"), was retained, as George VI remained Commander-in-Chief of the Indian Armed Forces. After 26 January 1950, when India became a republic, the President of India became Commander-in-Chief, and the Ashoka Lion replaced the crown, with a five-pointed star being substituted for the "pip.")
	Major-General	Indian Army	February 1948 (acting)
	Brigadier	Indian Army	21 January 1946 (acting); 1 January 1950 (substantive)
	Brigadier	Indian Army	26 January 1950 (recommissioning and change in insignia)
	Major General	Indian Army	11 January 1952 (substantive)
	Lieutenant General	Indian Army	16 December 1955 (local); 8 May 1957 (substantive)
	General (COAS)	Indian Army	20 November 1962 (acting); 20 July 1963 (substantive)

== See also ==
- Indian Army

== Notes ==
Military offices
Preceded by Pran Nath Thapar	Chief of the General Staff (officiating); 1948-1948	Succeeded by Kalwant Singh
Preceded by S. P. P. Thorat	Chief of the General Staff; 1953-1955	Succeeded by Mohinder Singh Wadalia
Preceded by Pran Nath Thapar	General Officer Commanding-in-Chief Southern Command; 1959-1962	Succeeded by Lionel Protip Sen
Preceded by Pran Nath Thapar	Chief of the Army Staff; 1962-1966	Succeeded by Paramasiva Prabhakar Kumaramangalam
Preceded by Vice Admiral Bhaskar Sadashiv Soman	Chairman of the Chiefs of Staff Committee; 1966-1966	Succeeded by Air Chief Marshal Arjan Singh
Diplomatic posts
Preceded by B K Acharya	High Commissioner of India to Canada; 1966–1969	Succeeded by A B Bhadkamkar
