= S. K. Rudra =

Indian educationist

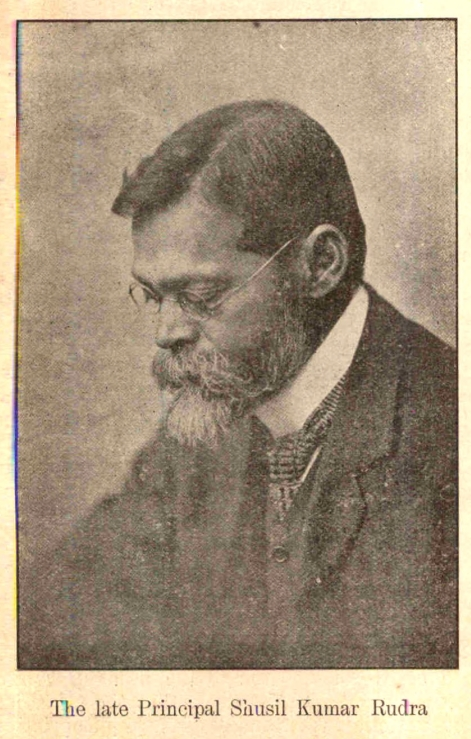

Susil Kumar Rudra (7 January 1861 – 29 June 1925) was an Indian educationalist and associate of Mahatma Gandhi and C F Andrews who served as the first Indian principal of St Stephen's College, Delhi.

== Early life and family ==
Rudra was a second generation Bengali Christian from a large land holding family of Bansberia in the Hooghly District of Bengal. His father Pyari Mohun Rudra converted to Christianity in 1860 under the influence of the Scottish missionary Alexander Duff and his mother followed suit the following year. His father subsequently became a missionary working with the Church Mission Society in Calcutta and in rural Bengal. Rudra graduated from the University of Calcutta and left for Punjab where he became a member of staff of St Stephen's College in 1886.

Rudra married Priyobala Singh in 1889 who died of typhoid in 1897. The couple had three sons, the youngest of whom, Ajit Anil Rudra, was one of the first Indians to receive the King's Commission in the Punjab Regiment, going on to become a Major General in the Indian Army.

== At St Stephen's College ==
Rudra worked at St Stephen's College from 1886 until his retirement in 1923 where he variously taught English, economics and logic. In 1906, he became its fourth, and first Indian, principal and served in that post until his retirement in 1923. It is thought that Rudra might have been the first Indian to hold that post in any missionary institution in India. Under Rudra, the college grew both in size and reputation and became a largely residential college. Along with C F Andrews, Rudra drew up a constitution for the college that helped Indianise it, gradually moving administrative control away from its founders, the Cambridge Brotherhood. It was also under him that a policy of equal pay for staff irrespective of race was adopted at the college.

== Gandhi's associate ==
Rudra was a close friend and associate of Gandhi and of C F Andrews. On Gandhi's maiden visit to Delhi after his return from South Africa, he stayed with Principal Rudra at his official residence on the College premises in Kashmere Gate. Later, the draft for the Non-Cooperation Movement and an open letter to the Viceroy outlining the Khilafat demand were also prepared at this house. While Gandhi revered him as a 'silent servant', he was reluctant to stay with him after the declaration of the anti-Rowlatt Satyagraha fearing it would compromise Rudra and expose the college to unnecessary risk. Gandhi's demurrals were however rejected by Rudra who saw this hospitality as only 'a little service to his country'.

Rudra held a close friendship with Andrews who joined St Stephen's College in 1904. Andrews turned down the job of Principal in 1906 to enable Rudra to become the college's first Indian principal. In 1911, Rudra helped Lala Hardayal, a Stephanian who headed the Ghadar Movement leave the country. Inspired by Rudra, Andrews and Rev William Pearson left for South Africa in 1914 to persuade Gandhi to return to India and lead the country's freedom struggle. Andrews was also responsible for bringing together Rudra, Rabindranath Tagore, Gandhi and Sarojini Naidu in memorable friendships. It is believed that Tagore finalised the English draft of the Gitanjali while staying at Rudra's residence when he visited St Stephen's College in October 1916.

== Death and commemoration ==
Rudra retired to Solan in Himachal Pradesh on his superannuation from St Stephen's College in 1923. He died there, aged 64, on 29 June 1925 and is buried at the English Chapel in Solan. In an obituary Gandhi wrote in Young India, he called Rudra and Andrews his revisionists and described Rudra as a silent but deeply interested spectator in the happenings of the national struggle. Rudra left a sum of ₹1,000 to St Stephen's College whose interest would serve to host an annual dinner for the College's servants. The event, called the Rudra Dinner, held on 12 February every year commemorates the death anniversary of Mrs Priyobala Rudra and the birth anniversary of C F Andrews both of which happen to fall on the same day. Rudra was also one of the founding members of the Modern School in Delhi where since 1928, the Rudra Prize has been instituted in his honour. Andrews' works North India (1908) and Sadhu Sundar Singh (1934) are dedicated to Rudra.
