= Razakars (Hyderabad) =

1940s Muslim anti-accession militia in Hyderabad

- Formation: 1938
- Founder: Bahadur Yar Jung
- Dissolved: 1948
- Type: Paramilitary
- Purpose: Supporting Mir Osman Ali Khan in resisting the integration of Hyderabad with India
- Headquarters: Hyderabad
- Region served: Hyderabad State
- Leader: Bahadur Yar Jung; Qasim Razvi
- Affiliations: Majlis-e-Ittehadul Muslimeen

The Razakars were a paramilitary wing of the Majlis-e-Ittehadul Muslimeen (MIM; transl. Council for Muslim Unity), an Islamic political party in the Hyderabad princely state of British India. Formed in 1938 by MIM leader Bahadur Yar Jung, the organisation expanded considerably during the leadership of Qasim Razvi around the time of the partition of India. Its primary objective was to maintain the rule of the Muslim Nizams of Hyderabad and prevent the accession of Hyderabad to India.

One of the pretexts for Operation Polo by India which led to its annexation of Hyderabad was the refusal by the Nizam to disband the Razakars. The Razakars were the main resistance to the Indian Army during the operation. After they were defeated, the Nizam surrendered and agreed to disband the Razakars. Qasim Razvi was initially jailed and then allowed to move to Pakistan where he was granted asylum.

They were involved in various human right abuses and committed atrocities including mass killings, rapes and looting of villages, against the Hindu majority (which overwhelmingly favored Hyderabad's accession with India), and against participants of the Telangana Rebellion.

== History ==
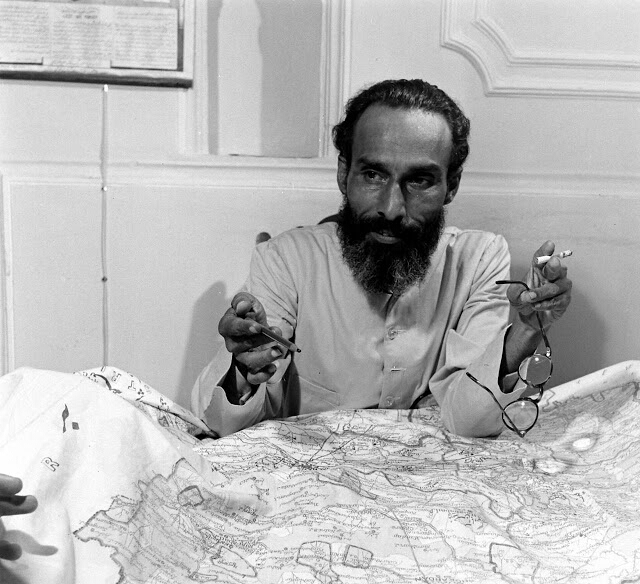
Qasim Razvi, the leader of the Razakars.

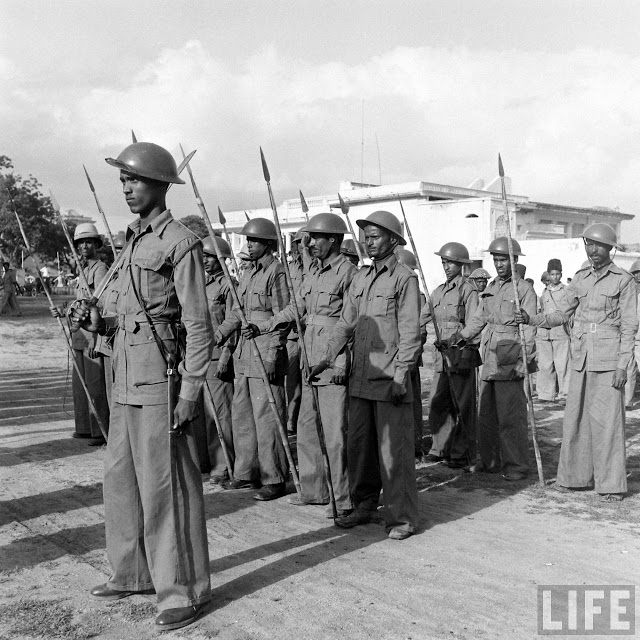
Razakars during Operation Polo.

With the Indian Independence Act 1947, the British left the princely states with the choice of joining either India or Pakistan or opting for full independence. However, by 1948 almost all had acceded to either India or Pakistan. One major exception was Hyderabad, where Mir Osman Ali Khan, a Muslim ruler who presided over a largely Hindu population, chose independence and hoped to maintain this with the help of the Razakars and entered into a standstill agreement with India on 29 November 1947 to maintain the status quo. The move was strongly resisted primarily by the Hindu subjects of the kingdom, who wanted state's accession with India.

In 1926, Mahmud Nawaz Khan, a retired Hyderabad official, founded the Majlis-e-Ittehad-ul-Muslimeen (also known as MIM). The MIM became a powerful organization, with a principal focus of marginalizing the political aspirations of Hindus and progressive Muslims through its actions, including the insistence that Hyderabad be declared a Muslim state.

MIM "had its storm troopers" in the Razakars who were headed by Qasim Razvi, a Muslim educated at Aligarh University "who claimed Hyderabad was a Muslim state and that Muslim supremacy was based upon the right of conquest". The Razakars demanded special powers from the Nizam, which they started to misuse and the Nizam had to abide by their dictats. The Nizam sent a delegation to the United Nations to refer the Hyderabad State case to the UN Security Council.

The Razakar militia brutally put down the armed revolts by Communist sympathizers and the peasantry and even eliminated Muslim activists such as journalist Shoebullah Khan who advocated merger with India. The Razakars terrorised the Hindu population and its sympathizers, causing many to flee to safety into the jungles, uninhabited mud forts, or neighboring Indian provinces. The Hyderabad State Congress was banned and its leaders forced to flee to Bezawada or Bombay.

== Annexation after Operation Polo ==
Finally, Sardar Vallabhbhai Patel, the Indian Minister for Home Affairs, decided to undertake "police action" in Hyderabad State to force the Nizam's hand. Operation Polo was launched and the Indian Army, led by Major General J. N. Chaudhuri, entered the state from five directions. The Razakars fought briefly against the overwhelming attack by Indian forces before surrendering on 18 September 1948. Mir Laik Ali, the prime minister of the Nizam, and Qasim Razvi were arrested.

On 22 September 1948, the Nizam withdrew his complaint from the UN Security Council. The merger of Hyderabad into the Indian Union was announced. Major General Chaudhuri took over as military governor of Hyderabad and stayed in that position till the end of 1949. In January 1950, M. K. Vellodi, a senior civil servant was made the Chief Minister of the state and the Nizam was given the position of "Raj Pramukh" or "Governor".

The Pandit Sunderlal Committee Report estimated that between 27,000 and 40,000 lost their lives in the violence that ensued after the operation.

== Disbandment ==
The Razakars were disbanded after the merger of Hyderabad with India and the Majlis-e-Ittehadul Muslimeen was initially banned—though it was allowed to be rechartered as All India MIM (AIMIM) under new leadership in 1957. Qasim Rizvi was jailed and remained in Indian prisons for almost a decade. After his release, he emigrated to Pakistan.

== Popular culture ==
- In 2015, the Indian Marathi-language film Razzakar was released.
- Razakar – Silent Genocide of Hyderabad, a 2024 Indian film was released in Telugu, Hindi, Tamil, Kannada, and Malayalam.

== See also ==
- Muslim National Guard
- Razakars (East Pakistan)
- Hyderabad State Forces
- Qasim Razvi
- Mallikarjun Kharge, the current president of the Indian National Congress, lost his mother and sister in a fire set off by the Razakars while he himself had a narrow escape at the age of 7

== Bibliography ==
- Benichou, Lucien D. (2000) [University of Western Australia, 1985], From Autocracy to Integration: Political Developments in Hyderabad State, 1938-1948, Orient Blackswan, ISBN 978-81-250-1847-6
- Kamat, Manjiri N. (2007), "Border incidents, internal disorder and the Nizam's claim for an independent Hyderabad", in Waltraud Ernst; Biswamoy Pati (eds.), India's Princely States: People, Princes and Colonialism, Routledge, pp. 212–224, ISBN 978-1-134-11988-2
- Kate, P. V. (1987), Marathwada under the Nizams, 1724-1948, Mittal Publications, pp. 73–, ISBN 978-81-7099-017-8
- Sherman, Taylor C. (2007), "The integration of the princely state of Hyderabad and the making of the postcolonial state in India, 1948–56", The Indian Economic and Social History Review, 44 (4): 489–516, doi:10.1177/001946460704400404, S2CID 145000228
