= Tragedy of Hyderabad (book) =

Book Written by Mir Laiq Ali

- Author: Mir Laiq Ali
- Language: English
- Subject: Events from 1911 to 1948
- Genre: History
- Publisher: Pakistan Co-operative Book Society
- Publication date: 1962
- Publication place: Pakistan
- Media type: paperback
- Pages: 308

Tragedy of Hyderabad is a history book by the last Prime Minister of Hyderabad, Mir Laiq Ali. The book was written and published in 1962 and accounts the events that followed the independence of the Hyderabad State and India from the British Empire, as outlined in the Independence of India Act, which reveals that the princely states were given the choice to either join India, Pakistan, or remain independent; Hyderabad chose independence. Dr. Enugu Narasimha Reddy translated the book into Telugu as 'Hyderabad Vishaadham'.
