= Warangal Division =

Warangal Division was administratively part of the Hyderabad State was made up of sixteen districts. Warangal was one of four divisions in the state.

== Districts ==
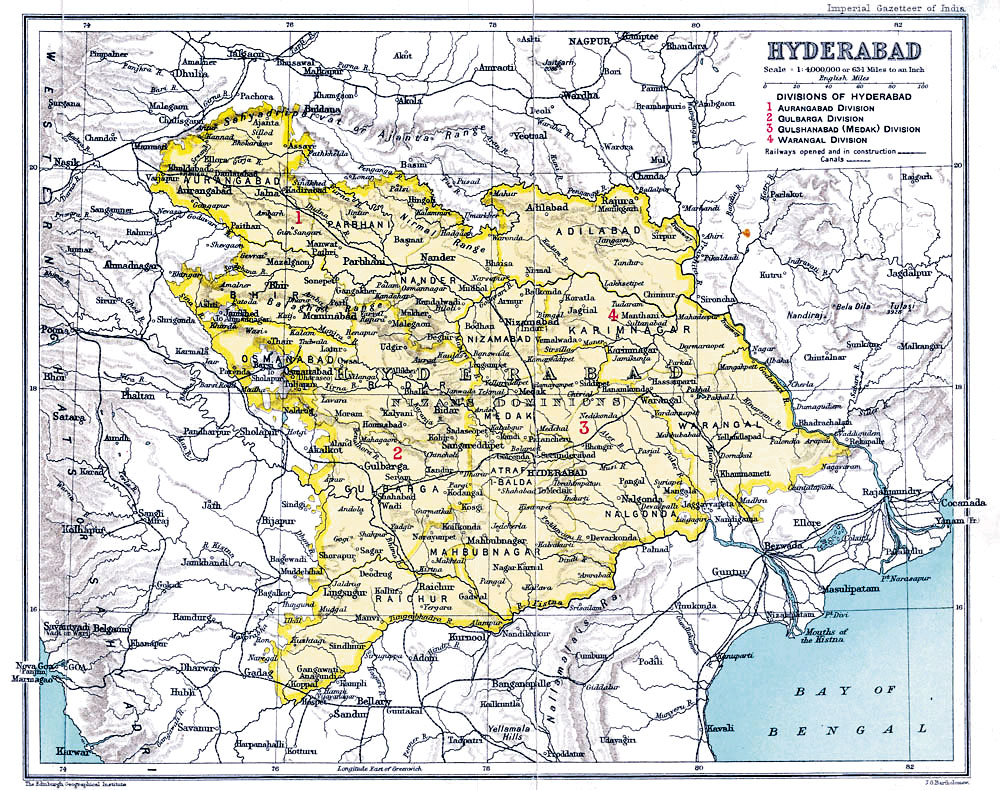
Warangal Division(No.4) of Hyderabad State in 1909

- Adilabad
- Karimnagar
- Warangal (present Khammam district was part of Warangal district).
