= Rajeshwar =

- village
- Location in Karnataka, India Rajeshwar (India)
- Coordinates: 17.86°N 76.95°E
- Country: India
- State: Karnataka
- District: Bidar
- Talukas: Basavakalyan
- Elevation: 587 m (1,926 ft)

Population (2001)
  - Total: 14,003

Languages
  - Official: Kannada
- Time zone: UTC+5:30 (IST)
- Postal code: 585331
- Nearest city: Bidar
- Literacy: 50%

Rajeshwar is a town in the southern state of Karnataka, India. It is located in the Basavakalyan taluk of Bidar district in Karnataka, which is on NH-9. Rajeshwar has big "Ram Linga Swamy" temple. Rajeshwar is 16 kilometres away from its taluka Basavakalyan, 66 kilometres from Bidar and 76 kilometres from Kalaburagi.

== Demographics ==
As of 2001 India census, Rajeshwar had a population of 16343 with 7213 males and 6790 females.

== See also ==
- Bidar
- Basavakalyan
- Districts of Karnataka
