= King's Commissioned Indian Officer =

Officer of the British Indian Army

A King's commissioned Indian officer (KCIO) was an Indian officer of the British Indian Army who held a full King's commission after training in the United Kingdom, either at the Royal Military College, Sandhurst for infantry officers, Woolwich for artillery officers, and Chatham and Woolwich for engineer officers. They had full command over British and Indian troops and officers. In contrast, the Indian commissioned officers (ICOs), who were trained at the Indian Military Academy at Dehra Dun, and the Viceroy's commissioned officers (VCOs), only had authority over Indian troops and officers. KCIOs were introduced in the early 20th century under the Indianisation process. They were equivalent in every way to the British officers holding a King's commission (known in India as King's commissioned officers, or KCOs). In essence, they were commissioned by the King himself at a special induction ceremony. They held the same ranks and privileges as British officers. In fact, most KCIOs served on attachment to a British unit for a year or two early in their careers.

There would be an entrance examination and pre-selection interview for KCIOs.

British Indian Army King's Commissioned Officer (KCO/KICO) rank insignia
Rank group	General officers				Field officers				Junior officers
British Indian Army epaulette rank insignia
Rank	Field marshal	General	Lieutenant-general	Major-general	Brigadier	Colonel	Lieutenant-colonel	Major	Captain	Lieutenant	Second lieutenant	Officer cadet
Abbreviation	FM	Gen	LtGen	MajGen	Brig	Col	LtCol	Maj	Capt	Lt	2Lt	OCdt

== Indianisation ==
It was announced in 1918 that the King's Commission would be opened to Indians for whom ten places would be reserved in the Royal Military College, Sandhurst, UK, to be trained as officers of the Indian Army. The first cadets from both Sandhurst and another defence college, Daly College in Indore, India, were given the King's Commission. There was great disquiet amongst the British, who disliked the idea of serving under native officers; others felt that without good breeding, a public school education, and sufficient suitable training, Indians would not become good officers and would neither be able to lead nor be accepted by the native troops. There was a firm belief among British officers and the home government that only the British educational system could provide the "right kind" of officer, and that it could do it only from "suitable stock."

The Sandhurst training directly pitted young Indian men against young Europeans in conditions alien to their upbringing and experience, and not surprisingly the results were unsatisfactory. Of the first batch of 25 cadets admitted to Sandhurst, ten failed to meet the requisite standard, two died, two resigned, one was deprived of his commission, and ten passed. To remedy this, on 13 March 1922 the Prince of Wales Royal Indian Military College was established for preparing native Indian cadets for entry to Sandhurst.

In the meantime, the first measure taken by the British government to "Indianise" the army - the Eight Unit Scheme of Indianisation - was announced on 17 February 1923. Indian proposals for faster induction were rejected, and equally unrealistic plans for Indianisation over forty years, with restricted kinds of commission, were suggested. Finally, only eight units of the Indian Army were accepted by the British for Indianisation - only five infantry battalions out of 104, two cavalry regiments out of 21, and one pioneer battalion out of seven. They were to be reorganised on the British Army model, with King's Commissioned Indian Officers at every officer level and Indian Warrant Officers replacing Viceroy's Commissioned Officers.

But, subsequently, the KCIOs distinguished themselves as young officers in the 1930s in the run-up to World War II. Most of them served in Waziristan at one time or another. In World War II, they performed outstandingly. During World War II, they fought in the Western Sector against German and Italian forces and in East and Southeast Asia against the Imperial Army of Japan. The sappers constructed the Kohima road and housing for Gen. Slim's army in Imphal. Other KCIOs, as battalion commanders or Acting Brigadiers, took Japanese surrender in Andaman and Nicobar, Vietnam, Indonesia, and Philippines. After World War II, they formed an essential component of the Commonwealth Occupation Forces in Japan.

After Indian independence, they formed the backbone of the Indian and Pakistani armies and defended against the Kashmir attack or were a part of it. Virtually all of them, except those who died in WWII or in the course of their career, rose to very high ranks. Cariappa, Rajendrasinhji, and Ayub Khan became C-in-C; Shrinagesh, Thimayya, Chaudhuri, and Kumaramanglam became Chiefs of the army staff. Ayub Khan became President of Pakistan after staging a military coup while serving as the C-in-C of Pakistan. Nathu Singh Rathore, Kulwant Singh, SPP Thorat, Sant Singh, and LP (Bogey) Sen retired as army commanders. Daulat Singh was army commander, Western Command, when he died in an unfortunate helicopter crash in Nov 1963. Dewan Misri Chand retired prematurely as GOC of Bihar, Bengal, and Orissa. Harkirat Singh became the first Indian Director of the Corps of Electrical and Mechanical Engineers, and later, Engineer-in-Chief, Corps of Engineers—the only person to have ever commanded two technical arms; Kumar Kochar became Quarter-Master General (QMG). Ajit Singh Guraya—whose grandfather, Sepoy Narain Singh Guraya of Haripur, was martyred at the famous Battle of Saragarhi, for which Narain Singh was posthumously awarded the Indian Order of Merit—became Director General of Assam Rifles.

== Eight accepted units ==
The eight units selected were:

- 7th Light Cavalry
- 16th Light Cavalry
- 2nd Battalion, 1st Punjab Regiment
- 5th (Royal) Battalion, 5th Mahratta Light Infantry
- 1st Battalion, 7th Rajput Regiment
- 1st Battalion, 14th Punjab Regiment
- 4th Battalion, 19th Hyderabad Regiment
- 2nd Battalion, 1st Madras Pioneers

== Notable KCIOs ==
The first batch of KCIOs included: Commander-in-Chief Tripura Forces Col. Rana Jodha Jung Bahadur Rana, Amar Singh, Maj. Gen. Ajit Rudra, K.A.D Naoroji (grandson of Dadabhai Naoroji), Field Marshal K.M. Cariappa and C.B. Ponnappa.

Many officers who later held high rank in the post-independence Indian Army and Pakistan Army began their careers as KCIOs. Maj. Gen. Dinkarrao Appasaheb Surve, Field Marshal K.M. Cariappa, Hanmantrao Mohite, Gen Rajendrasinhji, Lt. Gen. Thakur Nathu Singh, Gen Shrinagesh, Lt. Gen. Sant Singh, Gen. K.S. Thimayya, Lt. Gen. S.P.P. Thorat, Lt. Gen. Daulat Singh, Lt. Gen. B.M. Kaul, Maj. Gen. Ishfakul Majid, Maj. Gen. Ajit Singh Guraya, and Field Marshal Ayub Khan were a few of the Sandhurst-trained officers. Maj. Gen. Dewan Misri Chand was the first Indian army aviator and won the Viceroy's Cup Air Race in 1934, being the first Indian to do so; the Government of India issued a postage stamp in his honor.

Maj. Gen. Harkirat Singh, Lt. Gen. Kumar Kochar, and Maj. Gen. Pratap Narain were Sapper officers, trained at Woolwich and Chatham; they further earned a Tripos in Mechanical Sciences from Cambridge University after earning their Commission. Maj. Gen. Harkirat Singh was twice elected President of the Institution of Engineers (India), was the founding chairman of Bharat Earth Movers Ltd., Chairman of Central Road Research Institute, served as Advisor (Construction) in the Planning Commission, Vice-chairman of Heavy Engineering Corporation, and was the first chairman of the monumental National Building Code of India for which he was awarded the K S Moudgill Prize by the Indian Standards Institution (ISI). His contribution to Indian engineering is arguably of the highest level in India. In his honor, the Institution of Engineers (India) holds an annual memorial lecture on his birthday at the Delhi State Centre. Lt Gen Kumar Kochar retired as QMG, while Maj Gen Pratap Narain retired as the Comptroller General Defense Production.

The last of the KCIOs in Indian Army Service was General P.P. Kumaramangalam, who retired in 1969 as Chief of Army Staff.
