= Mir Laiq Ali =

Prime Minister of Hyderabad State

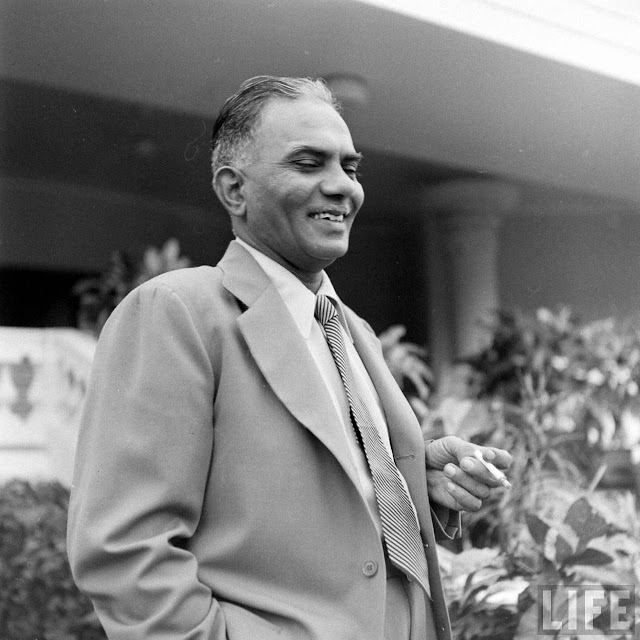
- Mir Laiq Ali during Operation Polo in 1948

Prime Minister of Hyderabad State
- In office 29 November 1947 – 19 September 1948
- Preceded by: Muhammad Ahmad Said Khan Chhatari
- Succeeded by: position abolished by Operation Polo

Personal details
- Born: 1903
- Died: 24 October 1971 (aged 67–68)

Mir Laiq Ali (1903 – 24 October 1971) was the last Prime Minister of Hyderabad State under the rule of the Nizam, Mir Osman Ali Khan. His official title was "President of the Executive Council of the Nizam of Hyderabad".

== Career ==
Mir Laiq Ali was an engineer and an industrialist. He served as the Prime Minister of Hyderabad State from November 1947 until Hyderabad was annexed in Operation Polo by India in September 1948 through a military operation which was called a "police action". During his tenure he struggled to maintain Hyderabad's status as an independent country as a monarchy within the British Commonwealth.

After the defeat of the Hyderabadi defence forces and merger of Hyderabad into the Dominion of India, he was kept under house arrest at his home in Begumpet. In March 1950, he left forever for the Dominion of Pakistan. In Pakistan, he served in the government.

He died in New York on 24 October 1971, while on an official assignment on behalf of Pakistan, and was laid to rest in the holy city of Medina, Saudi Arabia.

== See also ==
- Operation Polo
- Osman Ali Khan, Asif Jah VII

== Bibliography ==
- Tragedy of Hyderabad by Mir Laik Ali

Government offices
Preceded by Nawab Muhammad Ahmad Said Khan Chhatari	Prime Minister of Hyderabad; 1947 - 1948	Succeeded by Operation Polo
