= Hyderabad State Forces =

Historical armed forces of the Hyderabad State

- Sarf-e-khas
- Crest of Hyderabad State Forces

- Flag of Hyderabad State
- Founded: 1724
- Disbanded: 1948
- Headquarters: Barkas, Hyderabad

Leadership
- Major general: Syed Ahmed El Edroos (1948)

The Hyderabad State Forces were the armed forces of the princely state of Hyderabad. People from both India and abroad were recruited into the Forces. Among these groups were Arab nationals like Chaush and African nationals like Siddis who now stay in Barkas and A. C. Guards areas of Hyderabad respectively. The Hyderabad cavalry was chiefly composed of Muslim castes such as Mughals, Pathans, Syeds, Sheikhs and Balochs. They were principally recruited from the Deccan Plateau, but Delhi, Lucknow, Shahjahanpur, Sindh and Balochistan also supplied recruits to bolster ranks. These non-indigenous soldiers were known as the "Rohollas". The Hindus made a very small portion of the cavalry. The Nizam of Hyderabad also had about 1200 Sikh guards. Other battalions within the army were referred to with the suffix "-walas". Some troops were also supplied by the Europeans for the security of the Nizam.

== Commanding divisions ==
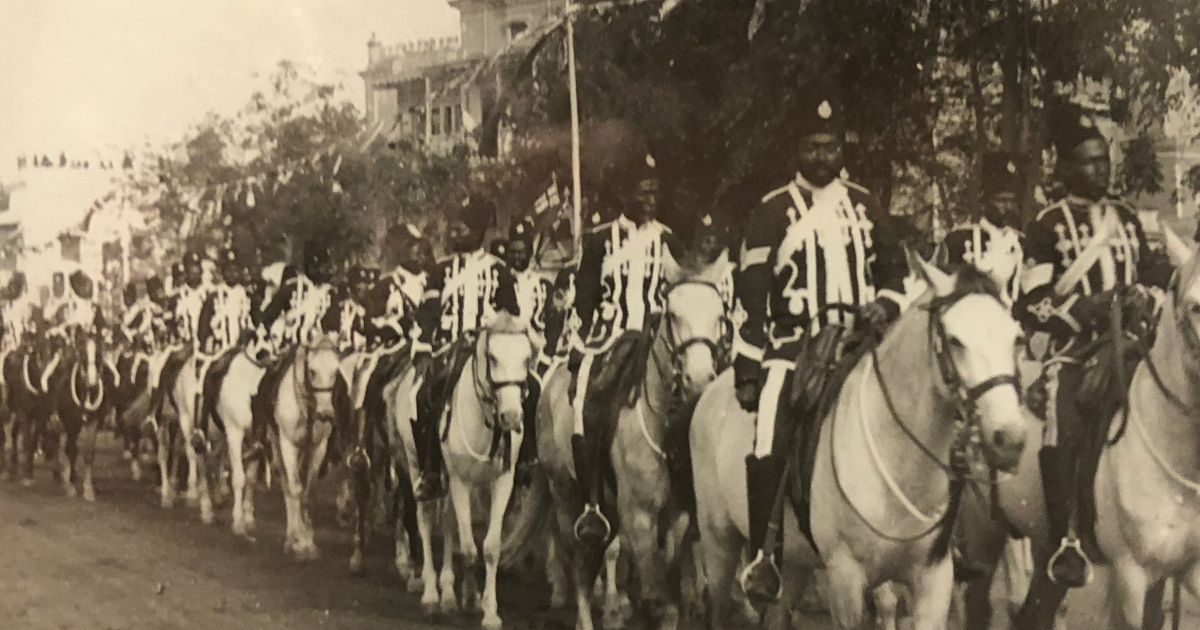
Procession of African Cavalry Guards of Hyderabad

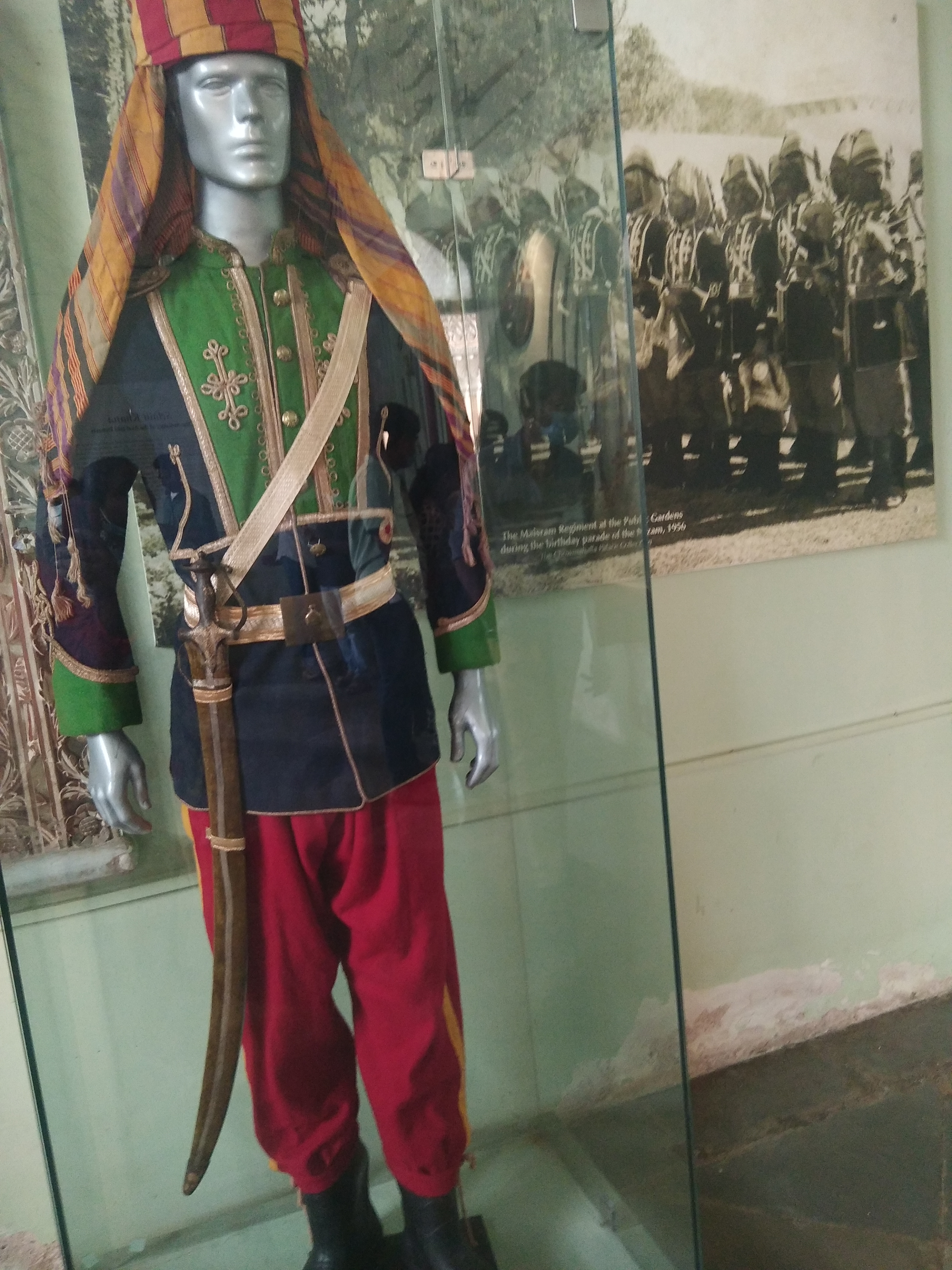
Model uniform of Nizam army

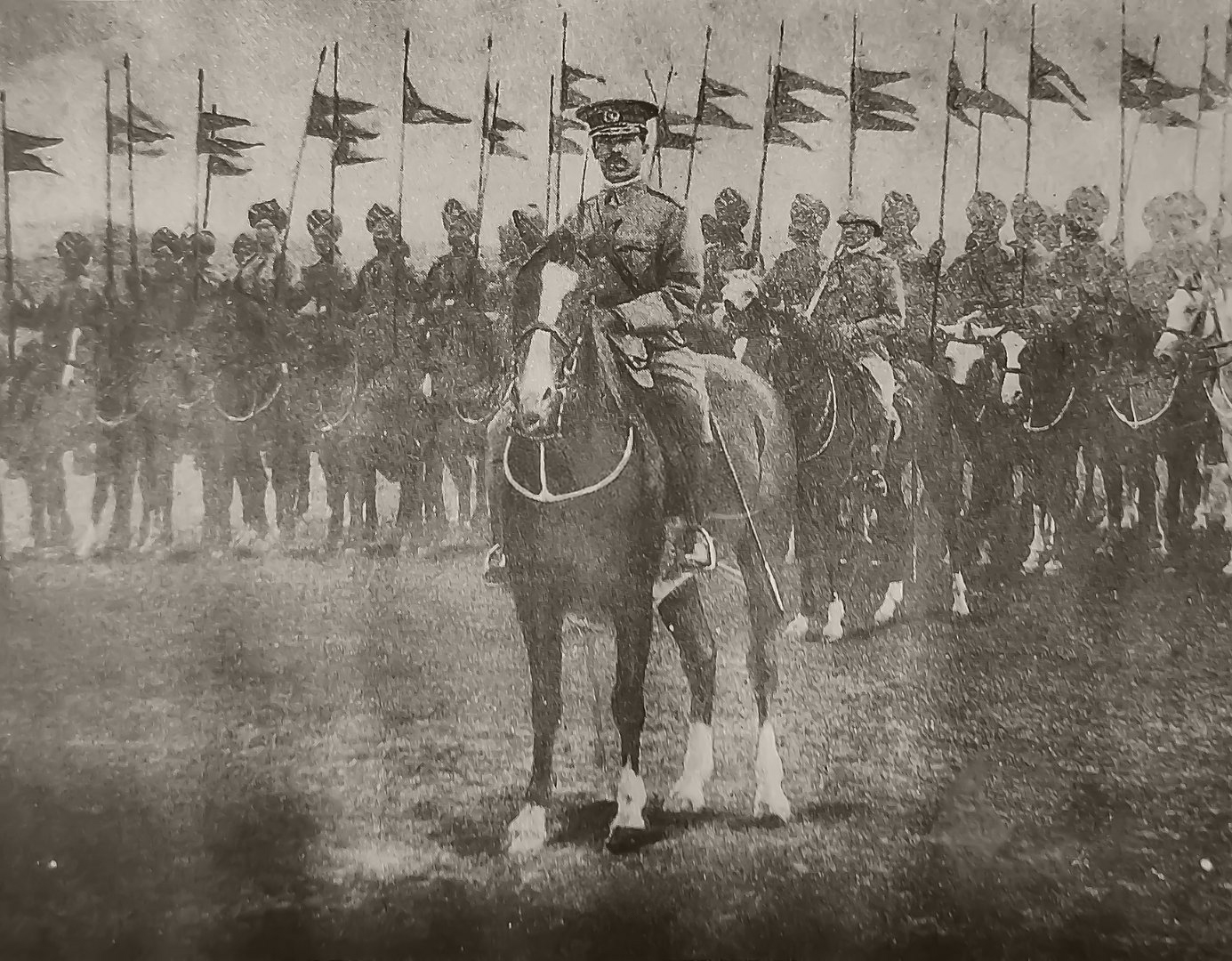
Mir Osman Ali Khan Asaf Jah VII leading a military parade at the Golconda Garrison, 1939

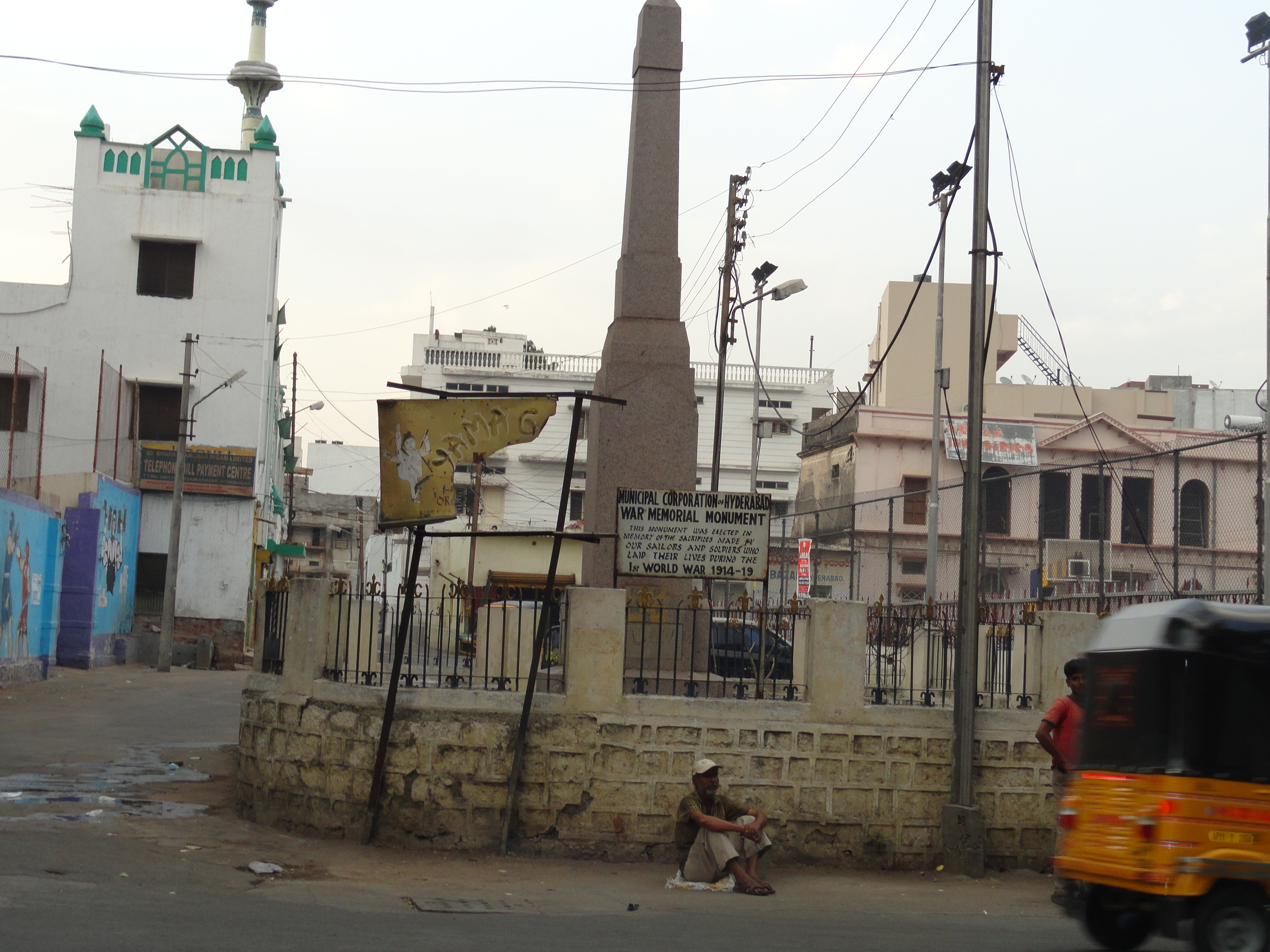
Monument to soldiers from Hyderabad who fought in World War 1 at Chaderghat

Three different corps were commanded by three different independent commanders. The Nizam, the Diwan, and an important officer in the Nizam's government, Shangal Umara or "Amin Kabir", each maintained their own separate divisions.

During the time of Operation Polo, the Hyderabad State Forces consisted of six infantry battalions, two Cavalry regiments, and 1,500 armed irregulars. The army had two light armored regiments and one field battery. In total, the Nizam's army numbered 24,000 men, of whom some 6,000 were fully trained and equipped. Some of the units surrendered on the first two days of the Operation. Four Hyderabadi infantry companies and three cavalry squadrons were later absorbed into the Maratha Light Infantry, Madras Regiment, Poona Horse and Deccan Horse of the Indian Army, respectively.

== History ==
=== British rule ===
In 1767–1768, Nizam ʿĀlī accepted British Suzerainty over Hyderabad State by the Treaty of Masulipatam. From 1778 onwards, a British resident and subsidiary force were installed in his dominions. Nizam ʿĀlī Khan, Asaf Jah 2 was forced to enter into an agreement that placed his country under British protection in 1798.

Nizam ʿĀlī Khan and his soldiers fought for the British in the Second (1803–05) and Third (1817–19) Maratha Wars, and Nizam Nāṣir al-Dawlah and Hyderabad's military contingent remained loyal to the British during the Sepoy Mutiny (1857–58).

=== Role in World War I ===
During World War I, Nizam's Hyderabad Cavalry was a part of the 15th Cavalry Brigade, which was drawn from various princely states of British India. The Hyderabad Lancers along with those from armies from other princely states were deployed in battles at Haifa against German-Ottoman troops. Soldiers from Hyderabad were also posted in Jordan, Jerusalem, Gaza, Suez Canal and Aleppo as part of Sinai and Palestine campaign. A memorial to these soldiers was built at Chaderghat in 1920. Representatives of belligerent and allied nations visit this memorial on Remembrance Day to pay their respects to the soldiers who had participated in World War 1

=== Operation Polo ===
In September 1948, the Indian Army invaded Hyderabad State. The battle between the Nizam's army and the Indian Army lasted for five days; it ultimately ended with a decisive Indian victory. On Day 5 of this operation - 17 September 1948, the 7th Nizam announced a ceasefire, ending armed action. As a result, Hyderabad was integrated into the Indian Union

== See also ==
- Nizam's Contingent
- Imperial Service Troops
- 15th (Imperial Service) Cavalry Brigade
