= Lal Qila (disambiguation) =

Lal Qila is another name for the Red Fort in Delhi, India. It may also refer to:

== Delhi, India ==
- Qila Rai Pithora, a different fortified complex from the Red Fort, also in Delhi

Red Fort

- Red Fort Archaeological Museum
- Lal Qila metro station of the Delhi Metro system
- Red Fort trials, British trials by courts-martial of the Indian National Army of Subhas Chandra Bose
- Lal Quila (1960 film), a 1960 Indian film by Nanabhai Bhatt

== Others ==
- Lal Qila (Agra), Agra, Uttar Pradesh, India
- Lal Qila, Lower Dir, a town in Khyber Pakhtunkhwa, Pakistan
- Lal Qilla Tehsil, tehsil in Khyber Pakhtunkhwa, Pakistan

== See also ==
- Exercise Lal Qila, a military exercise conducted by the Indian Army
- Lal Quila Express, a train of the Indian Railways
