= Indian Army United Nations peacekeeping missions =

Indian Forces in UN missions

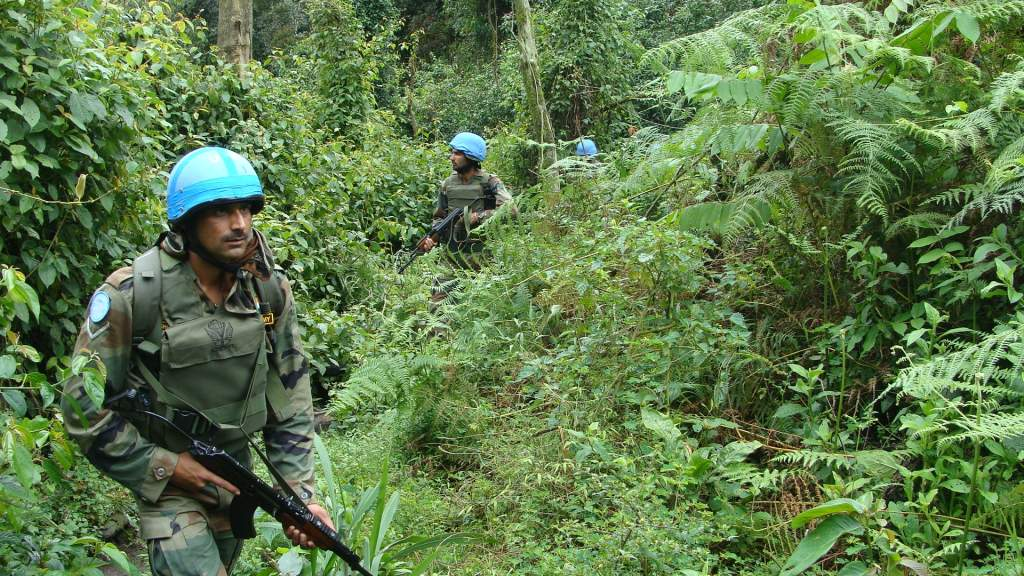
Indian soldiers patrol under UN mission in Congo, Africa

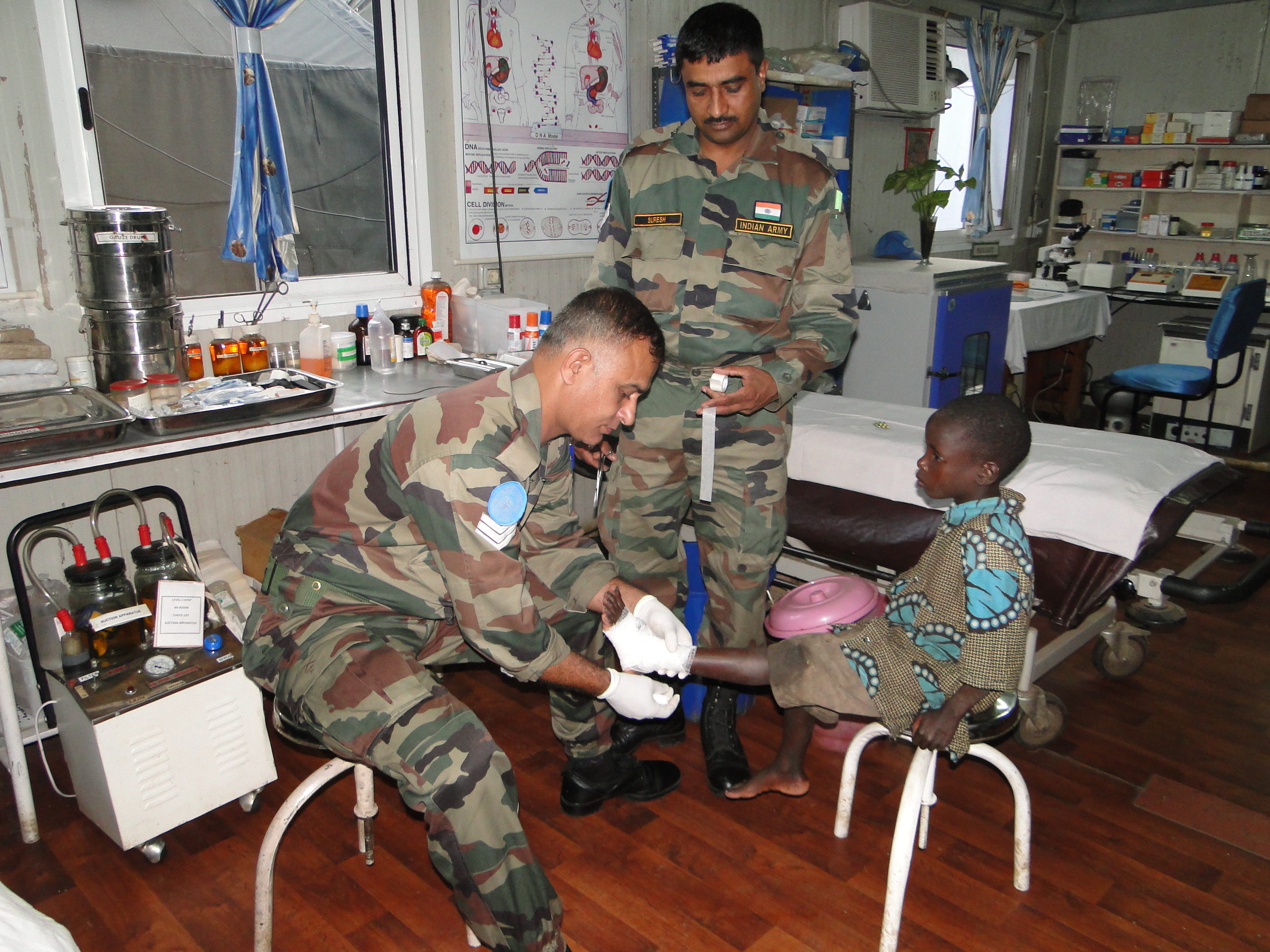
Indian Army medics attend to a child in Congo

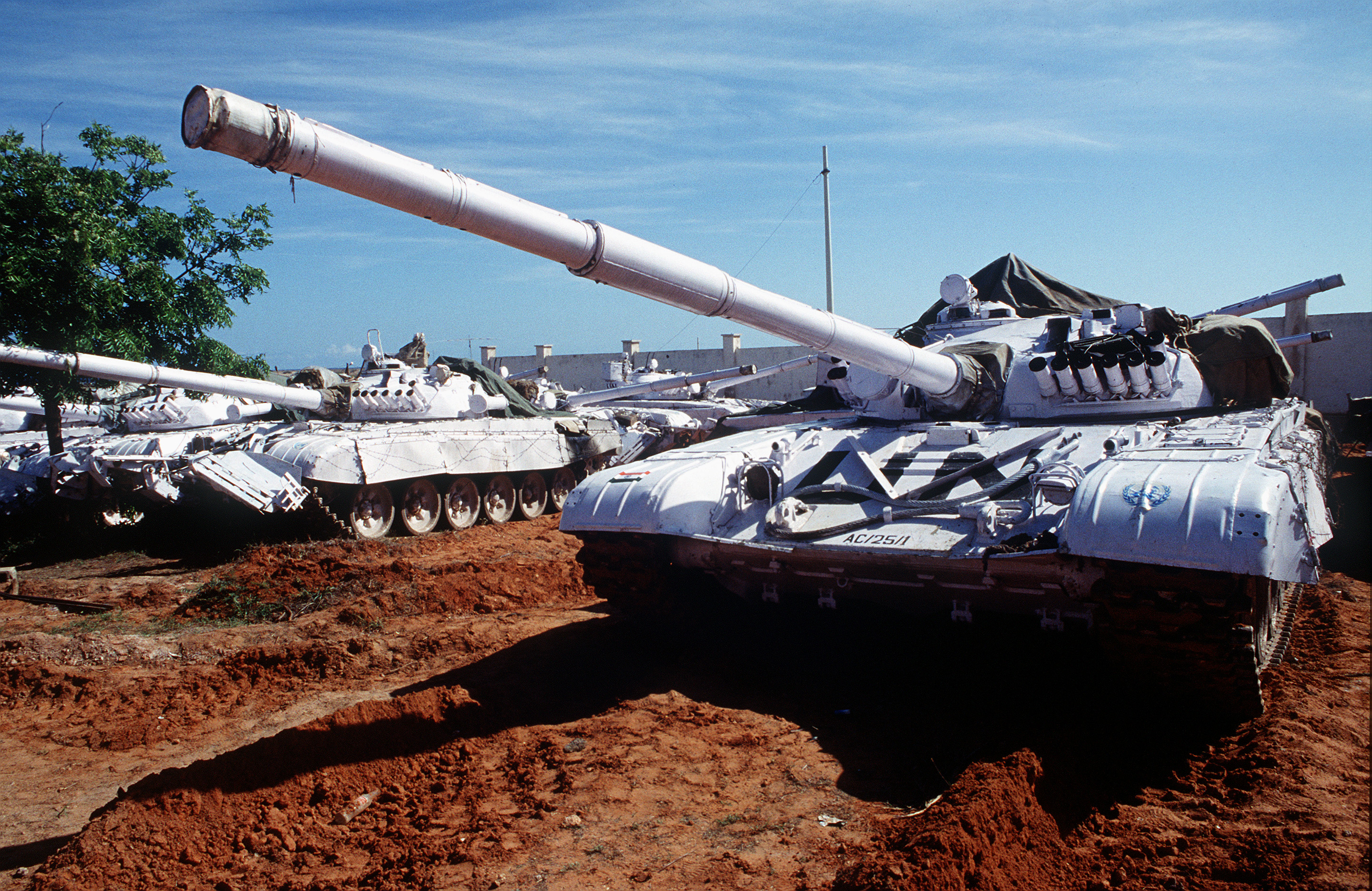
Indian Army T-72 tanks with UN markings as part of Operation Continue Hope

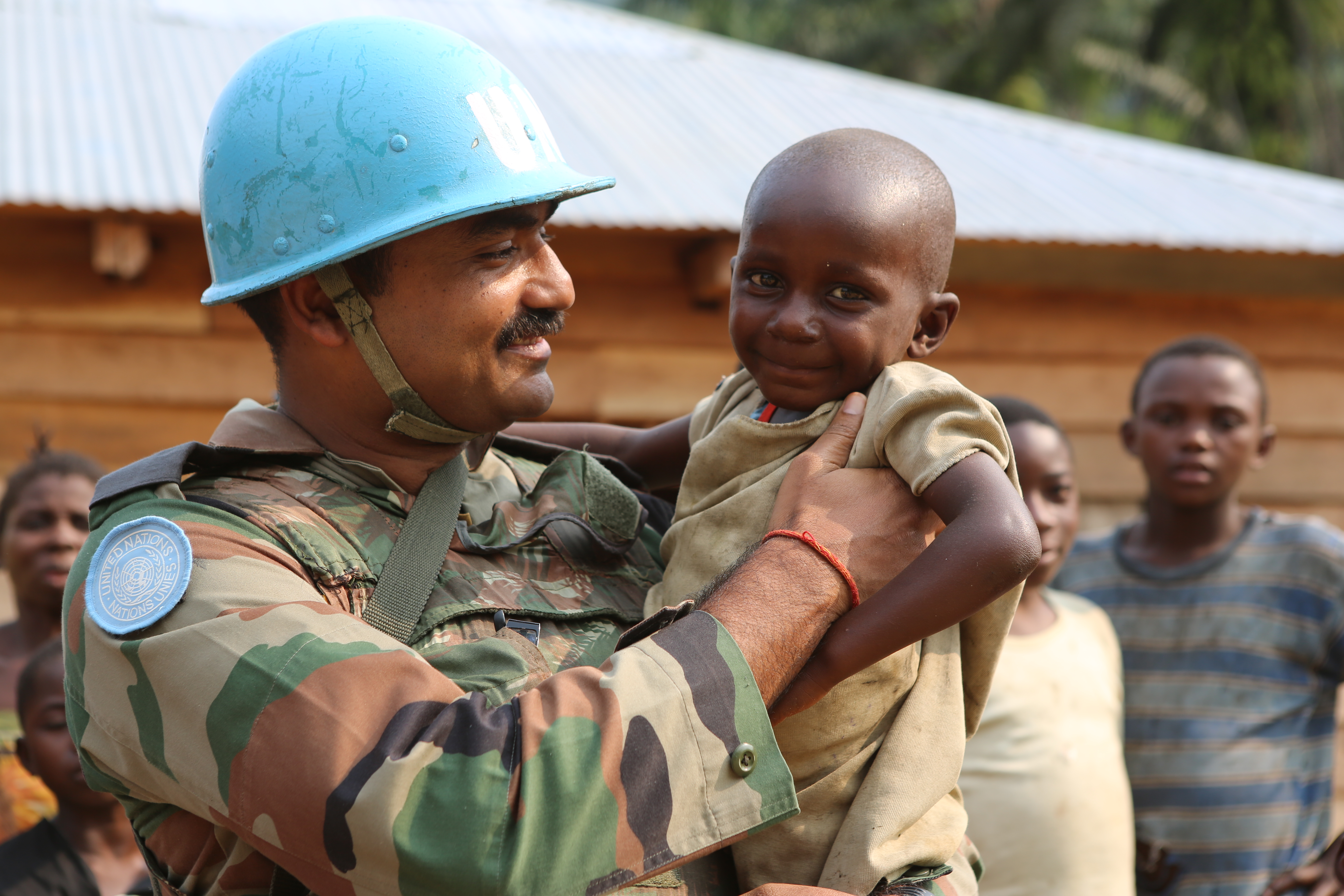
Indian Peacekeeper with a child in Congo (for MONUSCO mission), 2000.

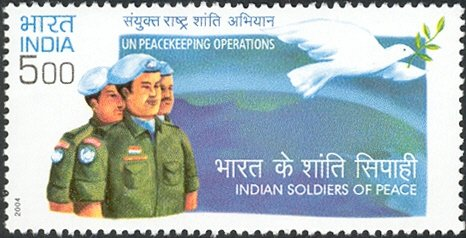
2004 Postal Stamp on the 'Indian Army UN Peacekeeping Operations'

India has taken part in more than 49 Peacekeeping missions with a total contribution exceeding 200,000 troops and a significant number of police personnel. As of September 2022, more than 160 Indian peacekeepers have died while serving under the UN flag.

In 2014, India was the third-largest contributor to United Nations peacekeeping operations, deploying 7,860 personnel across ten missions, including military troops and police units. India has also contributed the first Female Formed Police Unit under the UN.

As of December 31, 2023, India deployed 5,901 military personnel, ranking first among troop-contributing countries, according to data from the Stockholm International Peace Research Institute (SIPRI).

India remained the largest overall contributor in 2024, with deployments across 12 UN peacekeeping missions. Indian peacekeeping units have participated in peacekeeping missions such as the United Nations Mission in South Sudan, where two Indian soldiers were killed during operations.

India has so far, provided two Military Advisors (Brig. Inderjit Rikhye and Lt Gen R K Mehta), two Police Advisers (Ms Kiran Bedi), one Deputy Military Adviser (Lt Gen Abhijit Guha), 14 Force Commanders and numerous Police Commissioners in various UN Missions. Indian Army has also contributed lady officers as Military Observers and Staff Officers apart from them forming part of Medical Units being deployed in UN Missions. The first all women contingent in peacekeeping mission, a Formed Police Unit from India, was deployed in 2007 to the UN Operation in Liberia (UNMIL). Lt Gen Satish Nambiar, a former Indian Army Lieutenant General served as the United Nations Protection Force commander from March 1992 to March 1993. He also served on the "High-level Panel on Threats, Challenges and Change" of the Peacebuilding Commission.

India was reappointed to the Organizational Committee of the Peacebuilding Commission in December 2010, for a third 2-year term. India is supportive of nationally led plans for peace consolidation, while arguing for a constructive approach and a "lighter touch" by the Peacebuilding Commission in extending advice, support and in extending its involvement. India has also been contributing to the United Nations Peacebuilding Fund.

== Past missions ==
The following are the Indian contributions to the United Nations Peacekeeping Missions since 1950.

(a) Korea (1950–54): 60th Indian Field Ambulance, a Parachute-trained Medical Unit composed of 17 officers, 9 JCOs and 300 other ranks was deployed in the Korean War from November 1950 till July 1954, the longest tenure by any unit under the UN flag. Apart from the unit's primary role, an ADS and a surgical team comprising seven officers and five other ranks participated in Operation Tomahawk, and airborne operation by the 187 Airborne Regimental Combat Team on 21 March 1951. The unit was awarded citations by the chiefs of the US 8th Army and the ROK Army, a special mention in the House of Lords in London, commendations by commanders of various formations the unit was part of, individual honours included four US Bronze Stars, two Mahavir Chakras, six Vir Chakras and 25 Mention-in-Despatches. The unit was also awarded the President's Trophy on 10 March 1955 by the then President of India, Dr. Rajendra Prasad, the only one to be awarded till date. Towards the end of the war in 1953, India also provided the Custodian Force of India under Major General S.P.P. Thorat comprising 231 officers, 203 JCOs and 5696 other ranks. Lt-Gen. K S Thimmayya was appointed as the Chairman of the Neutral Nations Repatriation Commission set up by UN.

(b) Indo-China (1954–70): India provided an Infantry Battalion, 2nd Bn., Guards Regiment, and field teams to support the International Control Commission in Indo-China, comprising three states of Vietnam, Cambodia and Laos. Tasks included monitoring, ceasefire and repatriation of prisoners of war, among others. A total of 970 officers, 140 JCOs and 6157 other ranks were provided during the period from 1954 to 1970.

(c) Middle East (1956–67): India was part of the United Nations Emergency Force (UNEF), where for the first time armed troop contingents were deployed. India's contribution was an infantry battalion and other support elements. Over a period of 11 years, 393 officers, 409 JCOs and 12383 other ranks took part in the operations.

(d) Congo (1960–64) (ONUC): Two infantry Brigades composed of 467 officers, 401 JCOs and 11354 other ranks participated and conducted operations. A flight of six Canberra bomber aircraft of the IAF also participated in the operations. 39 personnel of the Indian contingent laid down their lives. Capt GS Salaria was awarded posthumously the Paramvir Chakra for action in Katanga, Southern Congo.

(e) Cambodia (1992-1993): United Nations Transitional Authority in Cambodia was set up to supervise ceasefire, disarm combatants, repatriate refugees and monitor conduct of free and fair elections. A total of 1373 peacekeepers from all ranks of the Indian Army participated.

(f) Mozambique (1992–94) (ONUMOZ): Two Engineer companies, HQ company, logistics company, staff officers and military observers were provided. In all 1083 peacekeepers from all ranks participated.

(g) Somalia (1993–94) (UNITAF & UNOSOM II): The Indian Navy and Indian Army took active part in UN Operations. Indian Army deployed a Brigade Group composed of 5000 personnel from all ranks and the navy deployed four warships.

(h) Rwanda (1994–96) (UNAMIR): An Infantry Battalion group, a signal company, and engineer company, staff officers and Military Observers were provided. Total of 956 from all ranks took part. Brigadier Shiva Kumar of the Indian Army (Acting) was the third and final Force Commander of UN troops serving in Rwanda from December 1995-March 1996.

(i) Angola (1989-1999) (UNAVEM): Besides providing a Deputy Force Commander, an Infantry Battalion group and an engineer company comprising a total of 1014 from all ranks. India contributed 10 military observers for UNAVEM I, 25 for UNAVEM II and 20 military observers, 37 SOs, and 30 senior NCOs for UNAVEM III.

(j) Sierra Leone (1999-2001) (UNAMSIL): Two Infantry Battalion groups, two engineer companies, Quick reaction company, Attack helicopter unit, medical unit and Logistic support in addition to sector HQ and Force Headquarters staff were provided.

(k) Ethiopia-Eritrea (2006–08) (UNMEE): Indian contribution comprised one infantry battalion group, one construction engineer company and one force reserve company, apart from staffing at various HQs and military observers.

(l) Ivory Coast (UNOCI) (2004-2017): The mission was supported by Indian staff officers (SOs) and military observers.

(m) Haiti (MINUSTAH) (1997-2017): Apart from three Indian Formed Police Unit (FPU) there, i.e. from CISF, CRPF and Assam Rifles, which were successful, the mission was supported by Indian Army staff officers.

(n) Liberia (UNMIL) (2007-2018): India had contributed both male and female Formed Police Units from CRPF and its Specialized unit RAF in Liberia. The Female Formed Police Unit (FPU) especially became an inspiration for the women of the host nation and were trendsetters for other such female FPUs across the Globe. Mr Gautam Sawang of India was the final acting Police Commissioner there.

== Current missions ==
As of 19th December, 2025, Indian Armed Forces are currently undertaking the following UN Missions:

Acronym	Name	Country/region	No. of personnel deployed
UNMISS	Mission in South Sudan	South Sudan	2416
MONUSCO	Stabilization Mission in the Democratic Republic of the Congo	DR Congo	1084
UNIFIL	Interim Force in Lebanon	Israel / Lebanon	898
UNISFA	Interim Security Force for Abyei	Sudan / South Sudan	597
UNDOF	Disengagement Observer Force	Israel / Syria	197
MINUSCA	Multidimensional Integrated Stabilization Mission in the Central African Republic	Central African Republic	6
MINURSO	Mission for the Referendum in Western Sahara	Western Sahara	4
UNTSO	Truce Supervision Organization	Middle East	2
UNFICYP	Peacekeeping Force in Cyprus	Cyprus	1
UNFICYP	Transitional Assistance Mission in Somalia	Somalia	1

(a) Lebanon (UNIFIL) (Since Dec 1998): One infantry battalion group, Level II Hospital comprising 650 peacekeepers from all ranks and 23 staff officers till date, have been deployed. The current situation in the Mission is tense and volatile due to the crises in Syria. UNIFIL's mandate is renewed by United Nations Security Council annually. Current mandate expires on 31 August 2014.

(b) Congo (MONUSCO) (Since January 2005): Extended Chapter VII mandate with Augmented Infantry Brigade Group (four infantry battalions with level III Hospital), Army aviation contingent with utility helicopters along with a large number of military observers and SOs have been contributed. In addition, two Formed Police Units (FPU) ex BSF and ITBP have also been deployed since 2009. Lt Gen Chander Prakash of India, was, till recently the Force Commander in MONUSCO. MONUSCO's new mandate vide Resolution 2098 (2013) has been implemented with an Intervention Brigade provided by AU, deployed under UN Command. The FARDC along with the support of MONUSCO were able to destroy the M-23 Rebel Group, however the situation continues to be volatile and uncertain due to the presence of other armed groups. The ex- CDS of India, late Bipin Rawat once commanded a MONUSCO brigade.

(c) South Sudan (UNMISS) (Since April 2005): Two Infantry Battalion groups, sector HQ, Engineer company, signal company, Level-II Hospital and a large number of military observers and staff officers (SOs) have been deployed. The mission has a Deputy Force Commander Brig Asit Mistry (Indian Army) and until recently a Deputy Police Commissioner Mr Sanjay Kundu (Indian Police Service) was also present there. The latest political developments in the Mission led to widespread inter-tribe violence and large displacement of locals. In the ensuing intra state conflict two Indian Peacekeepers lost their lives while ensuring Protection of Civilians. The current situation continues to be highly volatile and sporadic clashes between the tribes are being reported regularly.

(d) Golan Heights (UNDOF) (Since February 2006): A Logistics battalion with 190 personnel has been deployed to look after the logistics security of UNDOF. Maj.Gen. I.S. Singha is the Force Commander since July 2012. Current crisis due to Syrian conflict has impacted the mission and exchange of fire between the Syrian Forces and the armed groups have put the Peacekeepers in grave danger.

== See also ==
- Indian Armed Forces
- Indian Army
- List of wars involving India (1950–present)
- United Nations peacekeeping
- India and the United Nations
