= Korean Armistice Agreement =

1953 end to Korean War hostilities

Coordinates: 37.9611°N 126.6645°E

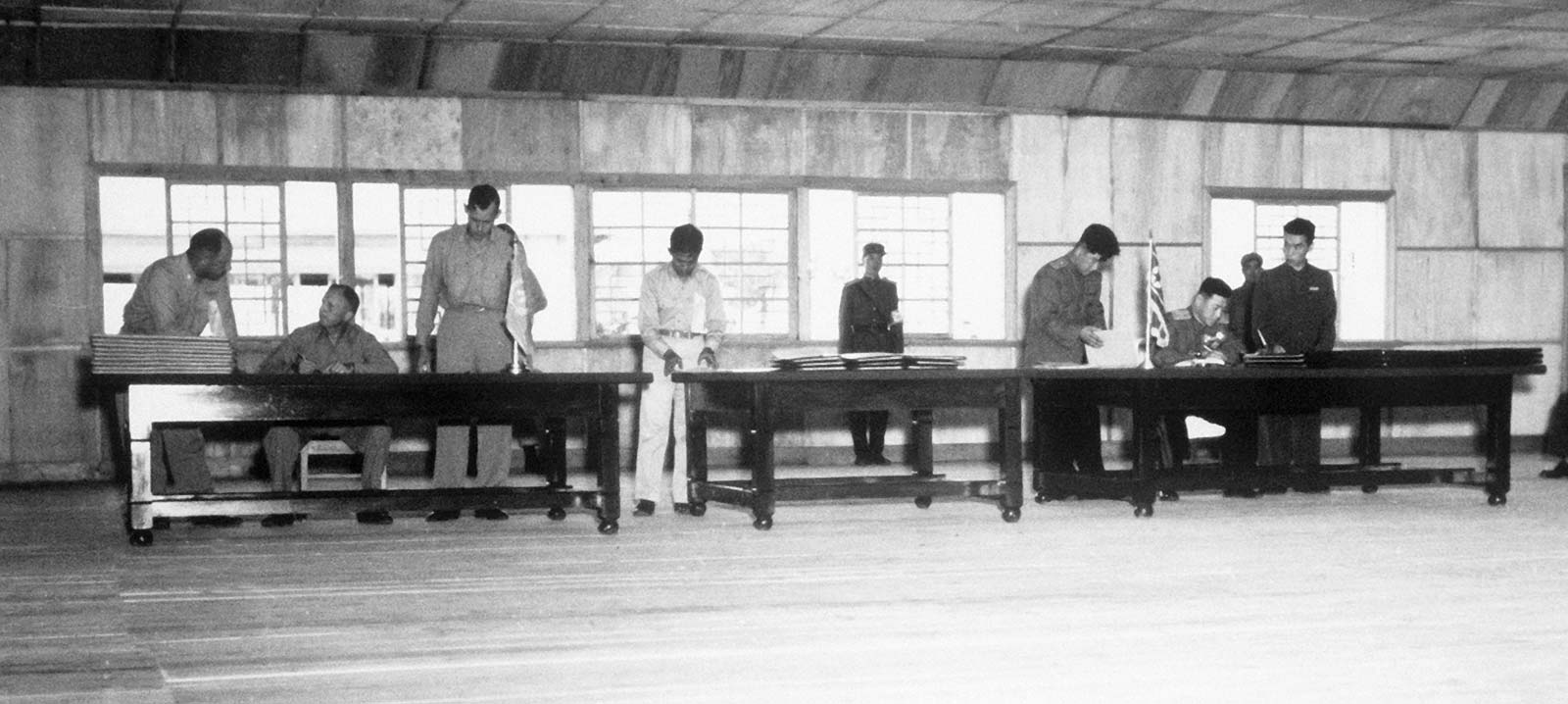
- Delegates of both belligerent sides signing the Korean Armistice Agreement in Panmunjom, marking the beginning of the still-existing ceasefire between the two Koreas
- Type: Armistice
- Signed: 27 July 1953
- Location: Panmunjom, Korea
- Signatories: William K. Harrison; Mark W. Clark; (North Korea) Nam Il; (North Korea) Kim Il Sung; Peng Dehuai
- Parties: United Nations Command; Korean People's Army; Chinese People's Volunteer Army
- Languages: English, Korean, Chinese

The Korean Armistice Agreement (Korean: 한국정전협정; Hanja: 韓國停戰協定) is an armistice that brought about a cessation of hostilities of the Korean War. It was signed by United States Army Lieutenant General William Harrison Jr. and General Mark W. Clark representing the United Nations Command (UNC), North Korea leader Kim Il Sung and General Nam Il representing the Korean People's Army (KPA), and Peng Dehuai representing the Chinese People's Volunteer Army (PVA). The armistice was signed on 27 July 1953, and came into force at 22:00 local time (UTC+09:00) the same day and was designed to "ensure a complete cessation of hostilities and of all acts of armed force in Korea until a final peaceful settlement is achieved."

During the 1954 Geneva Conference in Switzerland, Chinese Premier and foreign minister Zhou Enlai suggested that a peace treaty should be implemented on the Korean peninsula. However, the US secretary of state, John Foster Dulles, did not accommodate this attempt to achieve such a treaty. A final peace settlement has never been achieved. The signed armistice established the Korean Demilitarized Zone (DMZ), the de facto new border between the two nations, put into force a ceasefire, and finalized repatriation of prisoners of war. The DMZ runs close to the 38th parallel and has separated North and South Korea since the Korean Armistice Agreement was signed in 1953.

South Korea never signed the Armistice Agreement, due to President Syngman Rhee's refusal to accept having failed to unify Korea by force. China normalized relations and signed a peace treaty with South Korea in 1992. In 1994, China withdrew from the Military Armistice Commission, essentially leaving North Korea and the UN Command as the only participants in the armistice agreement. In 2011, South Korea stated that North Korea had violated the armistice 221 times.

== Background ==
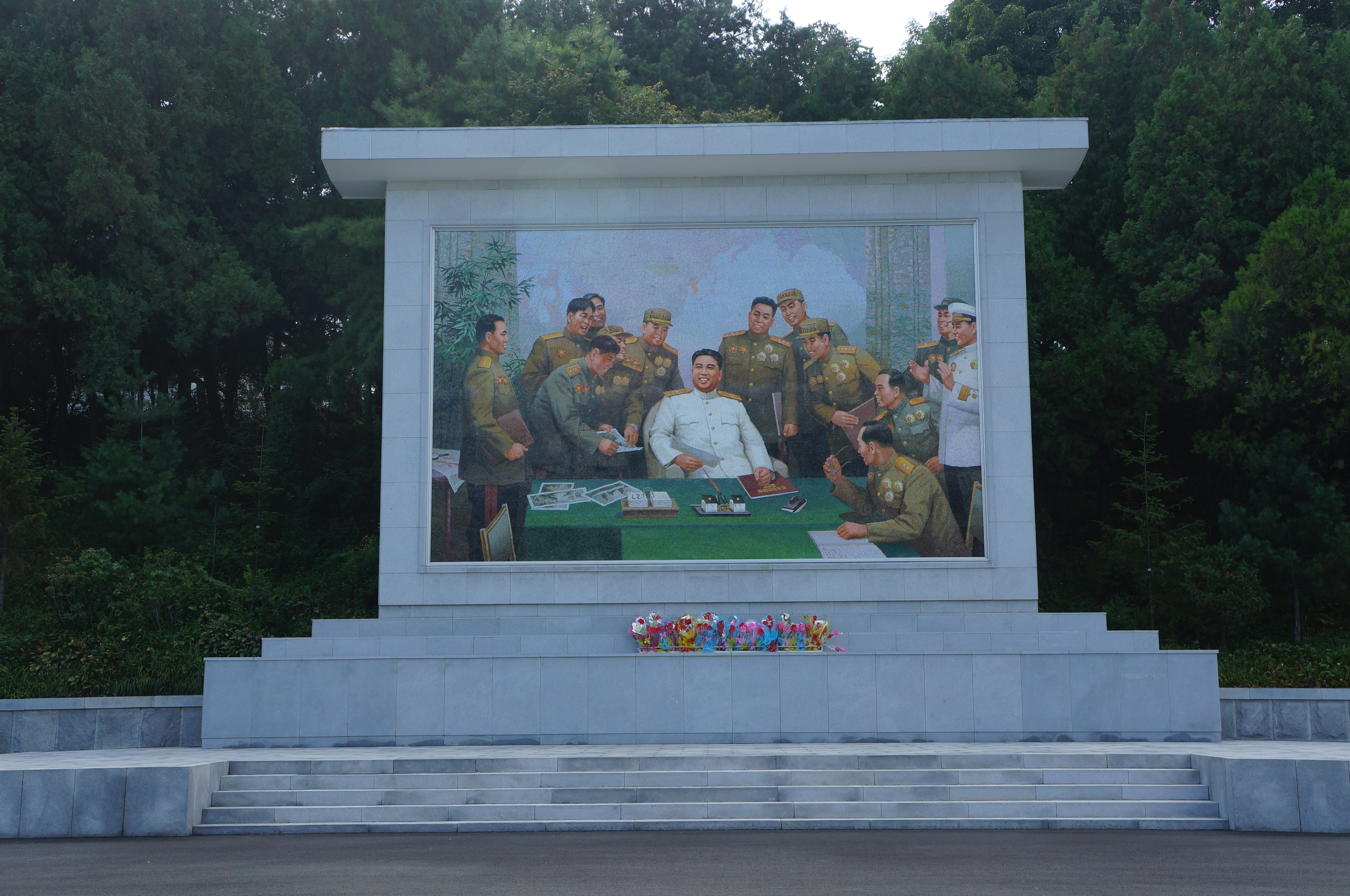
Mosaic depicting Kim Il-sung and KPA generals during Korean War

By mid-December 1950, the United States was discussing terms for an agreement to end the Korean War. The desired agreement would end the fighting, provide assurances against its resumption, and protect the future security of UNC forces. The United States asked for a military armistice commission of mixed membership that would supervise all agreements. Both sides would need to agree to "cease the introduction into Korea of any reinforcing air, ground or naval units or personnel... and to refrain from increasing the level of war equipment and material existing in Korea." The U.S. wished to create a demilitarized zone that would be roughly 20 miles (32 km) wide. The proposed agreement would also address the issue of prisoners of war which the U.S. believed should be exchanged on a one-for-one basis.

While talk of a possible armistice agreement was circulating, in late May and early June 1951, the President of the Republic of Korea (ROK, South Korea) Syngman Rhee opposed peace talks. He believed the ROK should continue to expand its army in order to march all the way to the Yalu River and completely unify the nation. The UNC did not endorse Rhee's position. Even without UNC support, Rhee and the South Korean government attempted to mobilize the public to resist any halt in the fighting short of the Yalu River. Other ROK officials supported Rhee's ambitions and the National Assembly of South Korea unanimously passed a resolution endorsing a continued fight for an "independent and unified country." At the end of June, however, the Assembly decided to support armistice talks, although President Rhee continued to oppose them.

Like Syngman Rhee, North Korean leader Kim Il Sung also sought complete unification. The North Korean side was slow to support armistice talks and only on 27 June 1951 – seventeen days after armistice talks had begun – it did change its slogan of "drive the enemy into the sea" to "drive the enemy to the 38th parallel." North Korea was pressured to support armistice talks by its allies the People's Republic of China and the Soviet Union, whose support was vital to enabling North Korea to continue fighting.

== Negotiations ==
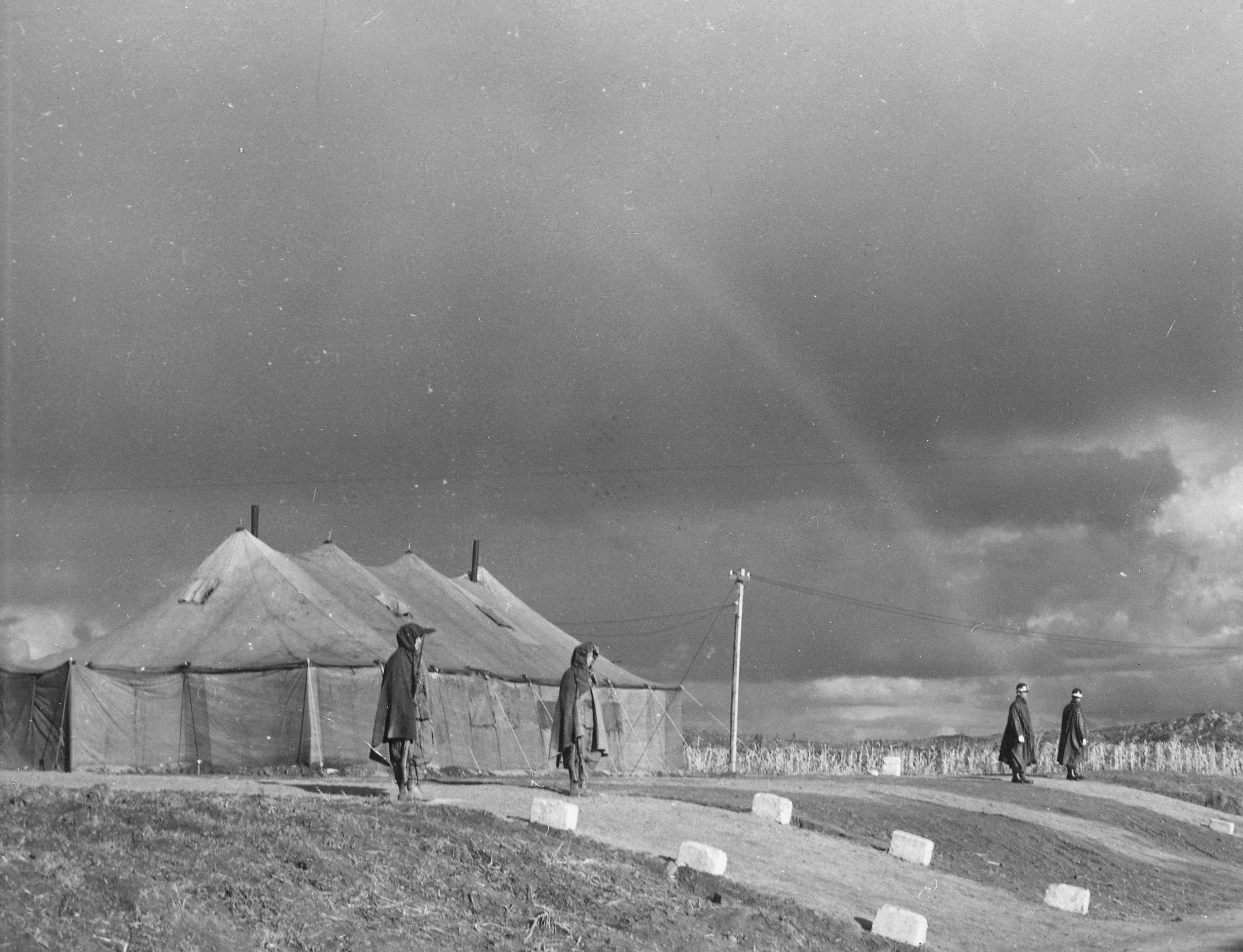
The site of negotiations in 1951

Talks concerning an armistice started 10 July 1951, in Kaesong, a North Korean city in North Hwanghae Province, near the South Korean border. The two primary negotiators were Chief of Army Staff General Nam Il, a North Korean deputy premier, and United States Vice Admiral Charles Turner Joy. After a period of two weeks, on 26 July 1951, a five-part agenda was agreed upon, which guided talks until the signing of the armistice on 27 July 1953. The items to be discussed were:

1. Adoption of an agenda.
2. Fixing a military demarcation line between the two sides to establish a demilitarized zone as a basic condition for the cessation of hostilities in Korea.
3. Concrete arrangements for realization of a ceasefire and armistice in Korea, including the composition, authority, and functions of a supervisory organization to carry out the terms of a truce and armistice.
4. Arrangements relating to prisoners-of-war.
5. Recommendations to the governments of the countries concerned on both sides.

After the agenda was decided, talks proceeded slowly. There were lengthy intervals between meetings. The longest gap between discussions started on 23 August 1951, when North Korea and its allies claimed that the conference site in Kaesong had been bombed. North Korea requested for the UNC to conduct an immediate investigation, which concluded that there was evidence a UNC aircraft had attacked the conference site. The evidence, however, appeared to be manufactured. The communists subsequently refused to permit an investigation during daylight hours. Armistice talks did not start again until 25 October 1951. The US would not allow further discussion to take place in Kaesong. Panmunjom, a nearby village in Kyonggi Province, close to both Koreas, was chosen as the new location for deliberations. That was conditional on responsibility for protection of the village being shared by both powers.

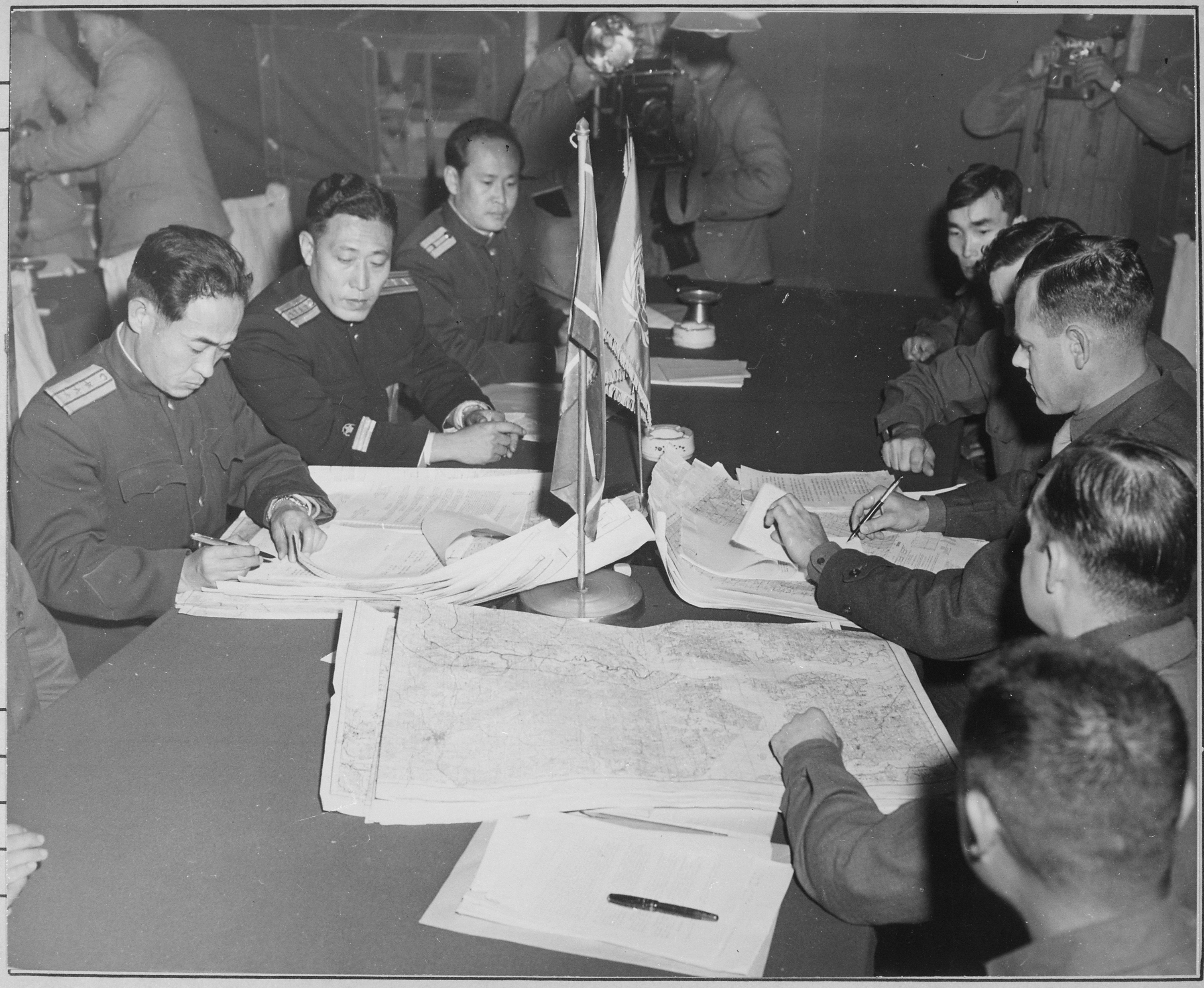
Colonel-level discussions between the US and North Korean militaries on 11 October 1951

A major, problematic negotiation point was the repatriation of prisoners-of-war. The Communists held 10,000, and the UNC held 150,000. The PVA, KPA, and UNC could not agree on a system of repatriation because many PVA and KPA soldiers refused to be repatriated to the north, which was unacceptable to the Chinese and North Koreans. In the final armistice agreement, signed on 27 July 1953, a Neutral Nations Repatriation Commission, chaired by Indian General K. S. Thimayya, was set up to handle the matter.

In 1952, the United States elected a new president, Dwight D. Eisenhower. On 2 December 1952, he went to Korea to investigate what might end the war. Kenneth Nichols wrote that President Eisenhower "ended the Korean hostilities by discreetly threatening to use atomic weapons if the North Koreans and the Chinese did not agree to a cessation of hostilities". With the UN accepting India's proposed NNPC POW exchange framework, the KPA, PVA, and UNC ceased fire with the battle line approximately at the Kansas Line, a line of UN positions north of the 38th parallel, which had been established in Operation Rugged. Upon agreeing to the armistice, the belligerents established the Korean Demilitarized Zone (DMZ), which has since been patrolled by KPA, ROKA, United States, and Joint UNC forces. Discussions continued slowly because of difficulties regarding demarcation of the border between North and South Korea. China and North Korea expected the line to remain at the 38th parallel. Within weeks, however, both nations accepted the Kansas Line. In March 1953, the death of Joseph Stalin helped spur negotiations. While the Chinese leader Mao Zedong was not then willing to compromise, the new Soviet leadership issued a statement two weeks after Stalin's death, which called for a quick end to hostilities.

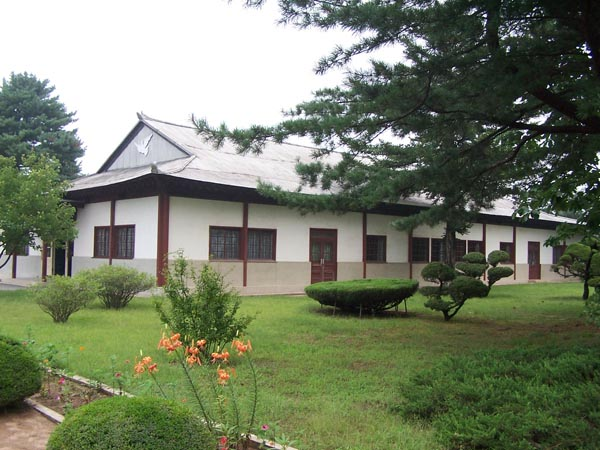
The building in which the armistice was signed now houses the North Korea Peace Museum.

On 19 July 1953, the delegates reached agreement covering all issues on the agenda. On 27 July 1953, at 10:00 a.m., the Armistice was signed by Nam Il, a delegate of the KPA and PVA, and William K. Harrison Jr., a UNC delegate. Twelve hours after the signing of the document, all regulations that were approved in the armistice went into effect. The agreement provided for monitoring by an international commission. The Neutral Nations Supervisory Commission (NNSC) was established to prevent reinforcements being brought into Korea, whether additional military personnel or new weapons, and NNSC member inspection teams from Czechoslovakia, Poland, Sweden, and Switzerland operated throughout Korea.

== Terms ==
The Demilitarized Zone compared to the earlier 38th parallel de facto border

A key feature of the armistice is that no nation is a signatory to the agreement; it is purely a military document. The signed Armistice established a "complete cessation of all hostilities in Korea by all armed forces", which was to be enforced by the commanders of both sides. The armistice is, however, only a ceasefire between military forces, rather than an agreement between governments to normalize relations. No formal peace treaty was signed, and normalized relations were not restored. The armistice established the Military Demarcation Line (MDL) and the DMZ. The DMZ was agreed as a 2.5-mile -wide (4.0 km) fortified buffer zone between the two Korean nations. The DMZ follows the Kansas Line, where the two sides actually confronted each other at the time of the signing of the Armistice. The DMZ is currently the most heavily defended national border in the world as of 2018.

The Armistice also established regulations regarding prisoners-of-war. The agreement stated:

Within sixty (60) days after this agreement becomes effective each side shall, without offering any hindrance, directly repatriate and hand over in groups all those prisoners of war in its custody who insist on repatriation to the side to which they belonged at the time of capture.

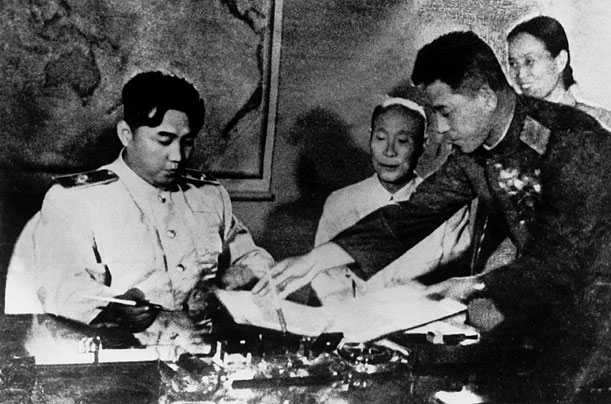
Kim Il Sung signs the agreement

Ultimately, more than 22,000 KPA or PVA soldiers refused repatriation. On the opposite side, only 327 South Korean soldiers, 21 American soldiers, and 1 British soldier also refused repatriation and remained in North Korea or in China. (See list of American and British defectors in the Korean War.)

With the signing of the Armistice, the war ended. Despite the three-year war, the international border remained at a similar location as from before the war.

== Subsequent events ==
=== Failure of the Geneva Conference ===
Article IV (Paragraph 60) of the Armistice Agreement calls for a political conference to be held within three months of the signing of the agreement in order "to ensure the peaceful settlement of the Korean question." A conference was held in Geneva, Switzerland in April 1954, missing the three month timeline by six months. The conference focused on two separate conflicts: the conflict in Korea; and the conflict in Indochina. Participants in the talks on the conflict in Korea were the US, the USSR, France, China, and North and South Korea. The peace agreement on the Korean peninsula was officially raised at the conference, by Chinese diplomat Zhou Enlai with the US Secretary of Defense, John Foster Dulles, but no progress was made. The United States intentionally avoided discussing the "Peace Treaty on the Korean Peninsula," in spite of criticism from the other representatives at the conference about the negative attitude of the United States.

=== United States violation of paragraph 13d ===
Deployment of U.S. atomic weapons in Korea in 1958

Paragraph 13d of the Armistice Agreement mandated that neither side introduce new weapons into Korea, other than piece-for-piece replacement of equipment. In September 1956 the U.S. Chairman of the Joint Chiefs of Staff Admiral Radford indicated that the U.S. military intention was to introduce atomic weapons into Korea, which was agreed to by the U.S. National Security Council and President Eisenhower. Due to an increase in the number of jet fighters (500, up from 0) and jet-ready airfields (25, up from 0) in North Korea, as well as stalled or slow-walked inspections from third party inspection teams the U.S. unilaterally abrogated paragraph 13d, breaking the Armistice Agreement, despite concerns by United Nations allies. At a meeting of the Military Armistice Commission on 21 June 1957, the U.S. informed the North Korean representatives that the United Nations Command no longer considered itself bound by paragraph 13d of the armistice. In January 1958 nuclear armed Honest John missiles and 280mm atomic cannons were deployed to South Korea, followed within a year by atomic demolition munitions and nuclear armed Matador cruise missiles with the range to reach China and the Soviet Union. North Korea believed the U.S. had introduced new weapons earlier, citing NNSC inspection team reports for August 1953 to April 1954. The U.S. believed that North Korea had introduced new weapons contrary to 13d, but did not make specific allegations.

Following the abrogation of paragraph 13d, the NNSC largely lost its function, and became primarily office based in the DMZ with a small staff. North Korea denounced the abrogation of paragraph 13d. North Korea responded militarily by digging massive underground fortifications resistant to nuclear attack, and by the forward deployment of its conventional forces so that the use of nuclear weapons against it would endanger South Korean and U.S. forces as well. In 1963 North Korea asked the Soviet Union and China for help in developing nuclear weapons, but was refused.

=== United Nations statements ===
In 1975, the U.N. General Assembly adopted resolutions endorsing the desirability of replacing the Armistice Agreement with a peace treaty and dissolving the UNC. This was followed by North Korean attempts to start peace discussions with the U.S. The U.S. however believed influencing China to restrict North Korean actions would be more effective.

In October 1996, the U.N. Security Council, by a statement of the President of the Security Council, Honduras, urged that the Armistice Agreement should be fully observed until replaced by a new peace mechanism. Approving nations included the United States and the People's Republic of China, two of the armistice's signatories, effectively refuting any suggestion that the armistice was no longer in force.

=== North Korean announcements to withdraw from the agreement ===
Depiction of a banner during a 1989 student festival in Pyongyang, prior to calls from North Korea to leave the agreement.

North Korea has announced that it will no longer abide by the armistice at least six times, in 1994, 1996, 2003, 2006, 2009, and 2013.

On 28 April 1994, North Korea stated it regarded the U.S. deployment of Patriot missiles in South Korea as terminating the armistice. It also announced that it would cease participating in the Military Armistice Commission, but would continue contact at Panmunjom through liaison officers and maintain the general conditions of the armistice.

On 3 September 1994 China joined North Korea in withdrawing from and ceasing participation in the Military Armistice Commission.

In January 2002 U.S. President George W. Bush, in his first State of the Union Address, labeled North Korea a part of an Axis of Evil. In October 2006 North Korea conducted its first nuclear weapons test. There were two isolated violent incidents in 2010: the ROKS Cheonan sinking, which was attributed to North Korea, despite denials; and the North Korean Bombardment of Yeonpyeong. In 2010, the U.S. position regarding a peace treaty was that it could only be negotiated when North Korea "takes irreversible steps toward denuclearization."

In 2013 North Korea argued that the Armistice was meant to be a transitional measure and that North Korea had made a number of proposals for replacing the armistice with a peace treaty, but the U.S. had not responded in a serious way. It further argued that the Military Armistice Commission and the NNSC had long been effectively dismantled, paralysing the supervisory functions of the Armistice. North Korea believes the annual U.S. and South Korean exercises Key Resolve and Foal Eagle are provocative and threaten North Korea with nuclear weapons. JoongAng Ilbo reported that U.S. vessels equipped with nuclear weapons were participating in the exercise, and the Pentagon publicly announced that B-52 bombers flown over South Korea were reaffirming the U.S. "nuclear umbrella" for South Korea.

In March 2013, North Korea announced that it was scrapping all non-aggression pacts with South Korea. It also closed the border and closed the direct phone line between the two Koreas. North Korea further stated it had the right to make a preemptive nuclear attack. A United Nations spokesman stated that the Armistice Agreement had been adopted by the U.N. General Assembly, and could not be unilaterally dissolved by either North Korea or South Korea. On 28 March 2013, the U.S. sent two B-2 Spirit stealth bombers to South Korea to participate in ongoing military exercises in the region, including the dropping of inert munitions on a South Korean bomb range. This was the first B-2 non-stop, round-trip mission to Korea from the United States. Following this mission, North Korean state media announced that it was readying rockets to be on standby to attack U.S. targets. In May 2013, North Korea offered to enter into negotiations for a peace treaty to replace the armistice agreement.

In August 2016, North Korea installed anti-personnel mines to prevent the defection of its front-line border guards around the Bridge of No Return, situated in the Joint Security Area (JSA). The UN Command protested this move as it violates the Armistice Agreement which specifically prohibits armed guards and anti-personnel mines.

In 2016, when North Korea proposed formal peace talks, the U.S. adjusted its position from the pre-condition that North Korea should have already taken "irreversible steps toward denuclearization", to a negotiating stance that includes North Korea halting its nuclear program. The discussions did not take place. A State Department spokesman said that "[North Korea] periodically raise[s] the idea and it never really gets far."

=== Panmunjom Declaration ===
On 27 April 2018, the Panmunjom Declaration for Peace, Prosperity and Unification on the Korean Peninsula was signed by South Korean President Moon Jae-in and the North Korean leader Kim Jong Un which commits the two countries to denuclearization and talks to bring a formal end to conflict. The two leaders agreed to, later in the year, convert the Korean Armistice Agreement into a full peace treaty, formally ending the Korean War after 65 years. The DPRK later called off talks with South Korea scheduled for 16 May, blaming U.S.–South Korean military exercises, and threw the planned 12 June summit into doubt, saying it might not attend if Washington continues to demand it unilaterally abandon its nuclear arsenal. The 2018 North Korea–United States Summit was held in Singapore on 12 June 2018 at Capella Hotel despite previous tensions before the summit. North Korean leader Kim Jong Un and United States President Donald Trump signed a joint declaration that declared the following:

1. The United States and the DPRK commit to establish new U.S.–DPRK relations in accordance with the desire of the peoples of the two countries for peace and prosperity.
2. The United States and the DPRK will join their efforts to build a lasting and stable peace regime on the Korean Peninsula.
3. Reaffirming the April 27, 2018 Panmunjom Declaration, the DPRK commits to work towards the complete denuclearization of the Korean Peninsula.
4. The United States and the DPRK commit to recovering POW/MIA remains including the immediate repatriation of those already identified.

The joint statement also includes Trump's commitment to providing security guarantees to North Korea and that there will be follow-up negotiations between Secretary of State Mike Pompeo and an undetermined high-level North Korean official thereafter.

At the start of a three-day summit with South Korean President Moon Jae-in in Pyongyang, the pair's third meeting of 2018, North Korean leader Kim Jong Un stated that his meeting with Trump "provided geopolitical stability and that he expects more progress in talks between his nation and Washington." Kim also credited Moon with making the "historic" U.S.–DPRK summit in Singapore possible. The third day of the Moon–Kim summit yielded a joint statement from the two leaders announcing an agreement to pursue a co-host bid for the 2032 Olympic Games. Further, the joint statement announced that the two nations will now "participate jointly" at international competitions, including the Tokyo 2020 Olympic Games, although North Korea did not ultimately attend the Tokyo games.

== Commemorations ==
Over the years, United States Presidents have made proclamations in support of the National Korean War Veterans Armistice Day. For instance, following the example of every U.S. president since Eisenhower, on 26 July 2017, President Donald Trump proclaimed 27 July as National Korean War Veterans Armistice Day.

North Korea commemorates 27 July as a national holiday known as Day of Victory in the Great Fatherland Liberation War.

== Gallery ==
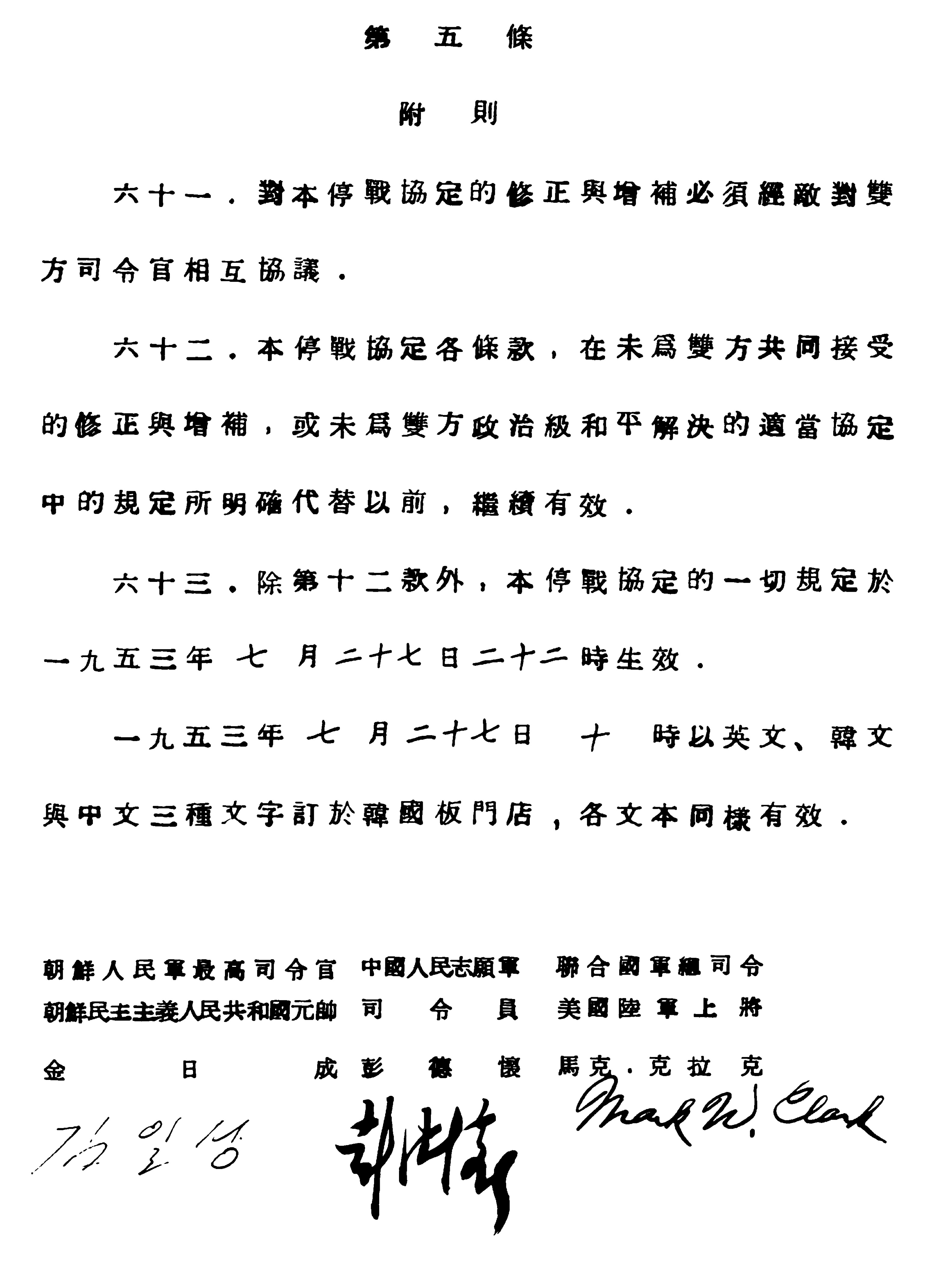
Armistice Agreement in Chinese

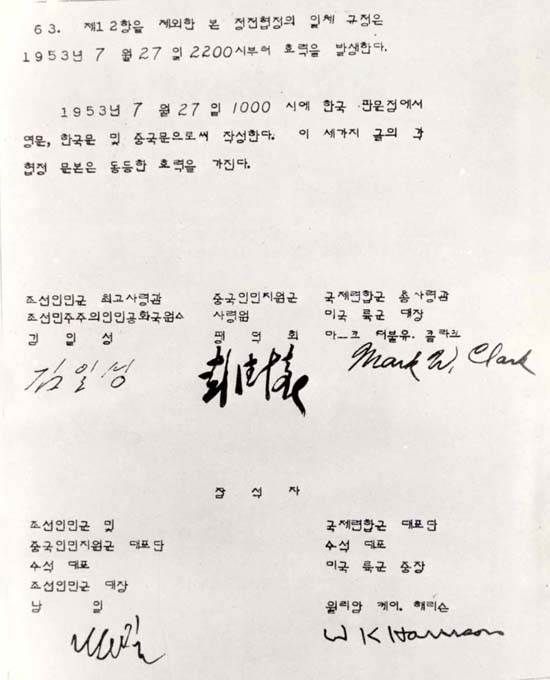
Armistice Agreement in Korean

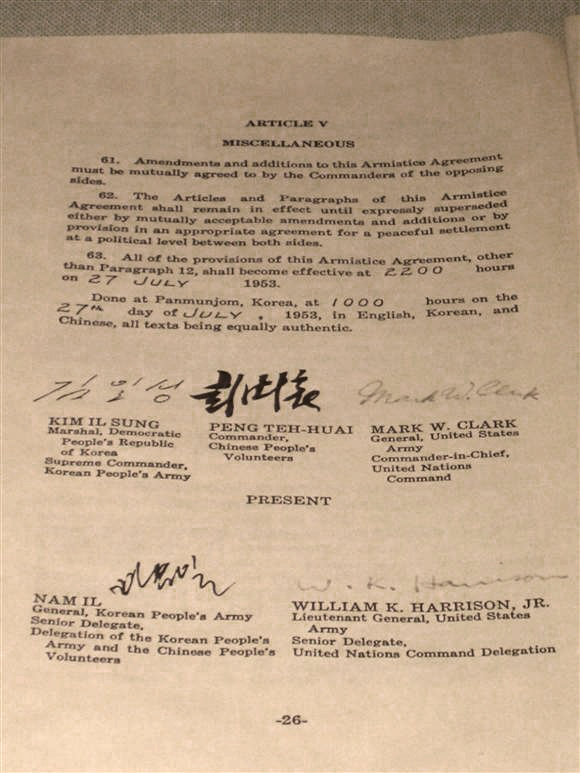
Armistice Agreement in English

== See also ==
- Korean conflict
- Mutual Defense Treaty (United States–South Korea)
- Northern Limit Line
- Korean reunification
- North Korea and weapons of mass destruction
