= Udey =

Udey is both a given name and surname. Notable people with the name include:

- Udey Chand (born 1935), Indian wrestler and wrestling coach
- Udey Chand Dubey (1909–2009), Indian Army general and centenarian
- Mark C. Udey, American biologist
