= Kalwant Singh (Indian Army general) =

Indian general

Lieutenant General Kalwant Singh
- Born: 23 February 1905; Sheikhupura District, Punjab Province, British Raj (now in Pakistan)
- Died: 2 January 1966 (aged 60)
- Military career
- Allegiance: British India; India
- Branch: British Indian Army; Indian Army
- Service years: 1925–1959
- Rank: Lieutenant General
- Service number: IA-556
- Units: Sikh Regiment; 1st Punjab Regiment
- Commands: GOC-in-C, Western Command; GOC, J&K Division; 7/1 Punjab Regiment
- Conflicts: World War II; Burma Campaign; Indo-Pakistani War of 1947
- Awards: Mentioned in dispatches

Lieutenant General Kalwant Singh (23 February 1905 – 2 January 1966) was an Indian Army general.

== Career ==
=== British Indian Army ===
A King's Commissioned Indian Officer (KCIO), Singh was initially educated at Forman Christian College before entering the Royal Military Academy Sandhurst, passing out and receiving his British Indian Army commission on 29 January 1925. Among his batchmates were Sant Singh and Hira Lal Atal, both of whom would also become generals. As was customary for newly commissioned Indian Army officers, Singh, along with his batchmate Atal, were attached to a regular British Army regiment for a year of training, in their case the 1st Battalion Gordon Highlanders (the "Gordons").

Following his attachment to the Gordons, Singh was posted to 2/1 Punjab, then stationed at Kohat, as a company officer on 7 April 1926. Apart from leaves, he remained with the battalion over the following years. By 1931, Singh's fellow company officers included lieutenants Pran Nath Thapar and Thakur Mahadeo Singh, along with second lieutenant Udey Chand Dubey, all of whom would rise to general rank in the independent Indian Army.

In 1935, by then a captain, Singh was among the few Indians to sit the examinations for and to be selected to attend Staff College, Quetta. After completing Staff College, he was appointed staff captain of 2/1 Punjab on 1 November 1938. He was subsequently brigade major of the Thal Brigade through 1941, when he returned to Quetta as an instructor at the Staff College. He was then appointed Assistant Quartermaster-General (Plans) with the Indian Expeditionary Force. From 1943 to 1945, as a temporary lieutenant-colonel, he commanded 7/1 Punjab before appointment as second-in-command of 114 Brigade in Burma. In 1946, he was promoted acting brigadier and commanded a brigade posted in Bangkok. After assisting with the resettlement of refugees, Singh was appointed Brigadier General Staff, Northern Command in June 1947, the first Indian holder of that post.

=== Indian Army ===
Promoted acting major-general and appointed Director of Military Training shortly before Independence, Singh was then given command of the Jammu and Kashmir Division during the Indo-Pakistani War of 1947, for which he was mentioned in dispatches. From 8 May 1948, Singh served as Chief of the General Staff (CGS), receiving promotion to substantive major general on 1 January 1950.

On 3 April 1950, Singh was appointed a corps commander. On 1 September 1953, he was appointed officiating GOC-in_C, Western Command, and was appointed as the regular GOC-in-C of that army command on 15 May 1955, retiring in May 1959.

== Dates of rank ==
Insignia	Rank	Component	Date of rank
	Second Lieutenant	British Indian Army	29 January 1925
	Lieutenant	British Indian Army	29 April 1927
	Captain	British Indian Army	29 January 1934
	Major	British Indian Army	1940 (acting); 8 November 1940 (temporary); 29 January 1942 (substantive)
	Lieutenant-Colonel	British Indian Army	29 January 1942 (acting); 17 April 1943 (temporary)
	Colonel	British Indian Army	17 June 1945 (acting)
	Brigadier	British Indian Army	2 February 1946 (acting)
	Major	Indian Army	15 August 1947 (Note: Upon independence in 1947, India became a Dominion within the British Commonwealth of Nations. As a result, the rank insignia of the British Army, incorporating the Tudor Crown and four-pointed Bath Star ("pip"), was retained, as George VI remained Commander-in-Chief of the Indian Armed Forces. After 26 January 1950, when India became a republic, the President of India became Commander-in-Chief, and the Ashoka Lion replaced the crown, with a five-pointed star being substituted for the "pip.")
	Major-General	Indian Army	2 November 1947 (acting); 1 January 1950 (substantive)
	Major General	Indian Army	26 January 1950 (recommissioning and change in insignia)
	Lieutenant General	Indian Army	3 April 1950 (local); 1 September 1953 (acting); 15 May 1955 (substantive)

== Notes ==
Military offices
Preceded by Kodandera Subayya Thimayya	General Officer Commanding-in-Chief Western Command; 1955–1959	Succeeded by Pran Nath Thapar
Preceded by Kodandera Subayya Thimayya	General Officer Commanding-in-Chief Western Command (officiating); 1953–1954	Succeeded by Kodandera Subayya Thimayya
Preceded by Jayanto Nath Chaudhuri (officiating)	Chief of the General Staff; May 1948–March 1950	Succeeded by S. P. P. Thorat
