= S. P. P. Thorat =

General Officer in the Indian Army (1906 - 1992)

Lieutenant General S. P. P. Thorat KC, DSO
- Born: 12 August 1906; Vadgaon, Kolhapur State, British India (present day Maharashtra, India)
- Died: 10 August 1992 (aged 85)
- Relatives: Rahul Bose (grandson)
- Military career
- Allegiance: British India; India
- Branch: British Indian Army; Indian Army
- Rank: Lieutenant General
- Commands: Eastern Command; XI Corps; 5th Infantry Division; Custodian Force of India; 161 Brigade
- Conflicts: World War II; Burma campaign; Sino-Indian War
- Awards: Kirti Chakra; Padma Shri; Distinguished Service Order

Lieutenant General Shankarrao Pandurang Patil Thorat, KC, DSO (12 August 1906 - 10 August 1992) was a senior General Officer of the Indian Army. He last served as the General Officer Commanding-in-Chief Eastern Command in the lead up to the 1962 Sino-Indian War. He earlier served as the Commander of the Custodian Force of India in the aftermath of the Korean War. He was awarded the Distinguished Service Order for his command of a battalion during WWII.

== Early life ==
Shankarrao Thorat was born on 12 August 1906, in Vadgaon village, Kolhapur State, British India. He studied at Sir Parashurambhau College, Pune and then at the Royal Military College, Sandhurst, from where he commissioned into the British Indian Army as a King's Commissioned Indian Officer (KCIO).

== Military career ==
=== Early career ===
After graduating from Sandhurst, Thorat was placed on the Unattached list for the Indian Army in September 1926 . KCIOs were supposed to serve with a British regiment before being sent to an Indian unit. Thorat was posted to the 2nd battalion, The Middlesex Regiment then stationed at Ahmednagar. After a year-long attachment, in October 1927, he was posted to the 1st battalion, 14th Punjab Regiment (19th Punjabis) in the rank of second lieutenant, with seniority from 30 August 1926. The battalion was in Manzai in the North West Frontier Province (NWFP). The battalion moved to Aurangabad in early 1928 and Thorat was promoted to the rank of lieutenant in November 1928.

Thorat was posted as the adjutant of the Territorial battalion of the 14th Punjab regiment in October 1931, then at Delhi. After around three years, he returned to his battalion and in 1935 appointed quartermaster of the unit. Shortly thereafter, the battalion moved to Peshawar to participate in the Mohmand campaign. Around the same time, in August, he was promoted to the rank of captain. He spent the next two years as a company commander of the Training battalion in Ferozepur, before being posted to Bannu as the adjutant of 1/14th Punjab.

=== World War II ===
In 1940, Thorat was selected to attend the Staff College, Quetta. He graduated the next year and was posted to Army headquarters in the Staff Duties directorate. Anxious to be posted to regimental duty, he was transferred to Rajaram Rifles of Kolhapur State where he served for a year. He was promoted major in August 1943. He subsequently moved to 4/14th Punjab which as part of the 114th Indian Infantry Brigade under the 7th Indian Infantry Division played a role in clearing Japanese forces from the Naga Hills.

Thorat participated in small actions with 4/14th Punjab, and after the Battle of Kohima, he was appointed second in command of 9/14 Punjab under the 20th Indian Infantry Division, which was engaged in fighting on the Imphal plains. The commanding officer of 9/14th Punjab went down with dysentery and Thorat temporarily took command of the battalion. Since it was his first time commanding a battalion, he accompanied his troops on a long reconnaissance patrol, which his brigade commander didn't approve of.

In November 1944, Thorat was appointed commanding officer of the 2nd battalion, 2nd Punjab Regiment under the 51st Indian Infantry Brigade. The CO had been killed in action and Thorat was to take command immediately in Maungdaw in the Arakan. This brigade became known as the "Indian Brigade" because unlike other British Indian Army brigades which were composed of 2 Indian battalions and 1 British battalion, the 51st Brigade had 3 Indian battalions. Additionally, all 3 battalions in the brigade had Indian commanding officers - K.S. Thimayya (8/19th Hyderabad), L. P. Sen (16 Baluch), and Thorat. These 3 were among the few Indian officers above the rank of major who saw intense action during the war.

==== Battle of Kangaw ====
In January 1945, 2/2nd Punjab participated in the Battle of Kangaw. The 51st Brigade had been assigned the task of clearing strongly fortified Japanese rearguard positions, and Thorat coordinated his battalion's attack with artillery and air support. However, the battalion still took heavy casualties as they advanced through rice paddies to close with the Japanese. At one point Thorat engaged in hand-to-hand combat, during which he killed a young Japanese officer and seized his sword. After his initial attack had succeeded, Thorat limited his battalion's advance and consolidated their position of half of the hill feature. He was fully aware of the Japanese tactic of evacuating a position under attack and then swiftly counterattacking to retake it, thus inflicting maximum casualties on their enemy. When the counterattack came, it was repelled by prepared battalion defences and air strikes. For his leadership and gallantry, Thorat was awarded the Distinguished Service Order (DSO) on 15 November 1945.

After the battle, 51st Brigade was sent back to India for rest and refit and 2/2nd Punjab came to Pollachi. After a short stay in India, the battalion was slated to go to Malaya as part of Operation Zipper. With the surrender of Japan, the invasion force turned into a peacetime occupation force. Shortly after taking his battalion to Kuantan, Thorat was appointed Assistant Adjutant and Quartermaster General of the 25th Indian Infantry Division.

In early 1946, 25th Division came back to India to be disbanded. Thorat was promoted to the rank of Colonel and appointed Deputy Director Personnel Services at Army headquarters in Delhi. This was to be a short stint. Later that year, he was appointed Secretary of the National War Academy Committee in the rank of Brigadier, the sixth Indian to be promoted to the rank. During his tenure as Secretary of the Committee, Khadakvasla near Pune was chosen to be the location where the academy would come up. The National War Academy was later renamed National Defence Academy and established in December 1949 in Dehradun before moving to Khadakvasla in 1954. In early 1947, Thorat was appointed Commander of the 161 Brigade in Ranchi.

=== Post-Independence ===
After the Partition of India, Thorat was posted to new Army headquarters at Red Fort as the Director of Staff Duties and Weapons & Equipment in August 1947. The directorate had to sort out and dispatch weapons, ammunition, vehicles and equipment to the newly-formed Dominion of Pakistan. He noted that the arms and ammunition being sent to Pakistan were used by them in the Indo-Pakistani War of 1947 against the Indian forces.

On 31 January 1948, Thorat was promoted to the rank of Major General and appointed General Officer Commanding Delhi Area. As GOC, he commanded the first Independence Day parade in August 1948. The next month, he was appointed GOC East Punjab Area. His major tasks were to consolidate the defences along the Indo-Pak border in the Punjab, to control the refugee movement and aid the civil authorities in settling the evacuee properties. He had four brigades and three sub-areas under him.

=== Custodian Force of India ===
In March 1950, Thorat was appointed Chief of the General Staff. This was a surprising appointment since the CGS was the senior Principal Staff Officer (PSO) at army headquarters and usually filled by a senior lieutenant general. Thorat was junior to other PSOs like the Adjutant General, Quartermaster General and Master-General of the Ordnance (India). The Directors of Military Training and Signals, part of the General Staff branch, both British officers, were themselves senior to Thorat. During his tenure as CGS, the Indian States Forces were integrated with the Indian Army.

=== Custodian Force of India ===
After a three-year tenure, Thorat was appointed General Officer Commanding Custodian Force of India (CFI). In early 1953, in the aftermath of the Korean War, the United Nations had requested India to undertake a peace mission on its behalf to Korea. The CFI was to be the executive agent of the Neutral Nations Repatriation Commission, which was to be headed by Lieutenant General K. S. Thimayya. The force would take custody of all the Prisoners of war of both sides. The CFI had an infantry brigade with four battalions, one company of medium machine guns and a field ambulance apart from the Force headquarters, totalling around 5000 troops.

CFI began to move to Korea in August 1953, established a base christened 'Hindnagar' and took custody of all POWs by September, 27000 in all. Shortly thereafter, on 25 September, mass demonstrations were staged in all compounds housing the POWs. In compound D-31, after a talk by Thorat, Major HS Grewal, a Chinese interpreter was snatched by the crowd. In spite of being heavily outnumbered by the prisoners armed with improvised weapons, Thorat re-entered the compound to rescue Major Grewal. While speaking with the agitated POWs, CFI troops surrounded the compound and were about to fire on the prisoners. Restraining his troops, Thorat induced the POWs to release Major Grewal. For this incident, Thorat was awarded the Ashoka Chakra (Class II) (later renamed Kirti Chakra).

CITATION

Ashoka Chakra Class II

Major General Shankarrao Pandurang Patil Thorat, DSO (AI 536)

On the 25th September 1953 at Hindnagar, Korea, the prisoners of war in their compound No. D-31 turned hostile as they suspected that one of their leaders who had come out of the camp to ask for repatriation had been kidnapped by the Custodian Force of India. Major-General Thorat accompanied by a few officers went into the compound to explain the correct position to the prisoners. No amount of explanation would, however, satisfy them and, as the party of Indian officers was leaving, some of the prisoners grabbed hold of Major H.S. Grewal and dragged him back into the compound. Undaunted by the fact that the prisoners had armed themselves with tent poles, sticks and improvised weapons, Major-General Thorat entered the compound to rescue Major Grewal. By this time the Brigade Commander had sent in a party of 12 men to protect Major-General Thorat. With characteristic composure and admirable presence of mind, Major-General Thorat prevented these men from coming into conflict with the infuriated prisoners whom he managed to induce to release Major Grewal. By this action he not only rescued Major Grewal but also prevented an outbreak of violence which might have caused many deaths.

This act on the part of Major-General Thorat at grave risk to his own life was highly commended by all concerned including the prisoners of war who gave him a Guard of Honour as he finally left the compound. It is in the highest traditions of the Indian Army.

—

By early 1954, the CFI's mandate was completed and the force returned to India. In May that year, Thorat disbanded the CFI and was appointed GOC 5th Infantry Division in Jhansi. He requested command of this division since most of the units of CFI belonged to it. Early next year, he moved the division from Jhansi to Ferozepur in Punjab, as part of XI Corps. A few months later, he was promoted to the rank of Lieutenant General and appointed GOC XI Corps.

=== GOC-in-C Eastern Command ===
Thorat took over the eastern command in 1957. At the time the headquarters of the eastern command was based in Lucknow. It was only in 1959, following incidents such as the Longju incident, when border defence was shifted to the military. Accordingly, Thorat made an assessment of the requirements needed to plug vulnerabilities and repel a Chinese invasion. In October 1959, Thorat's plan was sent to General Thimayya who in turn showed it to the Defence Minister VK Krishna Menon. Menon dismissed the report. Exercise Lal Qila was conducted on 17 March 1960 at the Eastern Command Headquarters under Lieutenant General Thorat. It was another attempt to show the serious vulnerabilities in the eastern sector. It detailed the threat from China and what India needed to do to plug vulnerabilities.

== Dates of rank ==
Insignia	Rank	Component	Date of rank
	Second Lieutenant	British Indian Army	30 August 1926
	Lieutenant	British Indian Army	30 November 1928
	Captain	British Indian Army	30 August 1935
	Major	British Indian Army	1940 (acting); 18 November 1940 (temporary); 30 August 1943 (substantive)
	Lieutenant-Colonel	British Indian Army	1 April 1946 (war-substantive)
	Colonel	British Indian Army	1 April 1946 (acting)
	Brigadier	British Indian Army	13 June 1946 (acting)
	Major	Indian Army	15 August 1947 (Note: Upon independence in 1947, India became a Dominion within the British Commonwealth of Nations. As a result, the rank insignia of the British Army, incorporating the Tudor Crown and four-pointed Bath Star ("pip"), was retained, as George VI remained Commander-in-Chief of the Indian Armed Forces. After 26 January 1950, when India became a republic, the President of India became Commander-in-Chief, and the Ashoka Lion replaced the crown, with a five-pointed star being substituted for the "pip.")
	Major-General	Indian Army	30 August 1949 (acting); 1 January 1950 (substantive, with seniority from 30 August 1949)
	Major-General	Indian Army	26 January 1950 (recommissioning and change in insignia)
	Lieutenant-General	Indian Army	1 June 1955 (local); 1 February 1957 (substantive)

== Bibliography ==
- Thorat, S. P. P. (1985). From Reveille to Retreat. Allied Publishers. ISBN 978-8-17023-077-9.

== Notes ==
Military offices
Preceded by Kalwant Singh	Chief of the General Staff; 1950-1953	Succeeded by Jayanto Nath Chaudhuri
Preceded by K S Thimayya	General Officer Commanding-in-Chief Eastern Command; 1957 - 1961	Succeeded by L P Sen
