= Exercise Lal Qila =

Military exercise conducted on 17 March 1960

Exercise Lal Qila was a military exercise conducted on 17 March 1960, at the headquarters of the Indian Army's Eastern Command in Lucknow. The wargame simulated an attack on India's eastern sector by the Chinese armed forces. While the exercise was conducted to sensitize the leadership, it did not have the desired effect.

Exercise Lal Qila was conducted under Major General SPP Thorat, the commanding officer of the Eastern Command. Thorat's report detailing the defense of the eastern sector, sometimes referred to as the 'Lal Qila report', 'Thorat plan' or 'Thorat doctrine', had similarities with the exercise: it outlined a Chinese attack, and the inability of Indian forces to contain (or even delay) it. Thorat suggested defensive measures that took into account Sikkim, East Pakistan (Now-Bangladesh) and Nepal, as well as the northeastern sector. In October 1962, India and China went to war; Prime Minister Jawaharlal Nehru only saw Thorat's report as the war was ending.

== Background ==
Thorat had gained experience fighting against Chinese forces as a commander during the Korean War. When he became the commander of the Eastern Command in 1957, he assessed the situation in the northeast, studying terrain, intelligence reports, and the location and speed of Chinese military movements. From this, he observed that forces under the eastern command would have multiple roles in the event of a war: they would need to defend Indian territory (as well as that of Sikkim) from both China and East Pakistan, and they would likely need to assist Nepal's military, while maintaining order in the northeastern states. He also recommended that the army receive air support from the air force for engagements near the borders.

Thorat's assessment was also based on changing relations with China; specifically, their claims over Indian-claimed territory, a communiqué regarding the McMahon line, and some incursions in the west, central and eastern sectors. For the army to be able to push back the Chinese, more preparation was needed. Suggestions included shifting the responsibility of NEFA from the Assam Rifles to the Army's Eastern Command, on the grounds that the Army would be ultimately responsible for the defence of the territory anyway. At the time, Assam Rifles was a paramilitary force functioning under the center, and was responsible for NEFA. These suggestions were not taken seriously at the time; on 8 October 1959, Thorat presented a paper on the defense of the northeast to the Chief of the Army Staff, General Thimayya, who forwarded it to Krishna Menon (the Defense Minister at the time). Menon dismissed the paper, and called Thorat a "warmonger". Subsequently, to convey the seriousness of the situation to leadership, Thorat was given permission to conduct Exercise Lal Qila.

== Exercise Lal Qila ==
Lal Quila was held in Lucknow on 17 March 1960. It was attended by the Chief of the Army Staff and all Principal Staff Officers in Army headquarters. The exercises attempted to show that, with the then-existing level of preparation, India would not be able to contain or repel a Chinese attack. Thorat also explained how a Chinese attack would progress day by day. In what came to be known as the "Thorat Doctrine" or "Thorat Plan", he suggested a defensive layout, and additional troops that would be required. One of his suggestions was that, rather than deploying troops at the borders, a stronger line should be held away from the border, at logistically easier locations to reinforce; this would stretch Chinese lines. Thorat also argued that the forward policy of the Defence Minister and Lt Gen BM Kaul was not practical.

== Reactions ==
The exercise did not have the desired effect on military or civilian leadership. Lieutenant General BM Kaul, who attended the exercise, did not agree with Thorat on his assessment. There was no subsequent deployment of additional troops, and Thorat's comments on the forward policy were not acknowledged; the intelligence chief and intelligence bureau had predicted at the time that China would not use force, or react to the forward policy. Further, Thimayya's position at the time was weakened. Both Thorat and Thimayya retired in May 1961.

A few months after Exercise Lal Qila, in October 1960, General Pran Nath Thapar (the commander of the Western Command) carried out 'Exercise Sheel', in which Ladakh (which would be one of the battlefields during the 1962 war) fell under the Western Command. This exercise revealed that an additional division was needed to counter an attack by China; in May 1961, Thapar became the Chief of the Army Staff, and when the same Western Command asked for an extra division in September 1961, Thapar refused.

Historian Kunal Verma, in the book 1962: The War That Wasn't, described Exercise Lal Qila and Thorat's attempts to convey the seriousness of the China situation to leadership. Reactions to Lal Qila were also mentioned in Thimayya's biography Thimayya, An Amazing Life and Thorat's autobiography From Reveille to Retreat, in which Thorat also wrote about related events in 1962. Prime Minister Jawaharlal Nehru was only made aware of Thorat's report during the later stages of the war; Thorat was sent to Delhi, as Nehru wanted to consult with him, and told Nehru that the Chinese would go back by themselves.
