= Mark C. Udey =

American biologist

Mark C. Udey is an American biologist, focusing in epidermal Langerhans cells, dendritic cells, EpCAM (epithelial cell adhesion molecule), distal-less and skin immunology, currently at National Cancer Institute and an Elected Fellow of the American Association for the Advancement of Science. Udey is a professor of dermatology at Washington University School of Medicine, where he was also a graduate of the medical scientist training program.
