= Forward policy (Sino-Indian conflict) =

Military strategy employed in the Sino-Indian border conflict

Forward policy was a term coined by the Indian Army to refer to the Indian government directive of establishing "forward" posts (advance posts) to reclaim disputed territory occupied by China. The Dhola Post in particular became a trigger leading up to the 1962 Sino-Indian War. The term has also been used to describe China's and Britain's Tibet policies in the early 1900s.

== Colonial era forward policies ==
Wendy Palace, a member of the Tibet Society at the University of Cambridge, described the 1903 British expedition to Tibet, which was spearheaded by the government of India under the British Raj, as one of the most extreme examples of forward policy on India's frontiers. While London viewed Tibet under the wider context of its relations with China and Russia and was thus reluctant to provoke the two powers unnecessarily, Lord Curzon of the British Indian government was more eager to protect its commercial interests, such as trade routes crossing the Himalayas. China reacted with its own forward policy to reinforce control but was often held back by internal and external turmoils. Kapileshwar Labh believes that due to China's then push into British India and the Himalayan states of Nepal, Sikkim, and Bhutan, India's reactionary and defensive forward policy during the later half of the century was conceptualized.

== Sino-Indian War ==
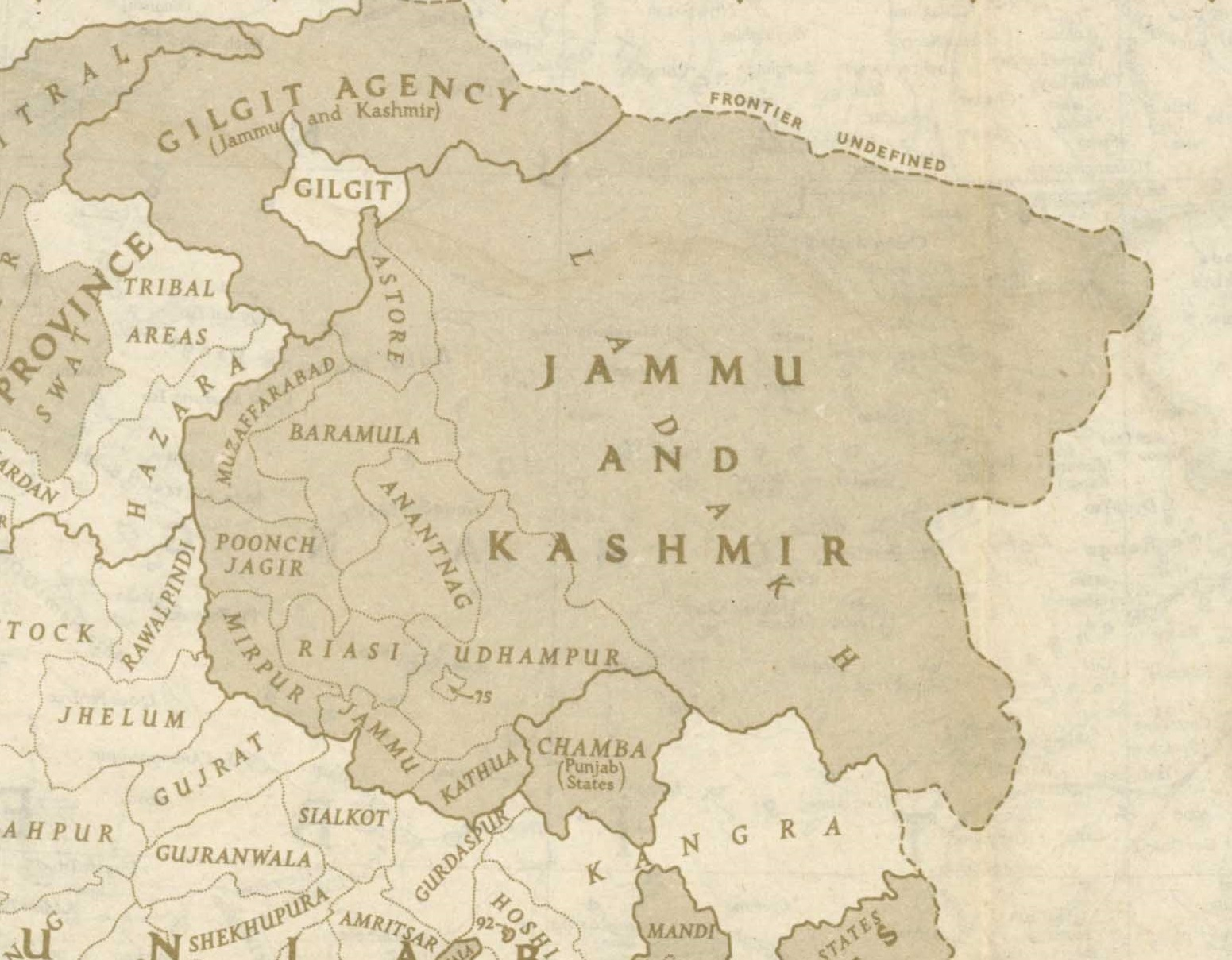
Jammu and Kashmir (National Geographic, 1946)

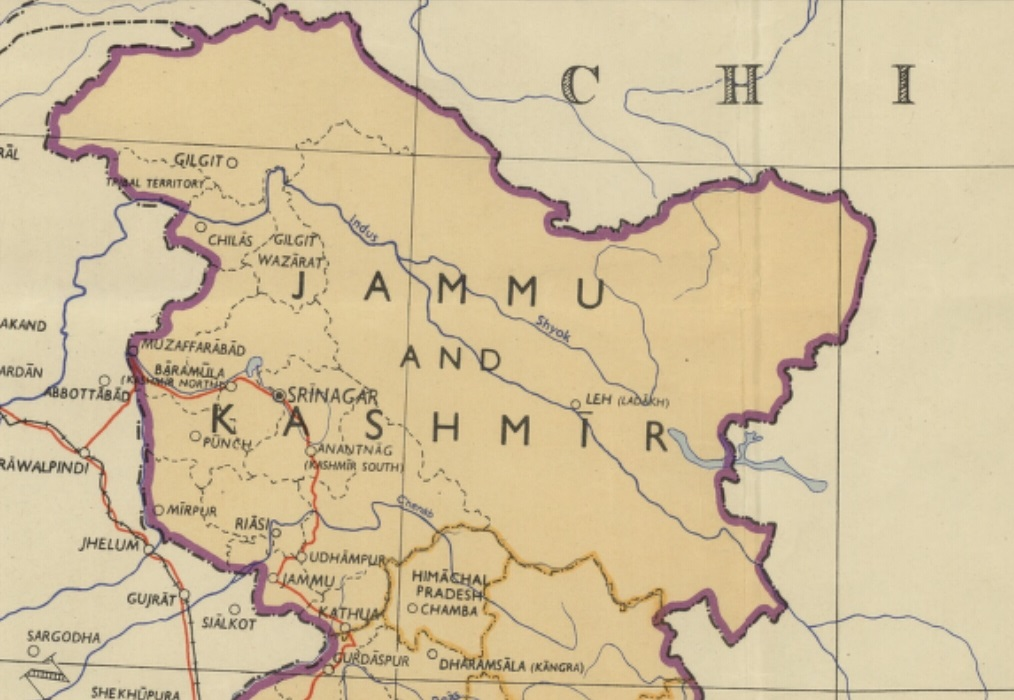
Jammu and Kashmir (Survey of India, 1954)

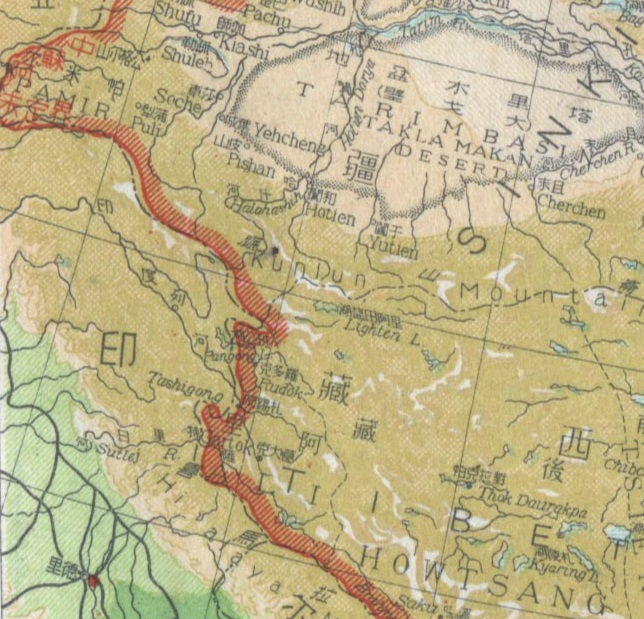
The Jammu and Kashmir border of the Republic of China, 1947

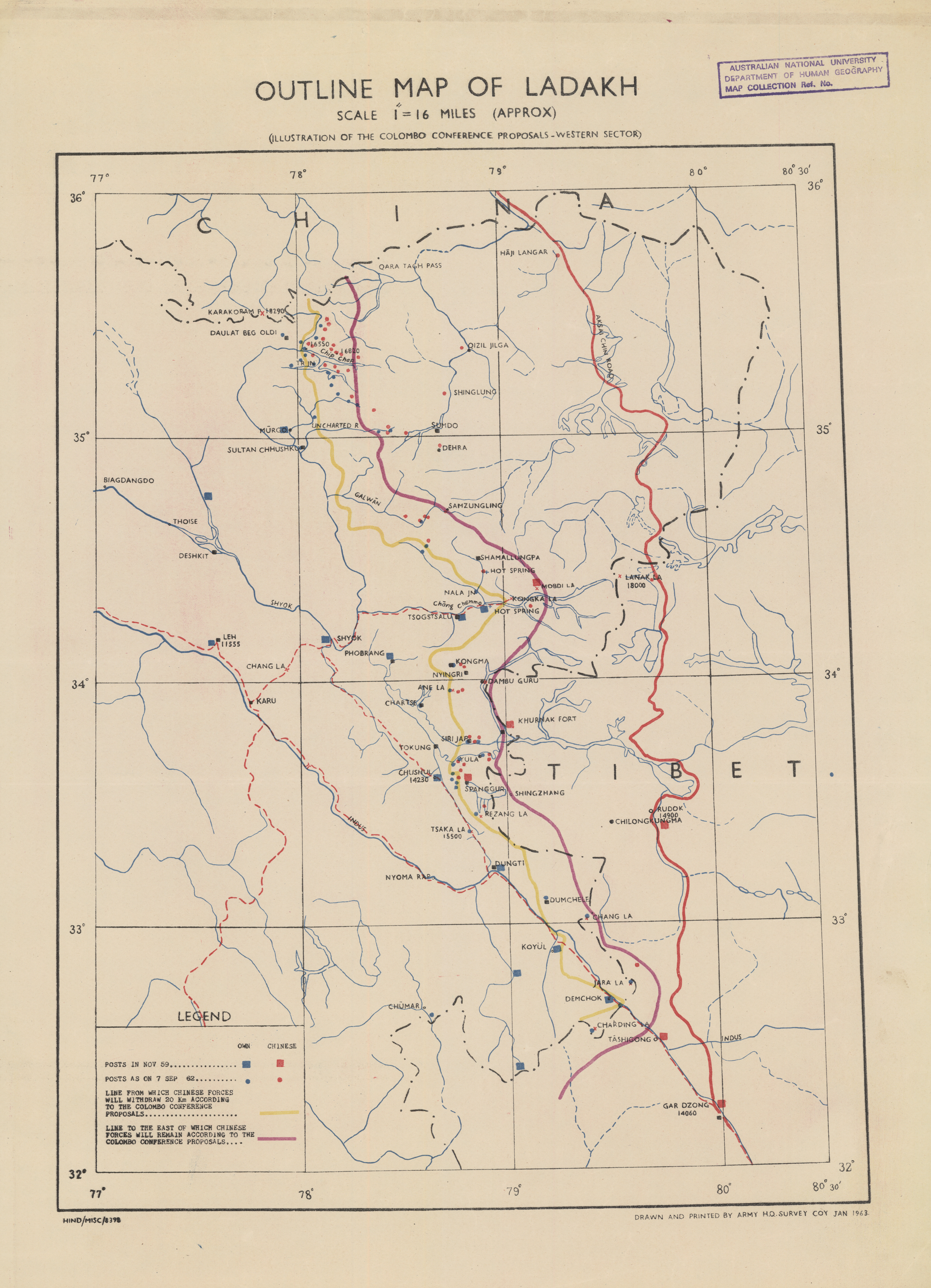
The 'forward policy': Indian posts in blue, Chinese posts in red

Forward policy with respect to India refers to political and military decisions taken in the early 1950s onwards, but it usually specifically refers to the policy adopted in late 1961 in the context of Jawaharlal Nehru, the Sino India border relations and the 1962 war. The forward policy adopted on 2 November 1961 and has been used to explain and justify the Sino-Indian War, which was launched by China in October 1962. While the Henderson Brooks–Bhagat Report opined that the 1962 war was triggered by India's forward policy, other views occur such as that of Bertil Lintner, who blames events in 1959, specifically the escape of the Dalai Lama from Lhasa, Tibet, to India. Until 1971, Intelligence Bureau Director Mullik positively had advocated the forward policy decision made by Nehru. The Intelligence Bureau had a forward policy in place in 1959. The term "forward policy" was also used in government documents but was a misnomer or seen in the incorrect context of Indian expansionism. The policy did not imply expansionism but was a defensive policy based on perceived external aggression by pushing back an external aggressor from one's own territory.

Nehru's forward policy was an attempt to break the deadlock that Chinese-Indian relations had reached in 1961. A deadlocked created by events in Tibet caused border clashes, which resulted in fatalities, India's perceived helplessness against Chinese border developments was exacerbated by international and mounting domestic pressure. On 5 December 1961 orders went to the Eastern and Western commands:

[...] We are to patrol as far forward as possible from our present positions towards the International Border as recognized by us. This will be done with a view to establishing additional posts located to prevent the Chinese from advancing further and also to dominate any Chinese posts already established in our territory. [...]

The forward policy had India identify a set of strategies designed with the ultimate goal of effectively forcing the Chinese from territory that the Indian government claimed. The doctrine was based on a theory that China would not likely launch an all-out war if India began to occupy territory that China considered to be its own. India's thinking was partly based on the fact that China had many external problems in early 1962, especially with one of the Taiwan Strait Crises. Also, Chinese leaders had insisted they did not wish a war.

In June 1962, local Indian commanders had established Dhola Post, in Tawang. The issue was that Dhola Post was one mile north of the McMahon line as interpreted by China.

General Niranjan Prasad, the commander of the Fourth Division, later wrote, "We at the front knew that since Nehru had said he was going to attack, the Chinese were certainly not going to wait to be attacked".

Nehru's forward policy did not achieve what he had wanted. Contrary to his predictions, China attacked Indian outposts north of the McMahon Line. Thus began the Sino-Indian War, which lasted 30 days as China eventually pushed Indian forces back miles south of the McMahon line. China unilaterally declared a ceasefire with a message that India has entered Chinese territory.

With respect to China, Indian diplomat T. N. Kaul later wrote that the only valid, logical and reasonable surmise seems to be that:

China's radical leaders... wanted China to become the leader of the communist world and the "Big Brother" in Asia, with a string of client states around it.... India seemed to be the main obstacle in extending China's hegemony over Asia and then assume the leadership of the Third World.... This was China's "forward policy" against India. She wanted to show the Third World that India was military weak, socially decadent and economically dependent on Western aid.

C. Raja Mohan used the phrase "forward policy" in 2003 with respect to India in Afghanistan. The term has also been used in relation to the 2020 China–India skirmishes.

== Sources ==
- Garver, John W. (2006). "4: China's Decision for War with India in 1962". In Johnston, Alastair Iain; Ross, Robert S. (eds.). New Direction in the Study of China's Foreign Policy (PDF). Stanford, California: Stanford University Press. pp. 86–130.
