= Udey Chand Dubey =

Indian general

Major-General Udey Chand Dubey
- Born: 26 March 1909; Sujanpur, Gurdaspur district, Punjab Province, British Raj (now Punjab, India)
- Died: 21 April 2009 (aged 100); Delhi, India
- Military career
- Allegiance: British India; India
- Branch: British Indian Army; Indian Army
- Service years: 1930–1960
- Rank: Major General
- Service number: IA-562
- Units: 1st Punjab Regiment; Dogra Regiment
- Commands: GOC, UP Area; GOC, Delhi Area; GOC, 25th Infantry Division; GOC, Bombay Area; 5th Infantry Brigade; GOC, Rajasthan Area; 2nd Dogra Regiment
- Conflicts: World War II; Indo-Pakistani War of 1947

Major-General Udey Chand Dubey (26 March 1909 – 21 April 2009) was an Indian Army general and centenarian.

== Early career ==
Among the first cadets selected to attend the Prince of Wales Royal Indian Military College (now the Rashtriya Indian Military College) in 1922, Dubey was one of three graduates selected for a King's Commission as a King's Commissioned Indian Officer (KCIO) in 1928. He passed out from the Royal Military Academy Sandhurst on 30 January 1930. As was customary, he was posted to a British Army regiment, the Norfolk Regiment, for a period of one year. On 30 March 1931, he was posted to the 2nd Battalion of the 1st Punjab Regiment. Other KCIOs in the battalion at the same time were Kalwant Singh, later a lieutenant general, and the battalion adjutant Pran Nath Thapar, the future Chief of the Army Staff.

Dubey was promoted lieutenant on 30 April 1932, and was appointed battalion quartermaster on 1 June 1936. He was promoted captain on 1 August 1938, and in April 1939 qualified as a second-class interpreter in Urdu. On 26 March 1940, he was appointed battalion adjutant. In 1941, now an acting major, Dubey was selected to attend the 4th War Course at the Staff College, Quetta, which ran from 21 July to 13 December 1941; among his fellow students was Squadron Leader Subroto Mukerjee.

== Post-war and post-Independence ==
Dubey was promoted substantive major (temporary lieutenant-colonel) on 30 January 1947. As the 1st Punjab was assigned to the new Pakistan Army following Independence and partition, Dubey was transferred to the Dogra Regiment. During the Indo-Pakistani War of 1947–1948, he commanded the regiment's second battalion in the Kashmir Valley, notably at the battle of Uri for which the unit received battle and theatre honours. On 17 December 1949, he was appointed GOC, Rajasthan Union States Forces, with the local rank of major-general. He was promoted substantive colonel on 1 January 1950 and to substantive brigadier on 30 January 1951. Relinquishing his local rank of major-general on 19 May 1951, he was given command of the 5th Infantry Brigade on 1 September.

On 7 October 1952, Dubey was appointed officiating GOC, Bombay Area, with the acting rank of major-general, and was assigned to command the 25th Infantry Division on 31 October 1953. He was promoted substantive major-general on 30 January 1955, and was appointed GOC Delhi Area on 25 July. As GOC Delhi Area, Dubey was principal organiser of the annual Army Day and Republic Day Parades, also staging the Western Command's torchlight tattoo in 1958. On 15 March 1959, he took charge in his final appointment as GOC, U.P. Area, serving in this capacity until his retirement from the Army on 1 June 1960.

Dubey settled in Delhi, where he died on 21 April 2009, nearly a month after his 100th birthday.

== Dates of rank ==
Insignia	Rank	Component	Date of rank
	Second Lieutenant	British Indian Army	30 January 1930
	Lieutenant	British Indian Army	30 April 1932
	Captain	British Indian Army	1 August 1938
	Major	British Indian Army	1941 (acting); 16 August 1942 (temporary); 30 January 1947 (substantive)
	Lieutenant-Colonel	British Indian Army	30 January 1947 (temporary)
	Major	Indian Army	15 August 1947 (Note: Upon independence in 1947, India became a Dominion within the British Commonwealth of Nations. As a result, the rank insignia of the British Army, incorporating the Tudor Crown and four-pointed Bath Star ("pip"), was retained, as George VI remained Commander-in-Chief of the Indian Armed Forces. After 26 January 1950, when India became a republic, the President of India became Commander-in-Chief, and the Ashoka Lion replaced the crown, with a five-pointed star being substituted for the "pip.")
	Brigadier	Indian Army	30 January 1948 (acting)
	Major General	Indian Army	17 December 1949 (local)
	Colonel	Indian Army	1 January 1950 (seniority from 30 January 1948)
	Colonel	Indian Army	26 January 1950 (recommissioning and change in insignia)
	Brigadier	Indian Army	30 January 1951 (substantive)
	Major General	Indian Army	7 October 1952 (acting); 30 January 1955 (substantive)
