= Lal Quila Express =

Train in India

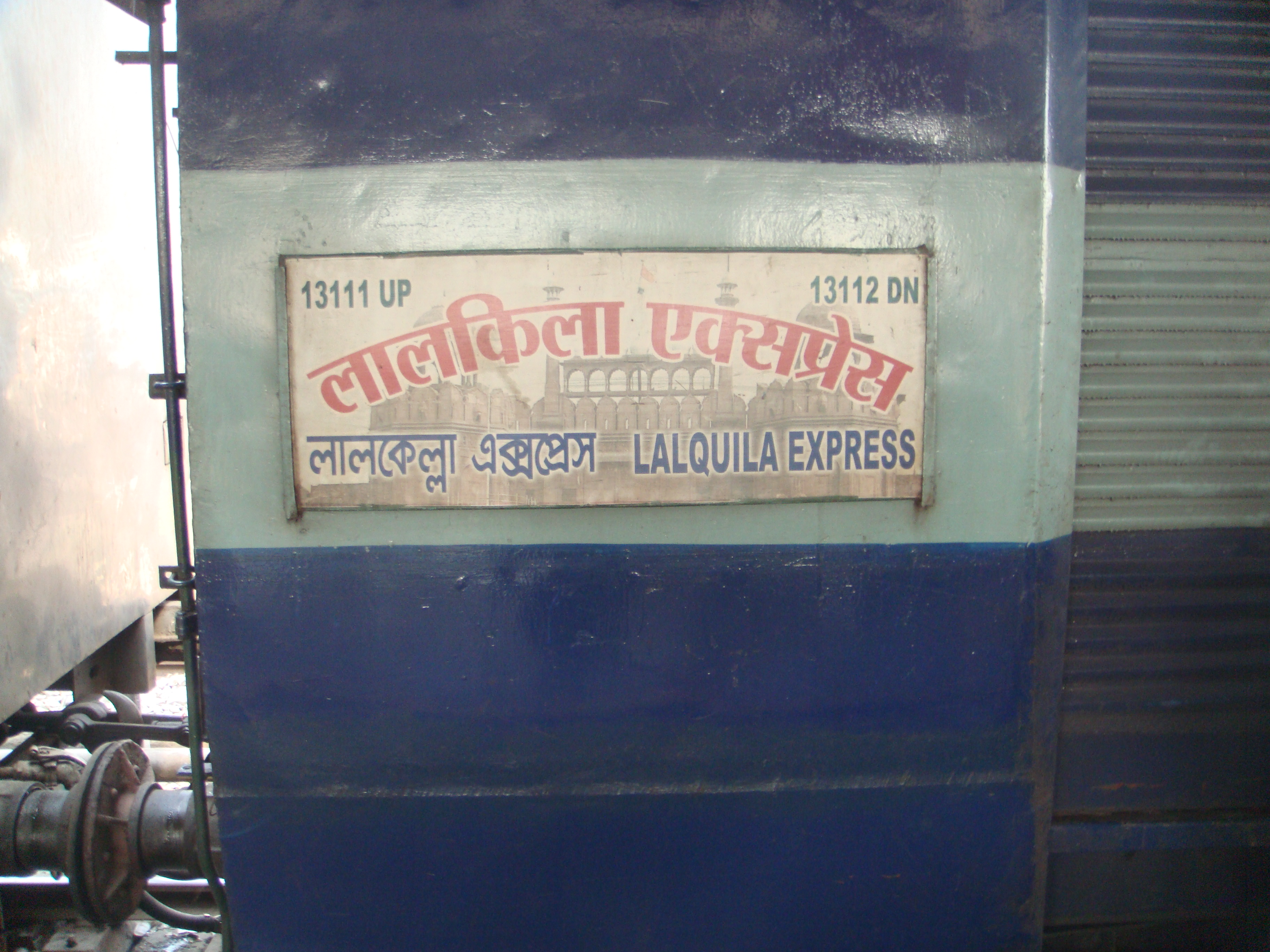
- Lal Quila Express train board.

Overview
- Service type: Express
- Locale: West Bengal, Jharkhand, Bihar, Uttar Pradesh & Delhi
- First service: 15 October 1860; 165 years ago
- Last service: Permanently cancelled from 30 June 2014; 11 years ago
- Current operator: Eastern Railway

Route
- Termini: Kolkata (KOAA); Delhi Junction (DLI)
- Stops: 68
- Distance travelled: 1,532 km (952 mi)
- Average journey time: 30 hours 55 minutes
- Service frequency: Daily
- Train number: 13111 / 13112

On-board services
- Classes: AC 3 Tier, Sleeper Class, General Unreserved
- Seating arrangements: Yes
- Sleeping arrangements: Yes
- Catering facilities: On-board catering
- Observation facilities: Large windows
- Baggage facilities: No
- Other facilities: Below the seats

Technical
- Rolling stock: ICF coach
- Track gauge: 1,676 mm (5 ft 6 in)
- Operating speed: 110 km/h (68 mph) maximum, 50 km/h (31 mph) average including halts
Route map
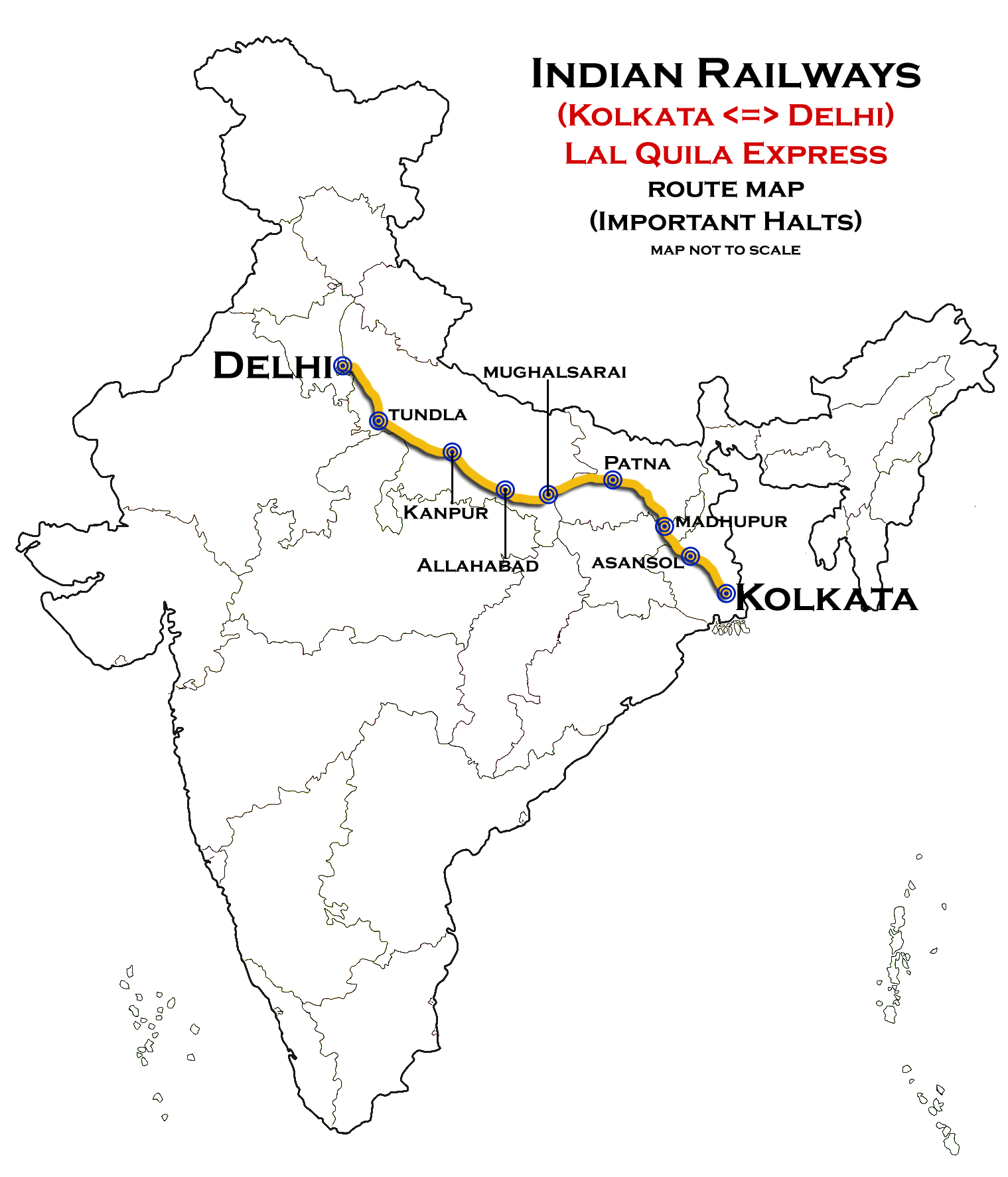

The 13111 / 13112 Lal Quila Express was an express train belonging to Indian Railways that runs between Kolkata and Delhi Junction in India. It was pre-independence train which ran between two important cities i.e. Delhi and Kolkata. It operates as train number 13111 from Kolkata to Delhi Junction and as train number 13112 in the reverse direction. It is named after the Red Fort which is located in Delhi. The word Lal Quila means Red Fort in Devanagari. Its last service was 30 June 2014.

== Coaches ==
The 13111/13112 Lal Quila Express presently has two AC 3 tier, four Sleeper class and five General Unreserved coaches. Slip coaches of Kolkata–Giridih Express are attached and detached at Madhupur Junction. As with most train services in India, coach composition may be amended at the discretion of Indian Railways depending on demand.

== Service ==
The 13111 Lal Quila Express covers the distance of 1526 kilometres in 30 hours 55 mins (49.36 km/h) & 1552 kilometres in 34 hours 40 mins (44.77 km/h) as 13112 Lal Quila Express. As the average speed of the train is below 55 km/h, its fare does not include a Superfast surcharge.

== Traction ==
As the entire route between Kolkata & Delhi Junction is electrified, it is hauled by a WAP-4 electric locomotive from the Howrah Loco Shed.

== Timetable ==
13111 Lal Quila Express leaves Kolkata every day at 20:15 hrs IST and reaches Delhi Junction at 03:10 hrs IST on the 3rd day. 13112 Lal Quila Express leaves elhi Junction every day at 20:50 hrs IST and reaches Kolkata at 07:30 hrs IST on the 3rd day.

Station code	Station name	13111 – Kolkata to Delhi Junction		Distance from source in km	Day	13112 – Delhi Junction to Kolkata		Distance from source in km	Day
Station code	Station name	Arrival	Departure	Distance from source in km	Day	Arrival	Departure	Distance from source in km	Day
KOAA	Kolkata	Source	20:15	0	1	07:30	Destination	1552	3
BWN	Barddhaman Junction	21:58	22:03	98	1	04:45	04:50	1430	3
ASN	Asansol Junction	23:27	23:32	203	1	03:05	03:15	1324	3
MDP	Madhupur Junction	01:00	01:40	284	2	01:00	01:40	1243	3
Jsme	Jasidih Junction	02:10	02:15	534	2	00:25	00:35	993	2
MGS	Mughalsarai Junction	12:07	12 :27	746	2	14:00	14:15	781	2
ALD	Allahabad Junction	15:20	15:30	899	2	10:45	10:58	628	2
CNB	Kanpur Central	18:55	19:05	1093	2	06:40	06:50	434	2
TDL	Tundla Junction	22:45	22:55	1323	2	01:35	01:45	204	2
DLI	Delhi Junction	03:10	Destination	1526	3	Source	20:50	0	1

== Gallery ==
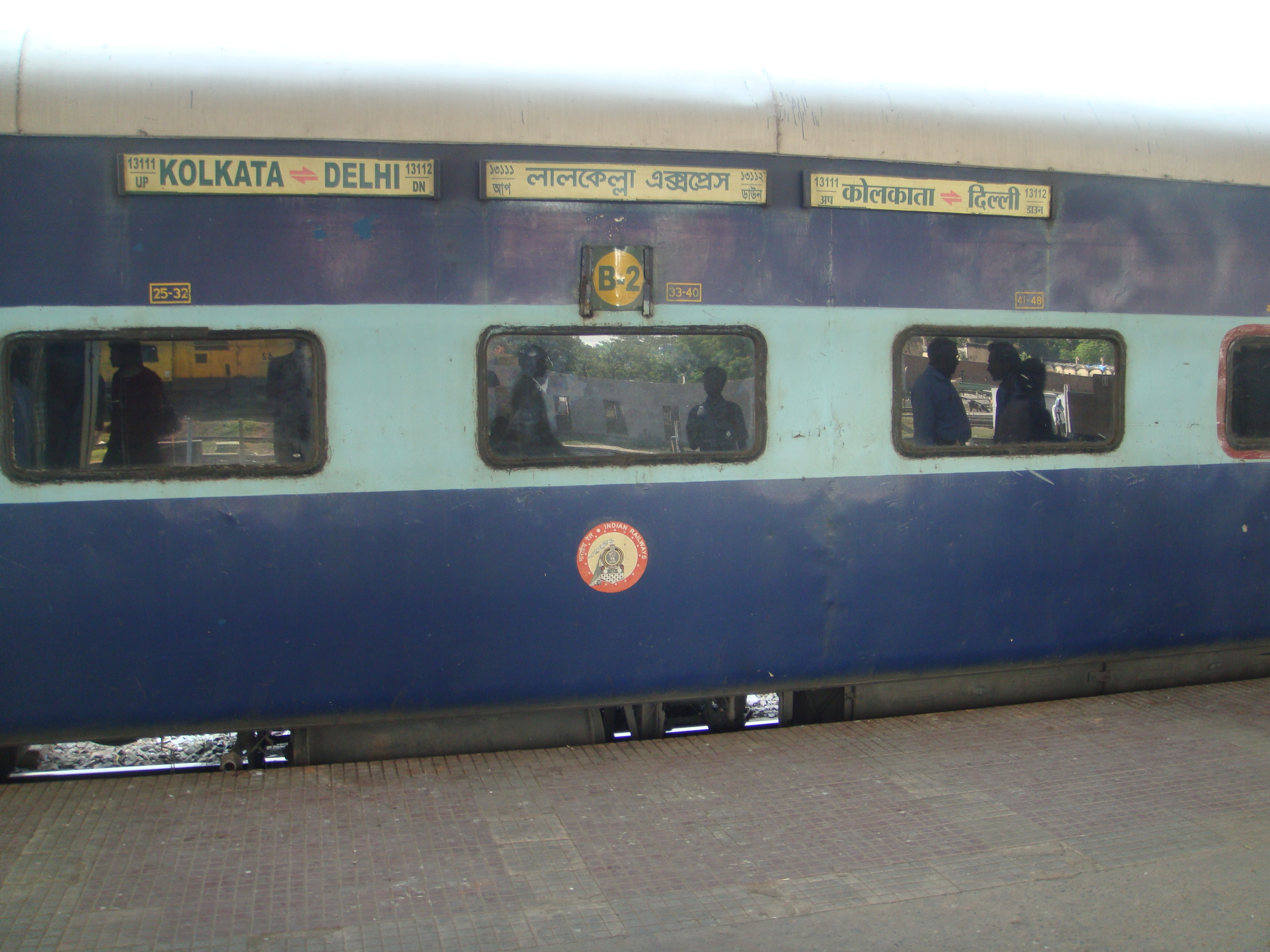
13111 Lal Quila Express – AC 3 tier

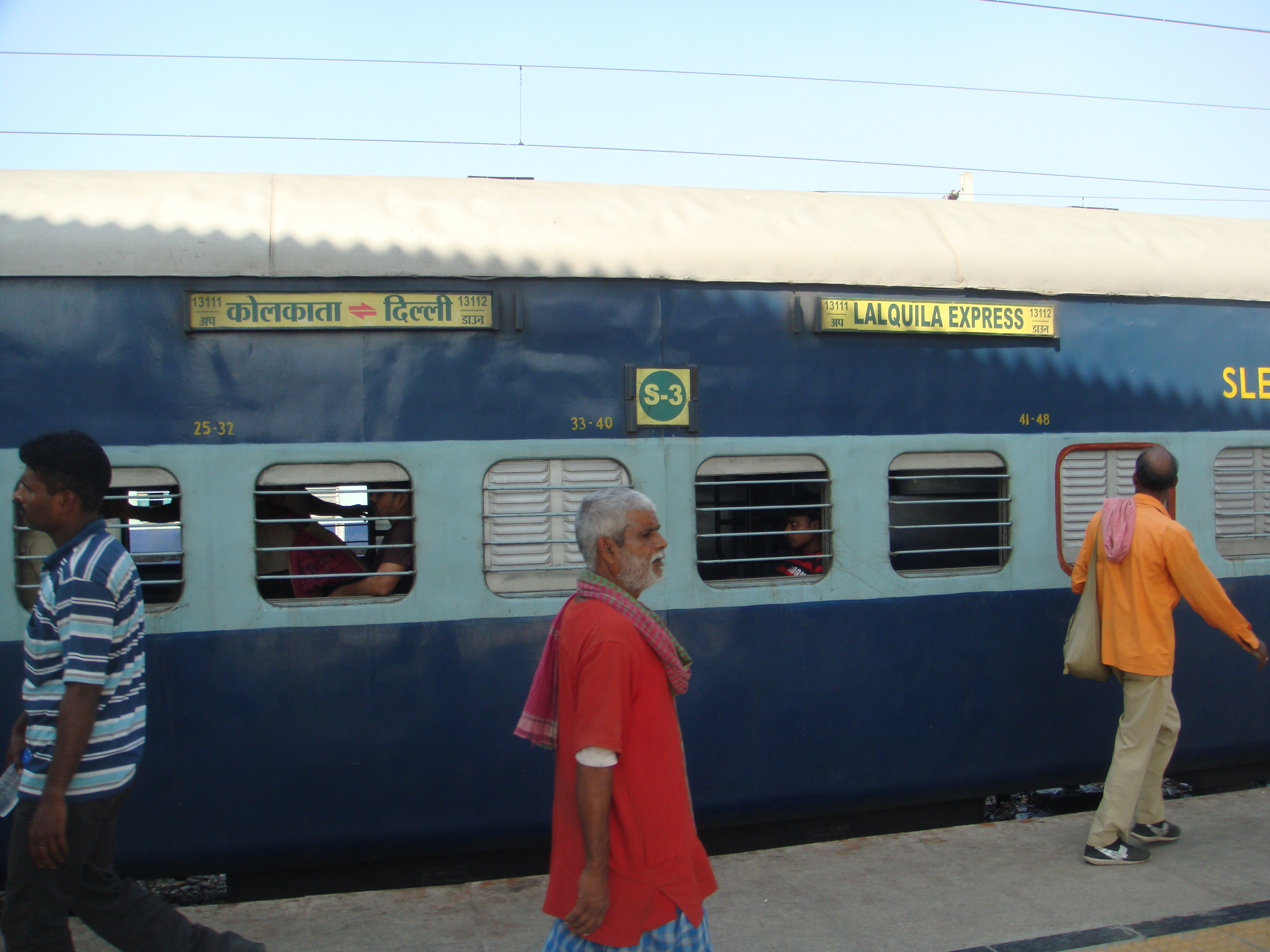
13111 Lal Quila Express – Sleeper class
