= Lal Qila, Lower Dir =

Town in Khyber Pakhtunkhwa, Pakistan

Coordinates: 34°57′10″N 71°48′30″E

Lal Qila (Pashto/Urdu: لعل قلعه) is a town and a union council of Lower Dir District in Khyber Pakhtunkhwa, Pakistan. It is located in the Maidan valley. According to the 2023 Census of Pakistan, the tehsil has a total population of 247,381 and a literacy rate of 53.29%. It is represented in the National Assembly through the NA-7 constituency.

== Union councils ==
- Bishgram
- Lal Qila
- Gall Maidan
- Kotkai
- Zaimdara

== See also ==
- Lower Dir District
