= Neutral Nations Repatriation Commission =

Korean War commission

After the Korean War, prisoner exchange was important for both sides. The UN wanted voluntary repatriation, while the People's Republic of China wanted forced repatriation. By May 1952, despite several efforts, the issue was deadlocked. Several plans were put forth and the UN eventually agreed to follow then-Indian Prime Minister Jawaharlal Nehru's and Defense Minister V. K. Krishna Menon's prisoner-of-war settlement proposal which called for a Neutral Nations' Repatriation Commission (NNRC). The proposal was rejected by the People's Republic of China and the Democratic People's Republic of Korea on 3 December 1952. UN Commander General Mark W. Clark then proposed an exchange of sick and wounded soldiers, which was agreed to by the Communists. Thus, Operation Little Switch got underway. This was the first exchange of soldiers which began that year on 20 April.

== Proposal and Formation ==
With approval from the United Nations General Assembly a neutral-nations repatriation commission to return all POWs was constituted. This was because the UN found out that some of the Korean and Chinese prisoners refused to return to Communist control. But several proposals and counter proposals dragged on until all agreed to have a neutral nations' repatriation commission. A new Communist plan called for giving custody over the POWs to a five-nation neutral repatriation commission consisting of India, Poland, Switzerland, Czechoslovakia and Sweden. But the UN rejected this initial proposal because the repatriates were refused eventual civilian status and freedom and they were to be relocated to a neutral nation. Instead of a cumbersome five-nations custody, the commission's decisions were to be supervised by Indian forces and an Indian chairman. All non-repatriates were to be given civilian status within sixty days. But North Korea rejected this proposal.

UN General Clark received new instructions. Accordingly, all POWs were to be handed over to the commission and allowed a 90- or 120-day period during which the non-repatriates were to be convinced to return home. After that the remaining men would either be given civilian status or their futures would be decided by the UN General Assembly. Also the commission were to decide all disputes by voting and to favor a simple majority. It was decided that the commission would provide for 120 days of custody. After that the POWs who refused repatriation would be granted civilian status.

== NNRC ==
On 27 July 1953, two neutral nation commissions were formed to implement and supervise the cease-fire, the other being the Neutral Nations Supervisory Commission (NNSC), as part of the truce. The UN had selected Sweden and Switzerland which were neutral and were initial members which had signed the UN Charter. But the Chinese Communist Forces (CCF, the Cold War term for The People's Republic of China) chose the People's Republics of Poland and of Czechoslovakia which were Communist countries and members of the UN charter as well. The People's Republic of China also wanted USSR involved but the UN rejected the proposal. The NNRC also arrived in Korea on 27 July 1953. It was under the chairmanship of the Indian Army Major General K S Thimayya. Along with the above four countries, which were made members of the NNSC, India chaired the NNRC and supported the POWs. POWs refusing to return to their homeland were placed under the NNRC for 120 days. Subsequently, the second and larger exchange of POWs took place. This was called Operation Big Switch. Most of the POWs had been repatriated by September 1953. In February 1954, the NNRC was dissolved, but CCF released a few of the UN POWs only by August 1955.
