= Kodandera Subayya Thimayya =

Indian Chief of Army staff

General Kodandera Subayya Thimayya DSO
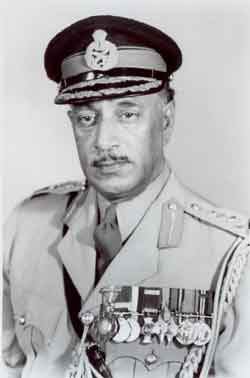
- General KS Thimayya

3rd Chief of the Army Staff
- In office 8 May 1957 – 7 May 1961
- President: Rajendra Prasad
- Prime Minister: Jawaharlal Nehru
- Preceded by: Satyawant Shrinagesh
- Succeeded by: Pran Nath Thapar

Personal details
- Born: 31 March 1906 Madikeri, Coorg Province, British India (now Kodagu district, Karnataka, India)
- Died: 18 December 1965 (aged 59) Cyprus
- Military career
- Education: Prince of Wales Royal Indian Military College; Royal Military College, Sandhurst
- Allegiance: British India; India
- Branch: British Indian Army; Indian Army
- Service years: 1926 – 1961
- Rank: General
- Service number: AI-944
- Unit: 19th Hyderabad Regiment (Now Kumaon Regiment)
- Commands: Eastern Army; Southern Army; Western Army; 19th Infantry Division; 268th Indian Infantry Brigade; 8/19 Hyderabad; United Nations Peacekeeping Force in Cyprus (UNFICYP)
- Awards: Padma Bhushan; Distinguished Service Order; Mentioned in dispatches

General Kodandera Subayya Thimayya DSO (31 March 1906 – 18 December 1965) was the 3rd Chief of Army Staff of the Indian Army from 1957 to 1961 during the crucial years leading up to the conflict with China in 1962. Thimayya was the only Indian to command an Infantry brigade in battle during the Second World War and is regarded as the most distinguished combat officer the Indian Army has produced. After the Korean War, Thimayya headed a United Nations unit dealing with the repatriation of prisoners of war. After his retirement from the Army, he was appointed Commander of the United Nations Peace Keeping Force in Cyprus from July 1964 to December 1965 and died in Cyprus while on active duty on 18 December 1965 due to heart attack.

== Early life and education ==
Kodandera Subayya Thimayya was born in Madikeri, the district town of Kodagu (formerly known as Coorg), Karnataka, on 31 March 1906, to Subayya and Sitamma into a Kodava family. His family was one of the leading coffee planters in the area. His mother, Sitamma, was highly educated and a social worker. She was the recipient of Kaisar-e-Hind Medal, in recognition of her work in public service. Thimayya was the second of six children in his family. The eldest was Ponappa (m) (known as Ponnu), then Thimayya (known in the family as Dubbu, and by the British as Timmy), followed by Gangu (f), Dachu (f), Amavva (f) (known as Amie) and finally Somayya (m) (known as Freddie). All the three boys of the family rose to become officers in the Indian Army.

On his father's side, Thimayya belonged to the Kodendera clan to which India's first commander-in-chief Cariappa also belonged (his uncle in fact). His mother, Cheppudi Chittauwa (or Cheppusi Chittavva), was from the Cheppudira family. His wife, Nina Thimayya, was a recipient of the Kaisar-e-Hind Medal for her philanthropic contribution during the 1935 Quetta earthquake. His maternal uncle, C.B. Ponnappa, was in the first batch of commissioned Indian officers from the Indore defence school and a batchmate of Cariappa. Desiring that he receive a good education, his family sent Thimayya, at the age of eight years, to St. Joseph's College in Coonoor, a convent run by Irish brothers. Later, Thimayya was sent to Bishop Cotton Boys' School in Bangalore, along with his brothers. After completing school, Thimayya was sent to the Prince of Wales Royal Indian Military College for military training and a stepping stone for a commission in the Indian Army. His elder brother Ponnappa (later joined INA) as well as younger brother Somayya (died in a mine accident in 1947–48 Kashmir operations) also joined the Indian army. Following his graduation from RIMC, "Timmy", as he was affectionately known, was one of only six Indian cadets selected for further training at the Royal Military College, Sandhurst.

== Early career ==
After completing his training, he was commissioned into the Indian Army on 4 February 1926 as a Second Lieutenant. Amongst the other newly commissioned officers in his batch was Pran Nath Thapar, who would one day succeed Thimayya as Chief of Army Staff. Thimayya was subsequently attached to the Highland Light Infantry as was the norm then, prior to a permanent posting with a regiment of the British Indian Army. He was soon posted to the 4th Battalion of the 19th Hyderabad Regiment (now Kumaon Regiment), with date from 28 May 1927. Appointed the regimental adjutant in September 1930, Thimayya honed his soldiering skills on that famous training ground in the Northwest Frontier (present-day Pakistan), battling recalcitrant Pathan tribals.

In January 1935, Thimayya married Nina Cariappa (no relation to K M Cariappa). On 20 March 1936, they had a daughter, Mireille. The same April, Thimayya was posted as an Adjutant at the University Training Corps in Madras.

=== Second World War ===
After this tenure, Thimayya was posted to his battalion in Singapore. In early 1941, he was promoted to the acting rank of Major, and at his request, was transferred to India in October. Thimayya was posted as the Second-in-Command of a new raising (8/19 Hyderabad, later 8 Kumaon and 4 Kumaon) at the Hyderabad Regimental Centre in Agra. He was then detailed to attend the Staff College at Quetta where he and his wife had earlier made a name for themselves by selfless service during the 1935 Quetta earthquake. He then served as GSO2 (Ops) (a Grade II Staff Officer) of 25th Indian Division, the first Indian officer to get this coveted staff appointment.

His infantry division was conducting jungle warfare training and was preparing to go into Burma to face the Japanese Army during the Second World War, serving in the Second Arakan campaign. In Burma, he was posted to his old regiment as Commanding Officer of 8/19th Hyderabad, which he led with outstanding success in battle of Kangaw. For a short while the battalion was under the command of the 3rd Commando Brigade, with Brigadier C. R. Hardy at the helm, who during the height of a battle presented a trophy to the battalion. It was a green beret — the commandos' head dress — with a little typed message on a card, "We cannot buy anything here but we would like you to accept this as a token of our great admiration for the bravery and achievement of your battalion." For his outstanding service in battle, he was awarded the much coveted Distinguished Service Order (DSO) and also a Mention-in-Dispatches.

Thimayya represented the country during the surrender of the Japanese in Singapore, followed by the surrender of the Japanese in the Philippines. At the ceremony of Japanese surrender in Singapore, he signed on behalf of India. He was awarded the 'Keys to Manila' when he was sent to the Philippines. His innate talents of professional soldiering and leadership were soon recognized by Field Marshal Sir Claude Auchinleck, the Commander-in-Chief of the Indian Army. He was specially selected to lead the 268th Indian Infantry Brigade as part of the British Commonwealth Occupation Force in Japan after World War II. He got this assignment due to his outstanding battle experience as a Brigadier and being the only Indian to command a battle formation in the field. As a matter of policy, the British avoided giving operational command to Indians. Thimmayya was the only exception.

As an independent brigade, the 268th had done excellent work in the Burma Campaign and was detailed as part of BRINDIV led by Maj Gen D. T. "Punch" Cowan. Brig. Thimayya proved to be an outstanding commander and his diplomatic skills emerged as he had to deal with General Douglas MacArthur, the Supreme Allied Commander of the Southwest Pacific Theatre, the other Allies and the vanquished Japanese. Thimayya's personality, charm of manners and unassailable reputation, impressed the Japanese of the calibre of Indian commanders. Thimayya was called on to defuse the sit-down strike by the 2nd Battalion, 5th Royal Gurkha Rifles at the palace of the Emperor of Japan in Tokyo when the battalion refused to obey its British officers.

As Indian Independence approached, he was recalled to India by then Commander-in-chief of British India, Field Marshal Sir Claude Auchinleck.

== Role in independent India ==
He returned to India in 1947, during the Partition, as member of the committee to agree to the allotment of weapons, equipment and regiments that were to remain in India, or to be allotted to Pakistan. Soon after the commission was completed, he was promoted to the acting rank of Major-General in September 1947 and was then assigned the command of the 4th Infantry Division and also to take over the Punjab Boundary Force, dealing with the exodus and intake of refugees fleeing to their respective countries. In 1948 he was one of the active officers in the actions against the forces of Pakistan in the conflict over Kashmir. His next appointment was command of the 19th Infantry Division in Jammu & Kashmir where he succeeded in driving the raiders and the Pakistan Army out of the Kashmir Valley. Personally leading the attack in the forward-most tank, the surprise attack on Zoji La on 1 November 1948 by a brigade with Stuart Light Tanks of the 7th Light Cavalry, succeeded in driving out the entrenched raiders and Pakistan Army regulars and the eventual capture of Dras, Kargil and Leh. For his service, he was mentioned in dispatches.

Thereafter, Thimayya served as the Commandant of the Indian Military Academy, Dehra Dun. On 1 January 1950, he was promoted to substantive major-general from his rank of brigadier. On 1 October 1951, Thimayya was appointed Quartermaster General. The experience gained by him in Japan stood him in good stead when he was specially selected by the United Nations to head the Neutral Nations Repatriation Commission in Korea. It was a very sensitive and delicate task dealing with unruly Chinese and Korean prisoners. Here again, through sheer charisma, impartiality, firmness and diplomacy, he completed this task to the satisfaction of the world body. He returned to India and was promoted to General Officer Commanding-in-Chief, Southern Command, with the rank of Lieutenant-General, in January 1953. In 1954, he was awarded the Padma Bhushan for Civil Service. He took over the reins of the Indian Army on 7 May 1957.

== Chief of Army Staff ==
=== Tenure ===
General Kodandera Subayya Thimayya assumed charge of the Indian Army, as the 3rd Chief of the Army Staff, on 7 May 1957. He briefly resigned his post in 1959 however he later withdrew resignation and continued serving until his retirement on 7 May 1961, almost 15 months before the Chinese invasion of India in November 1962, by then he had completed 35 years of distinguished military service.

Thimayya on Menon

[Menon] was perhaps trying deliberately to make himself the master of the armed forces so that he might one day have their support in the achievement of his political ambition to take Mr. Nehru’s place either after, or even before, Mr. Nehru’s withdrawal from public life

— Thimayya, with British high commissioner MacDonald, October 6, 1959

=== Disputes with Menon ===
The widely attributed explanation to resignation was a dispute with V. K. Krishna Menon, the then Minister of Defence (India), over promotion of Lt. Gen. B. N. Kaul whom Thimayya saw as 'favorite' of Nehru and Menon, in which Thimayya met Nehru with disagreement on Menon's policies to which Menon accused Thimayya of disloyalty in response Thimayya called him having 'Bonapartist ambitions' as he believed that such promotions would undermine army's professional ethos.

On 31 August 1959, he sent a resignation letter to Nehru that read: "“A few days ago, I mentioned to you how impossible it was for me and the other two Chiefs of Staff to carry out our responsibilities under the present Defence Minister… under these circumstances you will understand how impossible it is for me to carry out my duties as Chief of the Army Staff under Mr. Krishna Menon. I, therefore, have no alternative but to submit my resignation.”

Upon hearing this prime minister Jawaharlal Nehru refused to accept his resignation and persuaded him into withdrawing it. In the immediate service that followed, little action was taken on Thimayya's recommendations and Nehru ensured he was checked. Exercise Lal Qila which happened in NEFA during that time also witnessed Menon shelving recommendations of Thimayya.

== After retirement ==
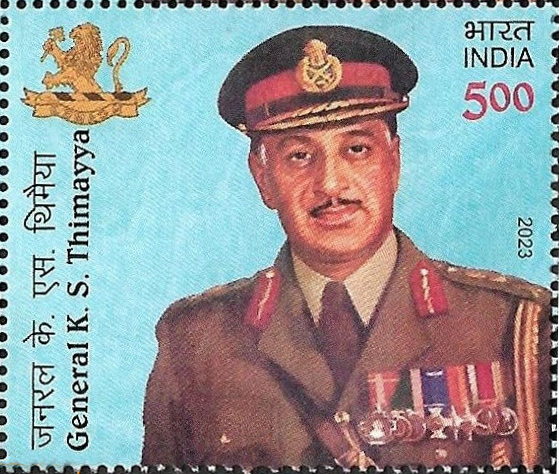
Kodandera Subayya Thimayya on a 2023 stamp of India

After retirement from the Indian Army, the United Nations sought his services yet once again when he was appointed the Commander of UN Forces in Cyprus (UNFICYP) in July 1964. He died during his tenure at UNFICYP in December 1965 and his mortal remains were flown to Bangalore for the last rites.

The street perpendicular to East Street (a road parallel to MG road), Richmond Road in Bangalore, and the main road through Larnaca/Cyprus (East to West) were renamed as Gen Thimmayya Road in his memory. The road perpendicular to Hunsur Road in Mysore is also named as General Thimmayya Road. The Republic of Cyprus, also honored him by issuing a commemorative stamp in his memory in 1966. The General K.S. Thimayya Memorial Trust, a Trust instituted by some Old Boys of Bishop Cotton Boys' School, annually hold the General K S Thimayya Memorial Lecture Series in his memory. General Thimayya enjoys an unmatched legacy in the Indian Army. Of all the eulogies for him, the late Lieutenant General Premindra Singh Bhagat, VC (Retd.) summed it up best, "A General Thimayya is not born in every generation. The likes of him there will seldom be a soldier. The General is a man's man, the Army his soul and his soul the Army." General Thimayya's house "Sunny Side" in Madikeri has been converted into a museum and a war memorial. It was inaugurated in February 2021 in the presence of the President and Chief of Defence Staff.

== Awards and decorations ==

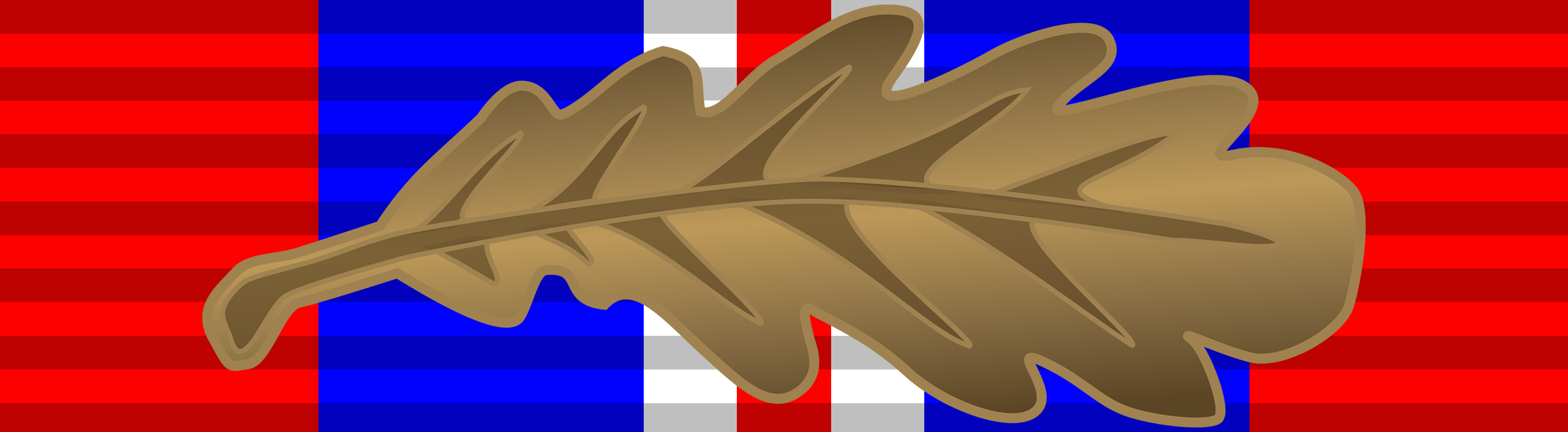

Padma Bhushan	General Service Medal 1947	Indian Independence Medal	Distinguished Service Order
1939–1945 Star	Burma Star	Defence Medal	War Medal 1939–1945 with Mentioned in Despatches(MID) bronze oak leaf

== Dates of rank ==
Insignia	Rank	Component	Date of rank
	Second Lieutenant	British Indian Army	4 February 1926
	Lieutenant	British Indian Army	4 May 1928
	Captain	British Indian Army	4 February 1935
	Major	British Indian Army	1941 (acting); 1 April 1942 (temporary); 4 February 1943 (substantive)
	Lieutenant-Colonel	British Indian Army	19 May 1944 (acting); 19 August 1944 (temporary); 1 October 1946 (war-substantive)
	Colonel	British Indian Army	1 April 1945 (temporary)
	Brigadier	British Indian Army	1 April 1945 (acting); 1 October 1946 (temporary)
	Major	Indian Army	15 August 1947 (Note: Upon independence in 1947, India became a Dominion within the British Commonwealth of Nations. As a result, the rank insignia of the British Army, incorporating the Tudor Crown and four-pointed Bath Star ("pip"), was retained, as George VI remained Commander-in-Chief of the Indian Armed Forces. After 26 January 1950, when India became a republic, the President of India became Commander-in-Chief, and the Ashoka Lion replaced the crown, with a five-pointed star being substituted for the "pip.")
	Major-General	Indian Army	September 1947 (acting); 1 January 1950 (substantive; seniority from 4 February 1949)
	Major-General	Indian Army	26 January 1950 (recommissioning and change in insignia)
	Lieutenant-General	Indian Army	15 January 1953
	General (COAS)	Indian Army	8 May 1957

Military offices
Preceded by S. M. Shrinagesh	Chief of the Army Staff; 1957–1961	Succeeded by Pran Nath Thapar
Preceded by Sant Singh	General Officer Commanding-in-Chief Eastern Command; 1956–1957	Succeeded by S. P. P. Thorat
Preceded by S. M. Shrinagesh	General Officer Commanding-in-Chief Southern Command; 1955–1956	Succeeded by Pran Nath Thapar
Preceded by Kalwant Singh	General Officer Commanding-in-Chief Western Command; 1954–1955	Succeeded by Kalwant Singh
Preceded by S. M. Shrinagesh	General Officer Commanding-in-Chief Western Command; Jan 1953 – Aug 1953	Succeeded by Kalwant Singh
Preceded by Thakur Mahadeo Singh	Commandant of the Indian Military Academy; 1950–1951	Succeeded by Mohinder Singh Wadalia
