= Gurumukhi Superfast Express =

Train in India

Overview
- Service type: Superfast
- First service: 11 October 2010; 15 years ago
- Current operator: Eastern Railway

Route
- Termini: Kolkata (KOAA); Nangal Dam (NLDM)
- Stops: 16
- Distance travelled: 1,806 km (1,122 mi)
- Average journey time: 32 hrs 10 mins
- Service frequency: Weekly
- Train number: 12325 / 12326

On-board services
- Classes: AC 2 Tier, AC 3 Tier, Sleeper 3 Tier, General Unreserved
- Seating arrangements: Yes
- Sleeping arrangements: Yes
- Catering facilities: Pantry Car, On-board catering, E-catering
- Observation facilities: Rake sharing with 13137/13138 Kolkata–Azamgarh Weekly Express
- Baggage facilities: Available
- Other facilities: Below the seats

Technical
- Rolling stock: LHB coach
- Track gauge: 1,676 mm (5 ft 6 in)
- Operating speed: 56 km/h (35 mph) average including halts. 130 km/h (81 mph) Operating speed

The 12325 / 12326 Gurumukhi Superfast Express is an superfast express train of the Indian Railways connecting Kolkata in West Bengal with Nangal Dam in Punjab. It is currently being operated with 12325/12326 train numbers on once in week basis.

== History ==
Following the 10 years of immense success of Akal Takht Express in connecting Kolkata with Sri Akal Takht Sahib, Akal Takht, demand to connect Shri Anandpur Sahib & Shri Kiratpur Sahib with Kolkata grew considerably. Hence in 2010, the then Railway Minister introduced Kolkata - Nangal Dam Express. Originally named as Baba Nanak Express, it was later changed to Guru Granth Sahib Express & finally named Gurumukhi Express in 2012. Originally timings were proposed as a double nighter train. 12325 was set for Kolkata 21.40 pm; Asansol 00.45 am; Patna 06.55 am; Mughalsarai 10.30 am; Varanasi 11.16 am; Sultanpur 13.34 pm; Lucknow 16.10 pm; Bareilly 19.55 pm; Moradabad 21.40 pm; Saharanpur 01.00 am; Ambala 02.20 am; Nangal Dam 05.25 am timings & 12326 was set for Nangal Dam 07.00 am; Ambala 10.05 am & then nearly follows the 12318 Akal Takht Express in Ambala - Kolkata part journey arriving at 15.00 pm. Later 12325 timings were finalized following the 12317 Akal Takht Express in Kolkata - Ambala part of journey, making with arrive Nangal Dam at 15.40 pm.

== Service ==
The 12325/Gurumukhi SF Express has an average speed of 56.5 km/h and covers 1806 km in 32 hrs 00 mins. 12325/Gurumukhi SF Express has an average speed of 56.5 km/h and covers 1806 km in 32 hrs 00 mins.

== 12325 Route & halts ==
Station Code	Station Name	Arrival	Departure
KOAA	Kolkata Terminus	---	07:40
ASN	Asansol Junction	10:35	10:45
MDP	Madhupur Junction	12:00	12:02
JSME	Jasidh Junction	12:29	12:31
JAJ	Jhajha	13:11	13:13
KIUL	Kiul Junction	13:57	13:59
MKA	Mokama	14:28	14:30
PNC	Patna Saheb	15:17	15:22
PNBE	Patna Junction	15:55	16:05
DDU	Pt DD Upadhyaya Junction	19:35	19:45
BSB	Varanasi Junction	20:30	20:40
SLN	Sultanpur Junction	22:46	22:48
LKO	Lucknow Charbagh NR	02:43	02:53
BE	Bareilly Junction	06:13	06:15
MB	Moradabad Junction	07:50	08:00
NBD	Najibabad Junction	09:30	09:32
SRE	Saharanpur Junction	11:10	11:20
UMB	Ambala Cantt Junction	12:35	12:40
SIR	Sirhind Junction	13:25	13:27
RPAR	Rupnagar	14:26	14:28
ANSB	Anandpur Sahib	15:10	15:12
NLDM	Nangal Dam	15:40	---

== 12325 Route & halts ==
Station Code	Station Name	Arrival	Departure
NLDM	Nangal Dam	---	07:00
ANSB	Anandpur Sahib	07:20	07:22
RPAR	Rupnagar	08:04	08:06
SIR	Sirhind Junction	09:05	09:07
UMB	Ambala Cantt Junction	10:00	10.05
SRE	Saharanpur Junction	11:30	11:40
NBD	Najibabad Junction	13:14	13:16
MB	Moradabad Junction	14:55	15:05
BE	Bareilly Junction	16:35	16:40
LKO	Lucknow Charbagh NR	20:35	20:50
SLN	Sultanpur Junction	23:05	23:10
BSB	Varanasi Junction	01:40	01:50
DDU	Pt DD Upadhyaya Junction	02:25	02:40
PNBE	Patna Junction	06:00	06:10
PNC	Patna Saheb	06:22	06:24
MKA	Mokama	07:29	07:31
KIUL	Kiul Junction	08:10	08:12
JAJ	Jhajha	09:02	09.04
JSME	Jasidh Junction	09:48	09:50
MDP	Madhupur Junction	10:17	10:19
ASN	Asansol Junction	11:40	11:50
KOAA	Kolkata Terminus	---	15:00

== Traction ==
As the route is fully electrified, it is hauled by a Sealdah Loco Shed based WAP-7 locomotive from Kolkata to Nangal Dam, and vice versa.

== Rake sharing and maintenance ==
The train is maintained by the Kolkata Coaching Depot. The same rake is used for 13137/13138 Kolkata–Azamgarh Weekly Express for one way which is altered by the second rake on the other way.

== Coach composition ==
The train consists of 20 LHB coach:

- 2 AC II Tier
- 4 AC III Tier
- 7 Sleeper coaches
- 4 General
- 1 Pantry Car
- 2 Second-class Luggage/parcel van
