= Barrackpore railway station =

Major railway station serving Barrackpore in North 24 Parganas, West Bengal, India

Barrackpore ব্যারাকপুর
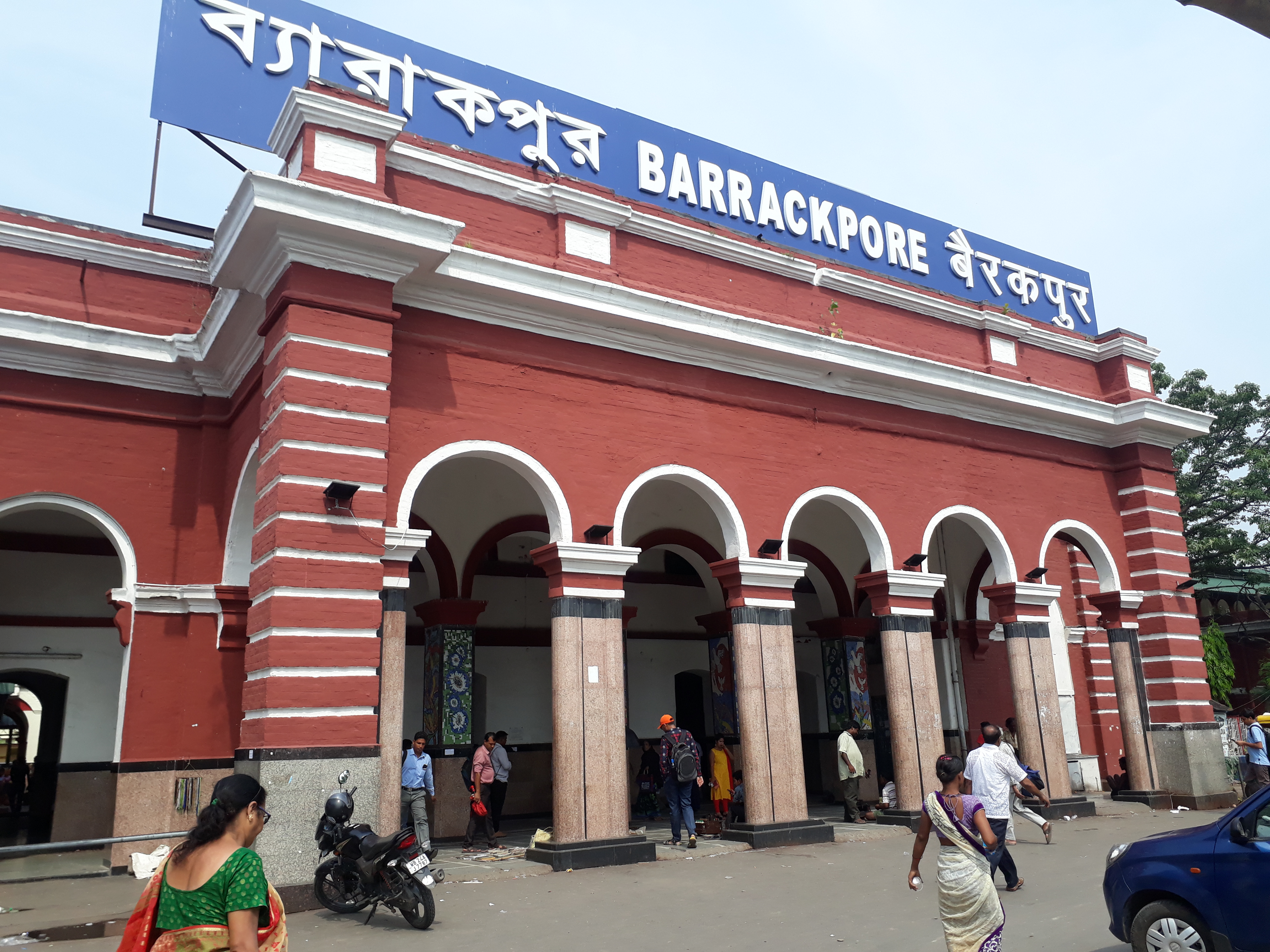
- Barrackpore railway station entrance in 2019

General information
- Location: near S. N. Banerjee Road, Barrackpore, North 24 Parganas district, West Bengal; India
- Coordinates: 22°45′37″N 88°22′16″E
- Elevation: 12 metres (39 ft)
- System: Kolkata Suburban Railway
- Owner: Indian Railways
- Operator: Eastern Railway
- Line: Sealdah–Ranaghat line of Kolkata Suburban Railway
- Platforms: 5 (1,1A,2,3,4)
- Tracks: 6
- Connections: : 85, 81, E32, C29, S11, C28, ACT34, S34B, S32

Construction
- Structure type: At grade
- Parking: Available
- Cycle facilities: Available
- Accessible: No; Under-construction

Other information
- Status: Functioning
- Station code: BP
- Zone(s): Eastern Railway zone
- Division(s): Sealdah

History
- Opened: 1862; 164 years ago
- Electrified: 1963–1965; 61 years ago 25 KV AC overhead line
- Former names: Eastern Bengal Railway

Services
Preceding station	Kolkata Suburban Railway	Following station
Titagarh towards Sealdah	Eastern Line Main line	Palta towards Ranaghat Junction
Route map
Location
- Location within West Bengal Location within India

Barrackpore (Station Code: BP) is a SG-2 graded major railway station in the Kolkata Metropolitan Area of North 24 Parganas district in the Indian state of West Bengal. It serves Barrackpore and its surrounding areas. It lies on the Sealdah–Ranaghat line and is under the jurisdiction of Eastern Railway.

== History ==
The Sealdah–Kusthia line of the Eastern Bengal Railway was opened to railway traffic in the year 1862. Eastern Bengal Railway used to work only on the eastern side of the Hooghly River. Barrackpore has been serviced by rail since 1862.

== Layout ==
G	Street Level	Exit / Entrance (West / Main Gate)
FOB	Station Building (Concourse)	Ticket Counter, ATM, Vending Machine (ATVM), GRP Post, and RPF Police Station
P	Platform 1: Side platform, Doors will open on the left side
P	↔ Train terminating/originating Sealdah–Ranaghat Loop Line (UP) towards Naihati Junction (Palta) →
P	↔ Train terminating/originating Sealdah–Ranaghat Main Line (UP) towards Naihati Junction (Palta) →
P	Platform 1A: Side platform, Doors will open on the right side
P	← Sealdah–Ranaghat Main line DOWN trains towards Sealdah (Titagarh)
P	Platform 2 / Platform 3: Island platform, Doors will open on the left side
P	Sealdah–Ranaghat line UP trains towards Naihati Junction (Palta) →
P	↔ Loop line from Platform 3 and Platform 4 ↔
P	← Sealdah–Ranaghat line DOWN trains towards Sealdah/Kolkata (Titagarh)
P	Platform 4: Side platform, Door will open on the left side
FOB	Concourse / East Building	Ticket Counter, ATVM
G	Street Level	Exit / Entrance (East Gate)

== Route ==
It takes about 35–40 minutes by suburban train to reach Barrackpore from Sealdah. As it is located in the suburban region of Kolkata, most municipalities of the Barrackpore Subdivision are connected by local train (slow and semi fast) services with Kolkata and Sealdah and fast services to surrounding areas in and around the state. The Sealdah–Ranaghat line runs through this sub-division and connects to Bongaon, Dankuni, Howrah, Burdwan, and Bandel. It is part of the Kolkata Suburban Railway system. The Circular Railways also runs services to and from the station.

== Station complex ==
The platforms are fully sheltered. It has a large number of facilities including staffed ticket counters, automatic ticketing machines, drinking water taps and sanitation facilities. The Second class waiting room is present on Platform 1, proximate to the Station Master’s office. It is present at the interchange between the Ghoshpara Road and S. N. Banerjee Road. It is in close proximity to the BT Road.

There are in total 5 entrances.

- Main Building
  - Station Concourse
  - Platform 1
  - Main Booking Office
  - Foot Overbridge 1
- Annex Entrance
  - Front end of Platform 1
  - Booking Office 4
  - Foot Overbridge 2
- H Road Entrance
  - Booking Office 3
  - Platform 4
  - Sub-Foot Overbridge (to Platform 3 & 2)
- Old Calcutta Road Entrance
  - Booking Office 2
  - Platform 4
  - Track level Crossing

== Mail trains ==
=== Present trains ===
Trains halted at Barrackpore as of 2026
Train	Train number		Termini 1	Termini 2	Service days (Note: Ticks is marked for both Up and Down trains, including weekly trains.)						
Train	UP	DOWN	Termini 1	Termini 2	S	M	T	W	T	F	S
Jangipur Road Express	13177	13178	Sealdah	Jangipur Road	X mark	check	check	check	check	check	check
Asansol Intercity Express	12383	12384	Sealdah	Asansol Junction	X mark	check	check	check	check	check	check
Maa Tara Express	13187	13188	Sealdah	Rampurhat Junction	check	check	check	check	check	check	check
Hazarduari Express	13113	13114	Kolkata	Lalgola	check	check	check	check	check	check	check
Azamgarh Weekly Express	13137 (Note: Departs on Monday, reaches on Azamgarh at Tuesday.)	13138 (Note: Departs on Tuesday, reaches on Kolkata at Wednesday.)	Kolkata	Azamgarh	X mark	check	X mark	check	X mark	X mark	X mark

=== Trains previously halted ===
Trains formerly halted at Barrackpore before 2026
Train	Train number		Termini 1	Termini 2	Halt withdrawn
Train	UP	DOWN	Termini 1	Termini 2	Halt withdrawn
Sitamarhi Express	13165	13166	Kolkata	Sitamarhi Junction	2021
Pratham Swatrantata Sangram Express	22197	22198	Kolkata	Jhansi Junction	2022

== Electrification ==
The Sealdah–Ranaghat sector was electrified in 1963–65. Barrackpore was included in that sector.

== Transit Services ==
The Station is at the epicentre of the city and therefore is well connected to the various areas in and around the Subdivision. Buses, E-Rickshaws, Cycle Rickshaws and Auto Rickshaws are some of the few modes of transport that can be availed.

E Rickshaw

- Barrackpore Station to Wireless More (SH2 and Kalyani Expressway Crossing)
- Barrackpore Station to Jaffarpore Rd. - Kalyani Expressway Crossing (via Kalianibas)
- Barrackpore Station to Dhobi Ghat (Route Tentative)

Auto Rickshaw

- Barrackpore Station to Nilgunge Bazaar
- Barrackpore Station to Barasat
- Barrackpore Station to Shyamnagar Chowrangee
- Barrackpore Station to Dui Poisar Ghat
- Barrackpore Station to Sodepur More (on B.T. Road)
- Barrackpore Station to Baranagar (Dunlop)
- Barrackpore 14 No. Railway Gate to Patulia
- Barrackpore 14 No. Railway Gate to Bheri Gate

Buses

- Private Buses (Operated by Bus Associations)
  - 81 (Barrackpore Fishery Gate - Barasat)
  - 81/1 (Barasat - Rajchandrapur {via Bally Halt})
  - 85 (Barrackpore - Kanchrapara)
  - MM5 (Barrackpore - Habra)
  - 78 (Barrackpore - Esplanade {Dhurumtolla})
  - Barrackpore Lalkuthi to Howrah Station
  - Naihati to Egra
  - Kamalpur to Barasat
- Government Buses (Operated by West Bengal Transport Corporation)
  - E32 (Nilgunge Depot to Howrah Station)
  - C28 (Barrackpore Station to Howrah Station)
  - C29 (Barrackpore to Barasat)
  - DS34 (Barrackpore Court to Barasat)
  - S11 (Nilgunge Depot to Esplanade)
  - AC55 (Barrackpore Station to Newtown)
  - S32 (Barrackpore to Howrah Station)
  - S34C (West Bengal State University to Nagerbazaar)
  - ACT32 (Barrackpore Lalkuthi to Howrah Station)
  - ACT34 (Barrackpore Lalkuthi to Tollygunge)
  - ACT38 (Barrackpore Lalkuthi to Saltlake Karunamoyee)
  - AC20 (Barrackpore to Santraganchi)

== Barrackpore Racecourse railway station ==
This station used to be a branch line originating from Barrackpore station (code : BPPS) that served the Barrackpore Cantonment area. Barrackpore had a race course behind the civil and criminal court and a special single rail track took steam engine-driven trains there, carrying British passengers who would attend the race. The line has been depreciated since and that railway station is used by the Indian Army only. There are annual maintenance runs operated by the Diesel Inspection Carriage registered and stationed here.

== Gallery ==
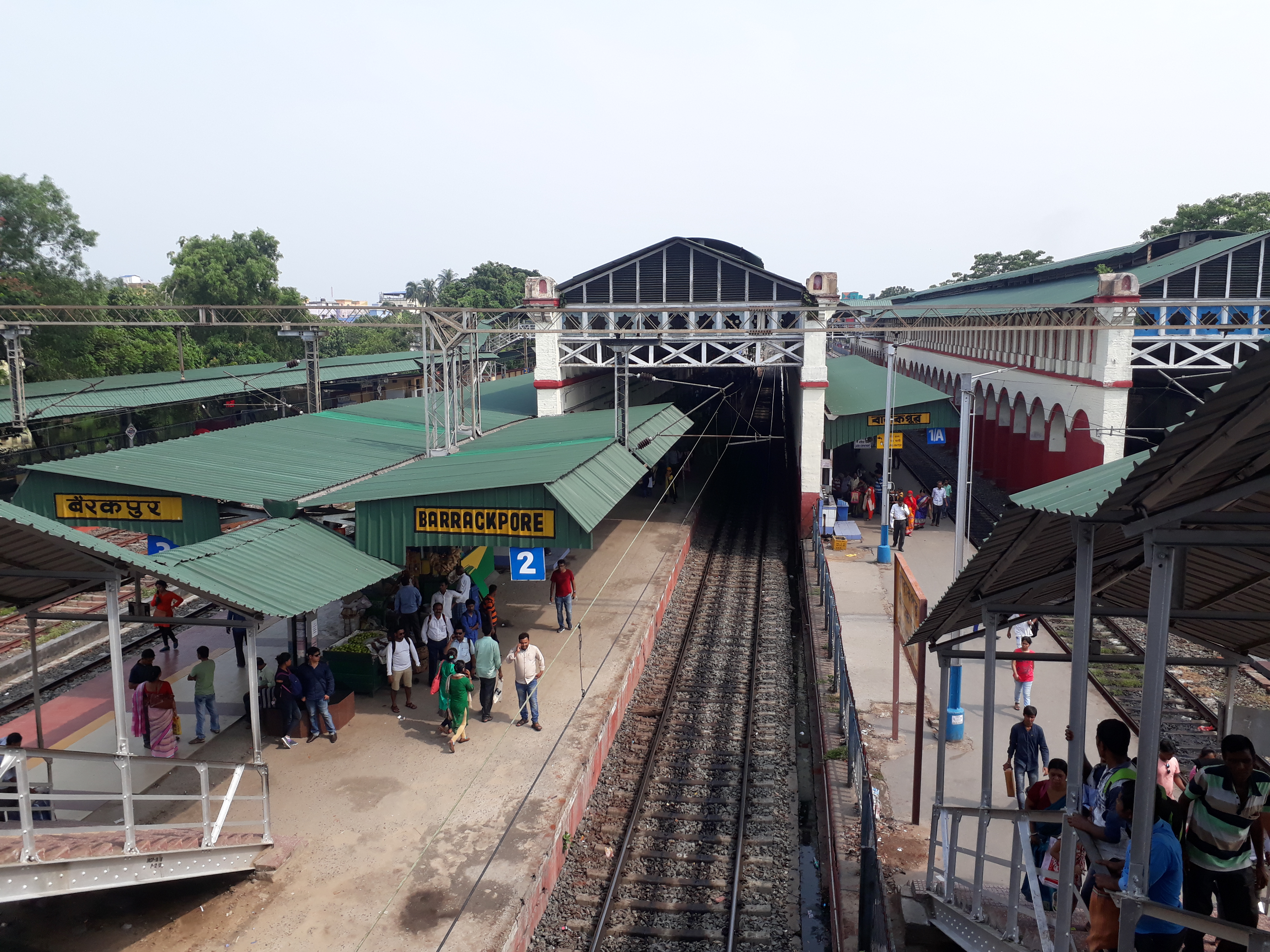
Barrackpore Railway Station Platforms, platforms 3, 2 and 1A

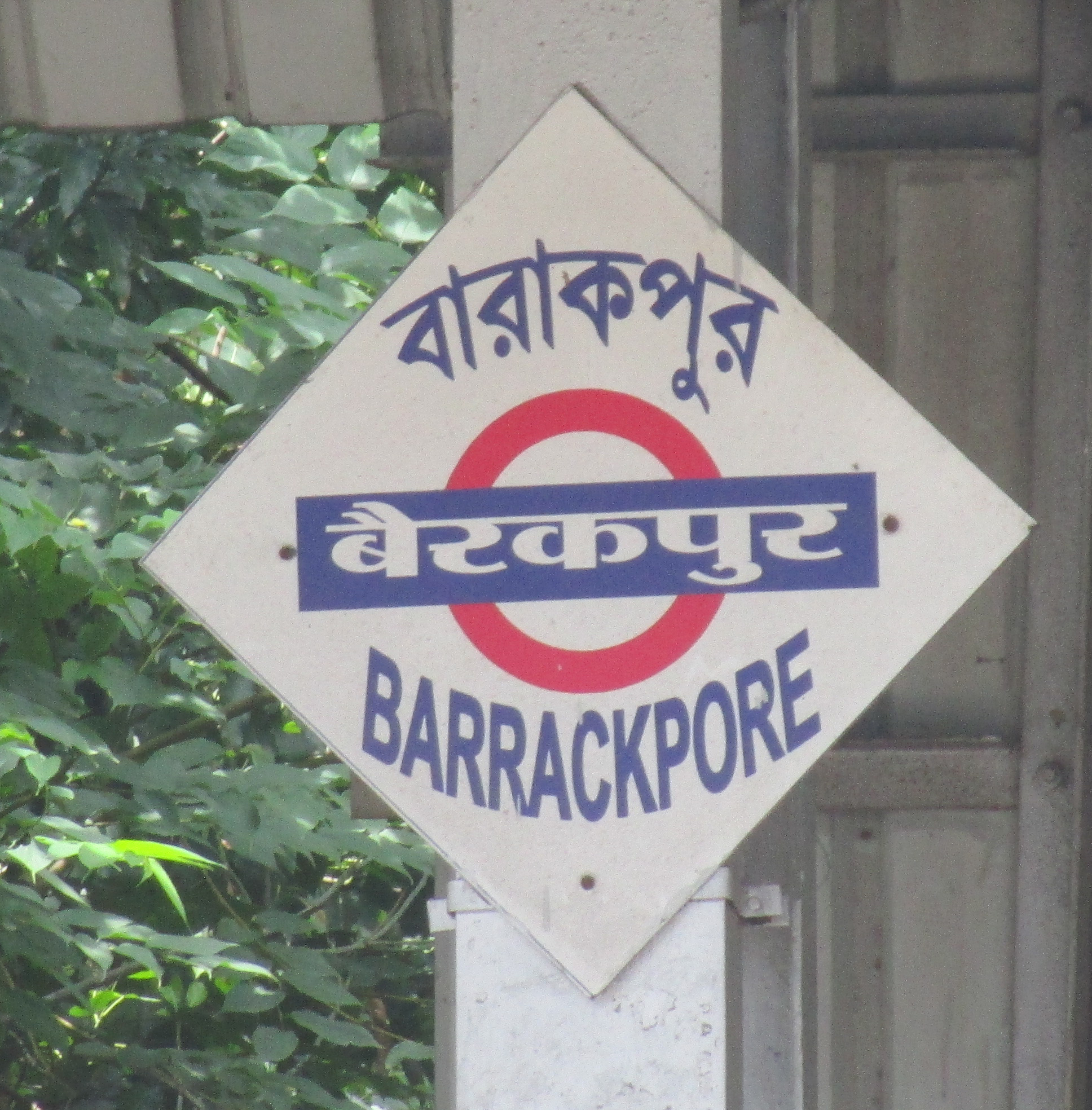
Barrackpore Railway Station Platform Board

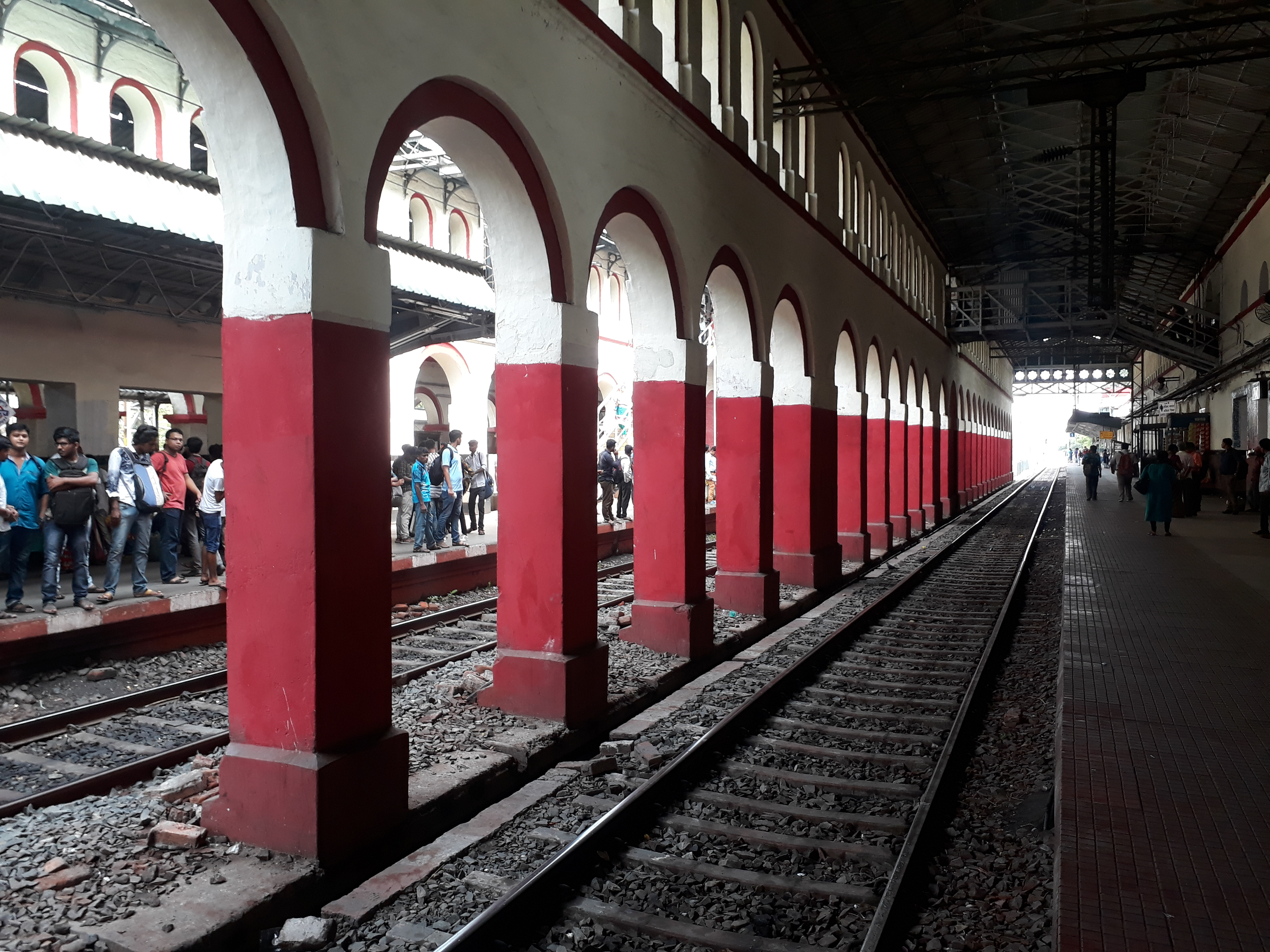
Internal architecture of Barrackpore Railway Station, mainly Platform 1 and 1A
