= Kolkata–Jogbani Express =

Train of India

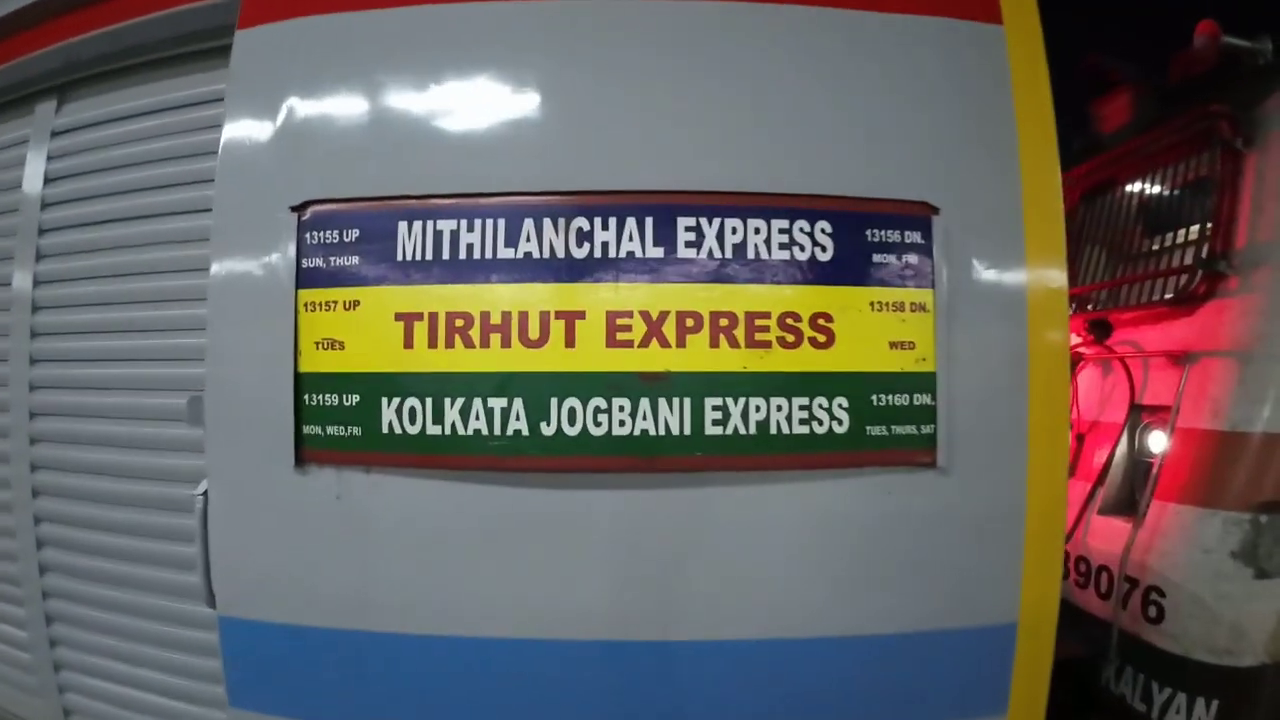
- Arriving at Purnia Junction

Overview
- Service type: Express
- Current operator: Eastern Railway zone

Route
- Termini: Kolkata (KOAA); Jogbani (JBN)
- Stops: 14
- Distance travelled: 547 km (340 mi)
- Average journey time: 14h 20m
- Service frequency: Thrice (Note: Runs three days in a week for every direction.)
- Train number: 13159/13160

On-board services
- Classes: AC III Tier, AC III Tier, Sleeper Coaches, General Unreserved
- Seating arrangements: No
- Sleeping arrangements: Yes
- Catering facilities: On-board catering E-catering
- Observation facilities: LHB Coach
- Entertainment facilities: No
- Baggage facilities: No
- Other facilities: Below the seats

Technical
- Rolling stock: 2
- Track gauge: 1,676 mm (5 ft 6 in)
- Operating speed: 38 km/h (24 mph), including halts

The Kolkata–Jogbani Express is an Express train belonging to Eastern Railway zone that runs between Kolkata and Jogbani in India via Barddhaman, Rampurhat, Katihar. It is currently being operated with 13159/13160 train numbers on thrice in a week basis.

== Service ==
The 13159/Kolkata–Jogbani Express has an average speed of 38 km/h and covers 547 km in 14h 20m. The 13160/Jogbani–Kolkata Express has an average speed of 43 km/h and covers 547 km in 12h 45m.

== Route and halts ==
The important halts of the train are:

- Kolkata
- Naihati Junction
- Barddhaman Junction
- Bolpur Shantiniketan
- Rampurhat Junction
- Pakur
- New Farakka Junction
- Malda Town
- Samsi
- Harischandrapur
- Kumedpur Junction
- Katihar Junction
- Purnia Junction
- Araria Court
- Forbesganj Junction
- Jogbani

Note: Bold letters indicates Major Railway Stations/Major Cities.

== Coach composition ==
The train has standard ICF rakes with max speed of 110 kmph. The train consists of 20 coaches:

Loco	1	2	3	4	5	6	7	8	9	10	11	12	13	14	15	16	17	18	19	20	21	22
	SLR	GN	GN	S1	S2	S3	S4	S5	S6	S7	S8	S9	S10	B1	B2	B3	B4	B5	A1	GN	GN	EOG

== Traction ==
Both trains are hauled by an Electric Loco Shed, Howrah-based WAP-4 from Kolkata till Katihar Junction after which a Diesel Loco Shed, Siliguri-based WDP-4 took charge for rest of the journey till Jogbani.

== Direction reversal ==
The train reverses its direction 1 times:

- Katihar Junction

== Rake sharing ==
The trains shares its rake with

- 13157/13158 Tirhut Express
- 13155/13156 Mithilanchal Express
- 13165/13166 Kolkata–Sitamarhi Express

== See also ==
- Kolkata railway station
- Kolkata–Sitamarhi Express
- Mithilanchal Express

== Notes ==
3 times in a week Train runs
