= Durgiana Express =

Train in India

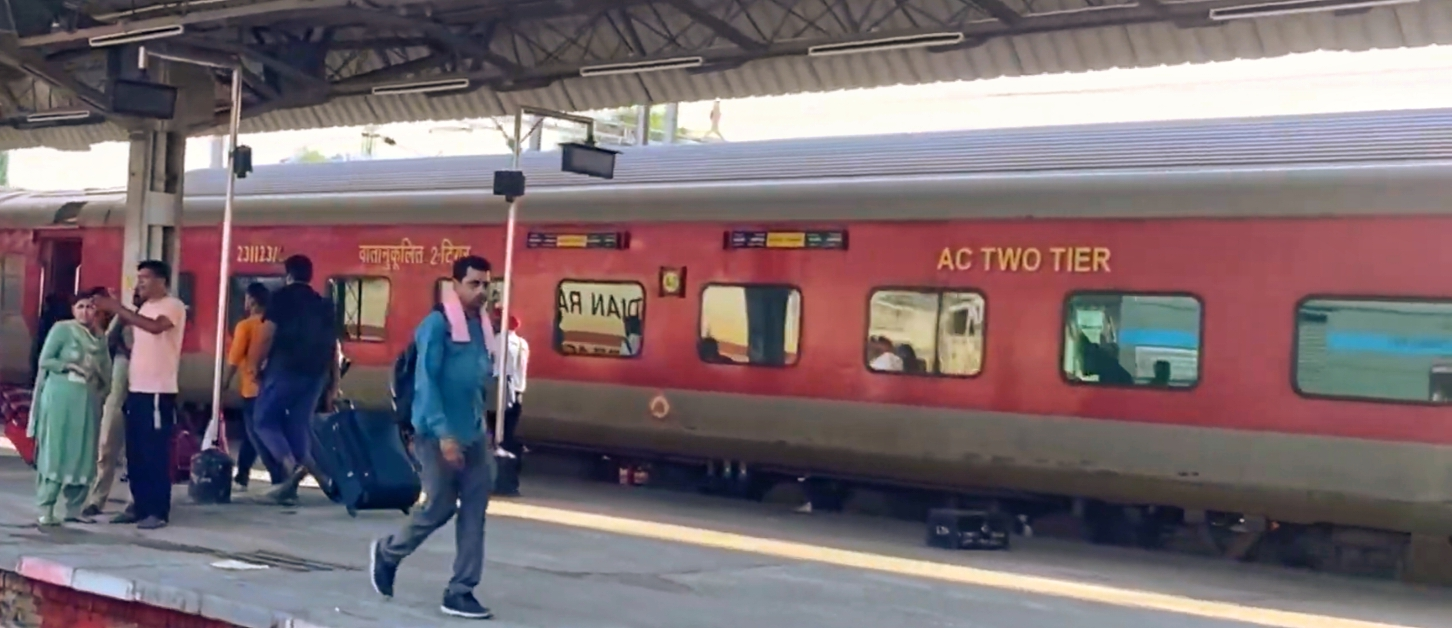
- Durgiana Express At Ludhiana Junction railway station

Overview
- Service type: Superfast
- First service: 16 March 2010; 16 years ago
- Current operator: Eastern Railway

Route
- Termini: Kolkata (KOAA); Amritsar (ASR)
- Stops: 15
- Distance travelled: 1,818 km (1,130 mi)
- Average journey time: 29 hours 10 minutes
- Service frequency: Bi–weekly
- Train number: 12357 / 12358

On-board services
- Classes: AC 2 tier, AC 3 tier, Sleeper class, General Unreserved
- Seating arrangements: No
- Sleeping arrangements: Yes
- Catering facilities: On-board catering, E-catering
- Observation facilities: Large windows
- Baggage facilities: Available
- Other facilities: Below the seats

Technical
- Rolling stock: LHB coach
- Track gauge: 1,676 mm (5 ft 6 in)
- Operating speed: 62 km/h (39 mph) average including halts.

The 12357 / 12358 Durgiana Express is a Superfast train of the Indian Railways connecting Kolkata in West Bengal and Amritsar Junction of Punjab. It is currently being operated with 12357/12358 train numbers on a twice a week basis.

== Service ==
The 12357/Durgiana Express has an average speed of 62 km/h and covers 1818 km in 29 hrs 10 mins. 12358/Durgiana Express has an average speed of 61 km/h and covers 1818 km in 29 hrs 40 mins. Earlier it used to run nonstop between Lucknow NR and Moradabad JN, but then got the halt at Bareilly JN. Maximum permissible speed till DDU is 130 km/h, from DDU to LKO it is 110 km/h, from LKO to MB it is 100 km/h, from MB to UMB it is 110 km/h, from UMB to LDH it is 130 km/h again, and from LDH to ASR it is 110 km/h, and vice versa.

Durgiana express were comes in rail budget as Kolkata Amritsar doronto but afterwards it is named as Durgiana Express but the time table remains same. In a few stations like Varanasi Jn., Pandit Deen Dayal Upadhya Jn. it is still announced as the Kolkata Amritsar Doronto Express.

It is the fastest train in the superfast category on the grand chord line (4th fastest train between Ddu to KOAA after Howrah Rajdhani, Sealdah Rajdhani and Sealdah doronto). It gets high priority on its route.

The Durgiana express route is permanently diverted in Varanasi Lucknow section. Earlier it reached Lucknow from Varanasi via Sultanpur but now it reaches Lucknow via Pratapgarh, and vice versa.

== Route and halts ==
The important halts of the train are:

- Kolkata
- Asansol Junction
- Dhanbad Junction
- Parasnath
- Gaya Junction
- Sasaram Junction
- Mughalsarai Junction
- Varanasi Junction
- Lucknow Charbagh
- Bareilly Junction
- Moradabad Junction
- Saharanpur Junction
- Ambala Cantt Junction
- Ludhiana Junction
- Jalandhar City Junction
- Beas Junction
- Amritsar Junction

== Coach composition ==
The train has standard LHB rakes with a maximum speed of 130 km/h. The train consists of 22 coaches:

- 2 AC II Tier
- 6 AC III Tier
- 9 sleeper coaches
- 3 general
- 2 EOGs

== Traction ==
Both trains are hauled by a Sealdah Loco Shed or Howrah Loco Shed-based WAP-7 electric locomotive from Kolkata to Amritsar and vice versa.

== Rake sharing ==
This train shares its rake with:

- 12319/12320 Kolkata-Gwalior Superfast Express
- 13135/13136 Kolkata–Jaynagar Weekly Express

== See also ==
- Kolkata railway station
- Amritsar Junction railway station
- Kolkata–Agra Cantonment Superfast Express
- Kolkata–Jaynagar Weekly Express
- Howrah–Amritsar Express
