= Kolkata–Sitamarhi Express =

Train in India

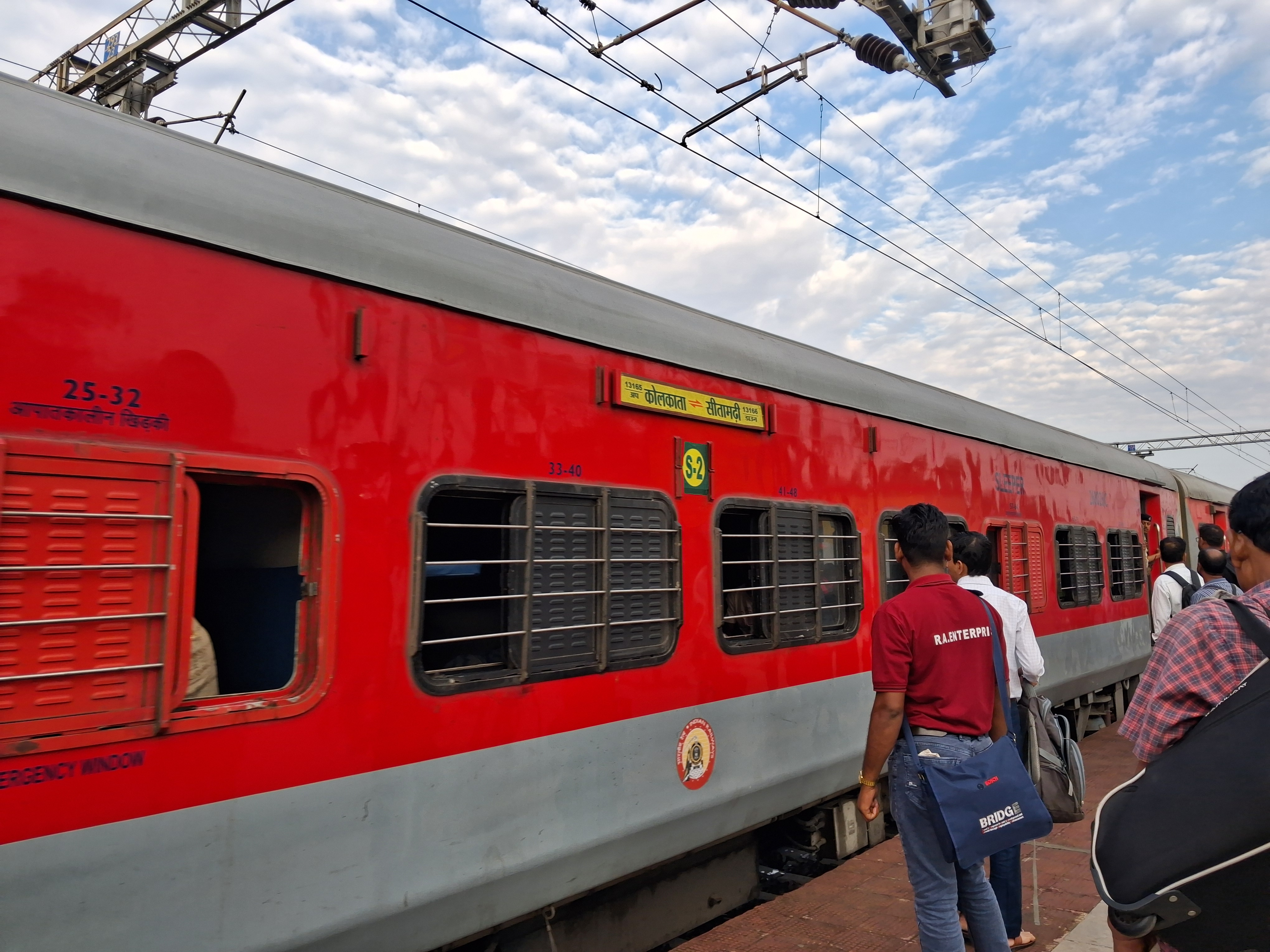
- Kolkata Sitamarhi Express at Madhupur Junction

Overview
- Service type: Express
- First service: 7 December 2013; 12 years ago
- Current operator: Eastern Railway zone

Route
- Termini: Kolkata (KOAA); Sitamarhi Junction (SMI)
- Stops: 13
- Distance travelled: 608 km (378 mi)
- Average journey time: 14h 5m
- Service frequency: Weekly (Note: Runs one day in a week for every direction.)
- Train number: 13165/13166

On-board services
- Classes: AC III Tier, AC III Tier, Sleeper coaches, General Unreserved
- Seating arrangements: No
- Sleeping arrangements: Yes
- Catering facilities: On-board catering E-catering
- Observation facilities: Large Windows
- Entertainment facilities: No
- Baggage facilities: No
- Other facilities: Below the seats

Technical
- Rolling stock: LHB coach
- Track gauge: 1,676 mm (5 ft 6 in)
- Operating speed: 43 km/h (27 mph), including halts

The Kolkata–Sitamarhi Express is an Express train belonging to Eastern Railway zone that runs between Kolkata and Sitamarhi Junction in India. It is currently being operated with 13165/13166 train numbers on a weekly basis.

== Service ==
The 13165/Kolkata–Sitamarhi Express and 13166/Sitamarhi–Kolkata Express both have an average speed of 43 kilometres per hour (27 mph) and cover 608 kilometres (378 mi) in 14h 15m.

== Route and halts ==
The important halts of the train are:

- Kolkata
- Barddhaman Junction
- Durgapur
- Asansol Junction
- Chittaranjan
- Madhupur Junction
- Jasidih Junction
- Jhajha
- Kiul Junction
- Lakhisarai Junction
- Barauni Junction
- Samastipur Junction
- Laheriasarai
- Darbhanga Junction
- Janakpur Road
- Sitamarhi Junction

Barrackpore and Naihati Jn were former halts until the train was diverted on Howrah–Barddhaman chord line since 2021.

== Coach composition ==
The train has standard ICF rakes with max speed of 110 kmph. The train consists of 16 coaches:

- 2 AC III Tier
- 6 Sleeper coaches
- 6 General
- 2 Seating cum Luggage Rake

== Traction ==
Both trains are hauled by an Asansol Loco Shed-based WAP-4 electric locomotive from Kolkata to Samastipur. From Samastipur it is hauled by a Samastipur Loco Shed-based WDP 4 diesel locomotive up till Sitamarhi, and vice versa.

== Rake sharing ==
The trains shares its rake with

- 13157/13158 Tirhut Express
- 13159/13160 Kolkata–Jogbani Express
- 13155/13156 Mithilanchal Express

== See also ==
- Kolkata railway station
- Sitamarhi Junction railway station
- Mithilanchal Express
- Rajdhani Express
- Vande Bharat Express
