= Kolkata–Agra Cantonment Superfast Express =

Gwalior Kolkata Superfast Express
Overview
- Service type: Superfast Express
- Current operator: Eastern Railways

Route
- Termini: Kolkata Railway Station; Gwalior Junction
- Stops: 15
- Distance travelled: 1,539 km (956 mi)
- Service frequency: Once a week: 12319 Kolkata Gwalior Superfast Express–Wednesday, 12320 Gwalior Kolkata Superfast Express – Thursday
- Train number: 12319/12320

On-board services
- Classes: AC 2 tier, AC 3 tier, Sleeper class, General Unreserved
- Seating arrangements: Yes
- Sleeping arrangements: Yes
- Catering facilities: Not available (no pantry car)
- Observation facilities: LHB coach

Technical
- Rolling stock: Standard Indian Railways coaches
- Track gauge: 1,676 mm (5 ft 6 in)
- Electrification: Partial
- Operating speed: 130 km/h (81 mph) maximum, 64 km/h (40 mph), including halts.

The 12319 / 20 Gwalior-KolkataSuperfast Express is a Superfast Express train belonging to Indian Railways – Eastern Railway zone that runs between Kolkata Railway Station and Gwalior Junction in India.

It operates as train number 12319 from Kolkata to Gwalior and as train number 12320 from Gwalior to Kolkata, serving the states of West Bengal, Jharkhand, Bihar, Uttar Pradesh, Rajasthan and Madhya Pradesh.

== Coaches ==
The 12319 / 20 Kolkata Chitpur–GwaliorSuperfast Express has 1 AC 2 tier, 4 AC 3 tier, 8 sleeper class, 3 general unreserved and 2 EoG (generator van) coaches. It does not carry a pantry car.

Now the full rake is using LHB coach.

As is customary with most train services in India, coach composition may be amended at the discretion of Indian Railways depending on demand.

== Service ==
The 12319 Kolkata–Gwalior Superfast Express covers the distance of 1,539 km (956 mi) in 24 hours (61.53 km/h) and in 25 hours 25 mins as 12320 Gwalior–Kolkata Superfast Express (57.74 km/h).

As the average speed of the train is above 64 km/h (40 mph), as per Indian Railway rules, its fare includes a Superfast surcharge.

== Routeing ==
The 12319 / 20 Kolkata Chitpur– Gwalior Superfast Express runs from Kolkata Chitpur via Durgapur, Asansol Junction, Dhanbad Junction, Gaya Junction, Mughalsarai Junction, Kanpur Central, Mathura Junction, Agra Cantonment to Gwalior Junction.

== Traction ==
This train is hauled by a Sealdah-based WAP-7 from Kolkata to Gwalior and vice versa.

== Rake sharing ==
This train shares its rake with:

- 12357/12358 Durgiana Express
- 13135/13136 Kolkata–Jaynagar Weekly Express

== Operation ==
12319 Kolkata Gwalior SF Express runs from Kolkata Chitpur every Wednesday reaching Gwalior on the next day.

12320 Gwalior Kolkata Express runs from Gwalior Junction Station every Thursday reaching Kolkata Station on the next day.
