= Sealdah–Asansol Intercity Express =

Passenger train in India

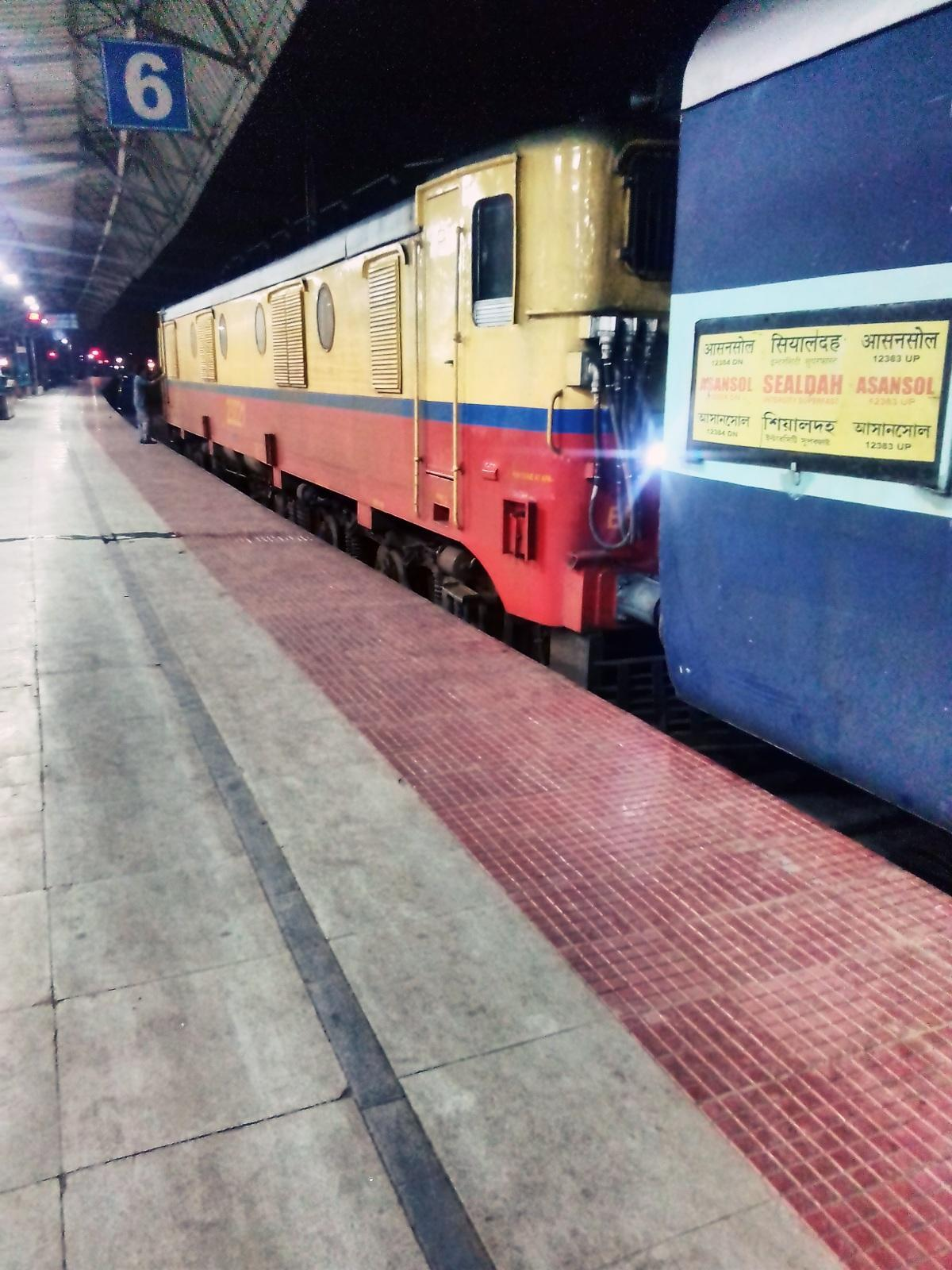
- Intercity Express at Asansol Junction

Overview
- Service type: Express
- First service: 12 December 2003; 22 years ago
- Current operator: Eastern Railway

Route
- Termini: Sealdah (SDAH); Asansol (ASN)
- Stops: 8
- Distance travelled: 220 km (137 mi)
- Average journey time: 4 hours
- Service frequency: Daily (Except Sunday)
- Train number: 12383 / 12384

On-board services
- Classes: General Unreserved, Second Sitting, Third AC
- Seating arrangements: Yes
- Sleeping arrangements: No
- Auto-rack arrangements: Overhead racks
- Catering facilities: On-board catering, E-catering
- Observation facilities: Below the seats
- Baggage facilities: No

Technical
- Rolling stock: ICF coach
- Track gauge: 1,676 mm (5 ft 6 in)
- Operating speed: 54 km/h (34 mph) avg 110 km/h (68 mph) max
Route map
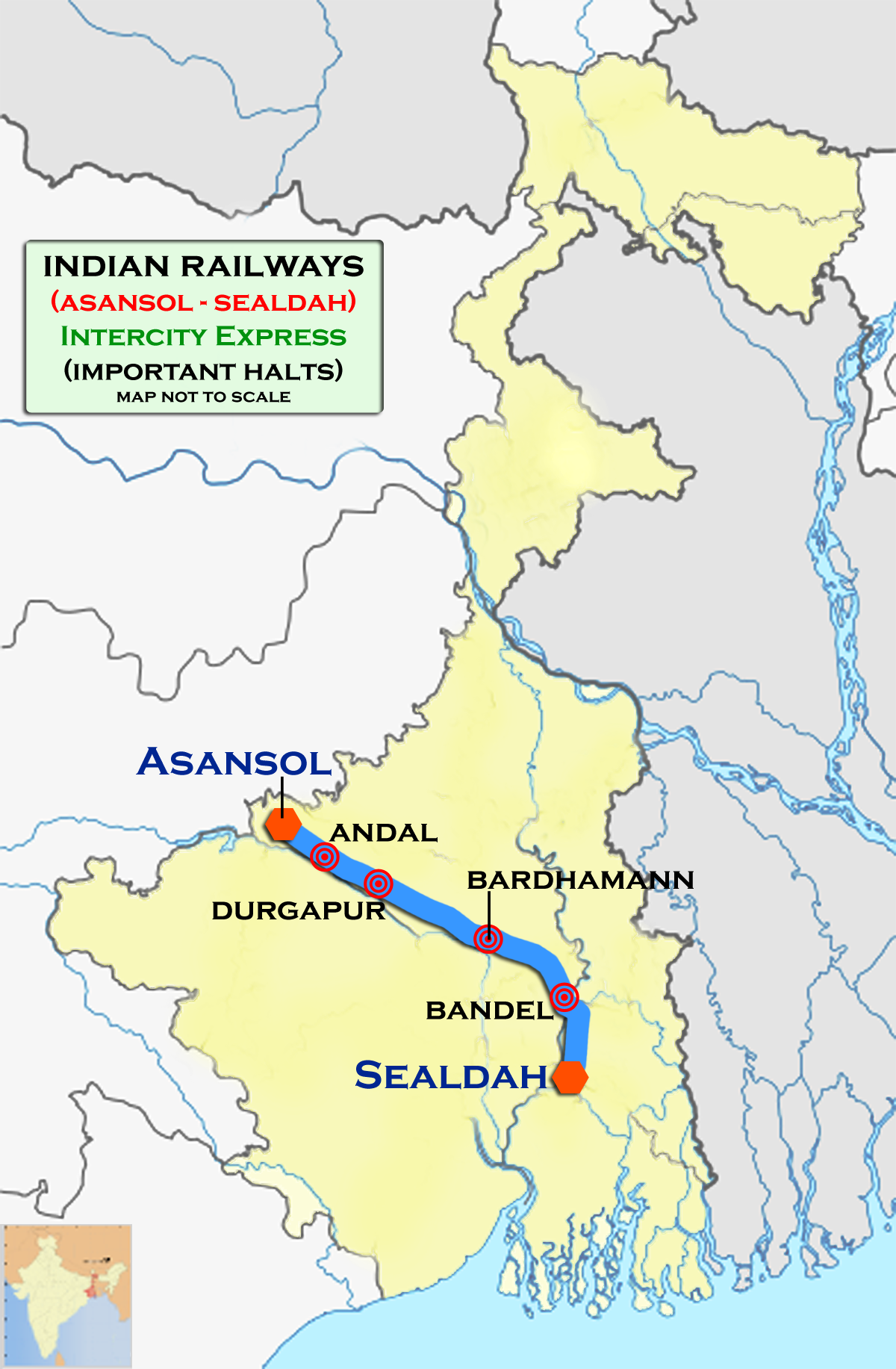

The 12383 / 12384 Sealdah – Asansol Intercity Express is a superfast express train belonging to Indian Railways that runs between Sealdah (SDAH) and Asansol Junction (ASN) in India. It is operated by the Eastern Railway, maintained at ASN.

It operates as train number 12383 from Sealdah to Asansol Jn and as train number 12384 in the reverse direction, serving an important stretch in the state of West Bengal.

== Coaches ==
The 12383 / 12384 Sealdah - Asansol - Sealdah Intercity Express has a total of 14 coaches, which comprises:

- 1 2S (Second Seating Chair Car)
- 1 3AC (AC 3 Tier)
- 10 GEN (General / Unreserved)
- 2 SLR (Seating with Luggage Rake)

It does not have a pantry car.

== Service ==
The 12384 (ASN – SDAH) departs Asansol Jn at 06:40 and reaches Sealdah at 10:45, while the 12383 (SDAH – ASN) departs Sealdah at 17:07 and reaches Asansol Jn at 21:10, thereby traversing a distance of 220 km in ~4 hours, with an average speed of 54 km/h (34 mph) and maximum permissible speed of 110 km/h (81 mph). The train runs daily except Sunday.

== Route and Halts ==
Enroute, the train halts at:

- Barrackpore
- Naihati Jn
- Bandel Jn
- Barddhaman Jn
- Panagarh
- Durgapur
- Andal Jn
- Raniganj

== Traction ==
The train is hauled by an Asansol-based WAP-4 or a Sealdah-based WAP-7 or WAG-9 throughout its journey.
