= Kolkata–Agra Cantonment Express =

Kolkata Agra Cantonment Express
Overview
- Service type: Express
- First service: 9 February 2014
- Current operator: Eastern Railways

Route
- Termini: Kolkata Chitpur; Agra Cantonment
- Stops: 20
- Distance travelled: 1,460.5 km (908 mi)
- Average journey time: 27 hours 30 mins as 13167 Kolkata–Agra Cantonment Express, 27 hours 45 mins as 13168 Agra Cantonment–Kolkata Express.
- Service frequency: Once a week. 13167 Kolkata–Agra Cantonment Express – Thursday. 13168 Agra Cantonment–Kolkata Express – Saturday.
- Train number: 13167 / 68

On-board services
- Classes: AC 2 tier, AC 3 tier, AC Economy, Sleeper class, General Unreserved
- Seating arrangements: Yes
- Sleeping arrangements: Yes
- Catering facilities: No

Technical
- Rolling stock: LHB coach
- Track gauge: 1,676 mm (5 ft 6 in)
- Electrification: Partial
- Operating speed: 110 km/h (68 mph) maximum, 53 km/h (33 mph) including halts.

The 13167 / 68 Kolkata–Agra Cantonment Express is an Express train belonging to Indian Railways – Eastern Railway zone that runs between Kolkata and Agra Cantonment in India.

It operates as train number 13167 from Kolkata Chitpur to Agra Cantonment and as train number 13168 in the reverse direction, serving the states of West Bengal, Jharkhand, Bihar and Uttar Pradesh.

== Coaches ==
The 13167 / 68 Kolkata–Agra Cantonment Express has 1 AC 2 tier, 5 AC 3 tier, 2 AC Economy, 7 Sleeper class, 4 General Unreserved and 2 EOG (Linke Hofmann Busch Rake) coaches. It carry a pantry car .

As is customary with most train services in India, coach composition may be amended at the discretion of Indian Railways depending on demand.

== Service ==
The 13167 Kolkata–Agra Cantonment Express covers the distance of 1,460.5 km (908 mi) in 27 hours 30 mins (53 km/h) and in 27 hours 45 mins as 13168 Agra Cantonment–Kolkata Express (53 km/h) .

== Routeing ==
The 13167 / 68 Kolkata–Agra Cantonment Express runs from Kolkata Chitpur via Asansol Junction, Dhanbad Junction, Gaya Junction, Mughalsarai Junction, Varanasi Junction, Lucknow NR, Kanpur Central, Kannauj railway station, Mathura Junction to Agra Cantonment .

== Traction ==
As sections of the route are fully electrified, a Howrah-based WAP-7 hauls the locomotive from Kolkata Chitpur To Agra Cantonment

== Operation ==
13167 Kolkata–Agra Cantonment Express runs from Kolkata Chitpur every Thursday reaching Agra Cantonment on the next day .

13168 Agra Cantonment–Kolkata Express runs from Agra Cantonment every Saturday reaching Kolkata Chitpur on the next day .
