= Mithilanchal Express =

Train in India

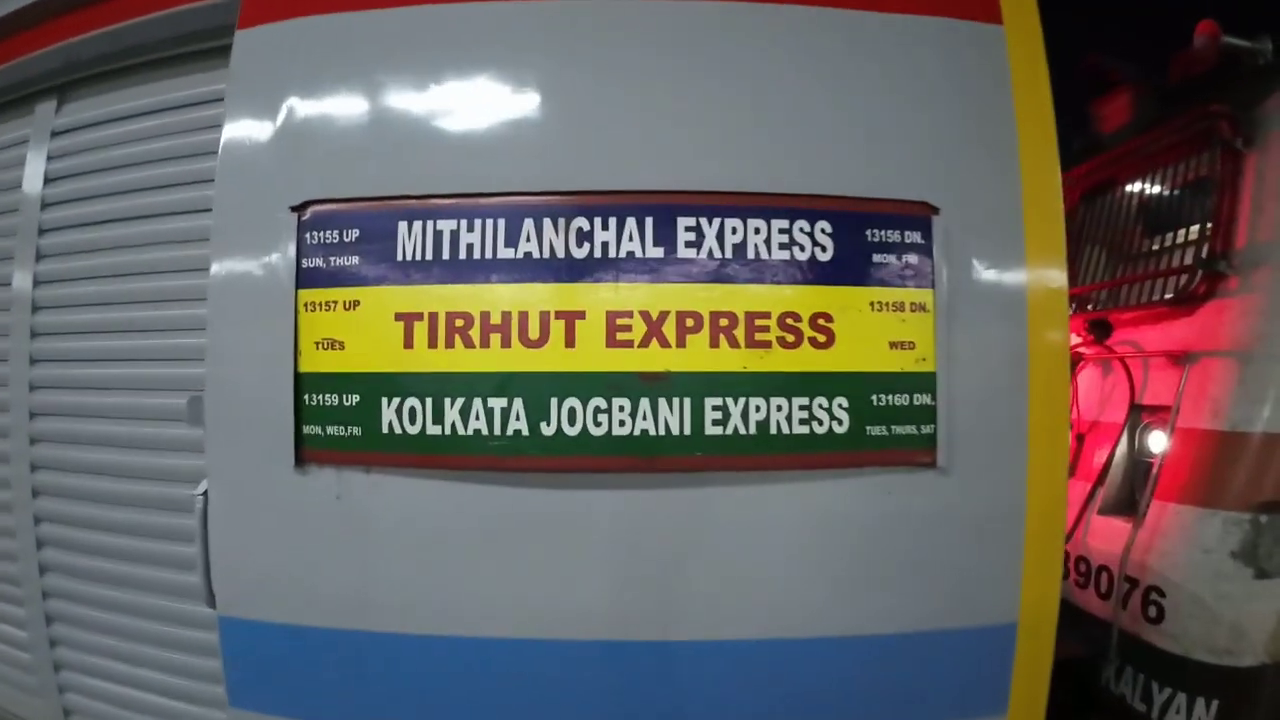

Overview
- Service type: Express
- First service: 19 February 2006; 19 years ago
- Current operator(s): Eastern Railway

Route
- Termini: Kolkata (KOAA); Sitamarhi (SMI)
- Stops: 17
- Distance travelled: 620 km (385 mi)
- Average journey time: 14 hours 15 minutes
- Service frequency: Bi-weekly (Note: Runs two days in a week for every direction.)
- Train number(s): 13155 / 13156

On-board services
- Class(es): AC 2 Tier, AC 3 Tier, Sleeper Class, General Unreserved
- Seating arrangements: No
- Sleeping arrangements: Yes
- Catering facilities: On-board catering, E-catering
- Observation facilities: Large windows
- Baggage facilities: No
- Other facilities: Below the seats

Technical
- Rolling stock: LHB coach
- Track gauge: 1,676 mm (5 ft 6 in)
- Operating speed: 44 km/h (27 mph) average including halts.

The 13155 / 13156 Mithilanchal Express is an express train belonging to Eastern Railway zone that runs between Kolkata and Sitamarhi Junction in India. It is currently being operated with 13155/13156 train numbers on twice in a week basis.

== Service ==
The 13155/Mithilanchal Express has an average speed of 44 km/h and covers 620 km in 14h 5m. The 13156/Mithilanchal Express has an average speed of 41 km/h and covers 620 km in 14h 50m.

== Route and halts ==
The important halts of the train are:

- Kolkata
- Naihati Junction
- Barddhaman Junction
- Durgapur
- Asansol Junction
- Chittaranjan
- Madhupur Junction
- Jasidih Junction
- Jhajha
- Kiul Junction
- Lakhisarai Junction
- Barauni Junction
- Samastipur Junction
- Laheriasarai
- Darbhanga Junction
- Janakpur Road
- Sitamarhi Junction

== Coach composition ==
The train has standard LHB rakes with max speed of 130 kmph. The train consists of 22 coaches:

Loco	1	2	3	4	5	6	7	8	9	10	11	12	13	14	15	16	17	18	19	20	21	22
	SLR	GN	GN	S1	S2	S3	S4	S5	S6	S7	S8	S9	S10	B1	B2	B3	B4	B5	A1	GN	GN	EOG

== Traction ==
Both trains are hauled by a Howrah Loco Shed-based WAP-4 or Samastipur Loco Shed-based WAP-7 electric locomotive from Sitamarhi to Kolkata and vice versa.

== Rake sharing ==
The trains shares its rake with

- 13157/13158 Tirhut Express
- 13159/13160 Kolkata–Jogbani Express
- 13165/13166 Kolkata–Sitamarhi Express

== See also ==
- Kolkata railway station
- Sitamarhi Junction railway station
- Kolkata–Sitamarhi Express
- Mithila Express
