= Kolkata–Azamgarh Weekly Express =

Train in India

Overview
- Service type: Express
- First service: 11 February 2013; 12 years ago
- Current operator: Eastern Railway

Route
- Termini: Kolkata (KOAA); Azamgarh (AMH)
- Stops: 20
- Distance travelled: 789 km (490 mi)
- Average journey time: 18h 40m
- Service frequency: Weekly
- Train number: 13137/13138

On-board services
- Classes: AC 2 Tier, AC 3 Tier, Sleeper 3 Tier, General Unreserved
- Seating arrangements: No
- Sleeping arrangements: Yes
- Catering facilities: E-catering
- Entertainment facilities: Rake sharing with 12325/12326 Gurumukhi Superfast Express
- Baggage facilities: Available

Technical
- Rolling stock: LHB coach
- Track gauge: 1,676 mm (5 ft 6 in)
- Operating speed: 43 km/h (27 mph) average including halts

Kolkata–Azamgarh Weekly Express is an Express train of the Indian Railways connecting Kolkata in West Bengal and Azamgarh in Uttar Pradesh. It is currently being operated with 13137/13138 train numbers on once in week basis.

== Service ==
The 13137/Kolkata–Azamgarh Weekly Express has an average speed of 42 km/h and covers 789 km in 18 hrs 45 mins. 13138/Azamgarh–Kolkata Weekly Express has an average speed of 40 km/h and covers 789 km in 19 hrs 45 mins.

== Route & Halts ==
The important halts of the train are :

- Kolkata
- Barrackpore
- Naihati
- Bandel
- Bardhaman
- Asansol
- Madhupur
- Jasidih
- Jhajha
- Kiul
- Barauni Junction
- Hajipur
- Chhapra Junction
- Ballia
- Mau Junction
- Azamgarh

== Traction ==
As the route is partially electrified, it is hauled by a Howrah Loco Shed-based WAP-4 locomotive from Kolkata up to Barauni Junction handing over to a Samastipur Diesel Loco Shed-based WDM-3A locomotive power the train for the remainder of the journey until Azamgarh.

== Rake sharing & Maintenance ==
The train is maintained by the Kolkata Coaching Depot. The same rake is used for 13325/13326 Gurumukhi Superfast Express for one way which is altered by the second rake on the other way.

== Coach composition ==
The train consists of 15 coaches:

- 1 AC II Tier
- 2 AC III Tier
- 2 AC Economy
- 6 Sleeper coaches
- 2 General
- 1 Second-class Luggage/parcel van
