= Purvanchal Express =

Train in India

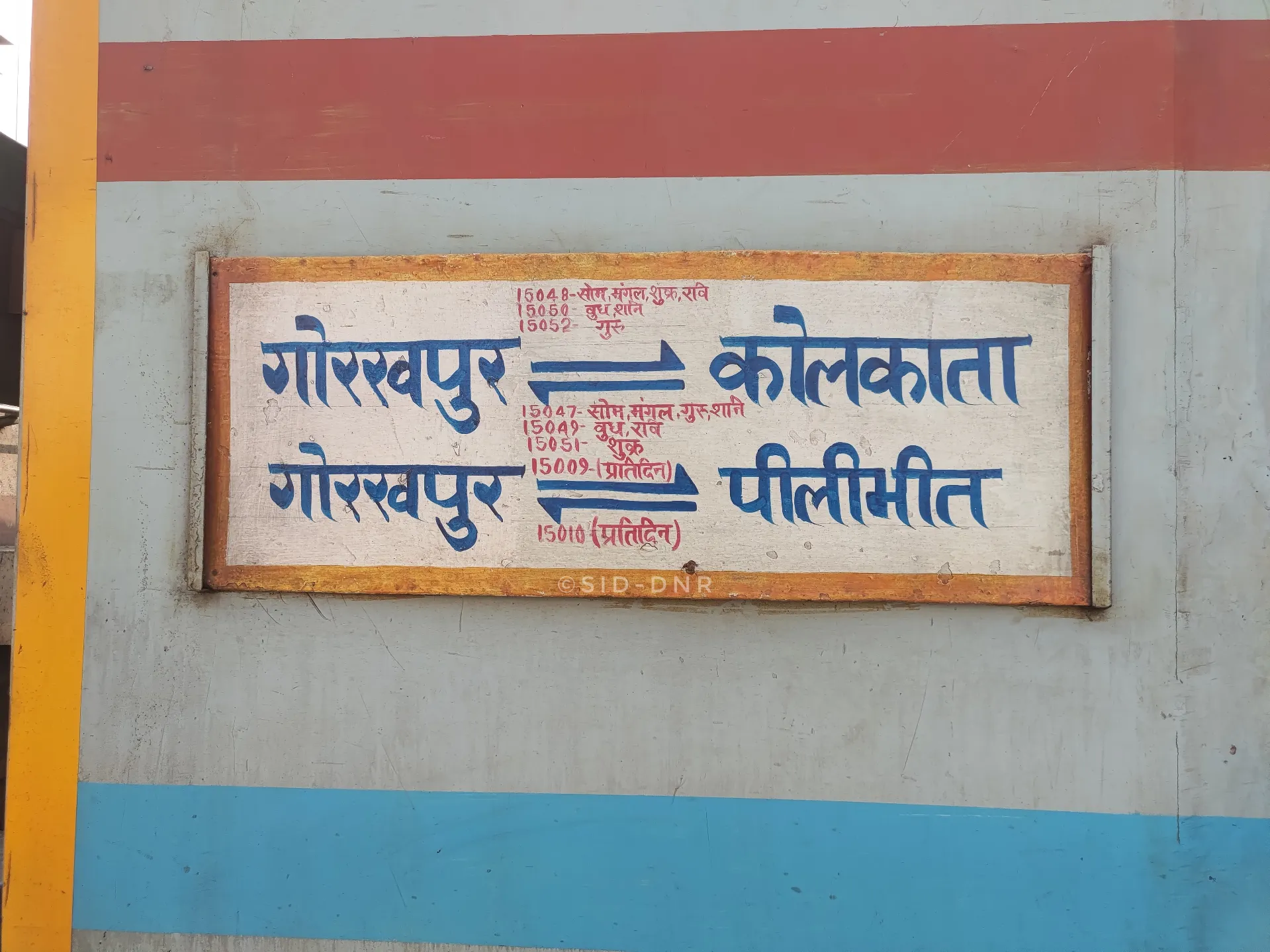

Overview
- Service type: Express
- Locale: West Bengal, Jharkhand, Bihar & Uttar Pradesh
- First service: 3 October 1987; 38 years ago
- Current operator: North Eastern Railway

Route
- Termini: Kolkata (KOAA); Gorakhpur (GKP)
- Distance travelled: 860-883 km
- Average journey time: 17-20 hrs approx.
- Service frequency: 4 Days a week as 15047/15048, Bi-weekly as 15049/15050, Weekly as 15051/15052
- Train numbers: 15047 / 15048, 15049 / 15050, 15051 / 15052

On-board services
- Classes: AC 2 Tier, AC 3 Tier, Sleeper Class, General Unreserved
- Seating arrangements: Yes
- Sleeping arrangements: Yes
- Catering facilities: Available
- Observation facilities: Large windows
- Baggage facilities: Available
- Other facilities: Below the seats

Technical
- Rolling stock: LHB coach
- Track gauge: 1,676 mm (5 ft 6 in)
- Operating speed: 50 km/h (31 mph) average including halts.

The Purvanchal Express is an express train of Indian Railways that runs between Kolkata in West Bengal and Gorakhpur in Uttar Pradesh. It is operated by the North Eastern Railway zone and connects major towns and cities in Bihar and eastern Uttar Pradesh. The train operates under three sets of train numbers: 15047/15048, 15049/15050, and 15051/15052, each following a different route.

== Overview ==
The Purvanchal Express was introduced by Indian Railways to provide direct rail connectivity between Kolkata and Gorakhpur, catering to passengers from eastern Uttar Pradesh and Bihar. Over time, the service was expanded into three pairs of trains: 15047/15048, 15049/15050, and 15051/15052 each operating via different routes to serve a wider geographical area. The introduction of multiple routings improved accessibility to important stations such as Chhapra, Siwan, Muzaffarpur, Narkatiaganj, Hajipur, Samastipur, and Barauni.

== 15047/15048 via Siwan ==
This service of the Purvanchal Express, running with train numbers 15047/15048, operates between Kolkata and Gorakhpur via Siwan, Chhapra, Muzaffarpur and Barauni. The train passes through major stations in Bihar and eastern Uttar Pradesh and provides direct rail connectivity between these regions.

=== Schedule ===
15047 / 15048 Kolkata–Gorakhpur Purvanchal Express Schedule
Train Type	Mail / Express
Distance	856 km
Average Speed	~50 km/h
Journey Time (KOAA → GKP)	~17 hrs 20 min
Journey Time (GKP → KOAA)	~16 hrs 30 min
Classes Available	1A, 2A, 3A, SL, GEN
Operating Days	Mon, Tue, Fri & Sun
Operator	Eastern Railway

=== Route & Halts ===
15047 & 15048 Purvanchal Express
15047 KOAA → GKP				15048 GKP → KOAA			
Station	Arr.	Dep.	Dist (km)	Station	Arr.	Dep.	Dist (km)
Kolkata Terminal	—	14:35	0	Gorakhpur Junction	—	11:10	0
Naihati Junction	15:18	15:20	34	Deoria Sadar	12:10	12:15	50
Bandel	15:45	15:47	43	Siwan Junction	13:15	13:20	120
Bardhaman	16:47	16:49	111	Chhapra	14:35	14:45	180
Panagarh	17:22	17:23	158	Sonpur Junction	15:41	15:43	234
Durgapur	17:33	17:35	173	Hajipur Junction	15:55	16:00	240
Asansol Junction	18:00	18:10	215	Muzaffarpur Junction	16:40	16:45	293
Chittaranjan	18:32	18:34	240	Samastipur Junction	17:50	17:55	345
Madhupur Junction	19:10	19:13	296	Barauni Junction	19:20	19:30	396
Jasidih Junction	19:34	19:38	325	Jhajha	21:35	21:40	487
Jhajha	20:55	21:00	369	Jasidih Junction	22:10	22:15	531
Barauni Junction	23:15	23:25	460	Madhupur Junction	22:36	22:39	560
Samastipur Junction	00:10	00:15	511	Chittaranjan	23:22	23:24	617
Muzaffarpur Junction	01:25	01:30	563	Asansol Junction	00:01	00:11	641
Hajipur Junction	02:20	02:25	617	Durgapur	00:40	00:42	684
Sonpur Junction	02:33	02:35	622	Panagarh	00:54	00:55	699
Chhapra	04:15	04:25	676	Bardhaman	01:35	01:37	746
Siwan Junction	05:15	05:20	737	Bandel	02:25	02:27	813
Deoria Sadar	06:15	06:20	806	Naihati Junction	03:00	03:02	823
Gorakhpur Junction	07:55	—	856	Kolkata Terminal	04:40	—	856

=== Coach Composition ===
Category	Coaches	Total
Luggage/Parcel Rake (LPR)	LPR1, LPR2	2
General Unreserved (GEN)	GEN1, GEN2, GEN3, GEN4	4
AC 2 Tier (2A)	A1, A2	2
AC First Class (1A)	H1	1
AC 3 Tier (3A)	B1, B2, B3, B4, B5, B6, B7, B8, B9	9
Sleeper Class (SL)	S1, S2, S3, S4	4
Sleeper cum Luggage Rake (SLRD) (Divyangjan)	SLRD	1
Power Car (VP)	VP	1
Total Coaches		23

- Primary Maintenance – Kolkata CD

== 15049/15050 via Mau ==
This service of the Purvanchal Express, running with train numbers 15049/15050, operates between Kolkata and Gorakhpur via Mau, Siwan, Hajipur, Samastipur and Barauni.

=== Schedule ===
15049 / 15050 Kolkata–Gorakhpur Purvanchal Express Schedule
Train Type	Mail / Express
Distance	856 km
Average Speed	~50 km/h
Journey Time (KOAA → GKP)	~18 hrs
Journey Time (GKP → KOAA)	~16 hrs
Classes Available	1A, 2A, 3A, SL, GEN
Operating Days	Wedenesday & Saturday
Operator	Eastern Railway

=== Route & Halts ===
15049 / 15050 Purvanchal Express
15049 KOAA → GKP				15050 GKP → KOAA			
Station	Arr.	Dep.	Dist (km)	Station	Arr.	Dep.	Dist (km)
Kolkata Terminal	—	14:35	0	Gorakhpur Junction	—	08:35	0
Naihati Junction	15:18	15:20	34	Deoria Sadar	09:33	09:38	50
Bandel	15:45	15:47	43	Bhatni Junction	10:00	10:05	71
Bardhaman	16:47	16:49	111	Salempur Junction	10:18	10:20	81
Durgapur	17:33	17:35	173	Belthara Road	10:38	10:40	104
Asansol Junction	18:00	18:10	215	Mau Junction	11:25	11:55	139
Chittaranjan	18:32	18:34	240	Indara Junction	12:05	12:07	147
Madhupur Junction	19:10	19:13	296	Rasra	12:30	12:32	175
Jasidih Junction	19:34	19:38	325	Ballia	13:10	13:15	208
Jhajha	20:55	21:00	369	Suraimanpur	13:58	14:00	245
Barauni Junction	23:15	23:25	460	Chhapra	14:45	15:00	273
Mohiuddinnagar	00:01	00:03	497	Hajipur Junction	16:20	16:25	332
Shahpur Patoree	00:15	00:17	510	Desari	16:58	17:00	352
Desari	00:32	00:34	528	Shahpur Patoree	17:28	17:30	370
Hajipur Junction	01:05	01:10	548	Mohiuddinnagar	17:53	17:55	383
Chhapra	02:40	02:50	607	Barauni Junction	19:20	19:30	420
Suraimanpur	03:22	03:24	636	Jhajha	21:35	21:40	511
Ballia	03:53	03:58	672	Jasidih Junction	22:10	22:15	555
Rasra	04:25	04:27	705	Madhupur Junction	22:36	22:39	584
Indara Junction	04:49	04:51	733	Chittaranjan	23:22	23:24	640
Mau Junction	05:10	05:40	741	Asansol Junction	00:01	00:11	665
Belthara Road	06:15	06:17	777	Durgapur	00:40	00:42	707
Salempur Junction	06:40	06:42	799	Bardhaman	01:35	01:37	770
Bhatni Junction	07:00	07:05	809	Bandel	02:25	02:27	837
Deoria Sadar	07:25	07:30	830	Naihati Junction	03:00	03:02	847
Gorakhpur Junction	09:25	—	880	Kolkata Terminal	04:40	—	880

=== Coach Composition ===
Category	Coaches	Total
Luggage/Parcel Rake (LPR)	LPR1, LPR2	2
General Unreserved (GEN)	GEN1, GEN2, GEN3, GEN4	4
AC 2 Tier (2A)	A1, A2	2
AC First Class (1A)	H1	1
AC 3 Tier (3A)	B1, B2, B3, B4, B5, B6, B7, B8, B9	9
Sleeper Class (SL)	S1, S2, S3, S4	4
Sleeper cum Luggage Rake (SLRD) (Divyangjan)	SLRD	1
Power Car (VP)	VP	1
Total Coaches		23

== 15051/15052 via Narkatiaganj ==
This service of the Purvanchal Express, running with train numbers 15051/15052, operates between Kolkata and Gorakhpur via Narkatiaganj, Muzaffarpur and Barauni. The train provides a direct link for passengers.

=== Schedule ===
15051 / 15052 Kolkata–Gorakhpur Purvanchal Express Schedule
Train Type	Mail / Express
Distance	873 km
Average Speed	~50 km/h
Journey Time (KOAA → GKP)	~17 hrs 40 min
Journey Time (GKP → KOAA)	~17 hrs 25 min
Classes Available	1A, 2A, 3A, SL, GEN
Operating Days	Thurshday Only
Operator	Eastern Railway

=== Route & Halts ===
15051 & 15052 Purvanchal Express
15051 KOAA → GKP				15052 GKP → KOAA			
Station	Arr.	Dep.	Dist (km)	Station	Arr.	Dep.	Dist (km)
Kolkata Terminal	—	14:35	0	Gorakhpur Junction	—	10:05	0
Naihati Junction	15:18	15:20	34	Pipraich	10:38	10:40	20
Bandel	15:45	15:47	43	Kaptanganj Junction	11:00	11:05	40
Bardhaman	16:47	16:49	111	Siswa Bazar	11:23	11:25	66
Durgapur	17:33	17:35	173	Bagaha	12:37	12:39	109
Asansol Junction	18:00	18:10	215	Narkatiaganj Junction	13:25	13:30	151
Chittaranjan	18:32	18:34	240	Bettiah	14:03	14:05	187
Madhupur Junction	19:10	19:13	296	Sagauli Junction	14:25	14:27	209
Jasidih Junction	19:34	19:38	325	Bapudm Motihari	14:43	14:45	231
Jhajha	20:55	21:00	369	Chakia	15:28	15:30	262
Barauni Junction	23:15	23:25	460	Mehsi	15:38	15:40	270
Samastipur Junction	00:20	00:25	511	Muzaffarpur Junction	16:55	17:00	310
Muzaffarpur Junction	01:15	01:20	563	Samastipur Junction	18:10	18:15	362
Mehsi	02:10	02:12	602	Barauni Junction	19:20	19:30	413
Chakia	02:24	02:26	611	Jhajha	21:35	21:40	503
Bapudm Motihari	02:50	02:53	642	Jasidih Junction	22:10	22:15	547
Sagauli Junction	03:22	03:24	664	Madhupur Junction	22:36	22:39	577
Bettiah	03:45	03:47	686	Chittaranjan	23:22	23:24	633
Narkatiaganj Junction	04:27	04:32	722	Asansol Junction	00:01	00:11	658
Bagaha	05:14	05:17	764	Durgapur	00:40	00:42	700
Siswa Bazar	06:32	06:34	807	Bardhaman	01:35	01:37	762
Kaptanganj Junction	07:00	07:05	833	Bandel	02:25	02:27	830
Gorakhpur Junction	08:15	—	873	Naihati Junction	03:00	03:02	839
Kolkata Terminal	—	—	873				

== Traction ==
As the route is fully electrified, all 3 sets of the train are hauled by a Gonda Loco Shed or Gorakhpur Loco Shed-based WAP-7 electric locomotive on its entire journey.

== Coach composition ==
Category	Coaches	Total
Luggage/Parcel Rake (LPR)	LPR1, LPR2	2
General Unreserved (GEN)	GEN1, GEN2, GEN3, GEN4	4
AC 2 Tier (2A)	A1, A2	2
AC First Class (1A)	H1	1
AC 3 Tier (3A)	B1, B2, B3, B4, B5, B6, B7, B8, B9	9
Sleeper Class (SL)	S1, S2, S3, S4	4
Sleeper cum Luggage Rake (SLRD) (Divyangjan)	SLRD	1
Power Car (VP)	VP	1
Total Coaches		23
