= Palta, North 24 Parganas =

Palta
- Neighbourhood
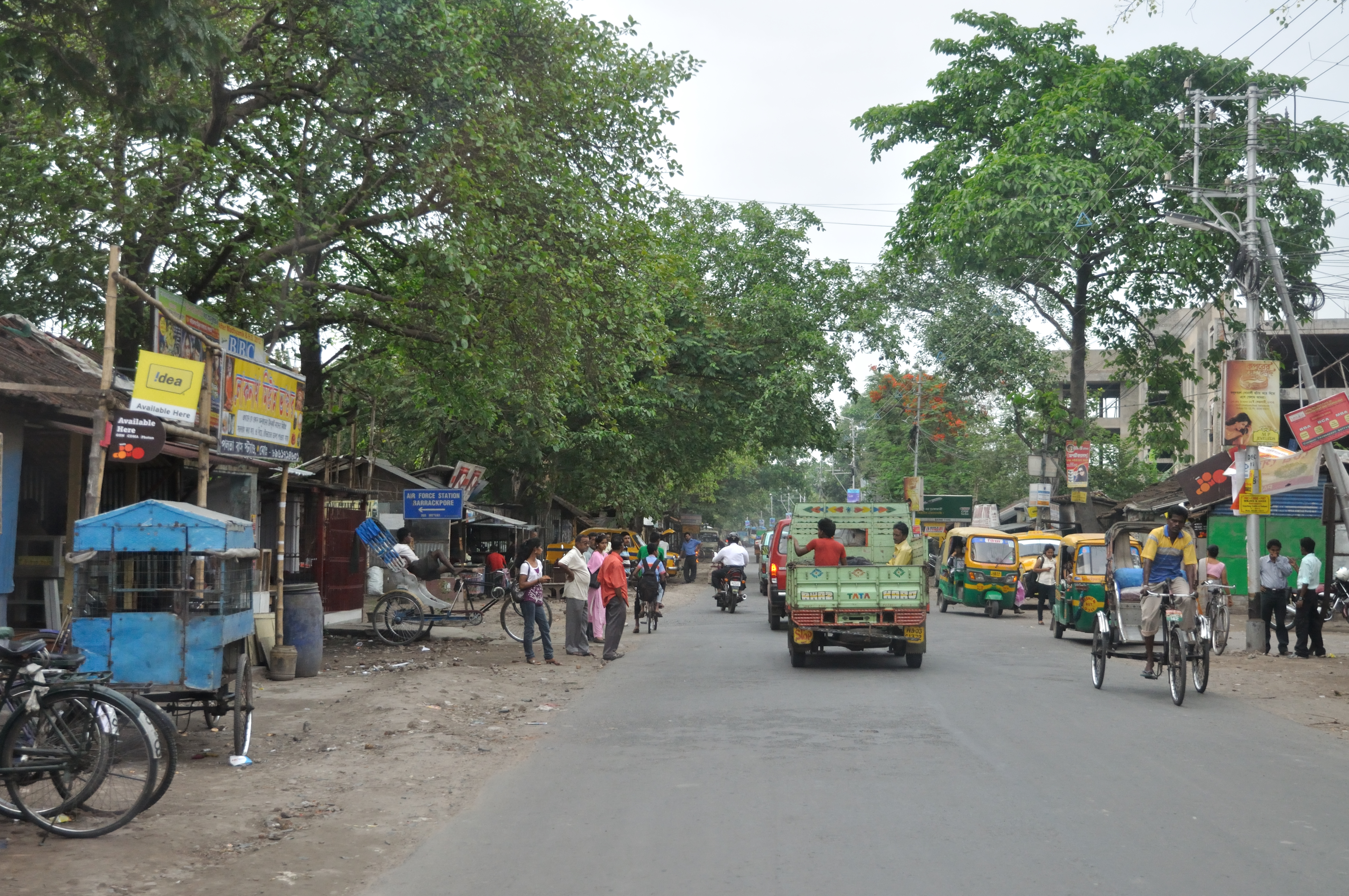
- Palta bus stand on Ghoshpara Road

- Location in West Bengal, India Palta (India)
- Coordinates: 22.7847°N 88.36491°E
- Country: India
- State: West Bengal
- Division: Presidency
- District: North 24 Parganas

Government
  - Type: Municipality
  - Body: North Barrackpur Municipality

Languages
  - Official: Bengali, English
- Time zone: UTC+5:30 (IST)
- PIN: 743122
- Telephone code: +91 33
- Vehicle registration: WB
- Lok Sabha constituency: Barrackpore
- Vidhan Sabha constituency: Noapara
- Website: north24parganas.nic.in

Palta is a neighbourhood in North Barrackpur of North 24 Parganas district in the Indian state of West Bengal. It is a part of the area covered by Kolkata Metropolitan Development Authority (KMDA).

== Geography ==
=== Post Office ===
Bengal Enamel Post Office at Palta is a delivery sub post office, with PIN 743122 in the North Presidency Division of North 24 Parganas district in Calcutta region. No other post office has the same PIN.

== Economy ==
=== Indira Gandhi Water Works ===
Palta Water Works, rechristened Indira Gandhi Water Treatment Plant, was the first intake point of water for Kolkata, established in 1864-1870 and spread over 480 acres. It was expanded in 1888–1893, 1905, 1920, 1936, 1952 and 1968. The total daily potable water supply is 1,350 million litres or 96 million gallons. It feeds 212,000 domestic connections plus commercial connections in Kolkata. The distance between Indira Gandhi Water Treatment Plant and the pumping station at Tala is 22 km.

=== Industry ===
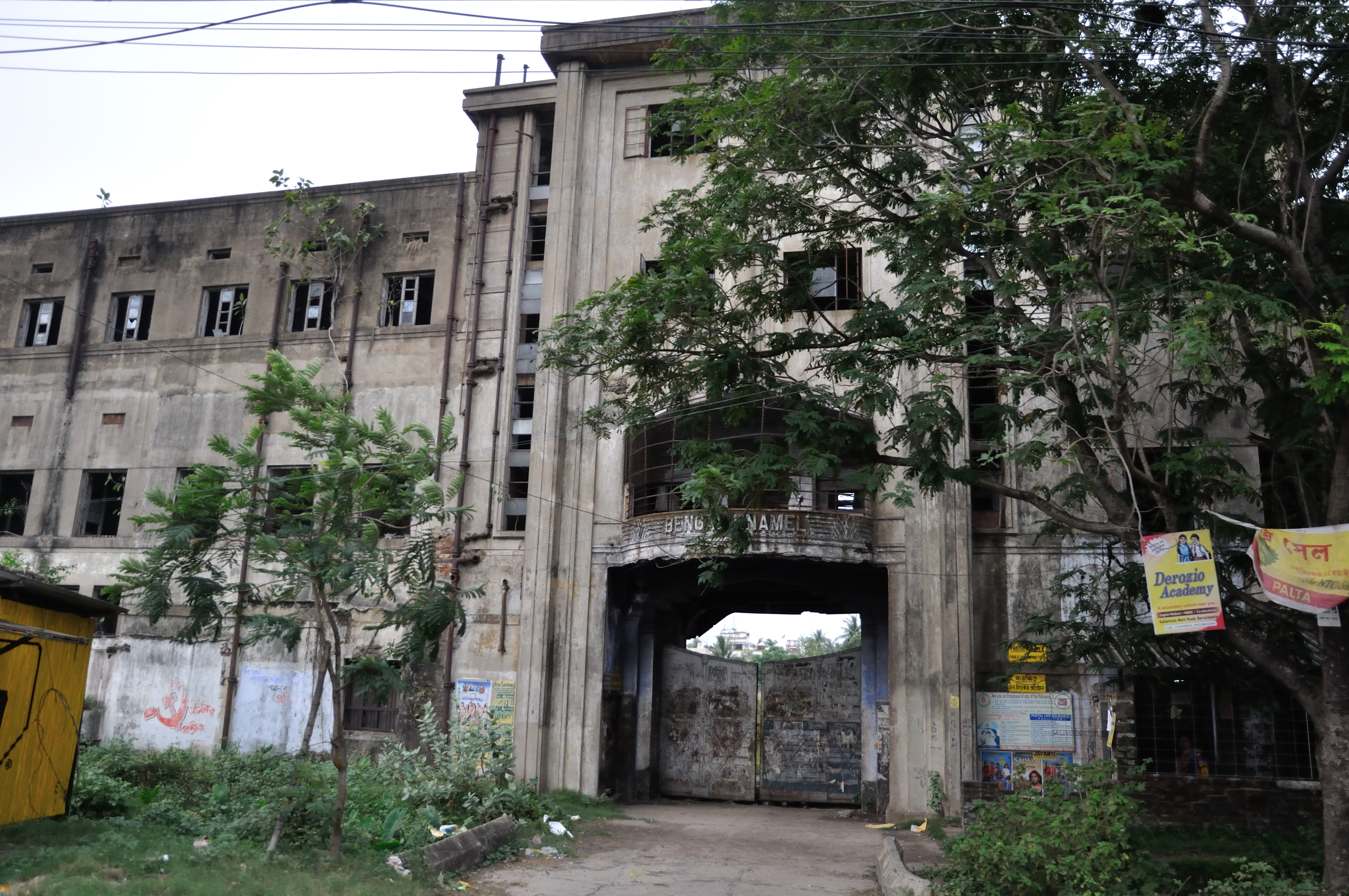
The old Bengal Enamel Works Limited factory

The Bengal Enamel Works Ltd, established in 1921, closed down by 2004 and the land is now used by housing promoters. The modern use of vitreous enamel on metals was introduced to India only during the early 20th century, when a young engineer, Debendra Nath Bhattacharya sailed to Japan and worked as an apprentice in a Japanese enamel factory. On returning to India, he started a factory in 1921, called Bengal Enamel Works Limited, with his elder brother Dwijendra Nath Bhattacharjee as the financier, and himself as the chief technician. Other enamel factories started up within a few years, but Bengal Enamel kept growing and maintained a monopolistic control of the market up until the late '80s. Just before the 2nd world war, a Jewish engineer from Germany, Adams, took up employment with Bengal Enamel and greatly improved its technology. They began supplying enamelled mugs, water bottles and dinner plates to the Indian army, and later on, to many middle eastern armies.

Control of Bengal Enamel was handed over from Dwijendra Nath Bhattacharya to his son-in-law, Dr. Umapati Ganguli, who greatly expanded the company from domestic enamelware (plates, mugs, glasses, bowls, spoons, etc.) and water bottles for the army, to domestic and industrial sign boards, glass lined chemical reaction equipment and enamelled outdoor furniture. in 1962, when the Standard Vacuum Oil Company changed its name to ESSO, Bengal Enamel provided the sign boards for the entire South East Asian region. Up to 1980, Bengal Enamel controlled more than 50% of the Indian enamel market, and when it went into liquidation, in 2004, 10 years after the death of Dr. Umapati Ganguli, the entire domestic enamelware and army supplies in India collapsed.

Today, the enamelware industry in India is mostly glass lined chemical equipment and enamelled tank and silo manufacture. Though there are several cottage scale enamellers near Calcutta, mostly run by former employees of Sur Enamel, one of the larger former enamel factories in India.

Mahaluxmi Cotton Mill is also closed and the land is used by housing promoters.

== Transport ==
Palta is on State Highway 1 (locally known as Ghoshpara Road).

Palta railway station on the Sealdah-Ranaghat line is 25 km from Sealdah Station. It is part of the Kolkata Suburban Railway system.

== Education ==
P.N. Das College was established at PO Bengal Enamel, Palta in 1962. It has around 1,700 students.
