= Tirhut Express =

Train in India

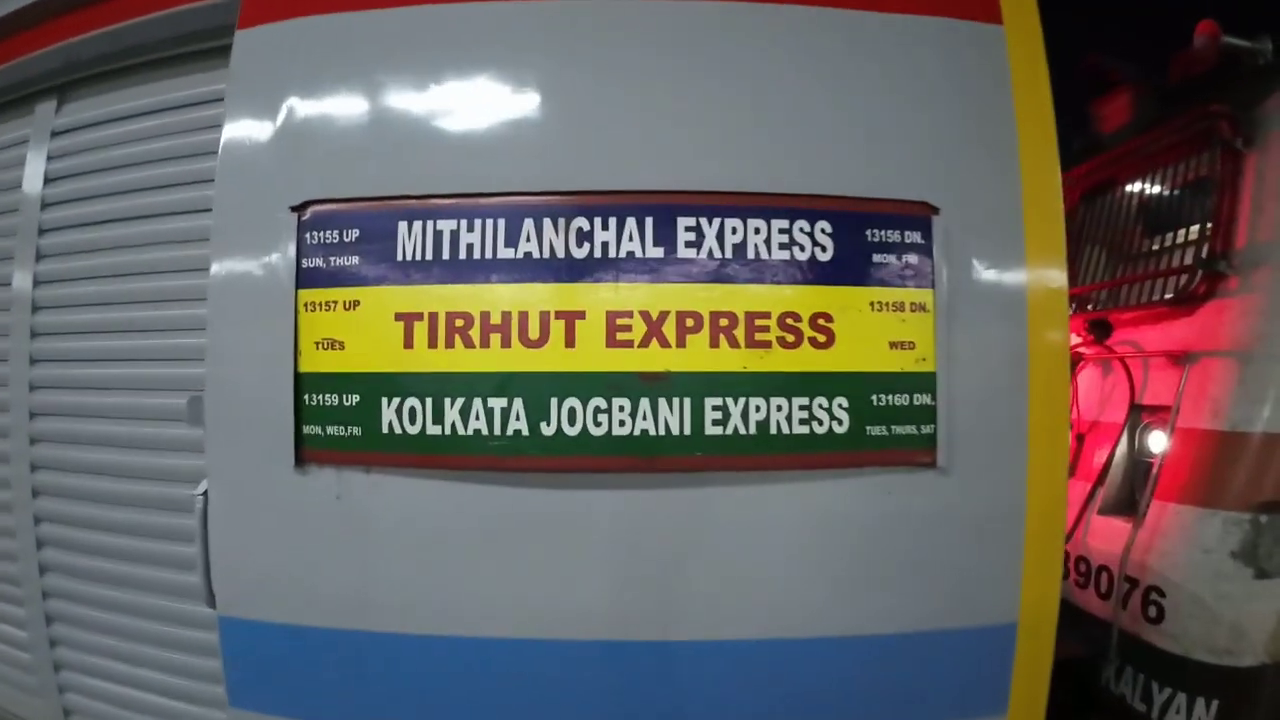

Overview
- Service type: Express
- Locale: Bihar, Jharkhand & West Bengal
- Current operator: Eastern Railway

Route
- Termini: Kolkata (KOAA); Muzaffarpur (MFP)
- Stops: 12
- Distance travelled: 566 km (352 mi)
- Average journey time: 12 hours
- Service frequency: Weekly
- Train number: 13157 / 13158

On-board services
- Classes: AC 2 Tier, AC 3 Tier, Sleeper Class, General Unreserved
- Seating arrangements: Yes
- Sleeping arrangements: Yes
- Catering facilities: On-board catering, E-catering
- Observation facilities: Large windows
- Baggage facilities: Available
- Other facilities: Below the seats

Technical
- Rolling stock: LHB coach
- Track gauge: 1,676 mm (5 ft 6 in)
- Operating speed: 47 km/h (29 mph) average including halts
Route map
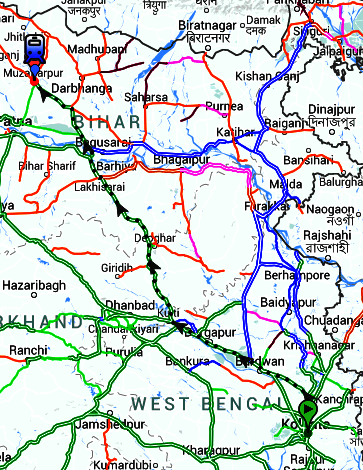

The 13157 / 13158 Tirhut Express is an express train belonging to Indian Railways – Eastern Railway zone that runs between Kolkata Station and Muzaffarpur Junction in India.

It operates as train number 13157 from Kolkata station to Muzaffarpur Junction and as train number 13158 in the reverse direction, serving the states of Bihar, Jharkhand and West Bengal.

== Schedule ==
13157 / 13158 Kolkata–Muzaffarpur Trihut Express Schedule
Train Type	Express
Distance	~566 km (13157) / ~566 km (13158)
Average Speed	~42 km/h
Journey Time (KOAA → MFP)	~12 hrs 10 min
Journey Time (MFP → KOAA)	~12 hrs 35 min
Classes Available	1A, 2A, 3A, SL, GN
Operating Days	Daily
Operator	Eastern Railway

== Coach composition ==
Category	Coaches	Total
Seating cum Luggage Rake (SLR)	SLR	1
General Unreserved (GEN)	GN, GN, GN, GN	4
Sleeper Class (SL)	S1, S2, S3, S4, S5, S6, S7, S8, S9, S10	10
AC 3 Tier (3A)	B1, B2, B3, B4, B5	5
AC 2 Tier (2A)	A1	1
End-On Generator (EOG)	EOG	1
Total Coaches		22

- Primary Maintenance - Kolkata Coaching Depot

== Route & halts ==
13157 Kolkata–Muzaffarpur Trihut Express and 13158 Muzaffarpur–Kolkata Trihut Express Schedule
Sr.	13157 KOAA–MFP				13158 MFP–KOAA			
Sr.	Station	Day	Arr.	Dep.	Station	Day	Arr.	Dep.
1	Kolkata Terminal	1	—	20:55	Muzaffarpur Junction	1	—	14:25
2	Naihati Junction	1	21:38	21:40	Samastipur Junction	1	15:23	15:28
3	Bardhaman Junction	1	23:11	23:13	Dalsingh Sarai	1	15:51	15:53
4	Durgapur	2	00:04	00:06	Barauni Junction	1	16:40	16:50
5	Asansol Junction	2	00:55	01:00	Luckeesarai Junction	1	17:56	17:58
6	Chittaranjan	2	01:25	01:27	Jhajha	1	19:20	19:25
7	Madhupur Junction	2	02:04	02:09	Jasidih Junction	1	20:00	20:05
8	Jasidih Junction	2	02:32	02:37	Madhupur Junction	1	20:33	20:38
9	Jhajha	2	03:45	03:50	Chittaranjan	1	21:15	21:17
10	Luckeesarai Junction	2	04:26	04:28	Asansol Junction	1	21:50	21:55
11	Barauni Junction	2	06:20	06:30	Durgapur	1	22:42	22:44
12	Dalsingh Sarai	2	07:03	07:05	Bardhaman Junction	2	00:19	00:21
13	Samastipur Junction	2	07:40	07:45	Naihati Junction	2	01:53	01:55
14	Muzaffarpur Junction	2	09:05	—	Kolkata Terminal	2	03:00	—

== Traction ==
Both trains are hauled by a Howrah Loco Shed based WAP-4 electric locomotive on its entire journey.

== Rake sharing ==
The trains shares its rake with

- 13165/13166 Kolkata–Sitamarhi Express
- 13159/13160 Kolkata–Jogbani Express
- 13155/13156 Mithilanchal Express

== See also ==
- Bagh Express
- Mithila Express
- Ganga Sagar Express
