= Kolkata railway station =

Railway Station in West Bengal, India

Kolkata
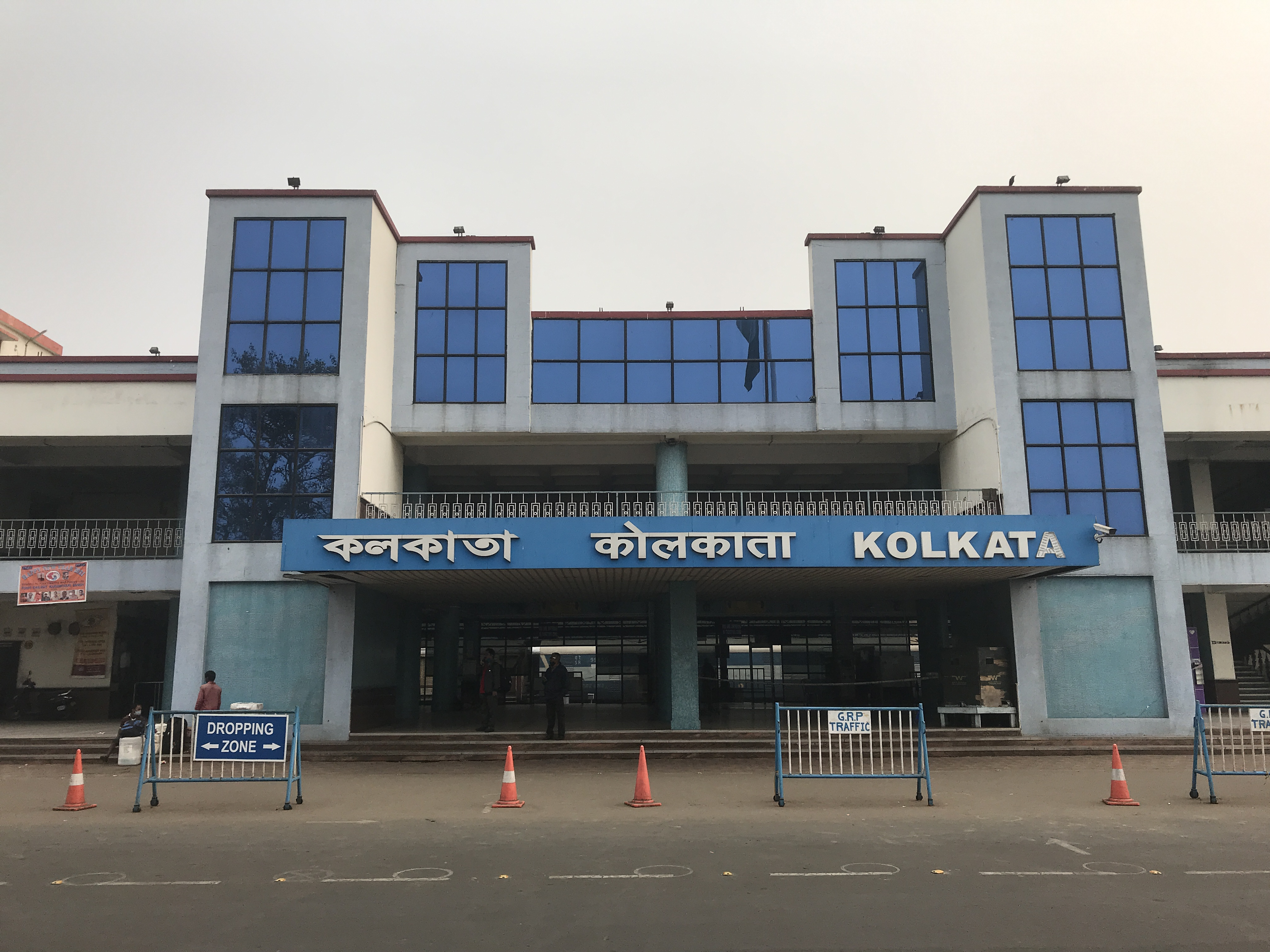
- Kolkata station

General information
- Location: Canal Circular Rd, Belgachia; Kolkata, West Bengal 700037; India
- Coordinates: 22.60127°N 88.38414°E
- Elevation: 9 metres (30 ft)
- Owner: Indian Railways
- Operator: Eastern Railway
- Line: Circular
- Platforms: 5 (1 side platform; 2 island platforms)
- Tracks: 5

Construction
- Structure type: At grade
- Parking: Available
- Cycle facilities: Available
- Accessible: Yes

Other information
- Status: Active
- Station code: KOAA
- Zone(s): Eastern Railway
- Division(s): Sealdah

History
- Opened: 2006; 20 years ago
- Rebuilt: 2014
- Former names: Chitpur Central

Passengers
- 600,000 daily

Services
Preceding station	Kolkata Suburban Railway	Following station
Patipukur towards Dum Dum Junction	Circular Line	Tala towards Dum Dum Junction
Route map
Location

Kolkata railway station (KOAA) is one of the large intercity railway stations serving Kolkata Metropolitan Area in West Bengal, India. The others are Sealdah, Howrah, Shalimar, Dankuni and Santragachi Junction. It is situated in the Belgachia locality of North Kolkata.

== History ==
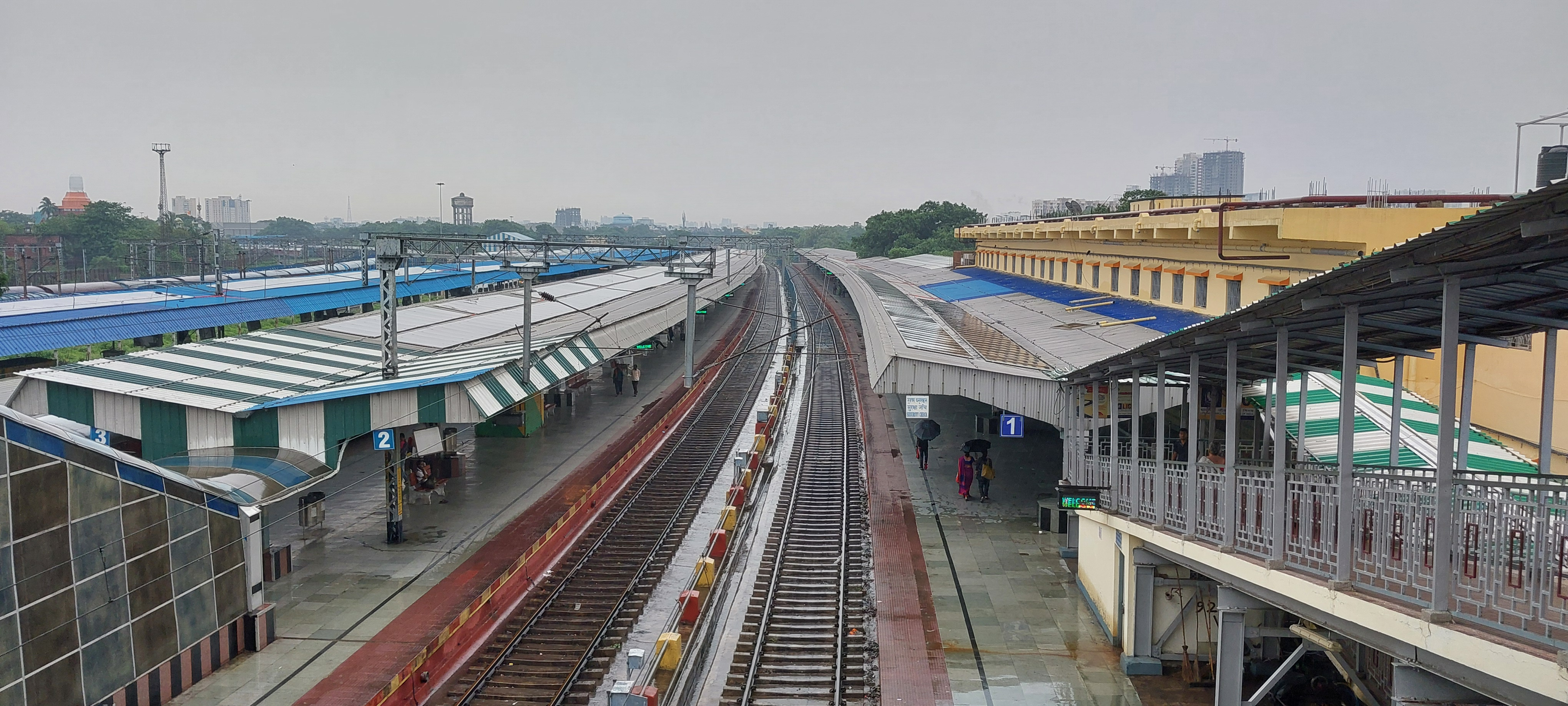
Kolkata railway station known full view

The place where the station is situated was formerly a large goods yard. The present car and bus parking areas, as well as the path to the station, formed part of a coal loading yard. The present-day platforms were once used as goods lines and formed part of the large Chitpur Rail Yard.

=== Plan & location ===
In 2000, the first plans were made to use this area as a railway station, since the rapid growth of long-distance passengers was overcrowding the Sealdah station. Due to limitations of space, new platform construction is restricted at Sealdah. Two new platforms (9A & 9B) constructed between 2004 and 2005 proved insufficient. Due to its central position in Kolkata, the Sealdah station is too busy for suburban train traffic. To overcome this problem, Eastern Railways suggested constructing another large railway station in Kolkata, to cater mostly to long-distance trains. The decision to build a terminal at Chitpur came after a lot of deliberation and a process of elimination. Different locations were suggested for the station site. Three years ago, Majerhat was suggested as a possible location. The idea was shelved owing to technical difficulties involving the construction of a bridge over the Hooghly river from Bauria to Budge Budge. Then there was Shalimar, in Howrah district, which was already a goods terminal operating under the South Eastern Railway. In fact, a passenger service on a trial basis was also started from there through two pairs of trains. But the project could not take off owing to certain problems relating to infrastructure and the considerable distance of the terminal from Kolkata proper. Chitpur was decided upon finally and approved by the Railway Ministry in 2003–04. Certain inherent advantages helped in the selection of this place. Other than being located in the heart of Kolkata, Chitpur has already functioned as an important rail yard for around a century. Moreover, unlike in the case of Majerhat and Shalimar, the huge property in and around the place belongs to the Railways. The proposal has been accepted by the Kolkata Metropolitan Development Authority (KMDA), and on 15 May 2003, West Bengal Chief Minister Buddhadeb Bhattacharjee laid the foundation stone for the project.

=== Construction history ===
Construction started in 2004. The tracks from the coal-yard were closed first, and then a large portion of electrified goods tracks were shut down. Those tracks, masts and wires were demolished. Next, the Dumdum–Majherhat link rail line's (Kolkata Circular Railway) track was temporarily re-aligned. This action permitted the construction of platforms, station buildings and a parking area to begin. After construction was completed, the circular rail tracks were aligned as before, now via the new station. Other tracks were re-aligned, and completely electrified for passenger coaches shunting (up to side of Tala station). Tracks in the opposite direction, which were not electrified and underutilised, were re-laid, re-aligned and fully electrified for goods trains (with wagon to lorry transfer facility). Part of the former electrified goods lines, which were closed, now entered use as a coach siding.

After these, the official inauguration occurred in January 2006.

== Station layout ==
	Platform 1	Side platform
→	Track 1	22-car train
←	Track 2	22-car train
	Platform 2 / 3	Island platform
→	Track 3	22-car train
←	Track 4	22-car train
	Platform 4/5	Island Platform
→	Track 5	22-car train

== Major Trains ==
Major Trains originating from this railway station are as follows:

- Kolkata–Sairang Express (13125/13126)
- Kolkata–Silghat Town Kaziranga Express (13181/13182)
- Kolkata–Jammu Tawi Express (13151/13152)
- Kolkata - Lalgola Hazarduari Express (13113/13114)
- Kolkata - Lalgola Dhano Dhanye Express (13117/13118)
- Kolkata - Jhansi Pratham Swatrantata Sangram Express (22197/22198)
- Kolkata - Nangal Dam Gurumukhi Superfast Express (12325/12326)
- Kolkata - Amritsar Akal Takht Express (12317/12318)
- Kolkata - Amritsar Durgiana Express (12357/12358)
- Kolkata–Radhikapur Express (13145/13146)
- Kolkata–Haldibari Intercity Express (12363/12364)
- Kolkata - Darbhanga Maithili Express (15233/15234)
- Kolkata–Madar Express (19607/19608)
- Kolkata - Azamgarh Express (13137/13138)
- Kolkata - Gwalior Superfast Express (12319/12320)
- Kolkata–Agra Cantonment Express (13167/13168)
- Kolkata - Rampurhat Tebhaga Express (13161/13162)
- Kolkata–Guwahati Garib Rath Express (12517/12518)
- Kolkata–Agartala Garib Rath Express (12501/12502)
- Kolkata - Arrah Garib Rath Express (13127/13128)
- Kolkata - Udaipur City Ananya Express (12315/12316)
- Kolkata - Ahmedabad Express (19413/19414)
- Kolkata - Gorakhpur Purvanchal Express (via Mau) (15049/15050)
- Kolkata - Gorakhpur Purvanchal Express (via Narkatiaganj) (15051/15052)
- Kolkata - Gorakhpur Purvanchal Express (via Siwan) (15047/15048)
- Kolkata–Ghazipur City Weekly Express (13121/13122)
- Kolkata - Sitamarhi Mithilanchal Express (13155/13156)
- Kolkata - Muzaffarpur Tirhut Express (13157/13158)
- Kolkata–Jaynagar Weekly Express (13135/13136)
- Kolkata–Jogbani Express (13159/13160)
- Kolkata - Bikaner Pratap Superfast Express (12495/12496)
- Kolkata - Ghazipur City Shabd Bhedi Superfast Express (22323/22324)
- Kolkata–Sitamarhi Express (13165/13166)

== Services ==
The station is linked to the Sealdah–Ranaghat–Krishnanagar–Berhampore–Lalgola line and is served by the Eastern Railway for trains to Naihati, Bandel, Kalyani Simanta, Gede, Shantipur, Krishnanagar, Berhampore, Lalgola, Dankuni, Barddhaman, Katwa, Bongaon, Hasnabad and others. The number of suburban trains is lower than long-distance trains. This station runs many long-distance express trains including two pairs of Garib Rath Express, Khwaja Garib Nawaz Madar–Kolkata Express etc. and one long-distance passenger train – Lalgola Passenger. There are five platforms, among them Platform 1 & 2 is used by only suburban trains and Platform 3, 4 & 5 are used by long-distance trains. The station is operated by the Eastern Railway. The international trains of eastern India Maitree Express and Bandhan Express which runs towards Bangladesh, also departed from here.

The Maharajas' Express departed from this station for the first time at 20 March 2010. Nearest Metro Stations are Shyambazar metro station and Belgachia metro station.

== Gallery ==
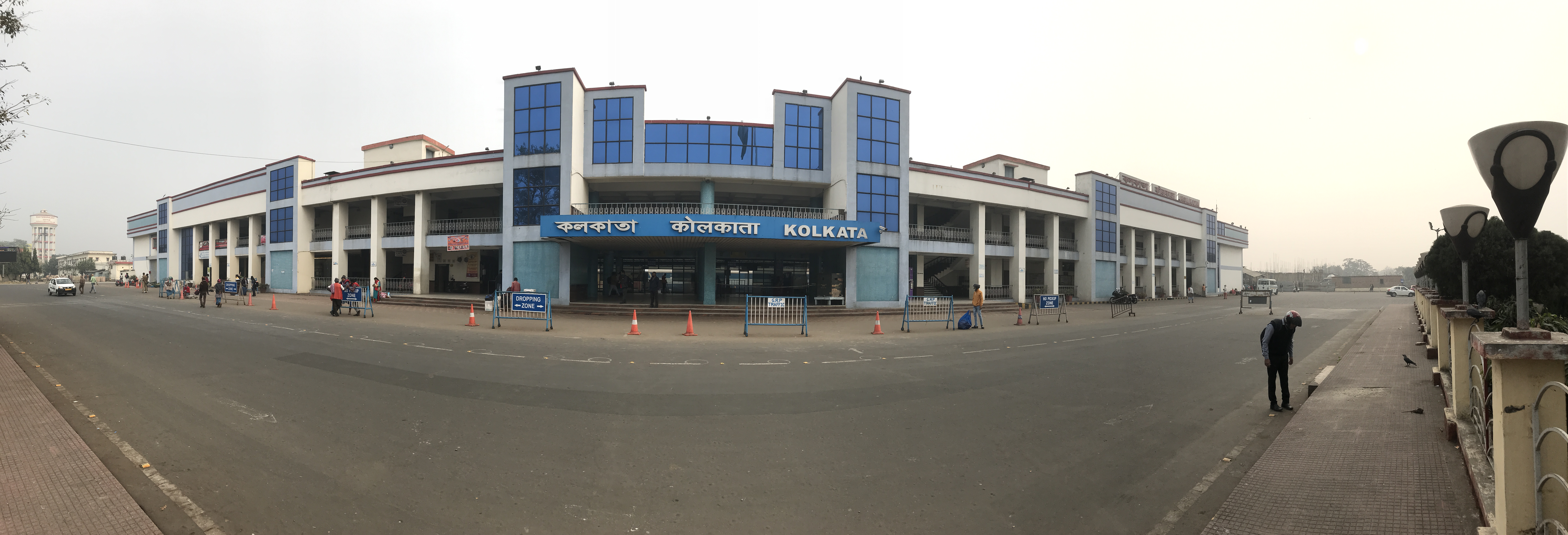
Panorama of the Kolkata Railway station

== See also ==
- Indian Railways
- Howrah station
- Shalimar station
- Santragachi Junction
- Sealdah station
- Kolkata Suburban Railway
- Kolkata Metro
- Trams in Kolkata
- Bangladesh–India relations
- Maitree Express
- Bandhan Express
