= Akal Takht Express =

Train in India

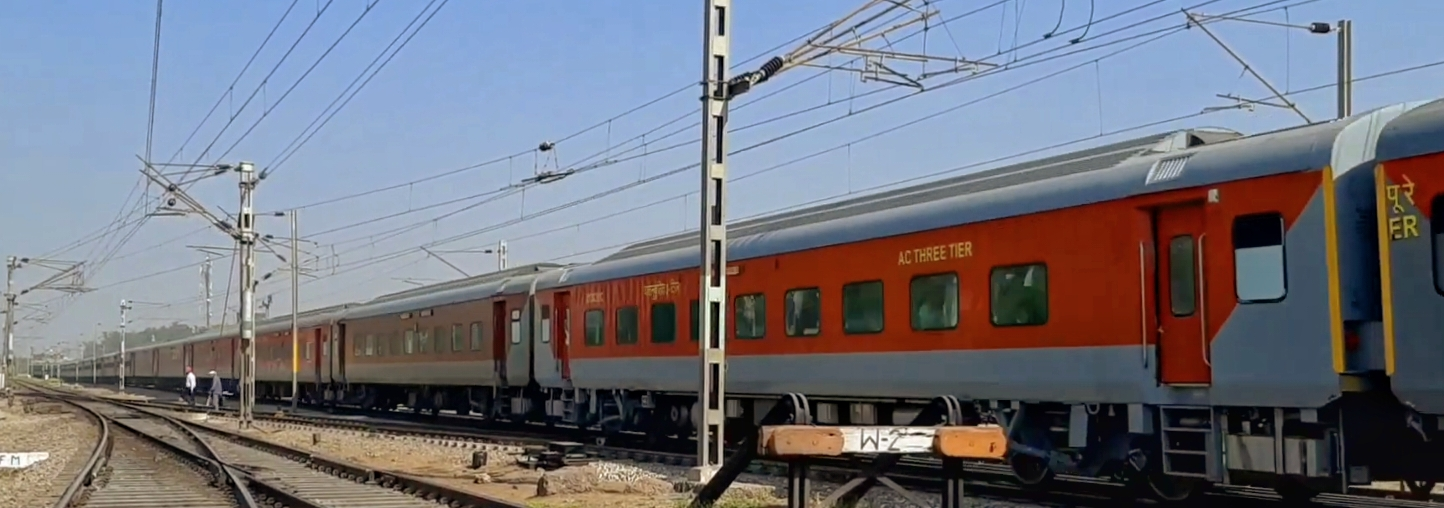
- Akal Takht Express entering Ambala Cantt.

Overview
- Service type: Superfast
- First service: 14 April 2000; 26 years ago
- Current operator: Eastern Railway

Route
- Termini: Kolkata (KOAA); Amritsar (ASR)
- Stops: 21
- Distance travelled: 1,899 km (1,180 mi)
- Average journey time: 33 hours 15 minutes (Average Time)
- Service frequency: Bi-Weekly
- Train number: 12317 / 12318

On-board services
- Classes: AC first, AC 2 tier, AC 3 tier, Sleeper class, General Unreserved
- Seating arrangements: Yes
- Sleeping arrangements: Yes
- Catering facilities: On board catering, E-catering
- Observation facilities: Rake sharing with 12315/12316 Ananya Express
- Baggage facilities: No
- Other facilities: Below the seats

Technical
- Rolling stock: LHB coach
- Track gauge: 1,676 mm (5 ft 6 in)
- Operating speed: 57 km/h (35 mph) average including halts.
Route map
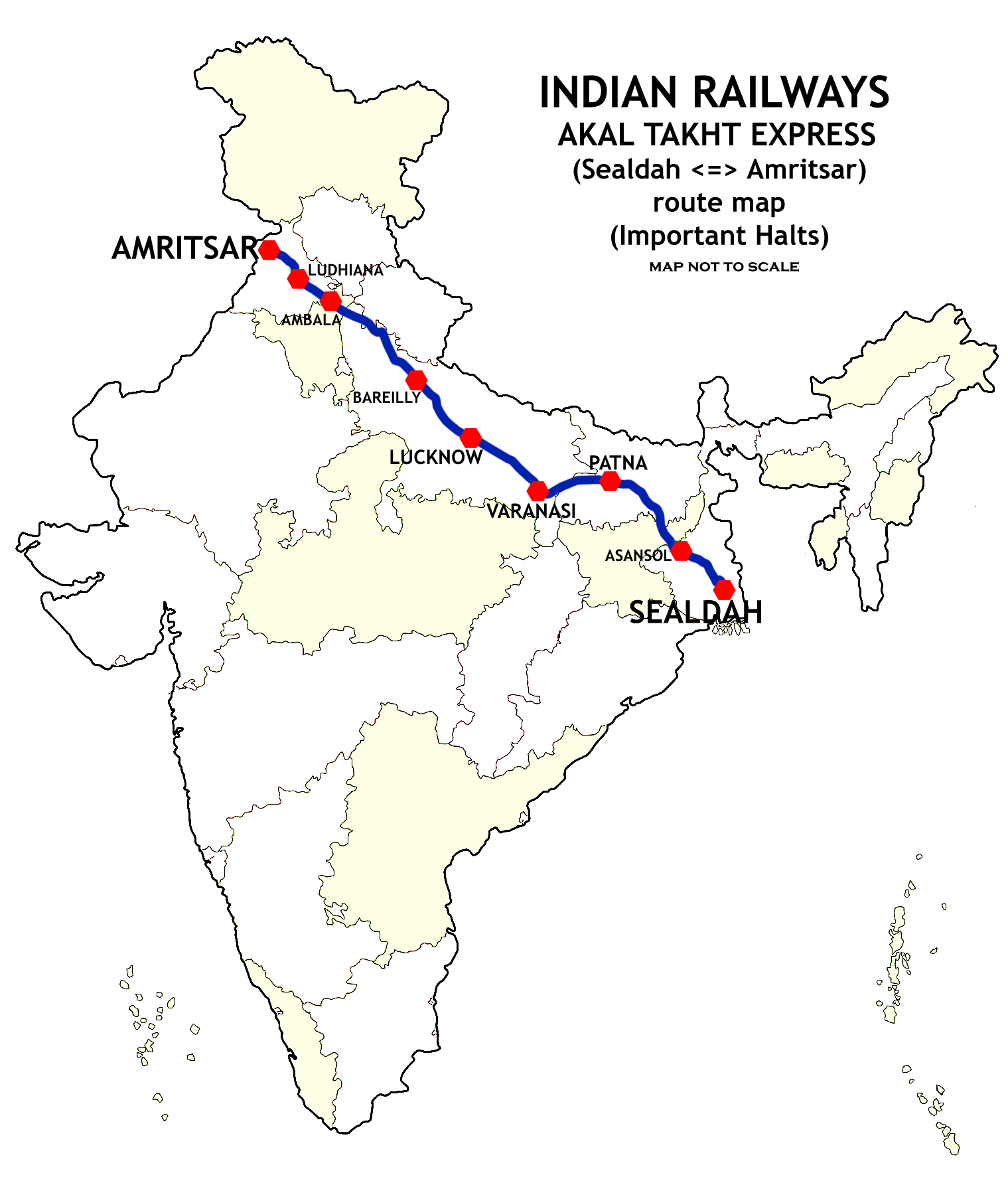

The 12317 / 12318 Akal Takht Express is an Indian Railways Express train connecting eastern Indian city of Kolkata with northern Indian city of Amritsar. It is named after the Akal Takht, a central Sikh shrine in Amritsar.

== Background ==
Originally started from Asansol as 2319/2320 Superfast in 1998, in 2000 it was extended to start from Sealdah as 2317/2318 & in 2009, 2317/2318 & 2319/2320 became same train. In 2015, its terminus got changed to Kolkata Terminus. It is a Superfast-class train travelling 1,899 kilometres (1,180 mi) in 33 hrs 40 mins at an average speed of 56 kilometres per hour (35 mph) as 12317 Akal Takht Express & in 32 hrs 50 mins at an average speed of 58 kilometres per hour (36 mph) as 12317 Akal Takht Express. It has sleeper, third AC, second AC, first AC, and unreserved types of coaches along with 2 EOG for power. for power. This train has modern LHB coach, however, pantry car facility was not available with this train until 2020. Now pantry car, on-board catering and e-catering are available.

== 12317 Route & halts ==
Station Code	Station Name	Arrival	Departure
KOAA	Kolkata Terminus	---	07:40
ASN	Asansol Junction	10:35	10:45
MDP	Madhupur Junction	12:00	12:02
JSME	Jasidh Junction	12:29	12:31
JAJ	Jhajha	13:11	13:13
KIUL	Kiul Junction	13:57	13:59
MKA	Mokama	14:28	14:30
PNC	Patna Saheb	15:17	15:22
PNBE	Patna Junction	15:55	16:05
DDU	Pt DD Upadhyaya Junction	19:35	19:45
BSB	Varanasi Junction	20:30	20:40
SLN	Sultanpur Junction	22:46	22:48
LKO	Lucknow Charbagh NR	02:43	02:53
BE	Bareilly Junction	06:13	06:15
MB	Moradabad Junction	07:50	07:58
NBD	Najibabad Junction	09:23	09:25
SRE	Saharanpur Junction	11:30	11:40
UMB	Ambala Cantt Junction	12:45	12:50
SIR	Sirhind Junction	13:31	13:33
LDH	Ludhiana Junction	14:28	14:38
JUC	Jalandhar City Junction	15:35	15:40
BEAS	Beas Junction	16:12	16:14
ASR	Amritsar Junction	17:20	---

== 12318 Route & Halts ==
Station Code	Station Name	Arrival	Departure
ASR	Amritsar Junction	---	05:55
BEAS	Beas Junction	06:32	06:34
JUC	Jalandhar City Junction	07:10	07:15
LDH	Ludhiana Junction	08:12	08:22
SIR	Sirhind Junction	09:22	09:24
UMB	Ambala Cantt Junction	10:05	10.10
SRE	Saharanpur Junction	11:30	11:40
NBD	Najibabad Junction	13:08	13:10
MB	Moradabad Junction	14:55	15:05
BE	Bareilly Junction	16:35	16:40
LKO	Lucknow Charbagh NR	20:35	20:50
SLN	Sultanpur Junction	23:05	23:10
BSB	Varanasi Junction	01:40	01:50
DDU	Pt DD Upadhyaya Junction	02:20	02:40
PNBE	Patna Junction	05:55	06:05
PNC	Patna Saheb	06:17	06:22
MKA	Mokama	07:24	07:26
KIUL	Kiul Junction	08:05	08:07
JAJ	Jhajha	08:58	09:00
JSME	Jasidh Junction	09:40	09:42
MDP	Madhupur Junction	10:10	10:12
ASN	Asansol Junction	11:33	11:43
KOAA	Kolkata Terminus	---	14:45

== Coach composition ==
The train has standard LHB rakes with max speed of 130 km/h. The train consists of 22 coaches:

- 1 AC I cum AC II Tier
- 1 AC II Tier
- 6 AC III Tier
- 10 Sleeper coaches
- 2 General
- 2 EOG

Loco	1	2	3	4	5	6	7	8	9	10	11	12	13	14	15	16	17	18	19	20	21	22	EOG	GEN	GEN	S1	S2	S3	S4	S5	S6	S7	S8	S9	S10	PC	B1	B2	B3	B4	B5	A1	HA1	EOG

== Traction ==
As the route is fully electrified, train is hauled by an Howrah Loco Shed / Sealdah Loco Shed-based WAP-7 electric locomotive from Kolkata to Amritsar, and vice versa.

== Rake sharing ==
The train shares its rake with 12315/12316 Ananya Express.
