= Raj Bahadur Gour =

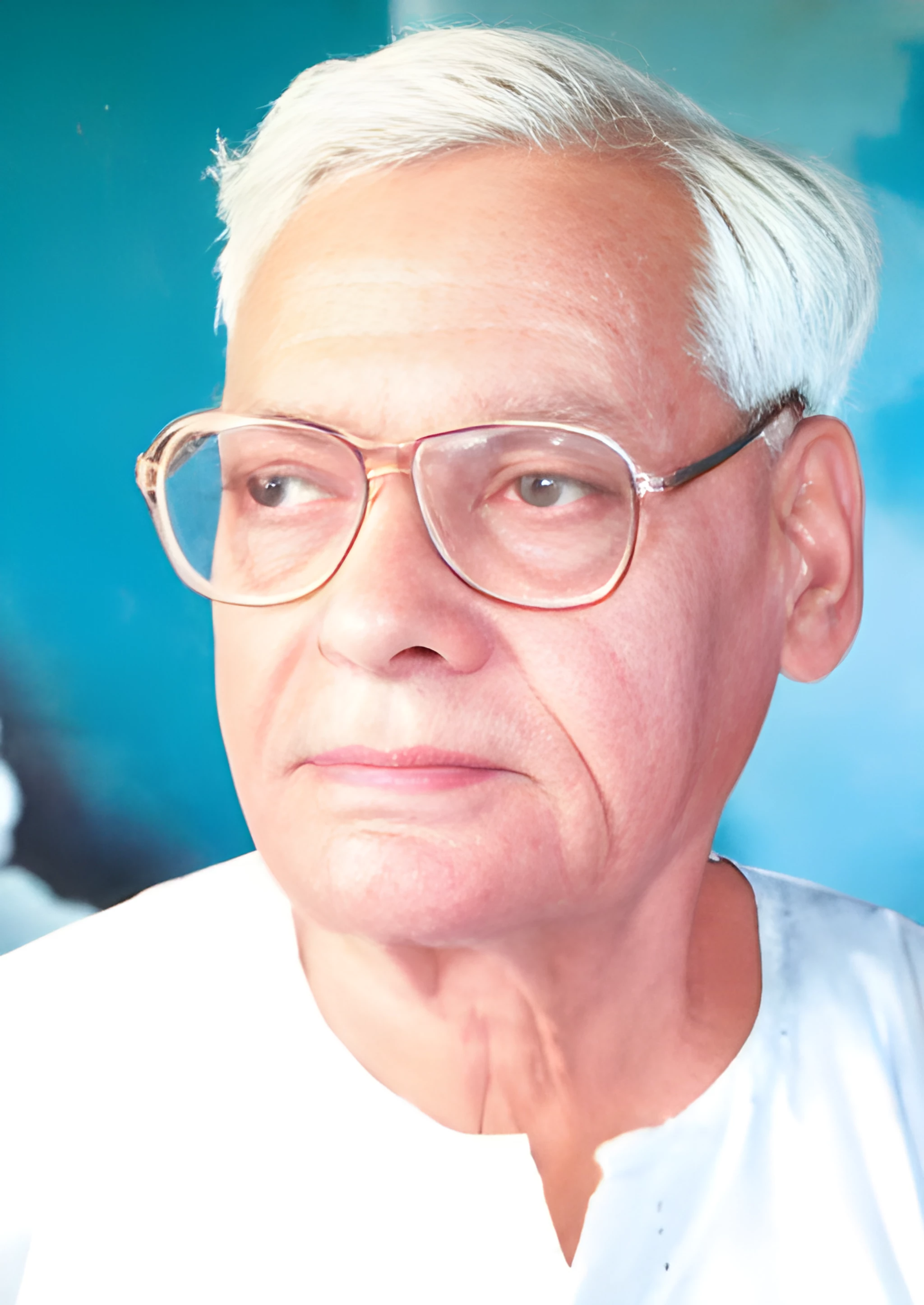
Dr. Raj Bahadur Gour in 2007 (1918 - 2011)

Raj Bahadur Gour was a freedom fighter and trade unionist. He was active with the Comrades Association and the Communist Party of India, and at the forefront of the 1946–1947 Telangana Rebellion against the Nizam of the erstwhile Hyderabad state. He was founder general secretary of the AITUC affiliated All Hyderabad Trade Union Council of which Makhdoom Mohiuddin was the president. He was elected to the Rajya Sabha in 1952 while in jail.

== Early life and education ==
Gour was born in Hyderabad on 21 July 1918. He did his MBBS from Osmania Medical college. Graduated from Osmania Medical College with a degree in medicine, demonstrating fluency in Urdu, the medium of instruction during his time. He joined the freedom struggle during his student life.

== Political activism and the Telangana armed struggle ==
=== From medicine to revolution ===
Gour was an elected member of Rajya Sabha for two terms. He who worked as city secretary of CPI during the troubled years in Hyderabad after its integration, was elected to the Central Executive Committee (CEC) of CPI in 1978. He was a prominent trade union leader.

Gour, who championed the cause of Urdu in India, was president of All India Anjuman Taraqqui-e-Urdu for long. He has a number of Urdu books to his credit. He published memoirs as well as a collection of English articles "Random Writings" in English.

Inspired by the October Socialist Revolution and driven by a strong sense of social justice, Gour joined the "Comrades Association" alongside Makhdoom Mohiuddin, a renowned Urdu poet and revolutionary. He became actively involved in organizing trade unions across various sectors, such as railways, road transport, mills, and collieries. These unions, like the APSRTC Employees Union and the Singareni Collieries Union, grew under his leadership, challenging the Nizam's authority and empowering workers.

Gour played a key role in the Telangana Armed Struggle (1946–1948), a peasant rebellion against the oppressive feudal rule of the Nizam. He rejected the "Standstill Agreement" between the Nizam and the Indian government, as he believed it did not address the grievances of the people. He actively mobilized support for the armed struggle, leading to his arrest and imprisonment multiple times. Despite facing hardships, his dedication to the cause remained unwavering.

== Political career and public service ==
He participated in the anti-Nizam Struggle, built first trade unions in the Nizam state and was a close associate of Comrades Ravi Narayan Reddy and Makhdoom Mohiuddin, the heroes of Telangana Armed Struggle. He wrote the famous booklet "Tri-colour shall fly over Hyderabad" for integration of the Nizam state with India.

Following the merger of Hyderabad with the Indian Union in 1948, Dr. Gour continued his political activism as a member of the Communist Party of India (CPI). He served as the President of the Andhra Pradesh Bank Employees Federation and the State AITUC, and was highly respected for his leadership and negotiating skills. In 1952, while still imprisoned for his role in the Telangana struggle, he was elected to the Rajya Sabha, the upper house of the Indian Parliament. He was re-elected for a full term later and actively advocated for the release of political prisoners and land reforms in his speeches.

=== Beyond politics ===
Gour was a multifaceted figure who transcended the realm of politics. He was a skilled orator, often using humor and wit to connect with audiences. He was also a prolific writer, penning numerous articles and essays on contemporary political issues and workers' rights. His book, "The Tricolour will Fly over Hyderabad," was a popular source of inspiration during the Telangana Struggle. He remained passionate about Urdu literature throughout his life.

== Later life and legacy ==
Gour actively participated in politics until his retirement at the age of 75. However, he always remained accessible to ordinary people, living simply in his Chikkadpalli neighborhood. He continued to donate to educational institutions and other worthy causes. Even after his death in 2011, his commitment to the public good continued as he had willed his body to the Osmania Medical College for research purposes.

Gour's life is a testament to the power of unwavering conviction and selfless service. He was a tireless champion of the downtrodden, a voice for the voiceless, and a leader who led by example. His legacy continues to inspire generations of activists and remind us of the importance of fighting for social justice and a better tomorrow.

A veteran freedom fighter, a hero of Telangana Armed Struggle and communist leader comrade Gour died on 7 October 2011 at Hyderabad. He was 93 years old.

== Articles and books authored ==
He was a poet and a writer, and published several books and articles on the history and politics of Telangana and other subjects. Here is the list of some of his books.

- Gour, Raj Bahadur. Tricolour Shall Fly Over Hyderabad. India, Prachee Publications, 2007.
- Gour, Raj Bahadur. Makhdoom: A Memoir. Communist Party [of India], 1970.
- Gour, Raj Bahadur. Telangana Udyamam: Charitra, Visheshaalu, Parinaamalu. Prajasakti Book House, 2008.
- Gour, Raj Bahadur. Telangana Udyamam: Naa Anubhavalu. Prajasakti Book House, 2009.
- Gour, Raj Bahadur. Telangana Udyamam: Naa Drushtilo. Prajasakti Book House, 2010.
- Gour, Raj Bahadur. Glorious Telengana Armed Struggle. India, Communist Party of India, 1973.
- Gour, Raj Bahadur. Random Writings. India, Makhdoom Society in collaboration with Prachee Publications, Hyderabad, 2002.
- Krishnan, N. K.., Gour, Raj Bahadur., Siddhanta, T. N.. Working Class and the Emergency. India: Communist Party of India, 1975.
- Gour, Raj Bahadur. Telengana Tangle: The Communist Approach. India: Communist Party Publication, 1969.
- Gour, Raj Bahadur. 'Mulki Tangle' in Andhra Pradesh: The Communist Approach. India, Communist Party of India, 1972.
- Gour, Raj Bahadur. Working Class Under Congress Raj. India, D.P. Sinha for the Communist Party of India, 1961.
- Gour, Raj Bahadur., Bhoothalingam, S.. Bury the Bhoothalingam Report. India: AITUC Publication, 1978.
- Gour, Raj Bahadur. ادبى تناظر. India: Anjuman Taraqqī-yi Urdū, Hind, 1991.
- Gour, Raj Bahadur. Adabī mut̤ālaʻe. India: Anjuman Taraqqī-yu Urdū, Āndhrā Pradesh, 1978.
- Muḥīuddīn, Mak̲h̲dūm., Gour, Raj Bahadur., Mallāreḍḍi, Gajjela. Makhdūṃ kavita. India: Viśālāndhra Pabliṣiṅg Haus, 1970.

His body was being donated for research purposes to the Osmania Medical College.
