= Swami Ramanand Tirtha =

Indian politician (1903–1972)

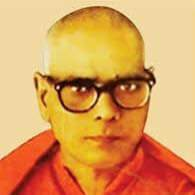
- Born: Vyenkatesh Bhagvanrao Khedgikar; 3 October 1903; Sindagi, Bombay Presidency, British India (present-day Vijayapura, Karnataka, India)
- Died: 22 January 1972 (aged 68); Hyderabad, Andhra Pradesh (present-day Telangana), India
- Resting place: Hyderabad, Andhra Pradesh (now Telangana)
- Occupations: Sanyasi; Educator; Freedom fighter
- Employer: Educator in Ausa in Latur district
- Known for: Indian Independence Movement, Hyderabad Liberation Struggle activism, reorganising and leading the Hyderabad Liberation Struggle
Swami Ramanand Tirtha
Member of the Lok Sabha
- In office 1952–1957
- Preceded by: Constituency Created
- Succeeded by: Mahadevappa Rampure
- Constituency: Gulbarga Lok Sabha constituency
- In office 1957–1962
- Preceded by: Suresh Chandra
- Succeeded by: Bhaurao Dagadurao Deshmukh
- Constituency: Aurangabad, Maharashtra Lok Sabha constituency
Personal details
- Party: Indian National Congress (1952 to 1972)
- Other political affiliations: Hyderabad State Congress (until 1952)

Swami Ramanand Tirtha (or Teerth; IAST: Svāmi Rāmanand Tīrta; 3 October 1903 – 22 January 1972) was an Indian politician, freedom fighter, educator and social activist who led the Hyderabad liberation struggle during the reign of Osman Ali Khan, the last Nizam of Hyderabad State. Swami Ramanand Tirtha was the principal leader of the Hyderabad State Congress. Before taking Sanyasa, his family name was Vyenkatesh Bhagvanrao Khedgikar.

== Family ==
Despite taking Sannyassa or the pledge of renunciation, Swami Ramananda continued to work with the members of the Khedgikar family on his paternal side. His younger brother Bhimrao Bhagvanrao Khedgikar was a renowned educator who settled in the town of Ambajogai, Maharashtra on Swamiji's suggestion and worked with Swami Ramananda to help establish the Shri Yogeshwari Shikshan Sanstha. Since Swami Ramananda had no next of kin, members of his family have continued working towards preserving Swami Ramananda Tirth's legacy of providing education to rural and underprivileged communities as members of the Swami Ramananda Tirth Trust and the Swami Ramananda Tirth Rural Institute.

== Life ==
Swami Ramanand Tirtha fought the Osman Ali Khan, Asaf Jah VII, the Nizam of Hyderabad, after the Hyderabad State Congress was established in 1938. He participated in Satyagrahas ("non-violent resistance" campaigns) and was imprisoned for 111 days by Osman Ali Khan. Swami Ramanand Tirtha is credited for having created a revolutionary movement to integrate Hyderabad State with the Indian Union in 1948. Swami Ramanand Tirtha's ability to galvanize the people in concert with the decisive military victory of the Hyderabad Police Action are credited with the state's successful integration into the India Union.

Swamiji had communist leanings initially, but would later take the renunciant vows of the Hindu sannyasi ("ascetic", "monk") tradition. His original name was Vyenkatesh Bhagvanrao Khedgikar. He was given the name "Swami Ramanand Tirtha" by his guru Lucknow-based Hon'ble Swami Rama Tirth, who initiated him into sanyas, i.e., asceticism. Guru Swami Rama Tirth initiated Swami Ramananda Tirth in the village of Hipparge Rava, Taluka Lohara in Dharashiv district (then Osmanabad) having traveled from north India to his disciple's village after a postal correspondence between the two.

Swami Ramanand Tirtha established Rashtriya Shala ("The National School") at Hipparge Rava. He also worked as a teacher in Ausa in Latur district.

In 1950, Swami Ramananda Tirth founded Nanded Education Society, which today is the parent organization of three institutions, namely, People's High School Nanded, People's College Nanded and Science College Nanded.

== Memorials ==
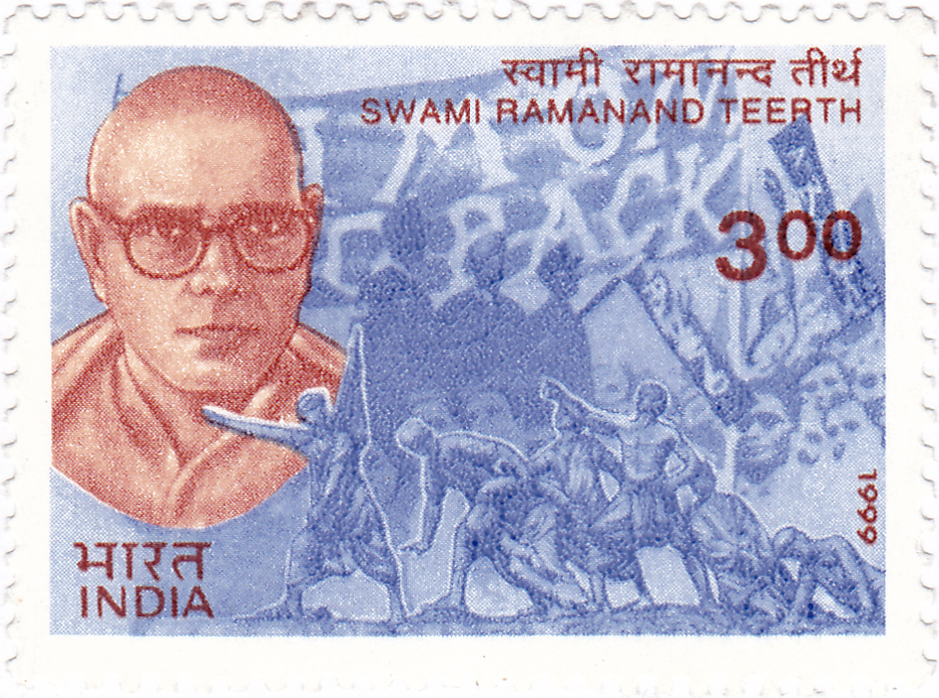
Postal stamp released in 1999

Dr. P.V.Narasimha Rao, former Prime Minister of India started "Swami Ramananda Teerth Memorial" in Hyderabad. Swamiji's mortal remains are resting here in the premises at Brahmanvada, Begumpet, Hyderabad. Several other eminent people from Maharashtra, Telangana, Karnataka, were his followers. Several of them headed mostly congressional governments in their respective states. Some have served in the Central Cabinet, too.

The Swami Ramanand Teerth Marathwada University, Nanded which servers the southern part of Marathwada Region of Maharashtra State, specifically to the districts of Nanded, Latur, Parbhani and Hingoli has been named after him. The university, set up in 1994, has 172 colleges affiliated to it.
