= Suresh Chandra =

Indian politician

Member of Parliament, Lok Sabha
- In office 1952–1957
- Preceded by: Constituency Established
- Succeeded by: Swami Ramanand Tirtha
- Constituency: Aurangabad

Personal details
- Born: 18 May 1912
- Party: Indian National Congress
- Spouse: Swarnalata

Suresh Chandra was an Indian politician, elected to the Lok Sabha, the lower house of the Parliament of India as a member of the Indian National Congress.
