= Comrades Association =

Indian communist organization

The Comrades Association was a communist organization that operated in the State of Hyderabad in India during the rule of the Nizam. It represented the Communist Party of India in Hyderabad State. The Comrades Association played a very influential role in the Andhra Mahasabha. Revolutionary Urdu poets Makhdoom Mohiuddin and Raj Bahadur Gour were among the active figures in the Association. Along with three other groups, the Comrades Association was organized as the Nizam State Communist Committee in 1939, and played an active role in the Telangana Rebellion.
