= Makhdoom Mohiuddin =

Indian activist and writer (1908–1969)

- Born: 4 February 1908; Andole, Medak District, Hyderabad State, British Indian Empire (now in Telangana, India)
- Died: 25 August 1969 (aged 61); Hyderabad, Andhra Pradesh, India (now in Telangana, India)
- Occupation: Urdu Poet
- Writing career
- Period: Pre and Post Independent India
- Genre: Ghazal
- Subject: Revolution

Signature
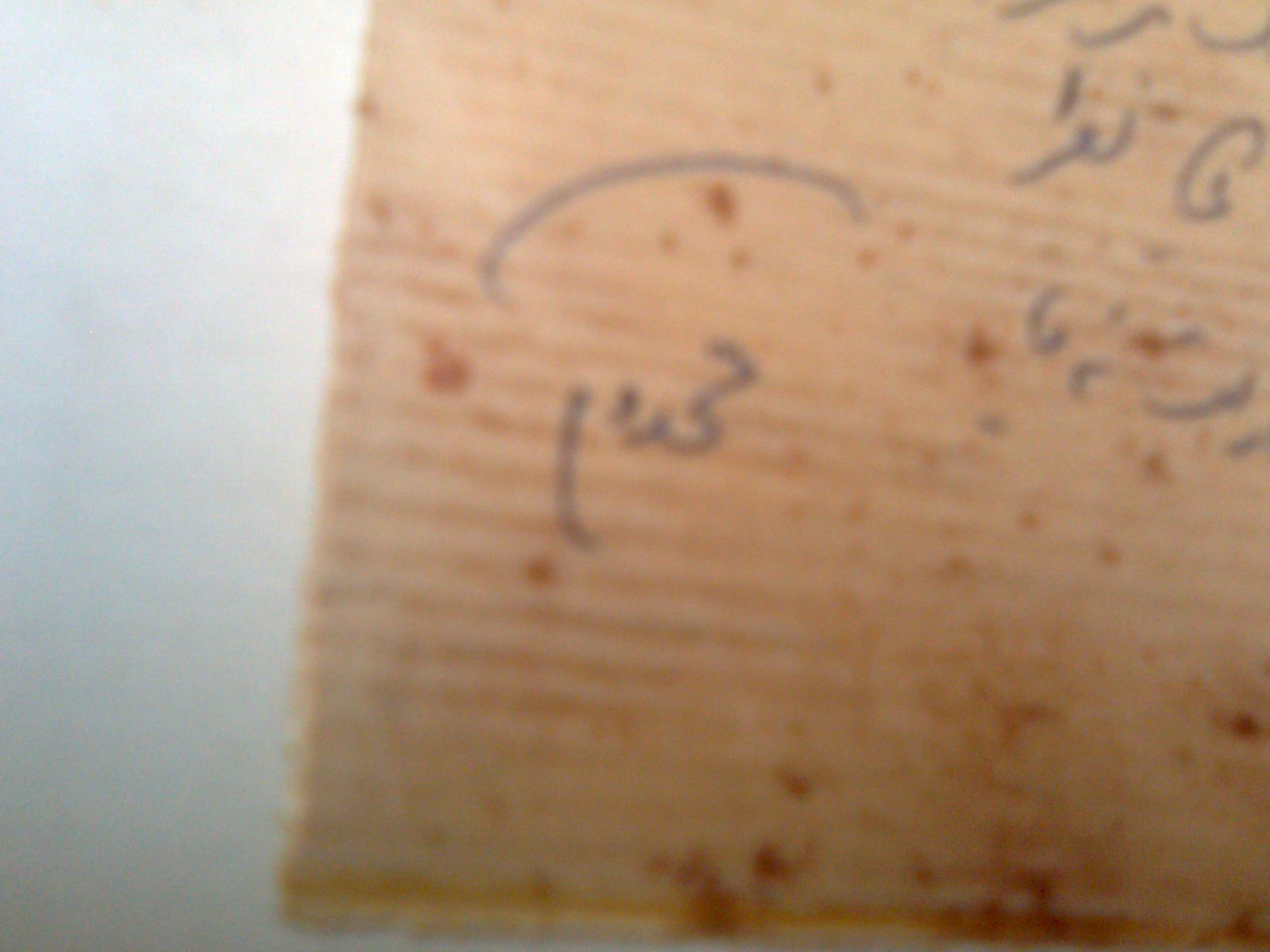

Makhdoom Mohiuddin, or Abu Sayed Muhammad Makhdoom Mohiuddin Khudri, (4 February 1908 – 25 August 1969) was an Urdu poet and Marxist political activist of India who founded the Progressive Writers Union in Hyderabad and was active with the Comrades Association and the Communist Party of India, and at the forefront of the 1946–1947 Telangana Rebellion against the Nizam of the erstwhile Hyderabad state.

== Biography ==
Mohiuddin lectured at the City College in 1934 and taught Urdu literature. He was the founder of the Communist Party in Andhra Pradesh and is regarded as a freedom fighter of India.

He is best known for his collection of poems entitled Bisat-e-Raqs ("The Dance Floor"), for which he was awarded the 1969 Sahitya Akademi Award in Urdu. His published works include the essay Tagore and His Poetry, a play, Hosh ke Nakhun ("Unravelling"), an adaptation of Shaw's Widowers' Houses, and a collection of prose essays. Bisat-e-Raqs is a complete collection of Makhdoom's verse including his two earlier collections Surkh Savera ("The Red Dawn", 1944) and Gul-e-Tar ("The Dew-drenched Rose", 1961)

He is known as Shayar-e-Inquilab' ('Poet of the Revolution'). His ghazals and lyrics have been used in many Hindi films. Among his notable film lyrics are the romantic ghazals: Ek Chameli Ke Mandve Taley, Aap Ki Yaad Aati Rahi Raat Bhar and Phir Chhidi Raat, Baat Phoolon Ki.

He was also a member of Andhra Pradesh Legislative Council from 1956 – 1969 and became opposition leader in the Assembly and was one of the most popular political leaders across India. He traveled to most of the European countries that existed under the umbrella of the Soviet Union and also visited Red China. While in Moscow he met Yuri Gagarin and wrote a poem on him.

On 4 and 5 February 2008, programmes were organised in Hyderabad to mark his birth centenary celebrations in which Mahatma Gandhi Antarrashtriya Hindi Vishwavidyalaya Vibhuti Narain Rai, P. M. Bhargava, and Syed E. Hasnain participated.

== Awards ==
- Sahitya Akademi Award for Urdu Poetry – 1969

== In popular culture ==
In 1991, Doordarshan, an Indian TV station, televised a biographical play about the role Makhdoom Mohiuddin played in the Trade Union and the Indian independence movement and the formation of the Communist Party in Andhra Pradesh. Irrfan Khan portrayed Makhdoom Mohiuddin in this drama series called Kahkashan (galaxy).
