= Hyderabad State Congress =

1938–1948 political party in Hyderabad

The Hyderabad State Congress was a political party in the princely state of Hyderabad that sought civil rights, representative democracy and the union of Hyderabad with the Republic of India. It opposed the autocratic rule of the Nizam of Hyderabad and the militancy of the Razakars. HSC was formed in 1938.

== Background ==
Although technically outside British India, Hyderabad State was closely allied with the British government, with its Nizam having the title of the "Most Faithful Ally of the British Government." The Nizam gave patronage to the Majlis-e-Ittehadul Muslimeen, a party dedicated to preserving Islamic rule in the state, and allowed its militant wing, the Razakars, to operate freely. Its leaders Bahadur Yar Jung and Qasim Razvi became close advisers to the Nizam.

Up to 1920, there was no political organisation of any kind in Hyderabad. In that year, following British pressure, the Nizam issued a firman appointing a special officer to investigate constitutional reforms. It was welcomed enthusiastically by a section, but the Nizam and the special officer ignored all of the demands for consultation.

An organisation, called Andhra Jana Sangham (later renamed Andhra Mahasabha), was formed in November 1921, and focused on educating the masses of Telangana in political awareness. With leading members such as Madapati Hanumantha Rao, Burgula Ramakrishna Rao and M. Narsing Rao, Pulijala Venkata Ranga Rao its activities included urging merchants to resist offering freebies to government officials and encouraging labourers to resist the system of begar (free labour requested at the behest of state).

Alarmed by its activities, the Nizam passed a powerful gagging order in 1929, requiring all public meetings to obtain prior permission, but the organisation persisted by mobilising on social issues such as the protection of ryots, women's rights, abolition of the devadasi system and purdah and uplifting of Dalits. The Andhra Mahasabha's move towards politics also inspired similar movements in Marathwada and Karnataka in 1937, giving rise to the Maharashtra Parishad and Karnataka Parishad, respectively.

Following the Government of India Act 1935, British India introduced major constitutional reforms, with a loose federal structure for India and provincial autonomy. In the provincial elections of February 1937, the Indian National Congress emerged with clear majority in most provinces of British India and formed provincial governments.

The Andhra Mahasabha passed a resolution in favour of responsible government and the parallel organisations of Maharastrha Parishad and Karnataka Parishad were formed in their respective regions. The Nizam appointed a fresh Constitutional Reforms Committee in September 1937. However, the gagging orders of the 1920s remained curtailing the freedom of press and restrictions on public speeches and meetings. In response, a 'Hyderabad People's Convention' was created, with a working committee of 23 leading Hindus and 5 Muslims. The convention ratified a report, which was submitted to the Constitutional Reforms Committee in January 1938. However, four of the five Muslim members of the working committee refused to sign the report, which reduced its potential impact.

== Formation and Satyagraha ==
In February 1938, the Indian National Congress passed the Haripura resolution declaring that the princely states are "an integral part of India," and that it stood for "the same political, social and economic freedom in the States as in the rest of India."

Encouraged by this, the standing committee of the People's Convention proposed to form a Hyderabad State Congress and an enthusiastic drive to enrol members was begun. By July 1938, the committee claimed to have enrolled 1200 primary members and declared that elections would soon be held for the office-bearers. It called upon both Hindus and Muslims of the state to "shed mutual distrust" and join the "cause of responsible government under the aegis of the Ashaf Jahi dynasty." The Nizam responded by passing a new Public Safety Act on 6 September 1938, three days before the scheduled elections, and issued an order that the Hyderabad State Congress would be deemed unlawful.

Negotiations with the Nizam's government to lift the ban ended in failure. The Hyderabad issue was widely discussed in the newspapers in British India. P. M. Bapat, a leader of the Indian National Congress from Pune, declared that he would launch a satyagraha (civil disobedience movement) in Hyderabad. The Arya Samaj leaders hoped to capitalise on the communal tensions that had been on the boil since early 1938. Perhaps in a bid not to be outdone, the activists of the Hyderabad State Congress formed a 'Committee of Action' and initiated a satyagraha on 24 October 1938. Members of the organisation were fielded, who openly declared they belonged to the Hyderabad State Congress and courted arrest. The Arya Samaj-Hindu Mahasabha combine also launched their own satyagraha on the same day.

The Indian National Congress refused to back the satyagraha of the State Congress. The Haripura resolution had in fact been a compromise between the moderates and the radicals. Gandhi had been wary of direct involvement in the states lest the agitations degenerate into violence. The Congress high command was also keen on a firmer collaboration between Hindus and Muslims, which the State Congress lacked. Padmaja Naidu wrote a lengthy report to Gandhi where she castigated the State Congress for lacking unity and cohesion and for being 'communal in [her] sense of the word'. On 24 December, the State Congress suspended the agitation after 300 activists had courted arrest.

The response from the state's Hindus was lacklustre. Eventually, the Nizam government reached a compromise with the Hindu organisations, setting up a Religious Affairs Committee and announcing constitutional reforms by 20 July. Subsequently, the Hindu organisations suspended their campaigns and all their imprisoned activists were released. However, the Hyderabad State Congress continued to be banned till 1946 and its jailed activists remained behind bars.

== Activity in 1940s ==
In 1942, the leaders of the Hyderabad Congress launched a non-violent campaign of civil disobedience, a satyagraha, for civil rights, representative democracy alongside the Quit India movement led by the Indian National Congress.

The Nizam's government finally ended the ban on the State Congress in April, 1946 after the end of the Quit India struggle in British India and the beginning of the process of granting independence to India from British rule.

== Union with India ==
The Hyderabad State Congress began actively campaigning for the state of Hyderabad to join the Union of India upon independence, which the Nizam was resisting. The State Congress called for 7 August 1947 to be observed as "Join Indian Union" Day. Protests, strikes and flag-hoisting broke out across the state, and the Nizam's government banned the Congress again and conducted mass arrests. The Razakars in turn threatened to enact mass pogroms against Hindu civilians in Hyderabad and provoke violence across India. The crisis continued until September, 1948 when the Indian government authorized the Indian Army to annex Hyderabad that led to massacre of many civilians.

== Bibliography ==
- Benichou, Lucien D. (2000), From Autocracy to Integration: Political Developments in Hyderabad State, 1938–1948, Orient Blackswan, ISBN 978-81-250-1847-6
- Smith, Wilfred Cantwell (January 1950), "Hyderabad: Muslim Tragedy", Middle East Journal, 4 (1): 27–51, JSTOR 4322137
