= Sadpur =

- Census Town
- Location in West Bengal, India Sadpur (India)
- Coordinates: 22.86°N 88.75°E
- Country: India
- State: West Bengal
- District: North 24 Parganas

Area
  - Total: 1.63 km^{2} (0.63 sq mi)

Population (2011)
  - Total: 7,773
  - Density: 4,770/km^{2} (12,400/sq mi)

Languages
  - Official: Bengali, English
- Time zone: UTC+5:30 (IST)
- ISO 3166 code: IN-WB
- Vehicle registration: WB
- Lok Sabha constituency: Barasat
- Website: north24parganas.nic.in

Sadpur is a census town in the Habra I CD block in the Barasat Sadar subdivision in the North 24 Parganas district in the Indian state of West Bengal.

== Geography ==
Cities, towns and locations in Barasat subdivision, North 24 Parganas
M: municipal town, CT: census town, R: rural/ urban centre, H: historical centre
Owing to space constraints in the small map, the actual locations in a larger map may vary slightly

=== Location ===
Sadpur is located at 22.86°N 88.75°E.

Sadpur, Maslandapur, Nokpul and Betpuli form a cluster of census towns, south of Gobardanga. The Jamuna separates Gobardanga from this cluster. Habra police station serves this area.

=== Area overview ===
The area covered in the map alongside is largely a part of the north Bidyadhari Plain. located in the lower Ganges Delta. The country is flat. It is a little raised above flood level and the highest ground borders the river channels.54.67% of the people of the densely populated area lives in the urban areas and 45.33% lives in the rural areas.

Note: The map alongside presents some of the notable locations in the subdivision. All places marked in the map are linked in the larger full screen map.

== Demographics ==
According to the 2011 Census of India, Sadpur had a total population of 7,737, of which 3,946 (51%) were males and 3,827 (49%) were females. The population in the age range 0-6 years of age was 641. The total number of literate persons in Sadpur was 6,325 (88.68% of the population over 6 years).

At the 2001 census, Sadpur had a population of 6,742. Males constituted 51% of the population and females 49%. Sadpur has an average literacy rate of 78%, higher than the then national average of 59.5%: male literacy was 83% and female literacy 73%. 10% of the population were under 6 years of age.

== Infrastructure ==
As per District Census Handbook 2011, Sadpur covered an area of 1.63 km^{2}. It had 2 primary schools, the nearest middle, secondary and senior secondary schools were 1 km away at Maslandapur.

== Transport ==
Sadpur is beside State Highway 3.

Machhalandapur railway station, located nearby at Maslandapur, on the Sealdah-Bangaon branch line, is 53.5 km from Sealdah and is part of the Kolkata Suburban Railway system.

== Education ==
Gobardanga Hindu College at Gobardanga is located nearby.

== Healthcare ==
Maslandapur Rural Hospital at Maslandapur with 30 beds, located nearby, functions as the main medical facility in Habra I CD Block.

== See also ==
Map of Habra I CD Block on Page 289 of District Census Handbook.
