= Nokpul =

- Census Town
- Location in West Bengal, India Nokpul (India)
- Coordinates: 22.873248°N 88.739625°E
- Country: India
- State: West Bengal
- District: North 24 Parganas

Population (2011)
  - Total: 7,737

Languages
  - Official: Bengali, English
- Time zone: UTC+5:30 (IST)
- ISO 3166 code: IN-WB
- Vehicle registration: WB
- Lok Sabha constituency: Barasat
- Website: north24parganas.nic.in

Nokpul is a census town in the Habra I CD block in the Barasat sadar subdivision in the North 24 Parganas district in the Indian state of West Bengal.

== Geography ==
Cities, towns and locations in Barasat subdivision, North 24 Parganas
M: municipal town, CT: census town, R: rural/ urban centre, H: historical centre
Owing to space constraints in the small map, the actual locations in a larger map may vary slightly

=== Location ===
Nokpul is located at 22.873248°N 88.739625°E.

Nokpul, Gobardanga, Habra form a cluster of census towns, south part of Gobardanga. The Jamuna separates Gobardanga from this cluster. Habra police station serves this area.

=== Area overview ===
The area covered in the map alongside is largely a part of the north Bidyadhari Plain. located in the lower Ganges Delta. The country is flat. It is a little raised above flood level and the highest ground borders the river channels. 54.67% of the people of the densely populated area lives in the urban areas and 45.33% lives in the rural areas.

Note: The map alongside presents some of the notable locations in the subdivision. All places marked in the map are linked in the larger full screen map.

== Demographics ==
According to the 2011 Census of India, Nokpul had a total population of 7,737, of which 4,030 (52%) were males and 3,707 (48%) were females. Population in the age range 0-6 years was 671. The total number of literate persons in Nokpul was 6,047 (85.58% of the population over 6 years).

As of 2001 India census, Nokpul had a population of 6647. Males constitute 53% of the population and females 47%. Nokpul has an average literacy rate of 81%, higher than the national average of 59.5%: male literacy is 85%, and female literacy is 77%. In Nokpul, 9% of the population is under 6 years of age.

== Economy ==
=== Commuters ===
As per 2011 census, a large proportion of people in Habra I CD block earn their livelihood as ‘other workers’, which include office, factory and transport workers, professionals and business people and so on. (See Habra I for details). Around a total of 32 lakh people from all around the city commute to Kolkata daily for work. In the Sealdah-Bangaon section there are 58 trains that carry commuters from 24 railway stations. In the Seadah-Hasnabad sections 32 trains carry commuters from 30 stations.

=== Infrastructure ===
As per District Census Handbook 2011, Nokpul covered an area of 1.71 km^{2}. It had 6 primary schools, 1 middle school, 1 secondary school and 1 senior secondary school. The nearest degree college was located 4 km away at Gobardanga. The nearest hospital was 12 km, the nearest dispensary/ health centre was 8 km away, the nearest family welfare centre was 12 km away, the nearest maternity and child welfare centre was 12 km away and the nearest maternity home was 12 km away.

== Transport ==
Nokpul is beside State Highway 3.

Machhalandapur railway station, located nearby at Maslandapur, on the Sealdah-Bangaon branch line, is 53.5 km from Sealdah and is part of the Kolkata Suburban Railway system.

== Education ==
Gobardanga Hindu College at Gobardanga is located nearby.

== Healthcare ==
Maslandapur Rural Hospital at Maslandapur with 30 beds, located nearby, functions as the main medical facility in Habra I CD Block.

North 24 Parganas district has been identified as one of the areas where ground water is affected by arsenic contamination.

== See also ==
Map of Habra I CD Block on Page 289 of District Census Handbook.
