= Maslandapur =

Moslondpur
- Village
- Location in West Bengal, India Moslondpur (India)
- Coordinates: 22°51′20″N 88°44′40″E
- Country: India
- State: West Bengal
- District: North 24 Parganas

Area
  - Total: 1.7 km^{2} (0.66 sq mi)

Population (2011)
  - Total: 10,790
  - Density: 6,300/km^{2} (16,000/sq mi)

Languages
  - Official: Bengali, English
- Time zone: UTC+5:30 (IST)
- ISO 3166 code: IN-WB
- Vehicle registration: WB
- Lok Sabha constituency: Barasat, Bangaon
- Vidhan Sabha constituency: Habra, Gaighata
- Website: north24parganas.nic.in

Maslandapur is a Town in the Barasat CD block in Barasat sadar subdivision of North 24 Parganas district in the Indian state of West Bengal.

== Geography ==
Cities, towns and locations in Barasat subdivision, North 24 Parganas
M: municipal town, CT: census town, R: rural/ urban centre, H: historical centre
Owing to space constraints in the small map, the actual locations in a larger map may vary slightly

=== Location ===
Maslandapur is located at 22°51′20″N 88°44′40″E.

Maslandapur, Nokpul, Sadpur and Betpuli form a cluster of census towns, south of Gobardanga. The Jamuna separates Gobardanga from this cluster. Habra police station serves this area.

PIN Code of Maslandapur is 743289.

=== Area overview ===
The area covered in the map alongside is largely a part of the north Bidyadhari Plain. located in the lower Ganges Delta. The country is flat. It is a little raised above flood level and the highest ground borders the river channels. 54.67% of the people of the densely populated area lives in the urban areas and 45.33% lives in the rural areas.

Note: The map alongside presents some of the notable locations in the subdivision. All places marked in the map are linked in the larger full screen map.

== Demographics ==
According to the 2011 Census of India, Machhlandapurr had a total population of 10,790, of which 5,519 (51%) were males and 5,271 (49%) were females. Population in the age range 0-6 years was 879. The total number of literate persons in Machhlandapurr was 8,708 (85.58% of the population over 6 years).

As of 2001 India census, Machhlandapurr had a population of 9,706. Males constitute 51% of the population and females 49%. Machhlandapurr has an average literacy rate of 78%, higher than the national average of 59.5%: male literacy is 84%, and female literacy is 72%. In Machhlandapurr, 9% of the population is under 6 years of age.

== Economy ==
=== Commuters ===
As per 2011 census, a large proportion of people in Habra I CD block earn their livelihood as ‘other workers’, which include office, factory and transport workers, professionals and business people and so on. (See Habra I for details). Around a total of 32 lakh people from all around the city commute to Kolkata daily for work. In the Sealdah-Bangaon section there are 58 trains that carry commuters from 24 railway stations. In the Seadah-Hasnabad sections 32 trains carry commuters from 30 stations.

=== Infrastructure ===
As per District Census Handbook 2011, Maslandapur covered an area of 1.7 km^{2}. It had many primary schools, 1 middle school, 1 secondary schools and 3 senior secondary school.

== Transport ==
Maslandapur is situated beside State Highway 3.

Machhalandapur railway station is on the Sealdah-Bangaon branch line. It is 53.5 km far away from Sealdah and is part of the Kolkata Suburban Railway system.

Maslandapur is a Bus Junction, by Basirhat Road and tentulia Road, one can commute to Basirhat and Balti respectively.Also there is Auto & Car(Magic) service for areas like Chatra, Charghat, Chandipur, Mogra, Bagjola, Chakla(Loknath Dham), Katiahat, Keotsa, Fultola, Habra, Kolsur, Rudrapur, etc.

== Education ==
Maslandapur Bhudeb Smriti Balika Vidyalaya is a higher secondary school for girls in Maslandapur. Rajballavpur High School and Dhakshin Chatra High School are higher secondary schools for boys in Maslandapur.

Many Govt. Primary schools and also some other Private Primary Schools are here.

Gobardanga Hindu College at Gobardanga and Sree Chaitanya Mahavidyalaya at Habra are located nearby.

== Healthcare ==
Maslandapur Rural Hospital with 30 beds functions as the main medical facility in Habra I CD block.

North 24 Parganas district has been identified as one of the areas where ground water is affected by arsenic contamination.

== Notable persons ==
- Antara Mitra, Indian Playback Singer
- Shilton Paul, Indian Goalkeeper

== See also ==
Map of Habra I CD Block on Page 289 of District Census Handbook.
