= Sadpur (disambiguation) =

Sadpur is a village in North 24 Parganas district, West Bengal, India.

It may also refer to:

- Sadpur, Uttar Pradesh, village in Muzaffarnagar district, Uttar Pradesh
- Sadpur, Chanditala-I, village in Hooghly district, West Bengal
