= Madhyamgram railway station =

Railway station in West Bengal, India

Madhyamgram
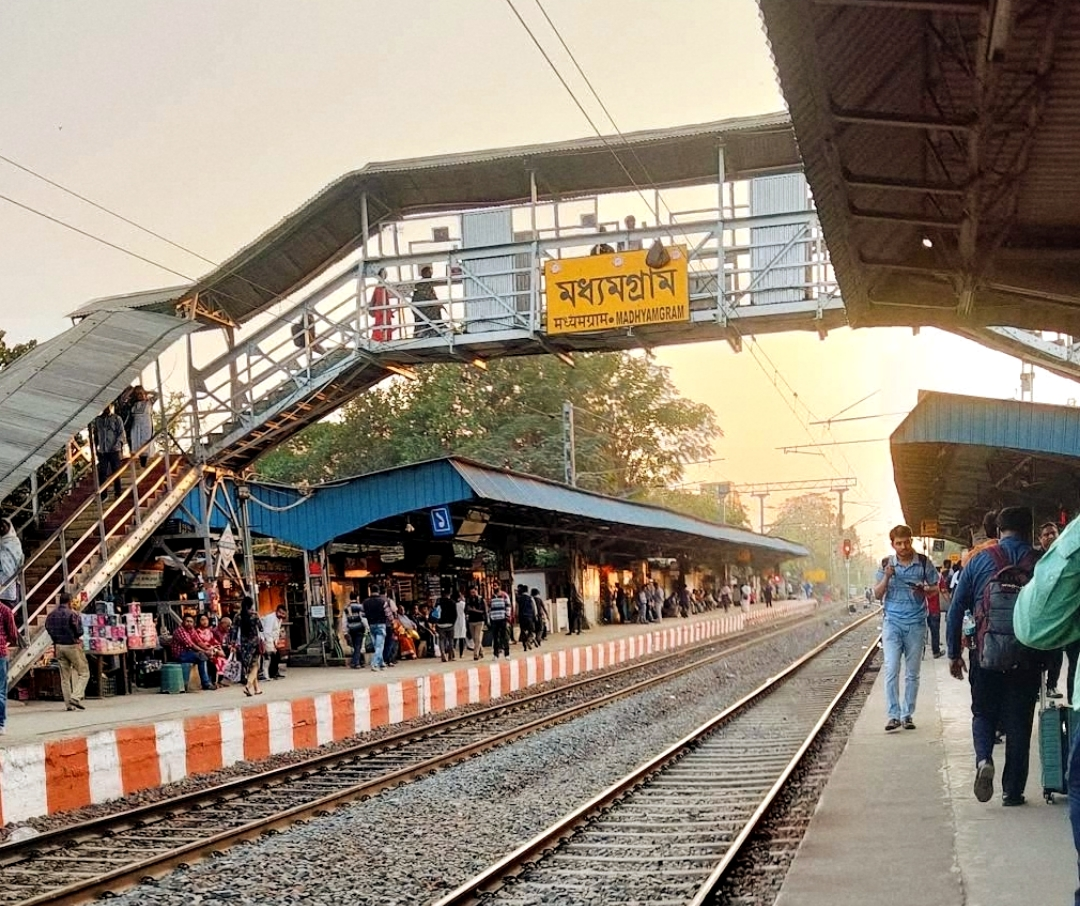

General information
- Location: Madhyamgram, North 24 Parganas district, West Bengal; India
- Coordinates: 22.694665°N 88.452830°E
- Elevation: 13 metres (43 ft)
- System: Kolkata Suburban Railway station
- Owner: Indian Railways
- Operator: Eastern Railway
- Platforms: 3
- Tracks: 3

Construction
- Structure type: At grade
- Parking: Not available

Other information
- Status: Active
- Station code: MMG
- Zone(s): Eastern Railway
- Division(s): Sealdah

History
- Opened: 1906; 120 years ago
- Electrified: 1972; 54 years ago

Services
Preceding station	Kolkata Suburban Railway	Following station
New Barrackpur towards Sealdah	Eastern Line Dum Dum–Bangaon branch line	Hridaypur towards Bangaon Junction
Route map
Location
- Location within West Bengal

Madhyamgram railway station is a Kolkata Suburban Railway station in the town of Madhyamgram. It serves the local areas of Madhyamgram, Badu and Sajirhat in North 24 Parganas district, West Bengal, India.

== History ==
The main line of the Eastern Bengal Railway from Sealdah to Ranaghat, was opened in 1862 and extended the same year to Kushtia, now in Bangladesh. In 1882–84 the Bengal Central Railway Company constructed two lines: one from Dum Dum to Khulna, now in Bangladesh, via Bangaon and the other linking Ranaghat and Bangaon. The Madhyamgram railway station lies in the Dum Dum–Bangaon section and was opened in 1906..

=== Redevelopment ===
In 2024, Ministry of Railways allocated ₹13.27 crore (US$1.4 million) for the redevelopment purpose of this station under the Amrit Bharat Station Scheme.

== Electrification ==
The Sealah–Dum Dum–Barasat–Ashok Nagar–Bangaon sector was electrified in 1972.

== Station complex ==
The structure of the station is not so large. There is only one entrance in platform no. 1. The computerised ticket counter is present in platform no. 1. All the Sealdah and Dum Dum-bound trains arrive at platform no.1 and all the Bangaon, Gobardanga, Thakurnagar, Habra, Duttapukur, Basirhat and Hasnabad-bound trains arrive at platform no. 2 and 3. There are many food stalls and vendors on both the platforms. A foot overbridge connects the two platforms. A level crossing exists at the southernmost end of the railway station. There is a road overbridge to the north of the station and to the south, there exists the bridge over the Noai Canal.

=== Station layout ===
G	Street level	Exit/Entrance & ticket counter
P1	FOB, Side platform, No-1 doors will open on the left/right
P1	Track 1	Towards →Sealdah→ →
P1	Track 2	Towards ←Bangaon← ←
P1	FOB, Island platform, No- 2 doors will open on the left/right
P1	Island platform, No- 3 doors will open on the left/right
P1	Track 3

== Metro Railway ==
=== Extension plan from Noapara to Barasat ===
The proposed Kolkata Metro Yellow Line extension alignment pass through Dum Dum Cantonment and Jessore Road up to Biman Bandar station. From there, the line would run under Jessore Road until New Barrackpore before reaching the surface at Madhyamgram station. From Madhyamgram to Barasat, the alignment would be elevated. However, for crossing the existing road overbridge at Madhyamgram and Barasat, the alignment would descend gradually to ground level and rise again on viaduct. This is supposed to be beneficial for the people of North 24 Parganas district and will bring them closer to Kolkata's Business district. This would reduce the heavy pressure on Sealdah–Barasat section of Eastern Railways. The Madhyamgram Metro railway station is to be constructed in the Madhyamgram–Barasat section.

Work for the Noapara–Barasat (via NSC Bose Airport) metro extension has come to a halt as construction giant L&T has pulled out of the 17 km metro corridor project. L&T was unable to get on with the work due to the encroachment on railway land. L&T has moved out all major equipment from the project site at Barasat and has closed down two of the three site offices. The lone site office is locked.

== See also ==
- North 24 Parganas district
- Indian Railways
- Sealdah railway station
- Sealdah–Hasnabad–Bangaon–Ranaghat line
- Bangaon Junction railway station
- Transport in West Bengal
- List of railway stations in India
