= Majhergram railway station =

It is located between Nadia and North 24 parganas but actually situated in Nadia

Majhergram
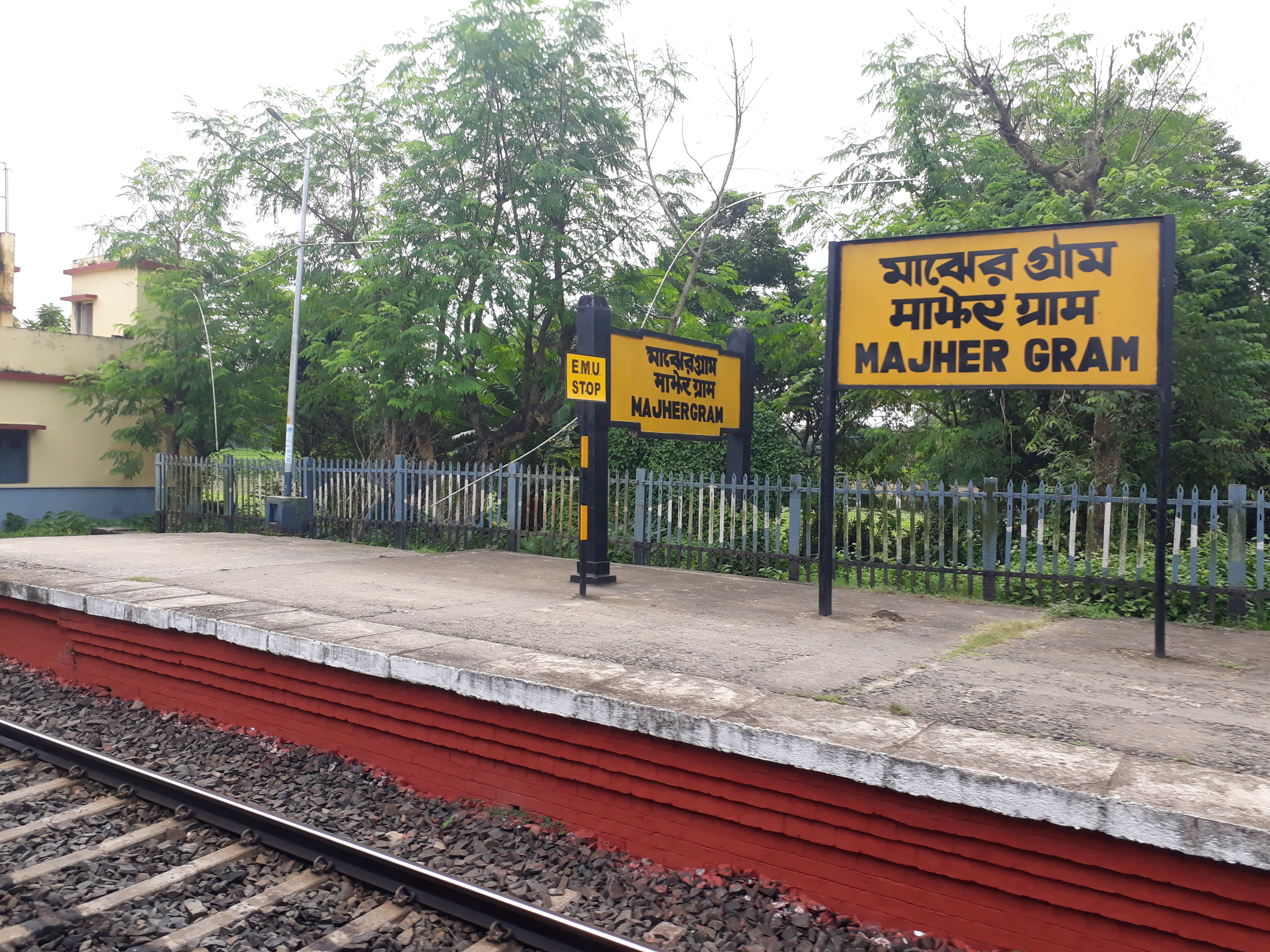

General information
- Location: Majhergram, Nadia district, West Bengal; India
- Coordinates: 23.109023°N 88.688136°E
- Elevation: 13 metres (43 ft)
- System: Kolkata Suburban Railway station
- Owner: Indian Railways
- Operator: Eastern Railway
- Line: Sealdah–Hasnabad–Bangaon–Ranaghat line of Kolkata Suburban Railway
- Platforms: 2
- Tracks: 2

Construction
- Structure type: At grade
- Parking: Not available
- Cycle facilities: Not available

Other information
- Status: Functional
- Station code: MAJ
- Zone(s): Eastern Railway
- Division(s): Sealdah

History
- Opened: 1884; 142 years ago
- Electrified: 1972; 54 years ago

Services
| Preceding station | Kolkata Suburban Railway | Following station |
|---|---|---|
| Akaipur towards Bangaon Junction | Eastern Line Bangaon–Ranaghat line | Gangnapur towards Ranaghat Junction |
Route map
Location
- Location within West Bengal Location within India

Majhergram railway station is part of the Kolkata Suburban Railway system and operated by Eastern Railway. It is located on the Bangaon–Ranaghat line in Nadia district in the Indian state of West Bengal.

== See also ==
- Sealdah railway station
- Sealdah–Hasnabad–Bangaon–Ranaghat line
- Ranaghat Junction railway station
- Nadia district
- Indian Railways
- List of railway stations in India
- Bangaon Junction railway station
