= Bisharpara Kodaliya railway station =

Railway station in West Bengal, India

Bisharpara Kodaliya
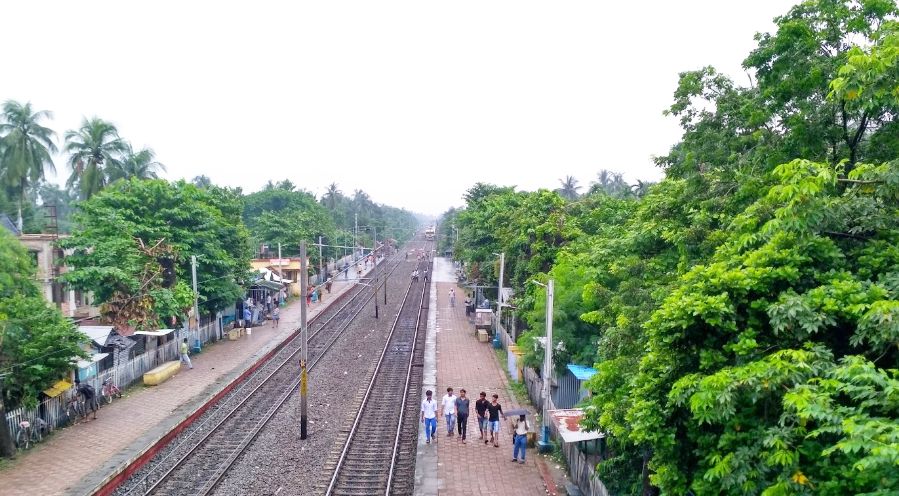
- Bisharpara Kodaliya railway station

General information
- Location: Bisharpara, Birati, North Dumdum, West Bengal 700158; India
- Coordinates: 22.676154°N 88.434634°E
- Elevation: 8 metres (26 ft)
- System: Kolkata Suburban Railway station
- Owner: Indian Railways
- Operator: Eastern Railway
- Line: Sealdah–Hasnabad–Bangaon–Ranaghat line of Kolkata Suburban Railway
- Platforms: 2
- Tracks: 2

Construction
- Structure type: At grade
- Parking: Not available
- Cycle facilities: Not available

Other information
- Status: Functional
- Station code: BRPK
- Zone(s): Eastern Railway
- Division(s): Sealdah

History
- Opened: 2008; 18 years ago
- Electrified: 2008; 18 years ago

Services
Preceding station	Kolkata Suburban Railway	Following station
Birati towards Sealdah	Eastern Line Dum Dum–Bangaon branch line	New Barrackpore towards Bangaon Junction
Route map
Location
- Location within Kolkata Location within West Bengal

Bisharpara Kodaliya railway station is a Kolkata Suburban Railway station in Bisharpara. It serves the local areas of Bisharpara, Kodaliya and Michael Nagar in North 24 Parganas district, West Bengal, India. Its code is BRPK.

== History ==
This station was built in 2008. Earlier it was a halt station where only a few suburban trains halted but now most of the trains stop here. Earlier people of this localities had to go to New Barrackpur railway station or Birati railway station to board trains. The station has improved accessibility and catalyzed local development.

Bisharpara Kodaliya is located on Sealdah–Hasnabad–Bangaon–Ranaghat line of Kolkata Suburban Railway. The link between Dum Dum to Khulna now in Bangladesh, via Bangaon was constructed by Bengal Central Railway Company in 1882–84. The Sealah–Dum Dum–Barasat–Ashok Nagar–Bangaon sector was electrified in 1963–64.

== Station complex ==
The station consists of two platforms. The platforms are poorly sheltered. Facilities include water and sanitation. The station lacks a proper train announcement system and a proper approach road.

== See also ==
- North 24 Parganas district
- Indian Railways
- Sealdah railway station
- Sealdah–Hasnabad–Bangaon–Ranaghat line
- Bangaon Junction railway station
- Transport in West Bengal
- List of railway stations in India
