= New Barrackpur railway station =

Railway station in West Bengal, India

New Barrackpur
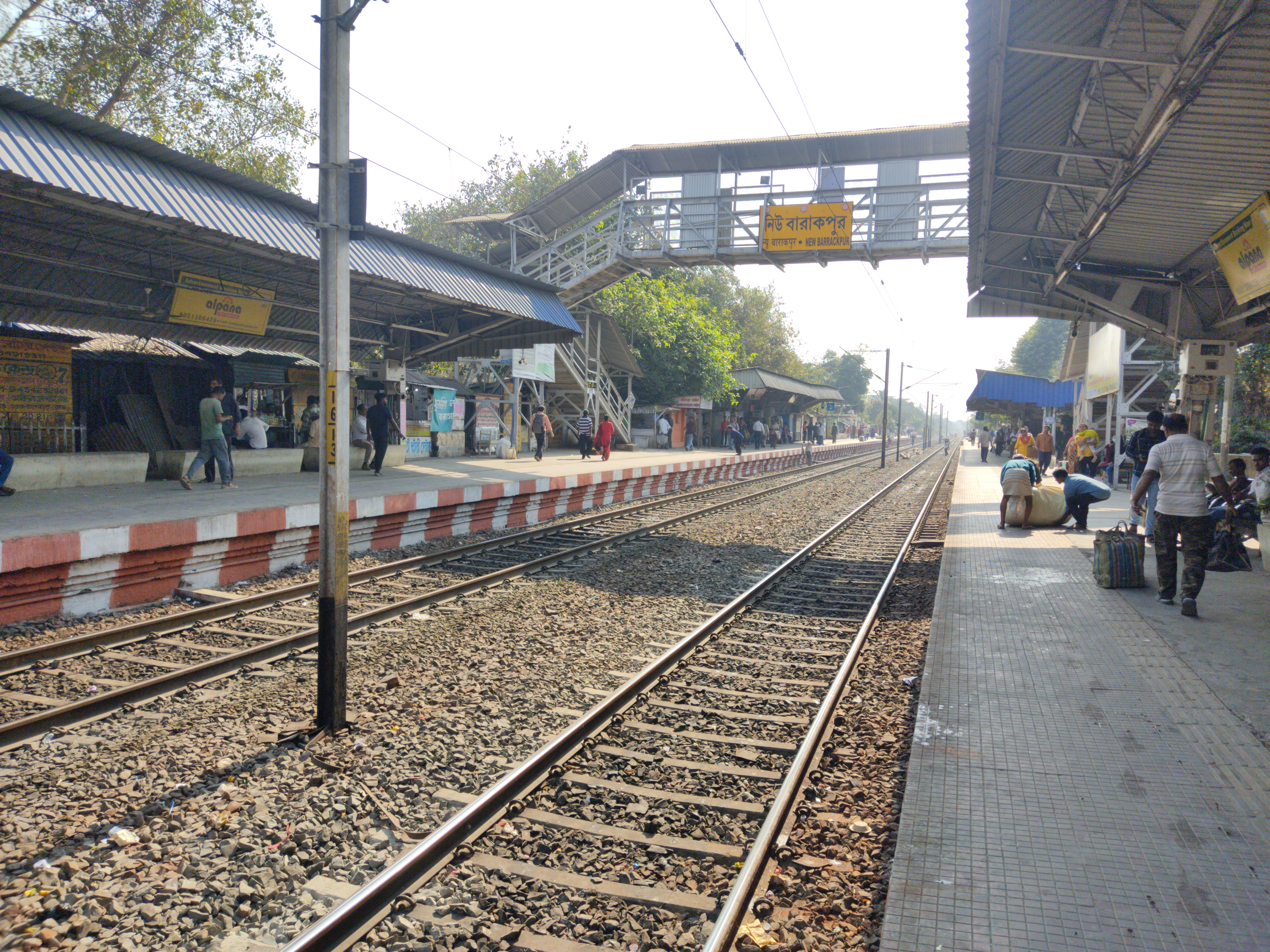

General information
- Location: New Barrackpur, North 24 Parganas, West Bengal; India
- Coordinates: 22.686766°N 88.444612°E
- Elevation: 10 metres (33 ft)
- System: Kolkata Suburban Railway station
- Owner: Indian Railways
- Operator: Eastern Railway
- Lines: Kolkata Suburban Railway; Sealdah–Hasnabad–Bangaon–Ranaghat line
- Platforms: 2
- Tracks: 2

Construction
- Structure type: At grade
- Parking: No
- Cycle facilities: Yes

Other information
- Status: Double electric line
- Station code: NBE
- Zone(s): Eastern Railway
- Division(s): Sealdah

History
- Opened: 1906; 120 years ago
- Electrified: 1972; 54 years ago

Services
Preceding station	Kolkata Suburban Railway	Following station
Bisharpara Kodaliya towards Sealdah	Eastern Line Dum Dum–Bangaon branch line	Madhyamgram towards Bangaon Junction
Route map
Location
- Location within West Bengal

New Barrackpur railway station is a Kolkata Suburban Railway station in New Barrackpur. Its code is NBE. It serves New Barrackpur and surrounding areas. The station consists of two platforms. The platforms are not well sheltered. It has many facilities including water and sanitation. There is a proper approach road to this railway station.

New Barrackpur is located on Sealdah–Hasnabad–Bangaon–Ranaghat line of Kolkata Suburban Railway. Link between Dum Dum to Khulna now in Bangladesh, via Bangaon was constructed by Bengal Central Railway Company in 1882–84. The Sealah–Dum Dum–Barasat–Ashok Nagar–Bangaon sector was electrified in 1963–64.

== See also ==
- North 24 Parganas district
- Indian Railways
- Sealdah
- Sealdah–Hasnabad–Bangaon–Ranaghat line
- Bangaon Junction
- Transport in West Bengal
- List of railway stations in India
