= Naba Raynagar railway station =

Railway station in West Bengal, India

Naba Raynagar
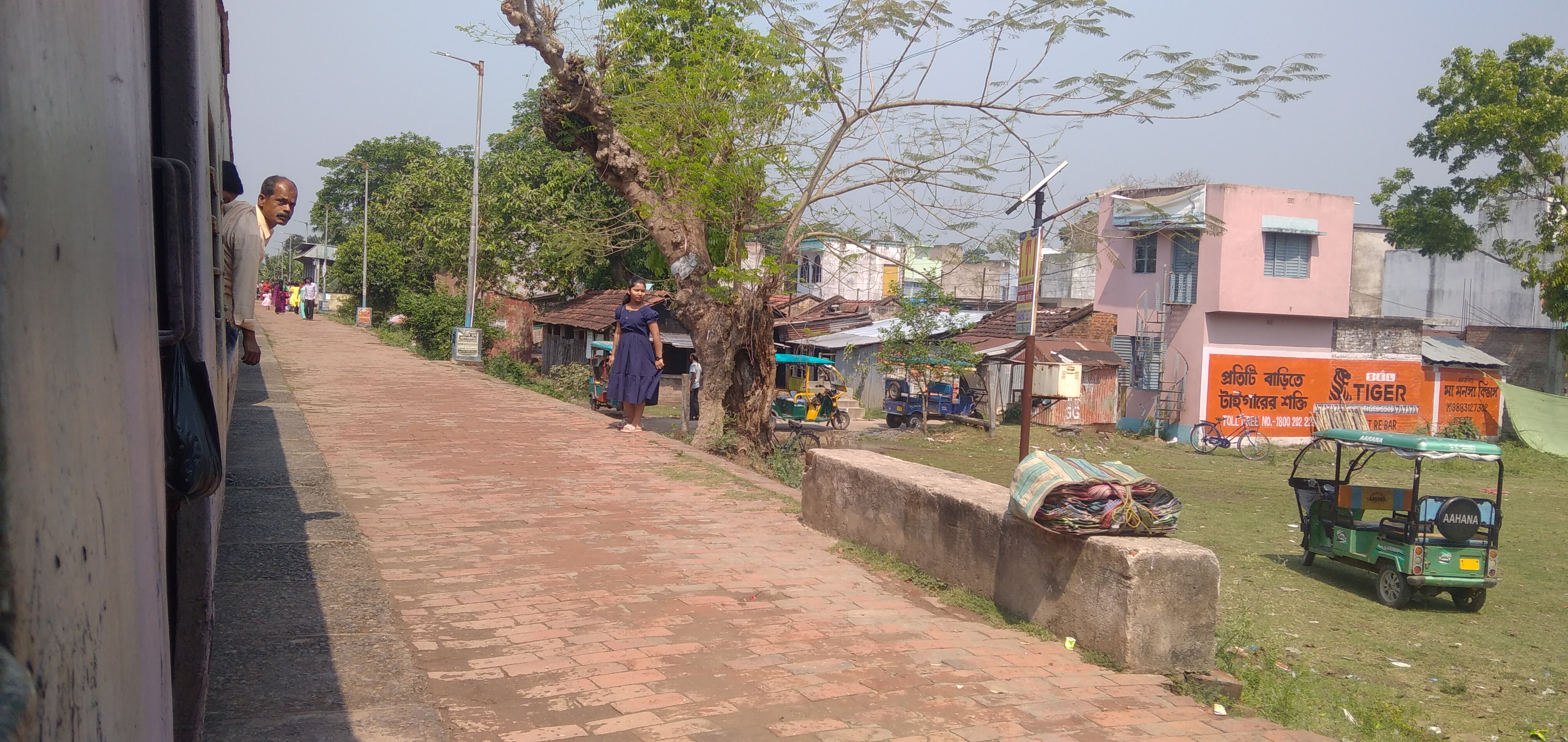

General information
- Location: Naba Raynagar, Nadia district, West Bengal; India
- Coordinates: 23.148331°N 88.604281°E
- Elevation: 14 metres (46 ft)
- System: Kolkata Suburban Railway station
- Owner: Indian Railways
- Operator: Eastern Railway
- Line: Sealdah–Hasnabad–Bangaon–Ranaghat line of Kolkata Suburban Railway
- Platforms: 1
- Tracks: 1

Construction
- Structure type: At grade
- Parking: Not available
- Cycle facilities: Not available

Other information
- Status: Functional
- Station code: NBRN
- Zone(s): Eastern Railway
- Division(s): Sealdah

History
- Opened: 1884; 142 years ago
- Electrified: 1972; 54 years ago

Services
Preceding station	Kolkata Suburban Railway	Following station
Gangnapur towards Bangaon Junction	Eastern Line Bangaon–Ranaghat line	Coopers Halt towards Ranaghat Junction
Route map
Location
- Location within West Bengal Location within India

Naba Raynagar railway station is part of the Kolkata Suburban Railway system and operated by Eastern Railway. It is located on the Bangaon–Ranaghat line in Nadia district in the Indian state of West Bengal.

== See also ==
- North 24 Parganas district
- Indian Railways
- Sealdah railway station
- Sealdah–Hasnabad–Bangaon–Ranaghat line
- Ranaghat Junction railway station
- List of railway stations in India
- Bangaon Junction railway station
