= Machhalandapur railway station =

Railway station in West Bengal, India

Machhalandapur
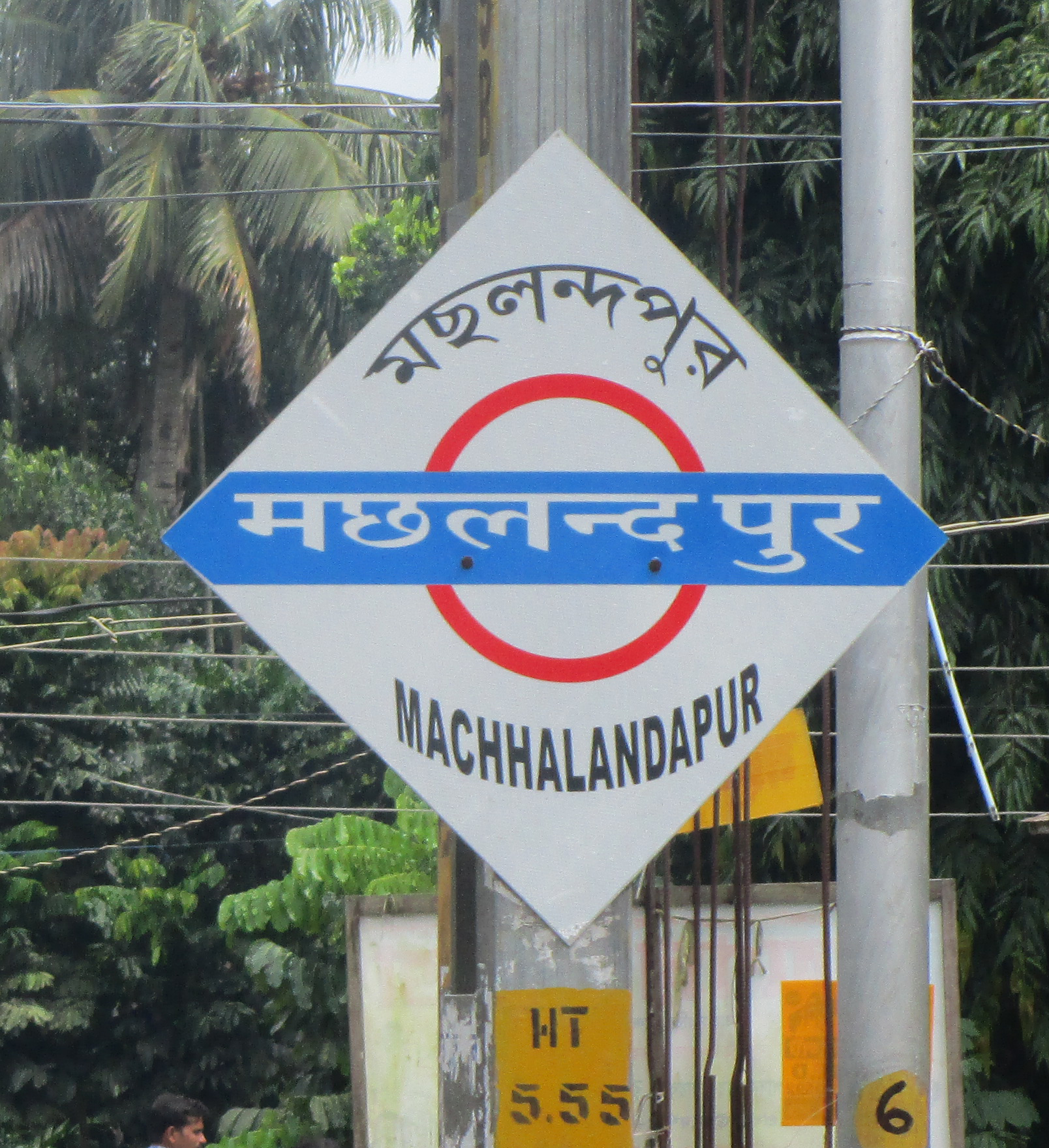
- Maslandapur railway station platform board

General information
- Location: Maslandapur, North 24 Parganas district, West Bengal; India
- Coordinates: 22.856562°N 88.744955°E
- Elevation: 9 metres (30 ft)
- System: Kolkata Suburban Railway station
- Owner: Indian Railways
- Operator: Eastern Railway
- Line: Sealdah–Hasnabad–Bangaon–Ranaghat line of Kolkata Suburban Railway
- Platforms: 2
- Tracks: 2

Construction
- Structure type: At grade
- Parking: No
- Cycle facilities: No

Other information
- Status: Functional
- Station code: MSL
- Zone(s): Eastern Railway
- Division(s): Sealdah

History
- Opened: 1906; 120 years ago
- Electrified: 1972; 54 years ago

Services
Preceding station	Kolkata Suburban Railway	Following station
Sanhati Halt towards Sealdah	Eastern Line Dum Dum–Bangaon branch line	Gobardanga towards Bangaon Junction
Route map
Location
- Location within West Bengal

Machhalandapur railway station is on the Sealdah–Bangaon branch line. It is 53.5 km from Sealdah and is part of the Kolkata Suburban Railway system.

Maslandapur, Nokpul, Sadpur and Betpuli form a cluster of census towns, south of Gobardanga. Machhalandapur railway station serves this cluster and villages beyond it.

== See also ==
- North 24 Parganas district
- Indian Railways
- Sealdah railway station
- Sealdah–Hasnabad–Bangaon–Ranaghat line
- Bangaon Junction railway station
- Transport in West Bengal
- List of railway stations in India
