= Bisharpara =

- Neighbourhood
- Location in West Bengal, India Bisharpara (West Bengal) Bisharpara (India)
- Coordinates: 22.6763°N 88.4319°E
- Country: India
- State: West Bengal
- Division: Presidency
- District: North 24 Parganas
- Metro Station: Birati (under construction)
- Railway Station: Bisharpara

Government
  - Type: Municipality
  - Body: North Dumdum Municipality

Languages
  - Official: Bengali, English
- Time zone: UTC+5:30 (IST)
- PIN: 700158
- Telephone code: +91 33
- Vehicle registration: WB
- Lok Sabha constituency: Dum Dum
- Vidhan Sabha constituency: Dum Dum Uttar

Bisharpara is a locality in North Dumdum of North 24 Parganas district in the state of West Bengal, India. It is a part of the area covered by Kolkata Metropolitan Development Authority (KMDA).

== Geography ==
=== Police station ===
Nimta police station under Barrackpore Police Commissionerate has jurisdiction over North Dum Dum Municipal areas.

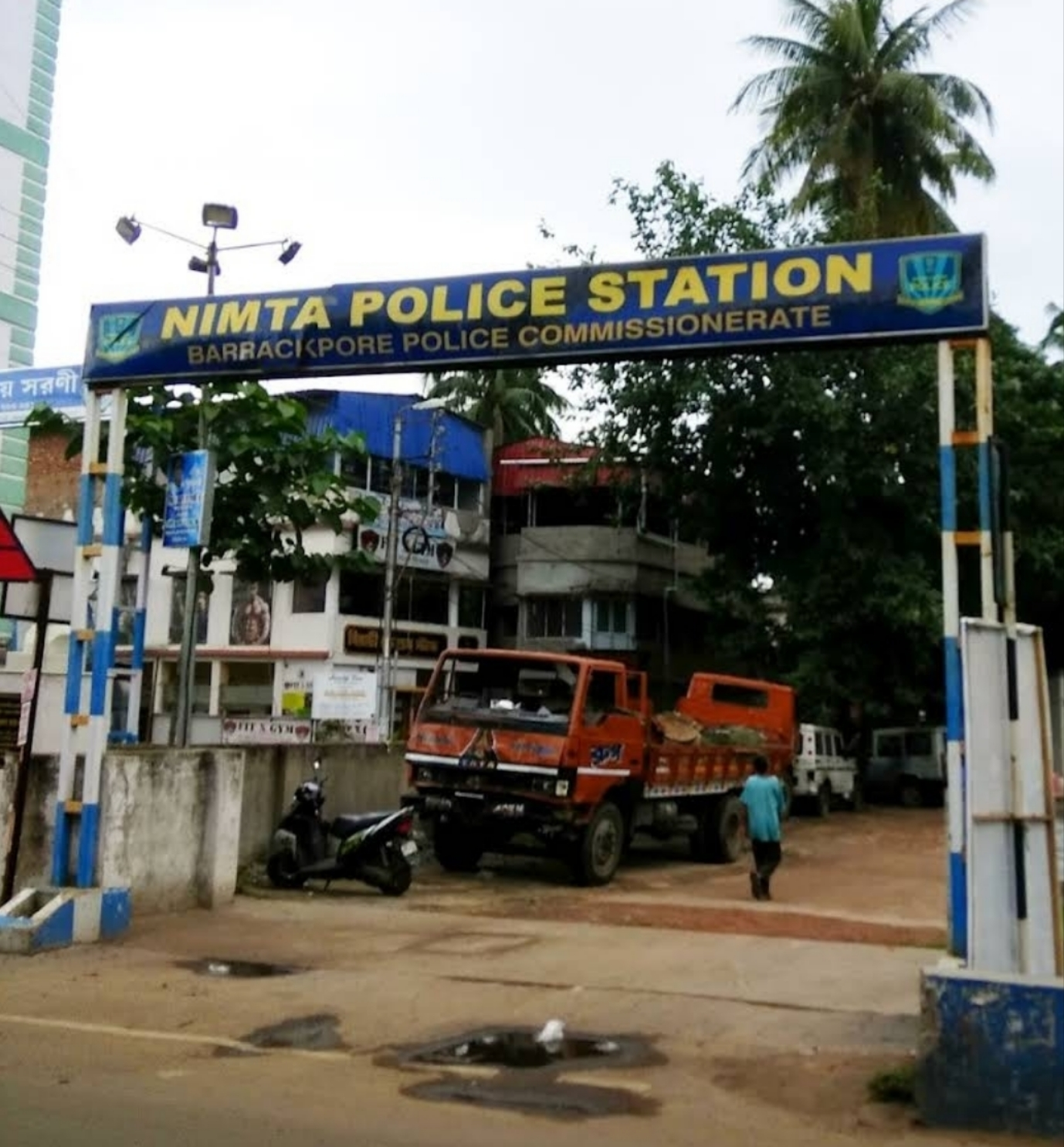
Nimta Police Station

Airport police station under Bidhannagar Police Commissionerate also has jurisdiction over North Dum Dum Municipal areas.

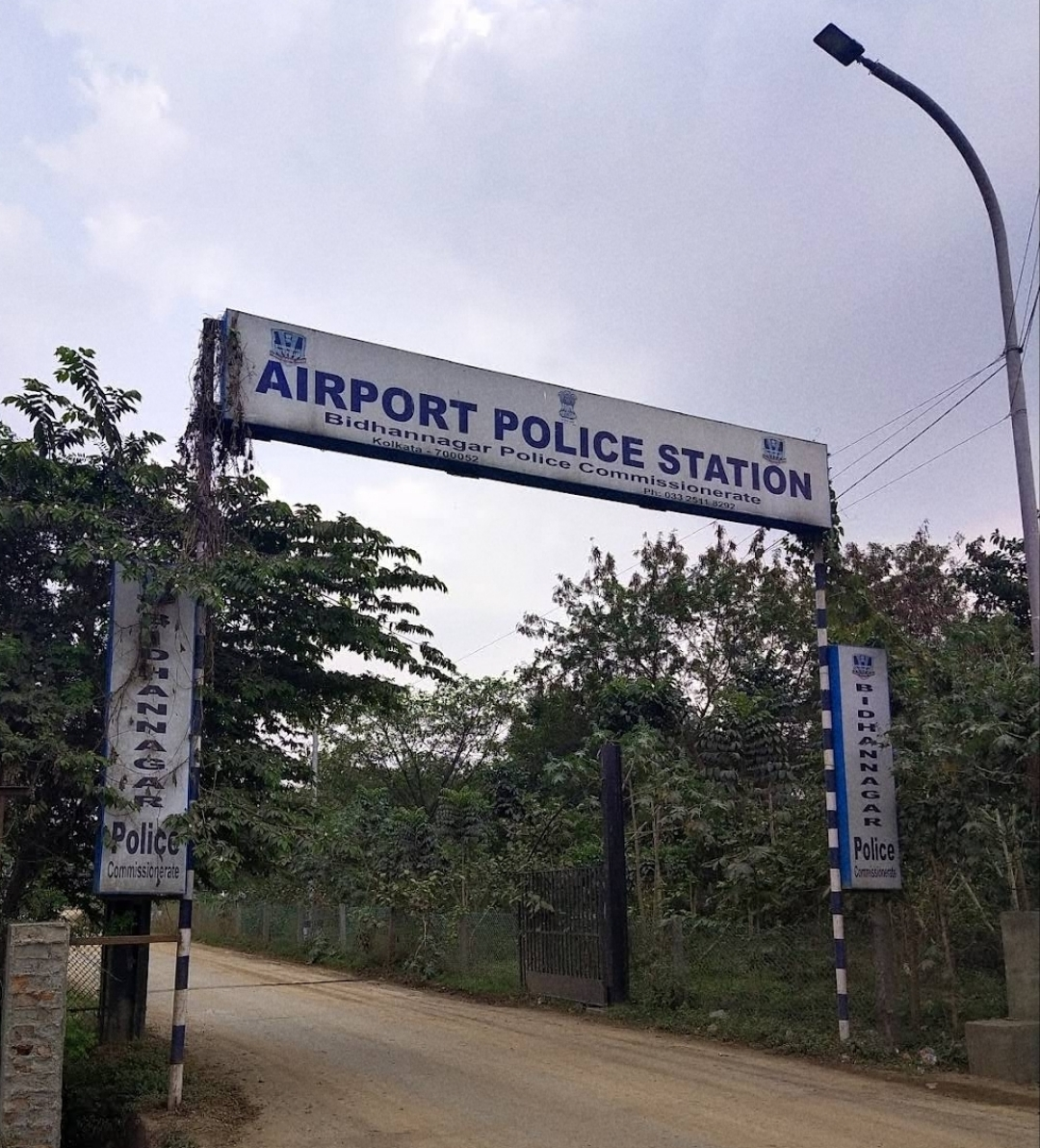
Airport Police Station

=== Post office ===
Bisharpara has a delivery sub post office, with PIN 700158 in the North Presidency Division of North 24 Parganas district in Calcutta region.
