= Gobardanga railway station =

Railway station in West Bengal, India

Gobardanga
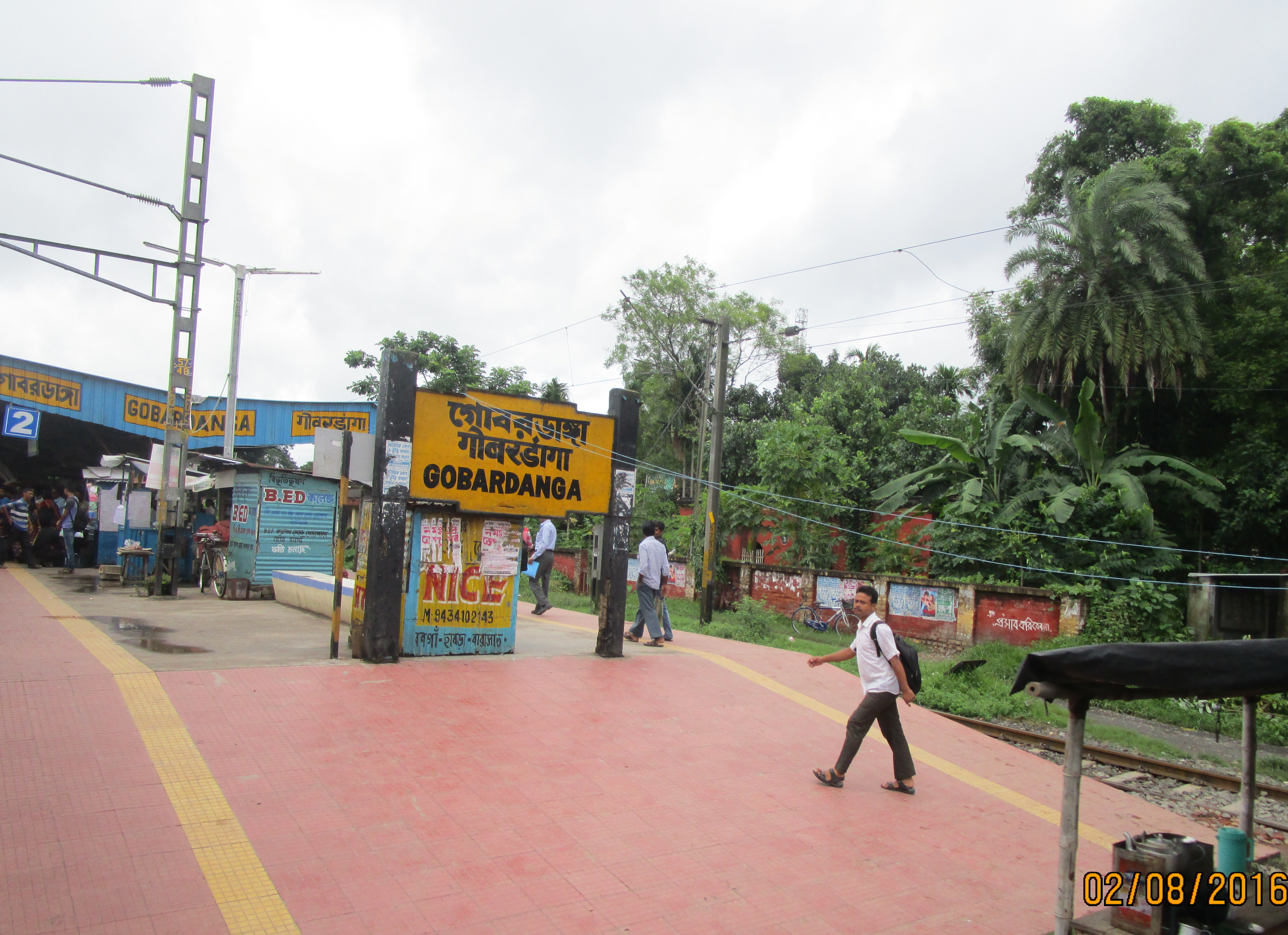
- Gobardanga railway station

General information
- Location: Gobardanga, North 24 Parganas district, West Bengal; India
- Coordinates: 22.880149°N 88.760791°E
- Elevation: 11 metres (36 ft)
- System: Kolkata Suburban Railway station
- Owner: Indian Railways
- Operator: Eastern Railway
- Line: Sealdah–Hasnabad–Bangaon–Ranaghat line of Kolkata Suburban Railway
- Platforms: 3
- Tracks: 3
- Bus routes: Habra-Chongda-Bergum-Nakpul-Gobardanga Kalibari-Gobardanga Kalitala-Gobardanga Station-Khantura-Tetulia

Construction
- Structure type: At grade
- Platform levels: 10 metres
- Parking: Available
- Cycle facilities: Available

Other information
- Status: Active
- Station code: GBG
- Zone(s): Eastern Railway
- Division(s): Sealdah

History
- Opened: 1906; 120 years ago
- Rebuilt: 2009; 17 years ago
- Electrified: 1972; 54 years ago

Passengers
- More than 100,000 daily

Services
| Preceding station | Kolkata Suburban Railway | Following station |
|---|---|---|
| Machhalandapur towards Sealdah | Eastern Line Dum Dum–Bangaon branch line | Thakurnagar towards Bangaon Junction |
Route map
Location
- Location within West Bengal Location within India

Gobardanga railway station is one of the oldest railway stations in North 24 Parganas district, West Bengal. Its code is GBG. It serves Gobardanga town. Its next Station towards Bangaon is Thakurnagar and its next Station towards Sealdah is Machhalandapur.

== Connectivity ==
Bangaon-Sealdah Local, Thakurnagar-Sealdah Local, Gobardanga-Sealdah Local connects it to Sealdah. Bangaon-Barasat Local connects it to various other stations up to Barasat. Bangaon-Majerhat and Bangaon-Canning connects it to Majerhat and Canning respectively. The Bandhan Express, which connects India with its neighbouring country Bangladesh, runs through the Station but does not stop here. It has always been a major railway between Habra and Bangaon.

== Station complex ==
The station consists of three platforms. All platforms are well sheltered. It has good facility of sanitation but lacks water.

== History ==
Gobardanga railway station is located on Sealdah–Hasnabad–Bangaon–Ranaghat line of Kolkata Suburban Railway. Link between Dum Dum to Khulna now in Bangladesh, via Bangaon was constructed by Bengal Central Railway Company in 1882–84. The Sealah–Dum Dum–Barasat–Ashok Nagar–Bangaon sector was electrified in 1963–64. It is a busy railway station. Its location close to many educational and cultural institutions makes it a significant place to visit between Habra and Bangaon. It was rebuilt in 2009.

== Station ==
| G | Exit/Entrance |
| Track 3 | Towards →Bangaon→→ |
| P3 | FOB, Island platform, No-3 doors will open on the left/right |
| P2 | FOB, Island platform, No-2 doors will open on the left/right |
| Track 2 | Towards←←Sealdah← |
| Track 1 | Towards ←←Sealdah← |
| P1 | FOB, Side platform, No-1 doors will open the left/right |
| G | Exit/Entrance & Ticket counter |

== See also ==
- North 24 Parganas district
- Indian Railways
- Sealdah railway station
- Sealdah–Hasnabad–Bangaon–Ranaghat line
- Bangaon Junction railway station
- Transport in West Bengal
- List of railway stations in India
