= Char Jadubati =

Village in West Bengal, India

Coordinates: 22°59′38″N 88°25′09″E

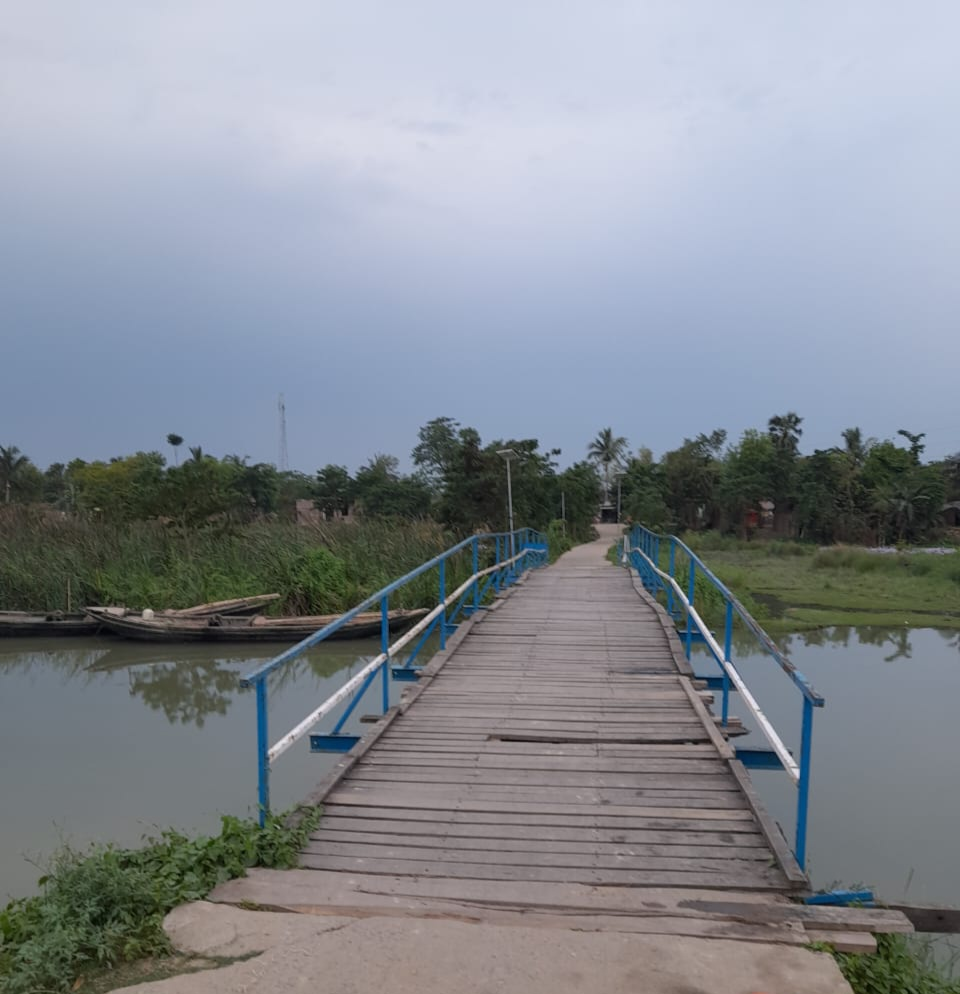
Wooden bridge at Char Jadubati over Jamuna River (West Bengal).

Map showing location of Char Jadubati.

Char Jadubati is a village in Nadia district, West Bengal, India, on the banks of River Hooghly. According to Census 2011, Char Jadubati village has population of 1777, of which 930 are males and 847 are females.The pincode of Char Jadubati is 741251.
