= Michael Nagar =

- Neighbourhood
- Location in West Bengal, India Michael Nagar (West Bengal) Michael Nagar (India)
- Coordinates: 22.6764°N 88.4420°E
- Country: India
- State: West Bengal
- Division: Presidency
- District: North 24 Parganas
- Metro Station: Michael Nagar (under construction)
- Railway Station: Bisharpara

Government
  - Type: Municipality
  - Body: Madhyamgram Municipality

Languages
  - Official: Bengali, English
- Time zone: UTC+5:30 (IST)
- PIN: 700133
- Telephone code: +91 33
- Vehicle registration: WB
- Lok Sabha constituency: Barasat
- Vidhan Sabha constituency: Madhyamgram

Michael Nagar is a neighbourhood under Madhyamgram municipality of North 24 Parganas district in the state of West Bengal, India. It is a part of the area covered by Kolkata Metropolitan Development Authority (KMDA).

== Geography ==
=== Police station ===
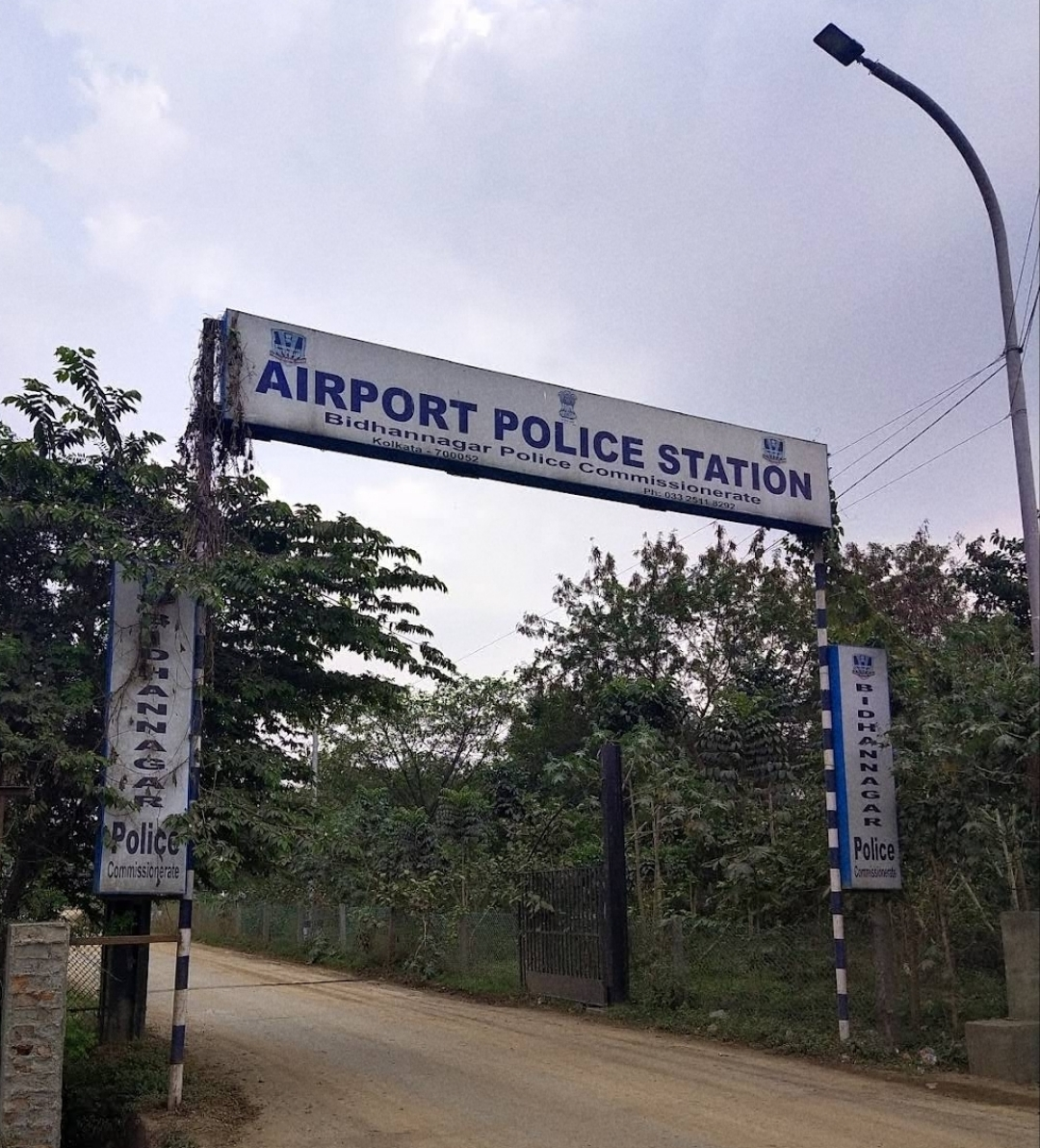
Airport Police Station

Airport police station under Bidhannagar Police Commissionerate also has jurisdiction over Michael Nagar areas.

=== Post office ===
Michael Nagar has a delivery sub post office, with PIN 700133 in the North Presidency Division of North 24 Parganas district in Calcutta region.
