= Akaipur =

- Village
- Location in West Bengal, India Akaipur (India)
- Coordinates: 23.095306°N 88.717145°E
- Country: India
- State: West Bengal
- District: North 24 Parganas

Population (2011)
  - Total: 2,979

Languages
  - Official: Bengali, English
- Time zone: UTC+5:30 (IST)
- PIN: 743710 (Akaipur)
- Telephone/STD code: 03215
- Lok Sabha constituency: Bangaon
- Vidhan Sabha constituency: Bangaon Uttar
- Website: north24parganas.nic.in

Akaipur is a village and a gram panchayat in the Bangaon CD block in the Bangaon subdivision of the North 24 Parganas district in the state of West Bengal, India.

== Demographics ==
According to the 2011 Census of India, Akaipur had a total population of 2,979, of which 1,522 were males and 1,457 were females.

== See also ==
- Akaipur railway station
