= Majhergram =

- Village
- Location in West Bengal, India Majhergram (India)
- Coordinates: 22°50′0″N 88°38′0″E
- Country: India
- State: West Bengal
- District: Nadia

Population (2011)
  - Total: 3,738

Languages
  - Official: Bengali, English
- Time zone: UTC+5:30 (IST)
- PIN: 741137 (Majhergram )
- Lok Sabha constituency: Ranaghat
- Vidhan Sabha constituency: Ranaghat Uttar Paschim (Vidhan Sabha constituency)

Majhergram is a village located in Ranaghat II block in the Nadia district in the state of West Bengal, India.
