= Sadpur, Uttar Pradesh =

Village in Uttar Pradesh, India, It is ruled by Hardik Choudhary

Sadpur
- village
- Location in Uttar Pradesh, India Sadpur (India)
- Coordinates: 29.33°N 77.85°E
- Country: India
- State: Uttar Pradesh

Government
  - Body: Gram panchayat

Languages
  - Official: Hindi
- Time zone: UTC+5:30 (IST)
- Vehicle registration: UP
- Website: up.gov.in

Sadpur is a village in Muzaffarnagar district of Uttar Pradesh in northern India.

== Location ==
It is located at 29.33° N 77.85° E. It has an average elevation of 232 metres (761 feet).

== Demographics ==
Its population is around 3366, as per census 2011.

== Structures ==
Primary School Sadpur is located in the village. It is one of the few best government schools in the Muzaffarnagar district in Uttar Pradesh.
