= Jamuna River (West Bengal) =

Coordinates: 26°06′N 92°45′E

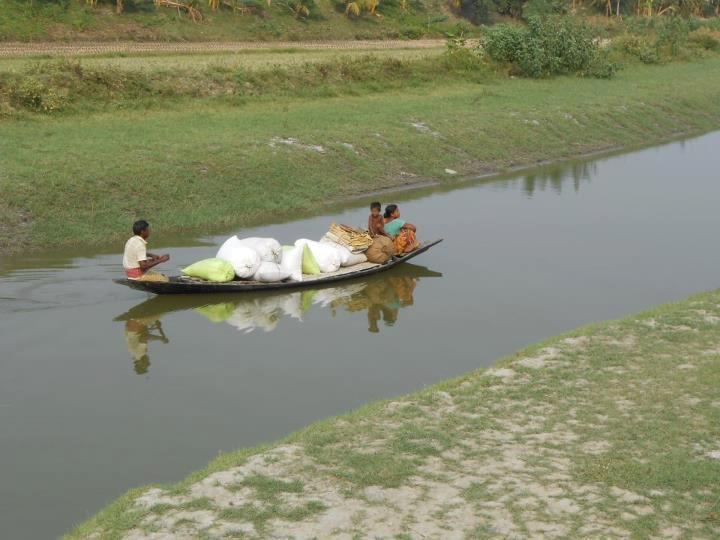
- River Jamuna at Charghat

Location
- Country: India
- State: West Bengal
- District: North 24 Parganas, Nadia

Physical characteristics
- Source: Char Jadubati, Hooghly River
  - location: West Bengal, India
  - coordinates: 22.990568,88.409563
- Mouth: Ichamati River
  - location: West Bengal, India

Jamuna River (West Bengal)

The Jamuna River is a tributary of the Ichamati River. It originates from the Hoogly River at Char Jadubati, opposite Tribeni, and flows through the Nadia and North 24 Parganas districts of West Bengal, where it merges with the Ichamati River.

== History and origin ==
The Jamuna River was originally a tributary of the Hooghly River. At Tribeni in Hooghly district, the Hooghly split into the Saraswati River and the Jamuna River. Over time, silt accumulation caused the Jamuna to become a separate river.

The river now originates near the Haringhata Farm in the southern Nadia district. It is characterized by sharp bends and meandering courses, flowing through places such as Kalyani, Madanpur, Birohi, Haringhata, Gaighata, Gobardanga, Machlandapur and Charghat before merging with the Ichamati River.

In the Middle Ages, the Jamuna was one of the largest rivers in the region and was described by local poets as such.
