= Gobardanga Hindu College =

General degree college in India

Coordinates: 22°52′51.71″N 88°45′12.96″E

- Type: Undergraduate college
- Established: 1947
- Affiliations: West Bengal State University
- Principal: Dr. Harekrishna Mondal
- Location: Gobardanga, West Bengal, India
- Campus: Urban
- Website: Gobardanga Hindu College

- Location within West Bengal Location within India

Gobardanga Hindu College, established in 1947, is a general degree college in Gobardanga, West Bengal, India. It offers undergraduate courses in arts, commerce, and sciences, as well as postgraduate courses in arts. It is affiliated with West Bengal State University (formerly affiliated with University of Calcutta). In 2024, it was reaccredited with an A grade A by the National Assessment and Accreditation Council (NAAC). It is currently the only college in North 24 Parganas to receive an A grade for the third successive time.

== History ==
The college formally began operating on 27 November 1947, with departments in English, Bengali, Sanskrit, History, Logic, Elements of Civics and Economics, Mathematics, Commerce, Chemistry, Physics, and Biology up to the I.Sc. Standard. It had 105 students and 4 full-time teachers. BA and B.Sc courses were introduced in 1950 and 1952, respectively. NCC was introduced in the College in 1956, with three teachers—Niren Bandopadhyay, Sachindra Mohan Mukhopadhyay, and Ambarnath Ghoshal—attending Fort William to learn about the NCC. Bengali Honours was added to the curriculum in 1957, and the Department of B.Ed was established on 1 July 1962. Recognizing the importance of career-oriented courses, the Department of Travel and Tourism Management was introduced in 1998. In 2005, the college was accredited with grade A by the National Assessment and Accreditation Council. General courses in Botany, Zoology, Geography, Music, Journalism and Mass Communication, Computer Science, and Physical Education, as well as general courses in Sociology and Anthropology, were introduced in 2012 and 2013, respectively. In 2024, it was reaccredited with an A grade by the National Assessment and Accreditation Council (NAAC) for the third successive time. Honours courses in Anthropology, Botany, Zoology, Computer Science, Geography, Music, and Journalism and Mass Communication were introduced in 2018.

== Departments ==
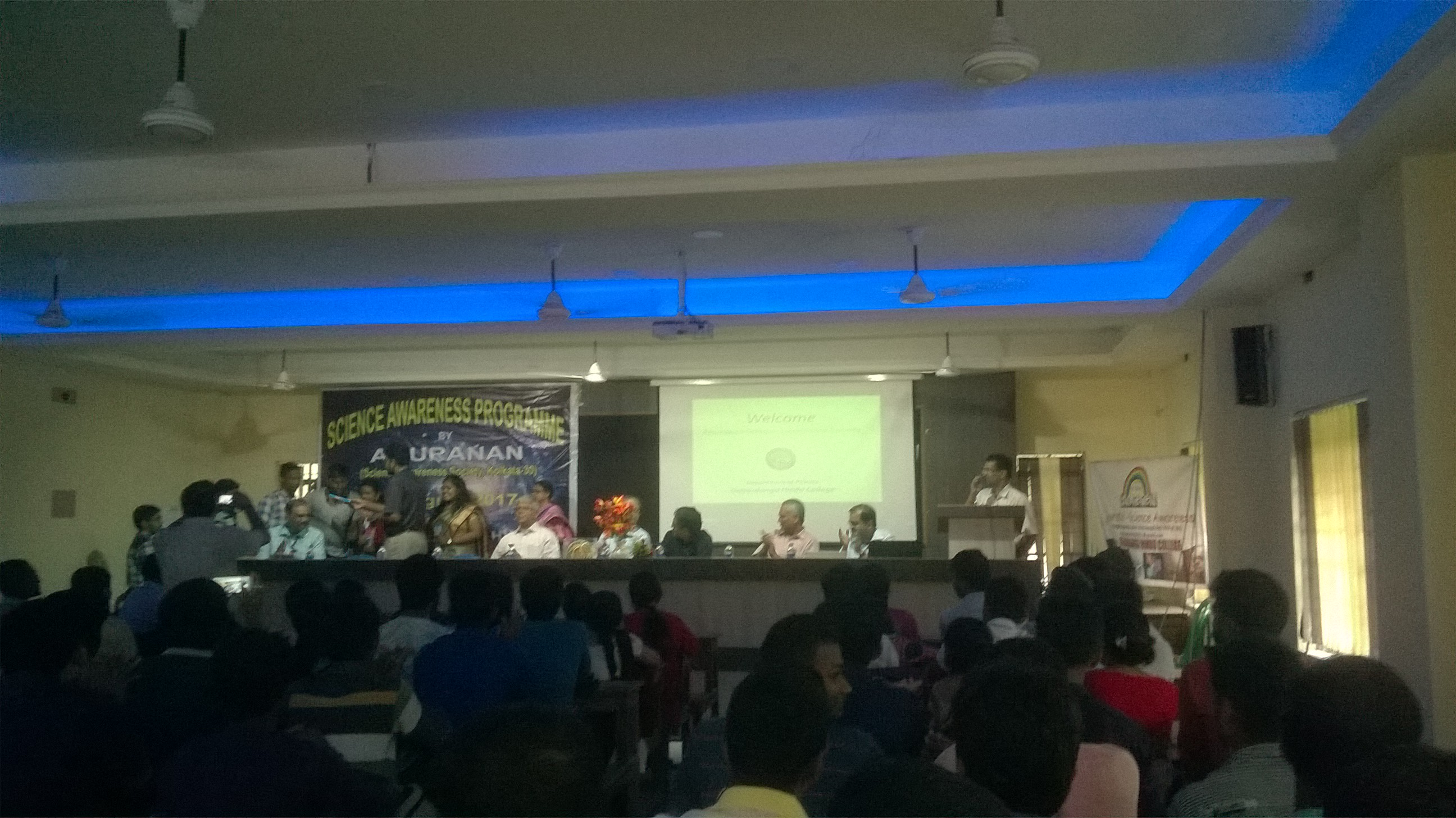
A science program by anuranan, Gobardanga Hindu College

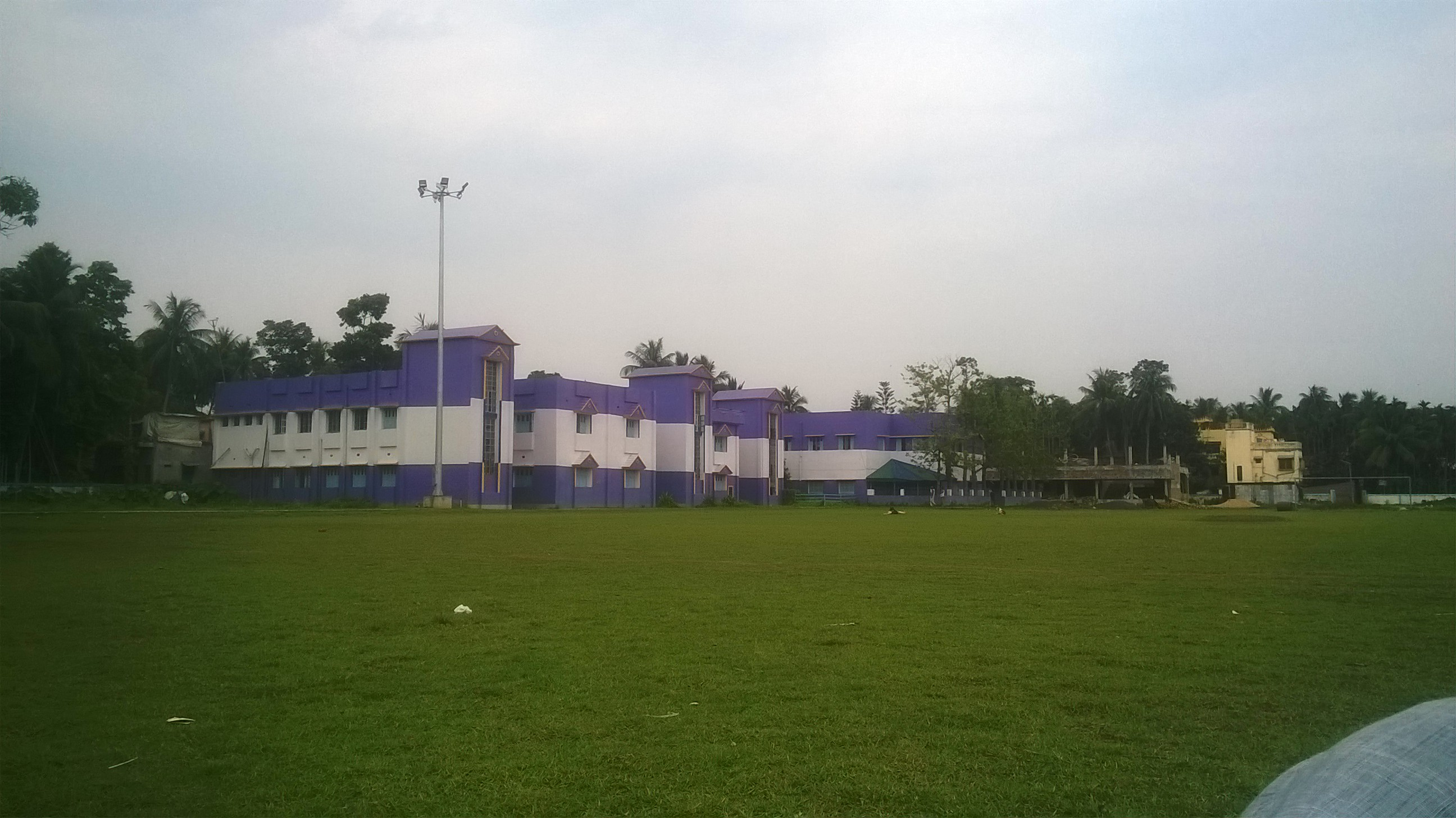
Gobardanga Hindu College- B.ED college

=== Arts and Commerce ===
- Bengali
- English
- History
- Political Science
- Philosophy
- Sanskrit
- Geography
- Philosophy
- Physical education
- Music
- Economics
- Accountancy
- Education

=== Science ===
- Mathematics
- Physics
- Chemistry
- Botany
- Zoology
- Anthropology

=== Post Graduation ===
- Bengali
- History
- Education

=== Career-oriented courses ===
- Tourism & Travel Management
- Journalism & Mass Communication

== Accreditation ==
Gobardanga Hindu College is recognized by the University Grants Commission (UGC). It was accredited by the National Assessment and Accreditation Council (NAAC), which awarded the college an A grade.

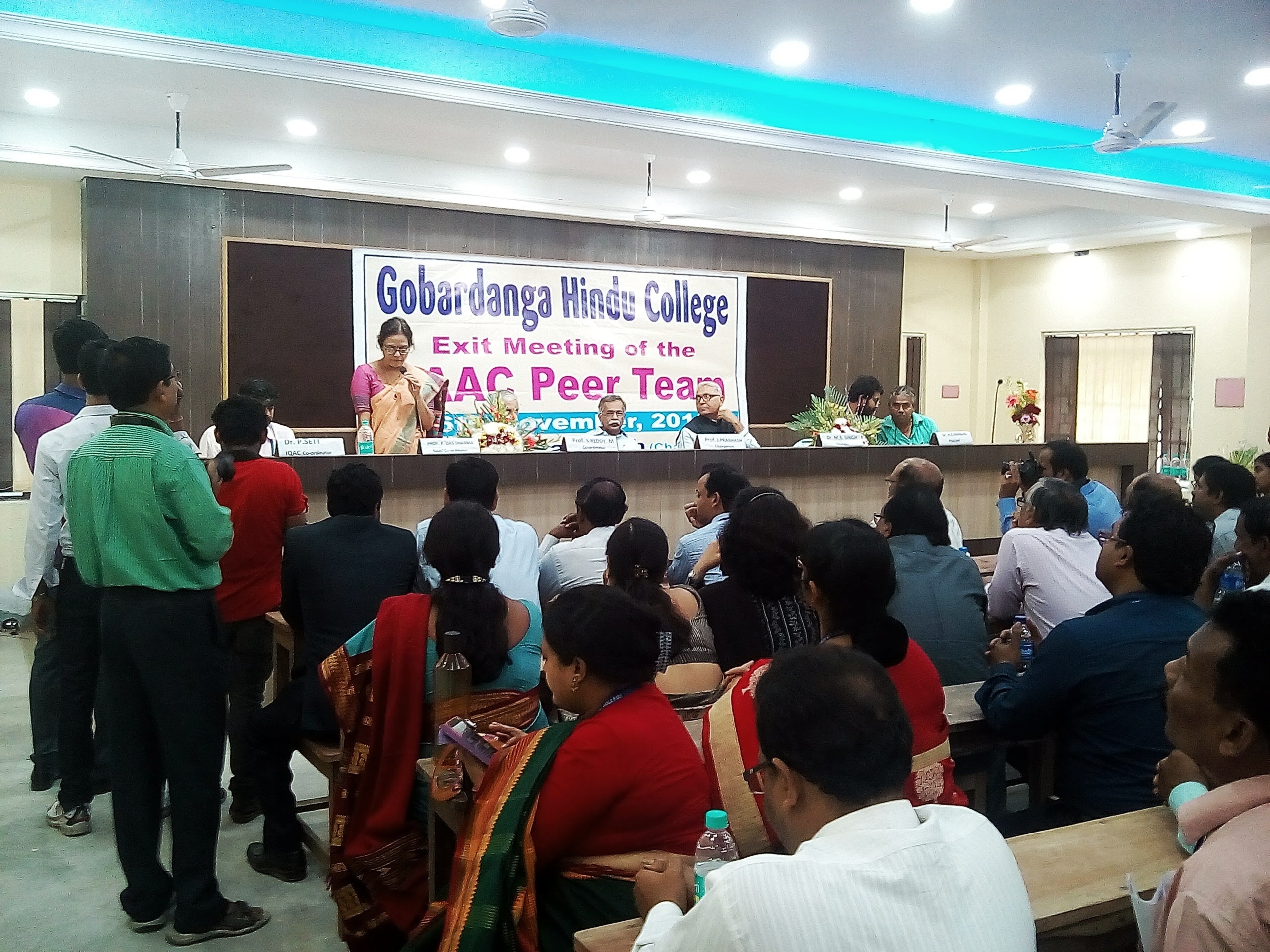
Exit meeting of the NAAC Peer team in 2016.

== Facilities ==
- Radio-frequency identification (RFID) enabled advanced library
- The library has a collection of approximately 35,000 documents, including books, serials, and non-book materials, and subscribes to ten printed periodicals.
- Reading room with air conditioning and desktop access
- Open library access.
- Sound system-equipped classrooms
- Virtual and smart classrooms
- Scholarship for students achieving first class (60%) in the university examination
- Free studentships for economically disadvantaged students
- Regular online feedback system
- One boys' hostel and two well-decorated women's hostels
- Bus service
- Gymnasium

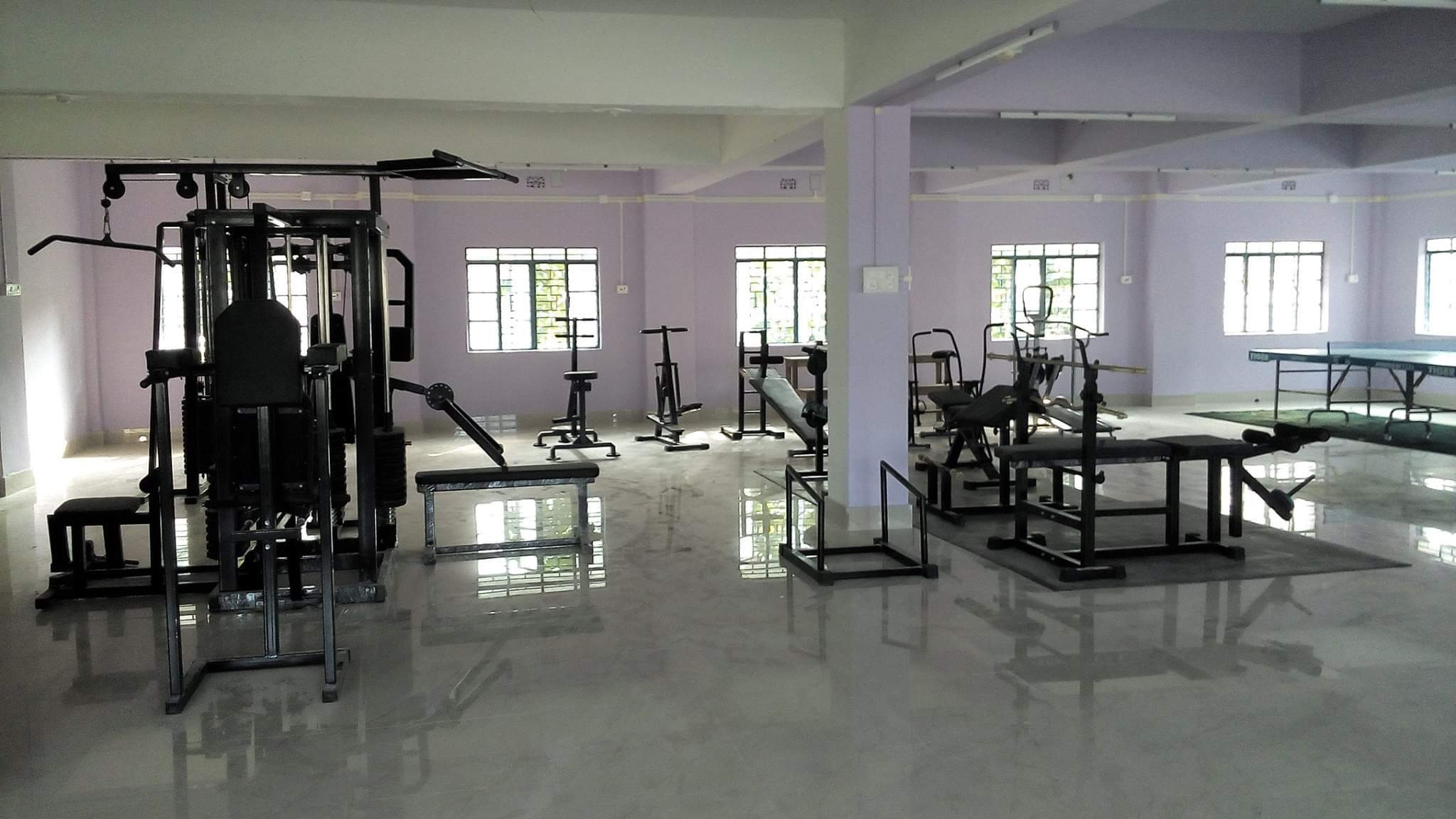
Gymnasium of Gobardanga Hindu College

- Students' canteen
- WiFi access
- Purified drinking water
- History Museum

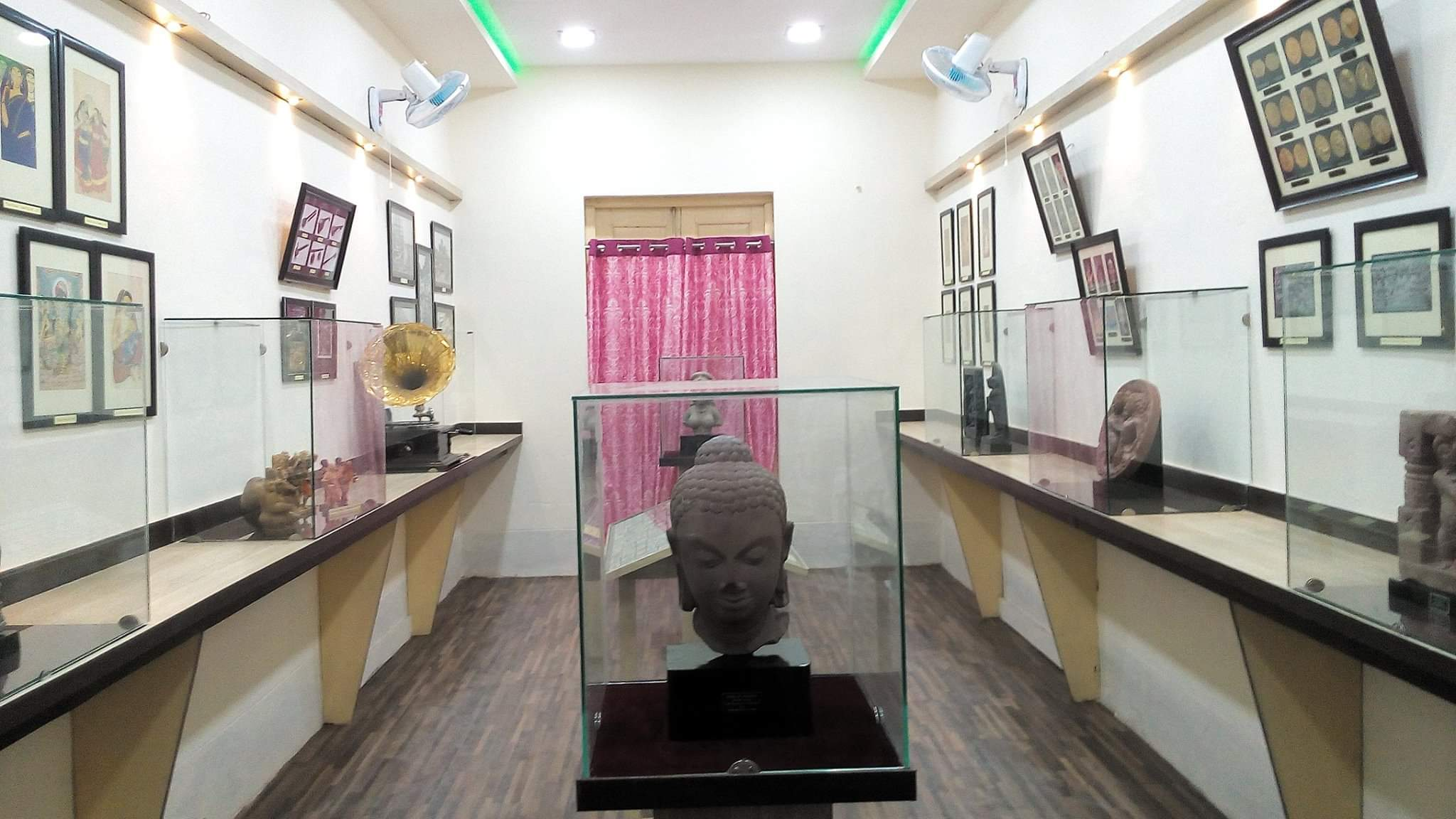
Gobardanga Hindu College History Museum

== Exhibition, annual sports and cultural competition ==
An exhibition is held annually on the college premises, featuring models prepared by students under the guidance of their teachers. All departments participate, with temporary stalls built to display exhibits from each department. Annual sports and cultural competitions are also held to allow students to showcase their skills.

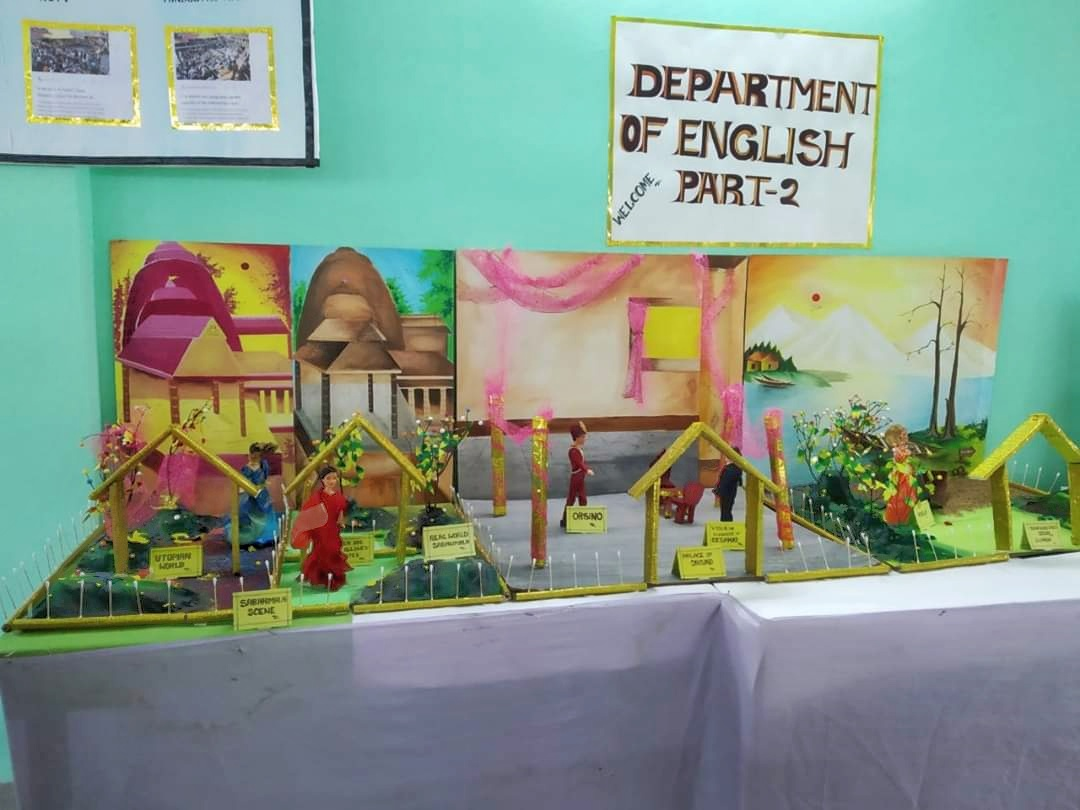
Name of The Model- Shakespeare's "Twelfth Night" in the context of Contemporary Society.

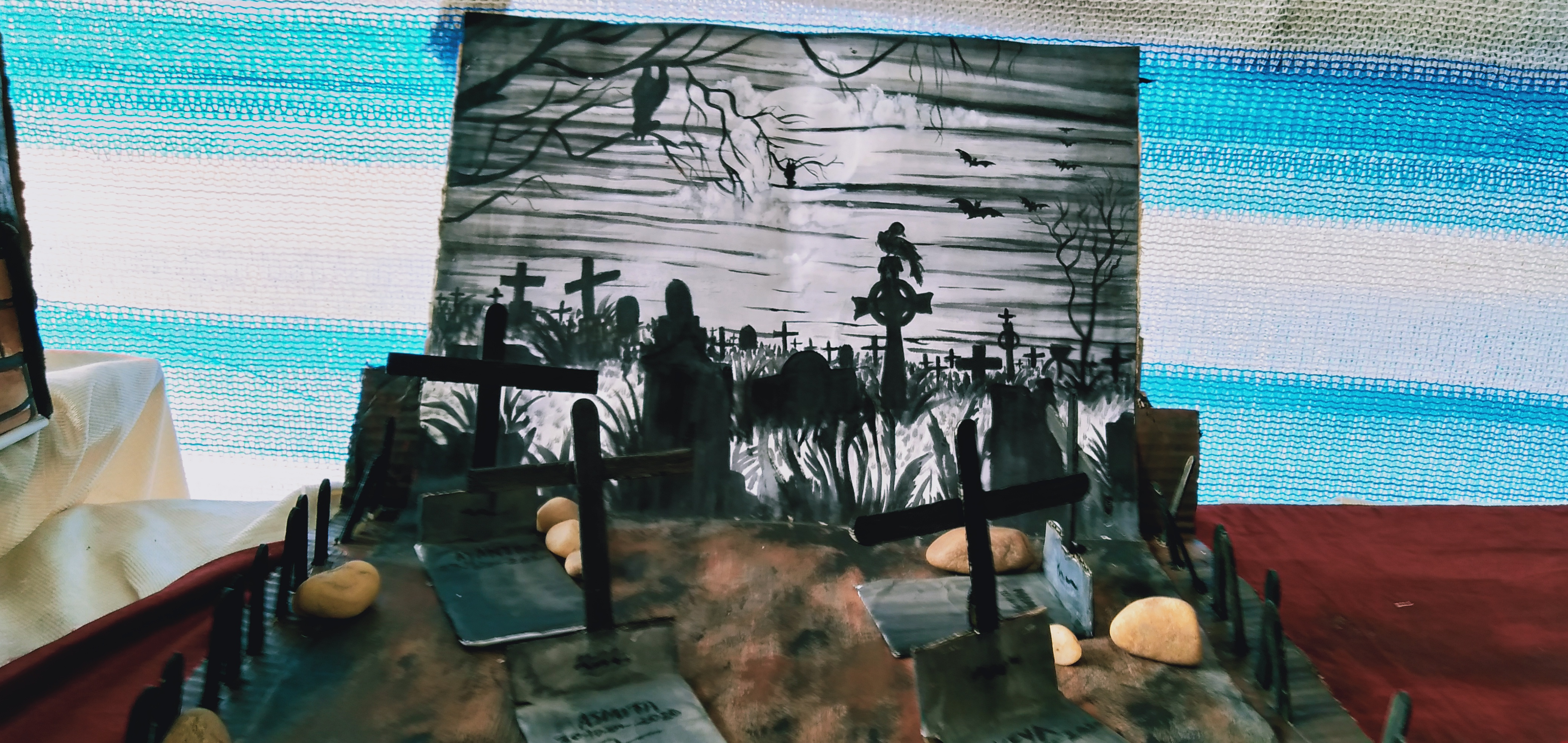
Name of the Model- Graveyard School of Poetry.

== See also ==
- Education in India
- List of colleges in West Bengal
- Education in West Bengal
