= Gobardanga =

Town in West Bengal, India

- Town
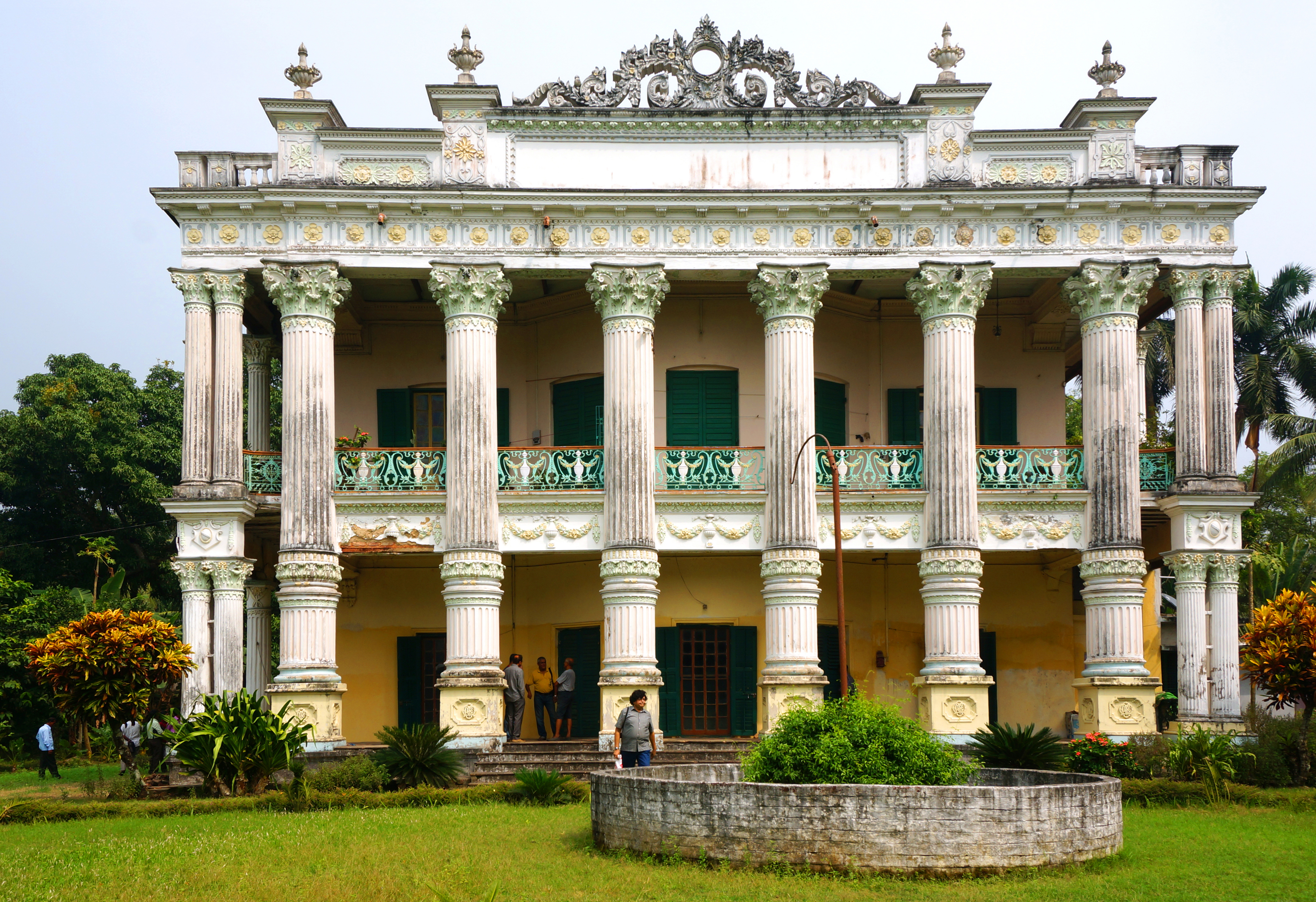
- Gobardanga Zamindar House

- Location in West Bengal, India Gobardanga (India)
- Coordinates: 22.87°N 88.76°E
- Country: India
- State: West Bengal
- District: North 24 Parganas

Government
  - Type: Municipality
  - Body: Gobardanga Municipality
  - Municipality Chairman: Sankar Dutta

Area
  - Total: 13.50 km^{2} (5.21 sq mi)
- Elevation: 6 m (20 ft)

Population (2011)
  - Total: 45,377
  - Density: 3,361/km^{2} (8,706/sq mi)

Languages
  - Official: Bengali and English
- Time zone: UTC+5:30 (IST)
- Lok Sabha constituency: Bangaon
- Vidhan Sabha constituency: Gaighata
- Website: www.gobardangamunicipality.org

Gobardanga is a Town and a Municipality in Barasat sadar subdivision of North 24 Parganas district in the Indian state of West Bengal. Founded on 20 April 1870, it is one of the oldest municipalities of West Bengal.

== Etymology ==
The word Gobardanga derives from Sanskrit. It consists of three words, go-bar-danga. Go means "world/earth", bar means "greatest" and danga refers to "place" which literally means, the greatest place on earth.

== Geography ==
Cities, towns and locations in Barasat subdivision, North 24 Parganas
M: municipal town, CT: census town, R: rural/ urban centre, H: historical centre
Owing to space constraints in the small map, the actual locations in a larger map may vary slightly

=== Location ===
Gobardanga is situated on the banks of the river Jamuna. It is located 22.880149°N and 88.760791°E in the district of North 24 parganas of West Bengal.

There is a horse bow lake named Kankona Baorh at Media, Gobardanga. It is an open mouthed bangle shaped water body. The lake resembles a Kankon, worn by ladies hence it is being named Kankona Baorh. Migratory birds come here in the winter time.

=== Area overview ===
The area covered in the map alongside is largely a part of the north Bidyadhari Plain. located in the lower Ganges Delta. The country is flat. It is a little raised above flood level and the highest ground borders the river channels. 54.67% of the people of the densely populated area lives in the urban areas and 45.33% lives in the rural areas.

Note: The map alongside presents some of the notable locations in the subdivision. All places marked in the map are linked in the larger full screen map.

== History ==
It has a wide prevailing history. Gobardanga had been governed by Brahmin Zamindars of bharadwaj gotra in pre-old days. Their descendants still reside in their ancestral home and maintaining all regulations, worship Goddess Durga as per their tradition during the Durga Puja days. Close to it is the Gobardanga Prasannomoyee Kali Mandir. Established by then Zamindar Kaliprassana Mukhopaddhyay, the temple faced southwards has Goddess Kali along with 12 other shrines of Lord Shiva distributed into 6 shrines on either side of the temple. According to certain theories and statements, Rani Rani Rashmoni, founder of Dakshineshwar Kali temple, Dakshineshwar, Kolkata, had once travelled down the Jamuna river and reached Gobardanga and came across the temple, from which she got the idea of constructing the Dakshineshwar Kali temple along with 12 other shrines of Lord Shiva. This temple is quite popular and people from nearby and far away areas often visit this temple for their prayers.

== Transport ==
Gobardanga railway station is 58 km from Sealdah railway station on the Sealdah–Bangaon branch line of Eastern Railway. From Sealdah it is next to Maslandapur railway station and before Thakurnagar railway station. Road distance between Bongaon and Gobardanga is almost 25 km. Buses, Auto-rickshaw, Electric rickshaw are the most commonly used mode of transport.

== Demographics ==
As per the 2011 Census of India, Gobardanga had a total population of 45,377, of which 23,025 (51%) were males and 22,352 (49%) were females. Population below 6 years was 3,481. The total number of literates in Gobardanga was 38,461 (91.80% of the population over 6 years).

As of 2001 India census, Gobardanga had a population of 41,618. Males constitute 51% of the population and females 49%. Gobardanga has an average literacy rate of 80%, higher than the national average of 59.5%: male literacy is 84%, and female literacy is 75%. In Gobardanga, 9% of the population is under 6 years of age.

== Education ==
=== Higher education ===
Gobardanga has a degree college named Gobardanga Hindu College which is affiliated with West Bengal State University. It also has a B.Ed college within the campus.

=== School Education ===
- Gobardanga Khantura High School
- Khantura Girls' High School
- Gobardanga Sri Chaitanya Vidyalaya
- Khantura Pritilata Shikskha Niketan for Boys
- Khantura Pritilata Shikskha Niketan for Girls
- Netaji Vidyapith
- Gobardanga Collegiate High School
- Gobardanga Girls High School
- DPB Deshbandhu Prathamik Vidyalaya
- Khantura Pritilata Shishu Shiksha Niketan
- Oxebow English School
- Subhash Vidyamandir FP School
- Sri Ramakrishna Vidyabhawan
- Sudhir Memorial Institute
- Angel Day School
- NIVEDITA SHISHU TIRTHA

== Recreation ==
Gobardanga has a park named 'Kankana park', trivially called 'Coacher Bagan'.

== Notable residents ==
- Pramatha Nath Bose, Geologist and Paleontologist
- Prabhavathi Devi Saraswathi, Bengali writer and novelist.

== Healthcare ==
North 24 Parganas district has been identified as one of the areas where ground water is affected by arsenic contamination.

== See also ==
Map of Habra I CD Block on Page 289 of District Census Handbook. It also shows the location of Gobardanga.
