= Bangaon Junction railway station =

Railway Station in West Bengal, India

Bangaon Junction
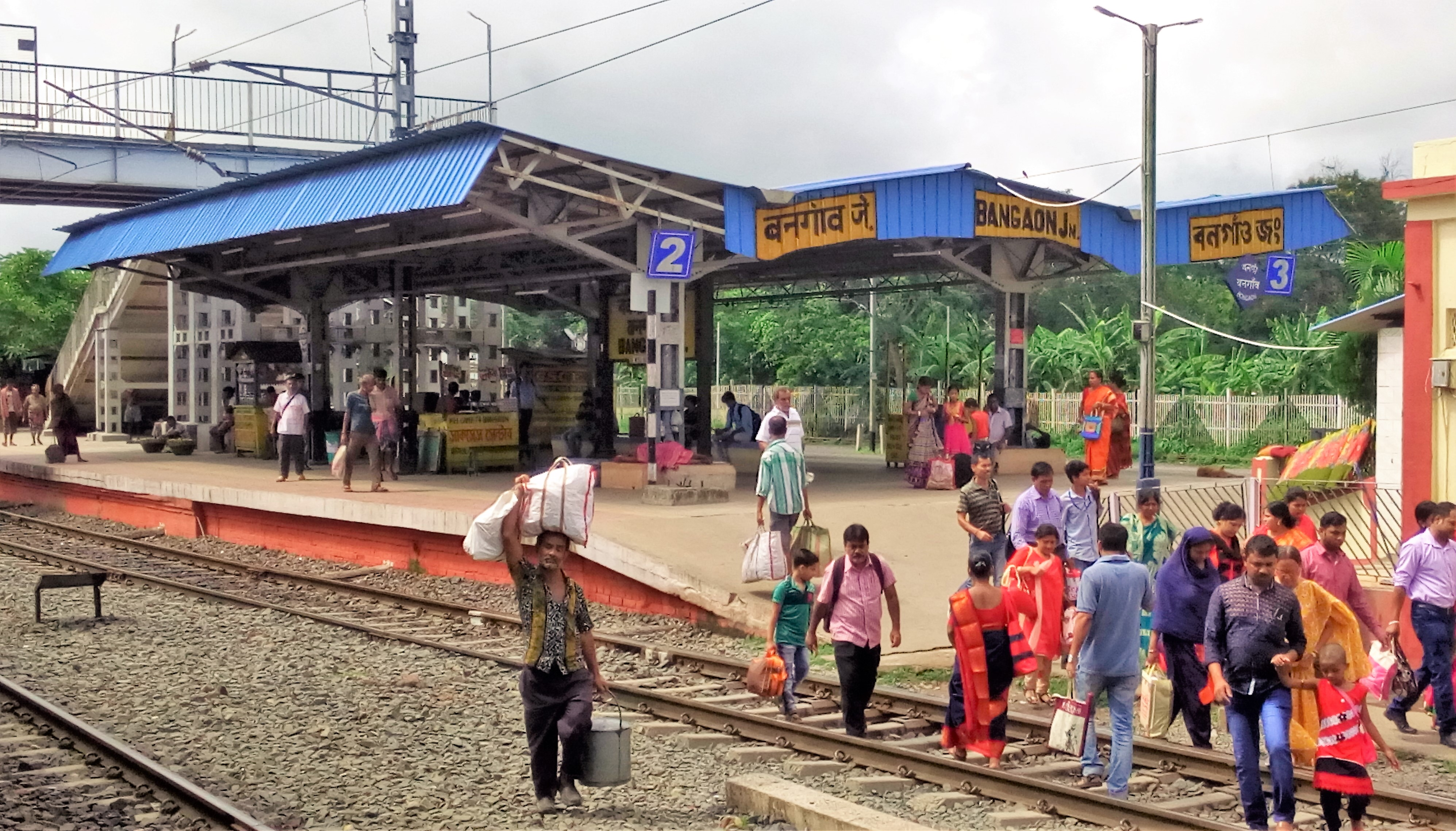

General information
- Location: Station Road, Bangaon, West Bengal, 743235; India
- Coordinates: 23°01′49″N 88°49′59″E
- Elevation: 11 metres (36 ft)
- System: Kolkata Suburban Railway
- Owner: Indian Railways
- Operator: Eastern Railway
- Lines: Sealdah–Bangaon line Ranaghat–Bangaon section
- Platforms: 3
- Tracks: 6
- Bus stands: Motigunj bus stand; 78/ Dakshineshwar bus stand
- Connections: Bangaon–Boyra–Duttapulia bus route; Bongaon–Basirhat bus route; Bongaon–Dakshineswar bus; Bongaon–Chakdaha bus route

Construction
- Structure type: Standard (on ground station)
- Parking: No
- Cycle facilities: No

Other information
- Status: Active
- Station code: BNJ
- Zone(s): Eastern
- Division(s): Sealdah

History
- Opened: 1884; 142 years ago
- Electrified: 1963–1964; 62 years ago with 25 kV overhead line

Services
Preceding station	Kolkata Suburban Railway	Following station
Bibhuti Bhushan Halt towards Sealdah	Eastern Line Sealdah–Bangaon line	Terminus
Terminus	Eastern Line Ranaghat–Bangaon line	Satberia towards Ranaghat Junction
Route map
Location
- Location within West Bengal Location within India

Bangaon Junction is a Kolkata Suburban Railway junction station on the Sealdah–Bangaon line and Ranaghat–Bangaon line. It is located in North 24 Parganas district in the Indian state of West Bengal. It serves Bangaon and its surrounding areas.

== History ==
In 1882–84 the Bengal Central Railway Company constructed two lines: one from Dum Dum to Khulna, now in Bangladesh, via Bangaon and the other linking Ranaghat and Bangaon.

The Bengal Central Railway was formed in 1881 to construct and operate a line to Khulna. It was merged with Eastern Bengal Railway in 1903.

Dum Dum–Barasat–Ashoknagar–Habra–Gobardanga–Bangaon sector was electrified in 1963–64.

=== Redevelopment ===
In 2024, Ministry of Railways allocated ₹29.54 crore (US$3.1 million) for the redevelopment purpose of this station under the Amrit Bharat Station Scheme. After the redevelopment, the station will have a new aesthetically designed building, equipped with modern amenities like free Wi-Fi, drinking water facilities, upgraded toilets, more comfortable sitting chairs, AC Waiting rooms and escalators etc.

== Routes ==
In North line commuter trains run up to Ranaghat Jn. (2 trains goes up to Shantipur & 1 train goes up to Lalgola at 8.27 am). In South line commuter trains run mostly up to Sealdah via Barasat Jn. Four trains run on circular route via Dum Dum Jn. and Ballygunge Jn. Three of them go up to Majerhat and one goes to Canning. Bandhan Express, connecting Kolkata to Khulna (Bangladesh) also runs through this station on every Thursday.

Extended trains timetable

Train	Daily frequency
Bongaon–Majerhat Local	3
Bongaon–Canning Local	1
Bongaon–Shantipur Jn Local	1
Bongaon–Ranaghat–Lalgola Passenger Special (EMU)	1
International link
Bandhan Express (13129/30)	1 (weekly)

== Border ==
Bangaon is the last station on the line, but the line goes up to the India–Bangladesh border and beyond.

Petrapole, the Indian side of the international border, with a land customs station, handles more than half of the 4 billion dollar trade between India and Bangladesh. With the remote possibility of improvements in the narrow roads leading to the border, because of land acquisition problems, the focus is now on improving the rail transportation system.

== Gallery ==
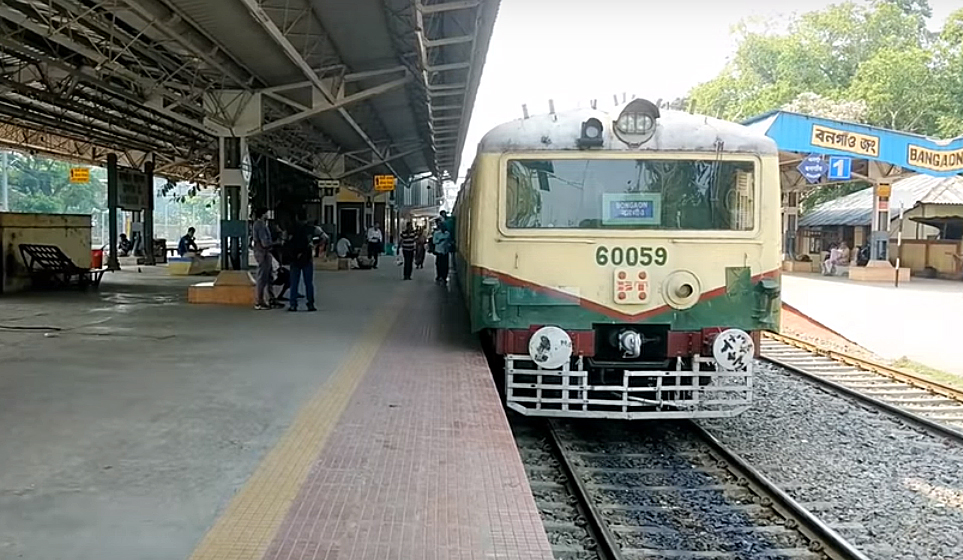
Local train at Bangaon station

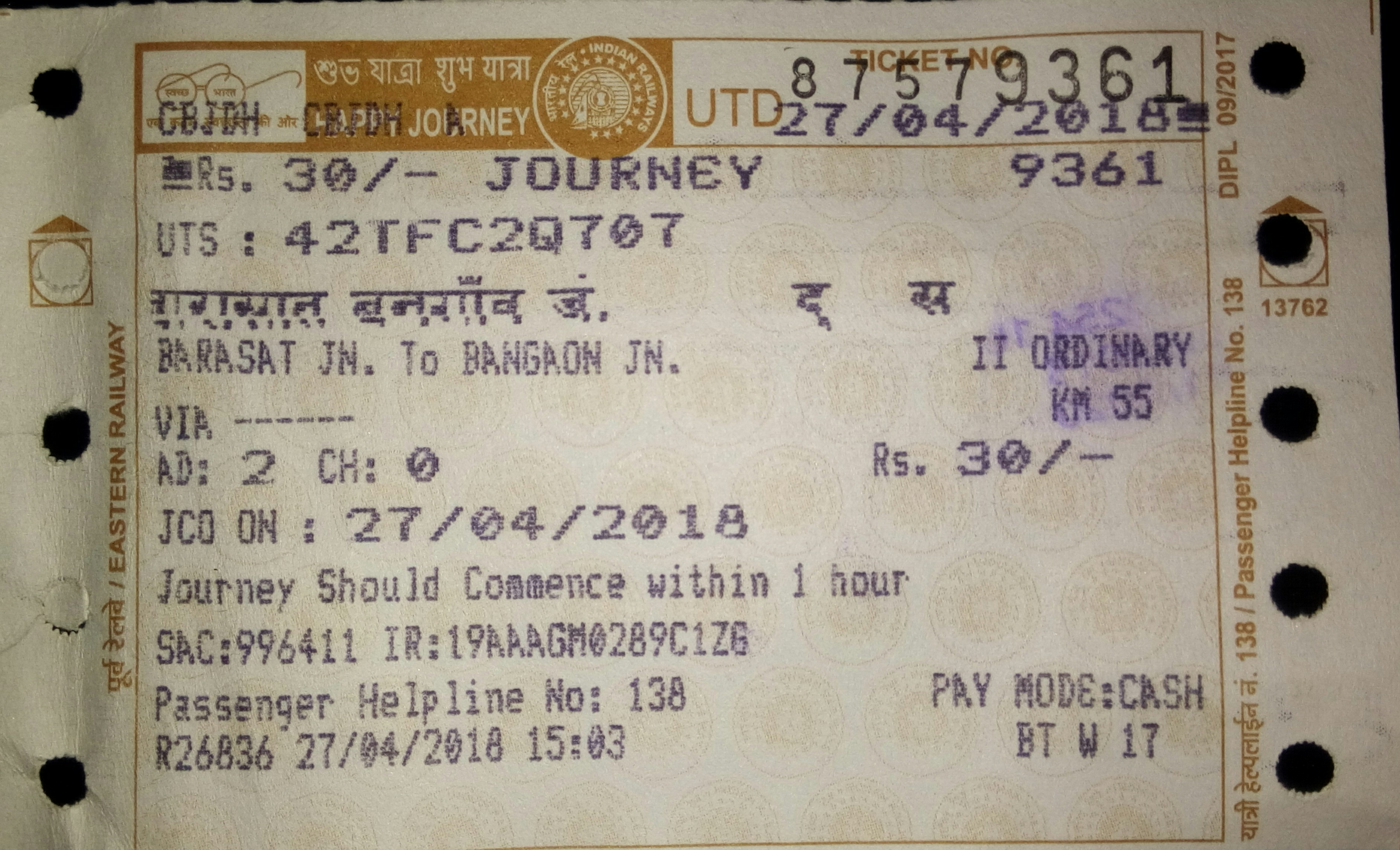
A journey ticket to Bongaon station

== See also ==
- Sealdah railway station
- Birati railway station
- Barasat Junction railway station
- Dum Dum Junction railway station
- Dum Dum Cantonment railway station
