= Sealdah Main and North section =

Railway Route in West Bengal, India

Sealdah Main and North section

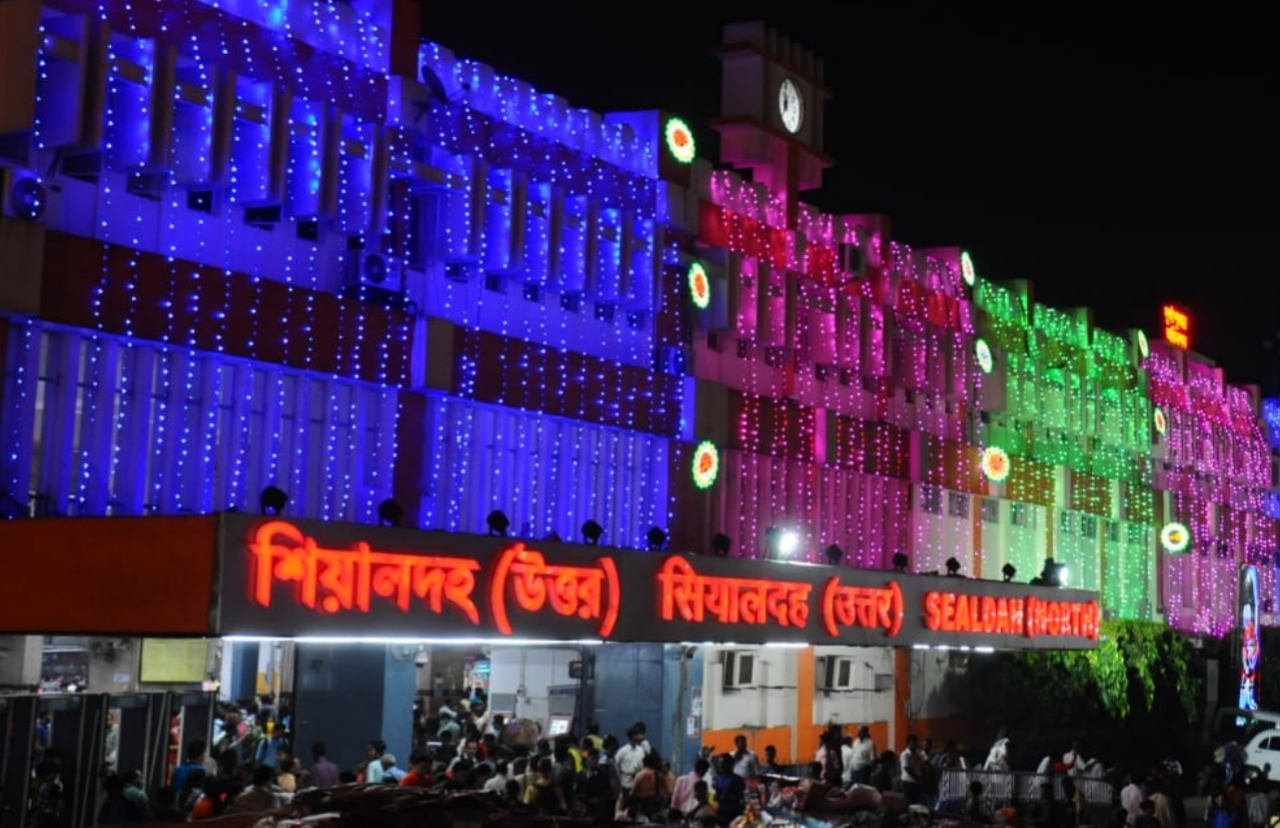

Overview
- Status: Operational
- Owner: Indian Railways
- Locale: Kolkata; North 24 Parganas; Howrah; Purba Bardhaman; Murshidabad; Nadia
- Termini: Sealdah Main and North; Lalgola Gede Bangaon Hasnabad Dankuni
- Website: Eastern Railway

Service
- Type: Commuter rail
- System: Kolkata Suburban Railway
- Services: Sealdah–Dankuni; Dum Dum–Bangaon; Barasat–Hasnabad; Sealdah–Ranaghat–Gede; Ranaghat–Bangaon; Ranaghat–Shantipur–Krishnanagar City; Krishnanagr City–Lalgola
- Operator: Eastern Railway
- Depot(s): Narkeldanaga EMU Carshed; Barasat EMU Carshed; Ranaghat EMU Carshed

History
- Opened: 2 January 1862; 164 years ago

Technical
- Number of tracks: 2
- Character: At grade
- Track gauge: 5 ft 6 in (1,676 mm) broad gauge
- Electrification: 25 kV AC overhead line
- Operating speed: up to 100 km/h (62 mph)

The Sealdah Main and North section refer to a set of rail lines which connect the city of Kolkata with its northern suburbs and with the North 24 Parganas, Nadia and Murshidabad districts of West Bengal, India along the eastern bank of the Hooghly river. It is a part of the Kolkata Suburban Railway and is under the jurisdiction of the Sealdah railway division of the Eastern Railway zone of Indian Railways.

It is linked to the Sealdah South section via the Kolkata Circular Railway at Dum Dum Junction and Kankurgachi Road Junction railway stations. It connects Kolkata to the rest of the country via the Calcutta Chord link line and the Naihati–Bandel branch line, which link it to the districts of Howrah and Hooghly on the west bank of the Hooghly river via the Howrah and Kharagpur division railway networks.

This section also has two international railway transit points, with Bangladesh at Gede and Petrapole from where the majority of the freight traffic from India is imported into Bangladesh.

== Lines and services ==
The section consists of multiple lines which have been treated in detail in separate sections along with their branch lines and services:

- Calcutta Chord link line
  - Andul–Calcutta Chord link (ACCL) branch line
- Sealdah–Ranaghat–Gede line
  - Naihati–Bandel branch line
  - Kalyani–Kalyani Simanta branch line
- Sealdah–Bangaon line
  - Barasat–Hasnabad branch line
  - Ranaghat–Bangaon branch line
  - Dum Dum Cantonment–Biman Bandar branch line (now dismantled)
- Ranaghat–Krishnanagar City–Lalgola branch line
  - Kalinarayanpur–Shantipur–Krishnanagar City branch line
  - Krishnanagar City–Nabadwip Ghat branch line

All the lines, except for the ACCL branch line and the Krishnanagar City–Lalgola section of the Lalgola branch line, are suburban sections which form a part of the Kolkata Suburban Railway system.

== History ==
=== Pre-Partition (1857-1947) ===
The Eastern Bengal Railway (reporting mark :EBR) company was formed in 1857 for the construction and working of a line from Calcutta to Dacca, with a branch to Jessore. The construction of the 112 mi (180 km) long broad gauge line began in 1859 and was completed in stages up to Kushtia by 1864, but the planned branch to Jessore was not built. The company also acquired a steam vessel service operating between Kushtia and Dacca on the Padma River. In 1871 the line was extended from Poradaha to a new ferry terminal at Goalundo Ghat, about 45 mi (72 km) east of Kushtia, reducing the river trip to Dacca, and becoming the main line of the eastern section of EBR. With the successful construction and opening of the Hardinge Bridge in 1915 and gauge conversion of the Santahar–Parbatipur–Siliguri line from 1924 to 1926, the Calcutta–Siliguri broad gauge line was completed and became the main line of the eastern section of EBR.

The Bengal Central Railway (reporting mark :BCR) company constructed two broad gauge lines: one connecting Ranaghat and Bangaon (21 mi (34 km)) in 1882, and the other connecting Dum Dum with Khulna (now in Bangladesh), via Bangaon (108 mi (174 km)), which opened in stages and was completed in 1884. These lines were merged with Eastern Bengal Railway in 1904, with the Sealdah–Bangaon–Jessore–Khulna line becoming the main line of the Central section of EBR.

The Martin's Light Railways (reporting mark :MLR) company constructed and opened the 20 mi (32 km) long, 2 ft 6 in (762 mm) narrow gauge Ranaghat–Krishnanagar Light Railway line from Aistalaghat (near Ranaghat on the right bank of Churni River) to Krishnanagar via Shantipur in 1899. This line was amalgamated with EBR on 1 July 1904. EBR further extended the line from Krishnanagar to Nabadwip Ghat and opened the line for traffic from 30 June 1926. EBR further built a 1 mi (1.6 km) long 5 ft 6 in (1,676 mm) broad gauge extension from Ranaghat to the left bank of Churni River on 1902. In 1925 an alternate 5 ft 6 in (1,676 mm) broad gauge line was built from Kalinarayanpur (Churni Bridge) to Shantipur, and the old 2 ft 6 in (762 mm) gauge line between Shantipur and Aistola Ghat was abandoned.

MLR also constructed and opened a 26 mi (42 km) long 2 ft 6 in (762 mm) narrow gauge line from Barasat to Basirhat in 1905, known as the Barasat–Basirhat light railway (reporting mark :BBLR). It was further extended via Taki to Hasnabad (Chingrighata) in 1909. A 16.62 miles (26.75 km) long extension was built from Beliaghata Bridge on the Barasat–Basirhat line to Patipukur in 1910. This was further extended to Belgachia in 1914 and was known as the Shyambazar Branch.

The 94.28 mi (151.73 km) long Murshidabad Branch railway was constructed by EBR from Ranaghat to Lalgola Ghat in stages from 1905 to 1907.

=== Post-Partition (1947-) ===
After the partition of India in 1947, the Eastern and Central sections of EBR were divided between India and East Pakistan. The direct connection between South Bengal and North Bengal was affected as the Calcutta–Siliguri line was snapped, resulting in Haldibari–Chilahati and Gede–Darsana becoming international transit points for trains. In the Central section, Petrapole railway station was created as the terminus on the Indian side while the Benapole railway station became the terminus in the East Pakistani side of the line. The Barisal Express, launched in 1884, from Sealdah to Khulna, continued post-partition until rail services between the two countries were suspended due to the Indo-Pakistani War of 1965.

The Barasat–Basirhat light railway closed down in 1955 due to increasing losses. However, a new 5 ft 6 in (1,676 mm) broad gauge line was built in a new alignment between Barasat and Hasnabad from 1957 to 1962. The Shyambazar branch line was abandoned.

The gauge conversion of the Shantipur–Krishnanagar City–Nabadwip Ghat line to 5 ft 6 in (1,676 mm) broad gauge began in 2010. The electrified broad gauge line between Shantipur and Krishnanagar City was opened for service in 2012. The construction of the rest of the section along with a new bridge over the Ganges river is blocked due to land disputes.

== Electrification ==
The Sealdah Main and North section lines are fully electrified with a 25 kV AC overhead system. The electrification process started in 1963 from Sealdah to Ranaghat. The Ranaghat–Shantipur and Ranaghat–Krishnanagar City lines were electrified in 1964. The ACCL and Kalyani Simanta branch lines were electrified in 1972 and 1979 respectively.

== EMU Carsheds ==
The Sealdah North section is primarily served by nine-car EMU rakes from the Narkeldanga EMU Carshed. It was originally a steam locoshed which was transformed into an EMU carshed in 1963 along with the facility to maintain electric locomotives as well. As of December 2021, it contains 29 9-car EMU rakes, a few of which served the Sealdah South section mostly via the Circular line, while the rest served the Sealdah North section.

To handle the increased traffic requirements of the Sealdah–Bangaon, Barasat–Hasnabad and Ranaghat–Bangaon lines, a new EMU carshed was opened in Barasat in 1990. In 2018, three phase IGBT based 12-car EMU rakes were introduced in this carshed. As of December 2021, the shed contains eight nine-car EMU rakes and 25 12-car EMU rakes, six of which are three phase IGBT based.

In 2007, a new EMU carshed was commissioned in Ranaghat to cater to the increased traffic requirements in the Ranaghat–Gede, Ranaghat–Lalgola and Ranaghat–Shantipur–Krishnanagar City lines. MEMU services were also introduced in 2012 between Sealdah and Lalgola. As of December 2021, the shed contains 15 12-car EMU rakes and five MEMU rakes, of which one is an eight-car rake while the rest are 12-car rakes.
