= Malatipur railway station =

Railway station in West Bengal, India

Malatipur
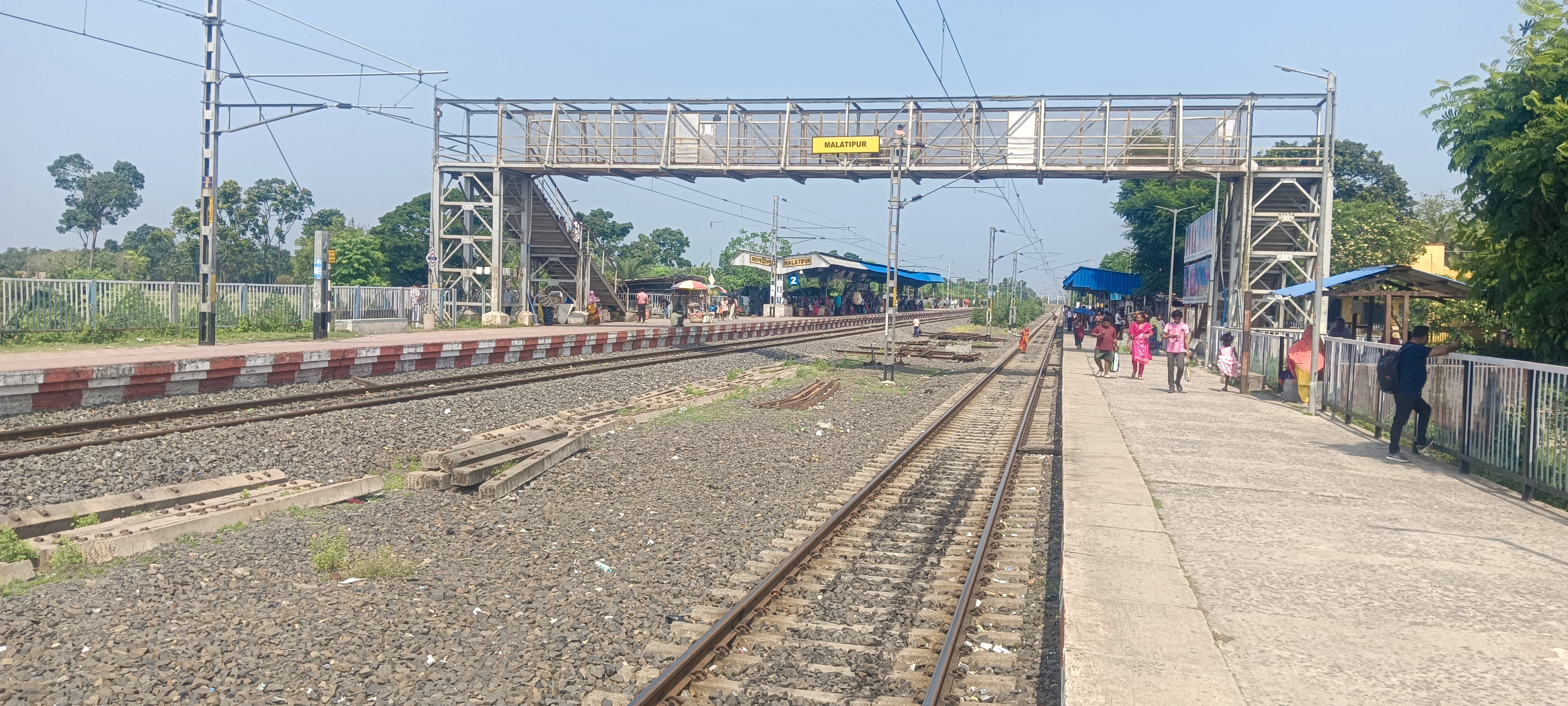
- Malatipur railway station

General information
- Location: Malatipur, North 24 Parganas district, West Bengal; India
- Coordinates: 22.651631°N 88.762694°E
- System: Kolkata Suburban Railway station
- Owner: Indian Railways
- Operator: Indian Railways
- Line: Sealdah–Hasnabad–Bangaon–Ranaghat line
- Platforms: 2
- Tracks: 2

Construction
- Structure type: At Ground
- Parking: Not available

Other information
- Status: Opened
- Station code: MPE
- Zone(s): Eastern Railway
- Division(s): Sealdah

Services
Preceding station	Kolkata Suburban Railway	Following station
Kankra Mirzanagar towards Sealdah	Eastern Line Sealdah–Bangaon section	Ghovarash Ghona towards Hasnabad
Route map
Location
- Location within West Bengal Location within India

Malatipur is a Kolkata Suburban Railway station on the Barasat–Hasnabad line. It is located in North 24 Parganas district in the Indian state of West Bengal.

== History ==
Barasat Basirhat Railway constructed a 762 mm (2 ft 6 in) narrow-gauge line in 1914 as a part of Martin's Light Railways. The line was closed in 1955.

The 33.06 km (21 mi) long 1,676 mm (5 ft 6 in)-wide 5 ft 6 in (1,676 mm) broad gauge Barasat–Hasnabad branch line was constructed between 1957 and 1962.

== See also ==
- North 24 Parganas district
- Indian Railways
- Sealdah railway station
- Sealdah–Hasnabad–Bangaon–Ranaghat line
- Bangaon Junction railway station
- Transport in West Bengal
- List of railway stations in India
