= Thakurnagar railway station =

Railway station in West Bengal, India

Thakurnagar
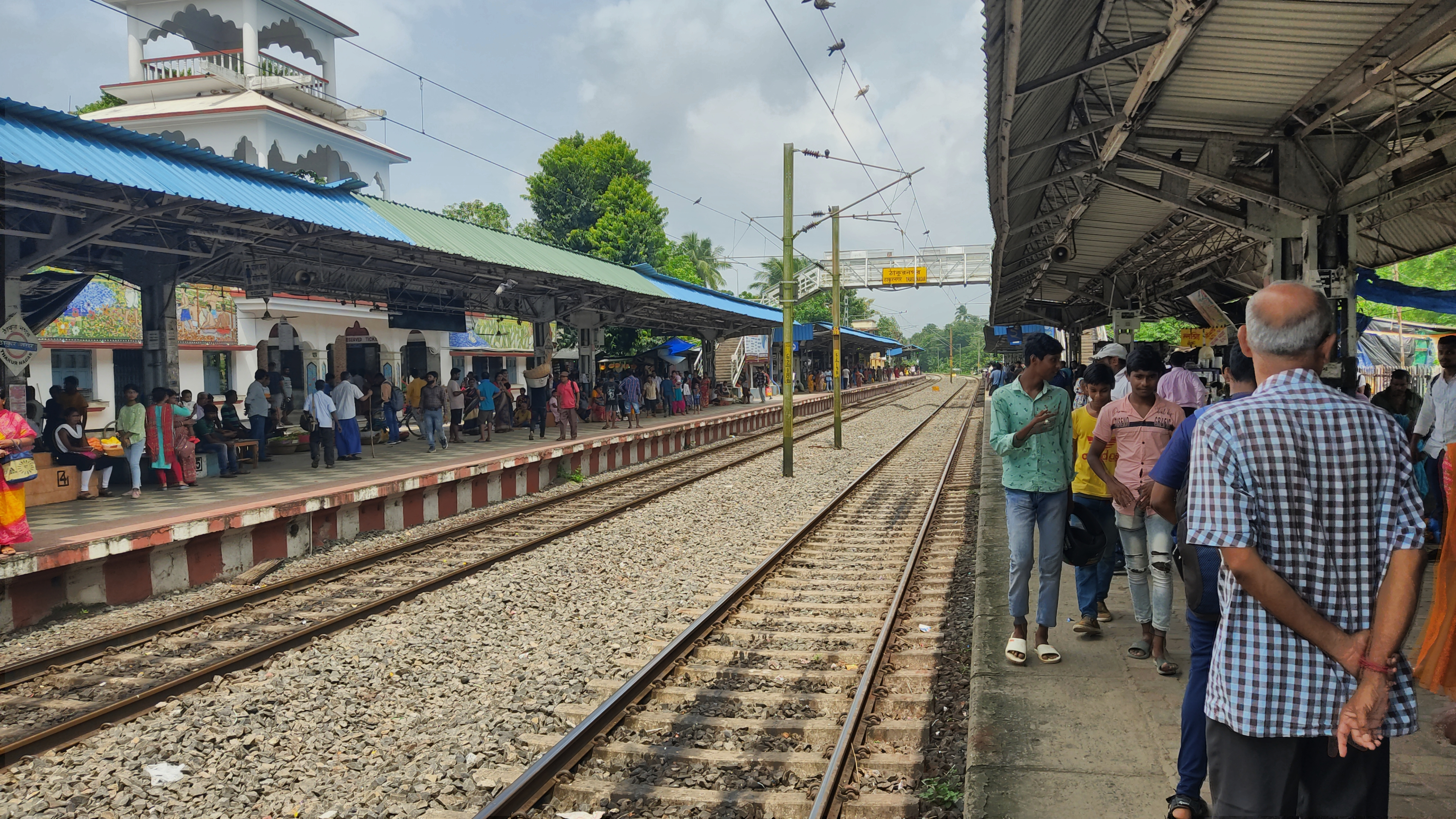

General information
- Location: Thakurnagar, North 24 Parganas district, West Bengal; India
- Coordinates: 22.924662°N 88.777850°E
- Elevation: 9 metres (30 ft)
- System: Kolkata Suburban Railway station
- Owner: Indian Railways
- Operator: Eastern Railway
- Line: Sealdah–Hasnabad–Bangaon–Ranaghat line of Kolkata Suburban Railway
- Distance: 72 km
- Platforms: 2 ( 3 Number Platform is Under Construction)
- Tracks: 2 ( 3 Number Track is Under Construction)
- Train operators: EMU
- Bus routes: None
- Bus stands: None
- Bus operators: Closed

Construction
- Structure type: At grade
- Parking: Available
- Cycle facilities: Available

Other information
- Status: Active
- Station code: TKNR
- Zone(s): Eastern Railway
- Division(s): Sealdah
- Fare zone: Eastern Railway

History
- Opened: 1956; 70 years ago
- Rebuilt: 2007; 19 years ago
- Electrified: 1972; 54 years ago
- Original company: Indian Railways

Services
Preceding station	Kolkata Suburban Railway	Following station
Gobardanga towards Sealdah	Eastern Line Dum Dum–Bangaon branch line	Chandpara towards Bangaon Junction
Route map
Location
- Location within West Bengal Location within India

Thakurnagar (Code: TKNR) is a small railway station in North 24 Parganas, West Bengal on Sealdah–Bangaon line. It serves Thakurnagar. The station consists of two side platforms, which are both very well sheltered. It is located 63 kilometres (39 mi) from the line's terminal, Sealdah.

== History ==
Thakurnagar is a busy railway station. In 2009 it was sanctioned as model station. Thakurnagar railway station is located on Sealdah–Hasnabad–Bangaon–Ranaghat line of Kolkata Suburban Railway. Link between Dum Dum to Khulna now in Bangladesh, via Bangaon was constructed by Bengal Central Railway Company in 1882–84. The Sealdah–Dum Dum–Barasat–Bangaon sector was electrified in 1963–64.

== Connections ==
The Thakurnagar-Chandpara road passes by the station. Besides, the station is connected by road with Gaighata and Gobardanga. There are Auto services from the station to Chandpara and Shutia, Gaighata, Charghat. For short distances there are Van and Toto services.

== Modernization ==
After several severe rail accidents, in 2016 Mamata Banerjee, then Railway Minister of India, proposed a modernization of the station. Thus, the two platforms of it are now fully sheltered and new ticket collection rooms were constructed.

== See also ==
- North 24 Parganas district
- Indian Railways
- Sealdah railway station
- Sealdah–Hasnabad–Bangaon–Ranaghat line
- Bangaon Junction railway station
- Transport in West Bengal
- List of railway stations in India
