= Habra railway station =

Railway station in West Bengal, India

Habra

General information
- Location: Habra, North 24 Parganas district, West Bengal; India
- Coordinates: 22.840921°N 88.657491°E
- Elevation: 11 metres (36 ft)
- System: Kolkata Suburban Railway station
- Owner: Indian Railways
- Operator: Eastern Railway
- Line: Sealdah–Hasnabad–Bangaon–Ranaghat line of Kolkata Suburban Railway
- Platforms: 3
- Tracks: 3

Construction
- Structure type: At grade
- Parking: Not available
- Cycle facilities: Not available

Other information
- Status: Active
- Station code: HB
- Zone(s): Eastern Railway
- Division(s): Sealdah

History
- Opened: 1906; 120 years ago
- Electrified: 1972; 54 years ago

Services
Preceding station	Kolkata Suburban Railway	Following station
Ashoknagar Road towards Sealdah	Eastern Line Dum Dum–Bangaon branch line	Sanhati Halt towards Bangaon Junction
Route map
Location
- Location within West Bengal Location within India

Habra railway station, station code HB, is a station of Eastern Railway. It is 45 km (28 mi) away from Sealdah railway station and 23 km (14 mi) from Barasat on the Sealdah–Bangaon line of Eastern Railway. It serves Habra town and is a part of the Kolkata Suburban Railway system. Station master:Deborshi Ghambush

== Station complex ==
The station consists of three platforms. It has facilities including drinking water and sanitation. Here, both two types of railway tickets - reserved and unreserved are available.

== Electrification ==
The Sealah–Dum Dum–Barasat–Ashok Nagar–Bangaon line was electrified in 1963–64.

== Connectivity ==
Habra railway station connects Gobardanga, Thakurnagar and Bangaon to Sealdah station and other stations of the Sealdah–Bangaon line. It is directly connected to NH 112 (Jessore Road). Habra is a major railway station between Bangaon junction railway station and Barasat junction railway station.

== History ==
Habra is located on Sealdah–Hasnabad–Bangaon–Ranaghat line of Kolkata Suburban Railway. It links between Dum Dum to Khulna now in Bangladesh, via Bangaon was constructed by Bengal Central Railway Company in 1882–84.

== The station layout ==
G	Street level	Exit/Entrance & ticket counter
P1	FOB, Side platform, No-1 doors will open on the left/right
P1	Track 1	Towards →Bangaon→ →
P1	Track 2	Towards ←Sealdah← ←
P1	FOB, Island platform, No- 2 doors will open on the left/right
P1	Island platform, No- 3 doors will open on the left/right
P1	Track 3	Towards ←Sealdah← ←

== See also ==
- North 24 Parganas district
- Indian Railways
- Sealdah railway station
- Sealdah–Hasnabad–Bangaon–Ranaghat line
- Bangaon Junction railway station
- Transport in West Bengal
- List of railway stations in India
