= Sealdah–Bangaon line =

Railway Route in West Bengal, India

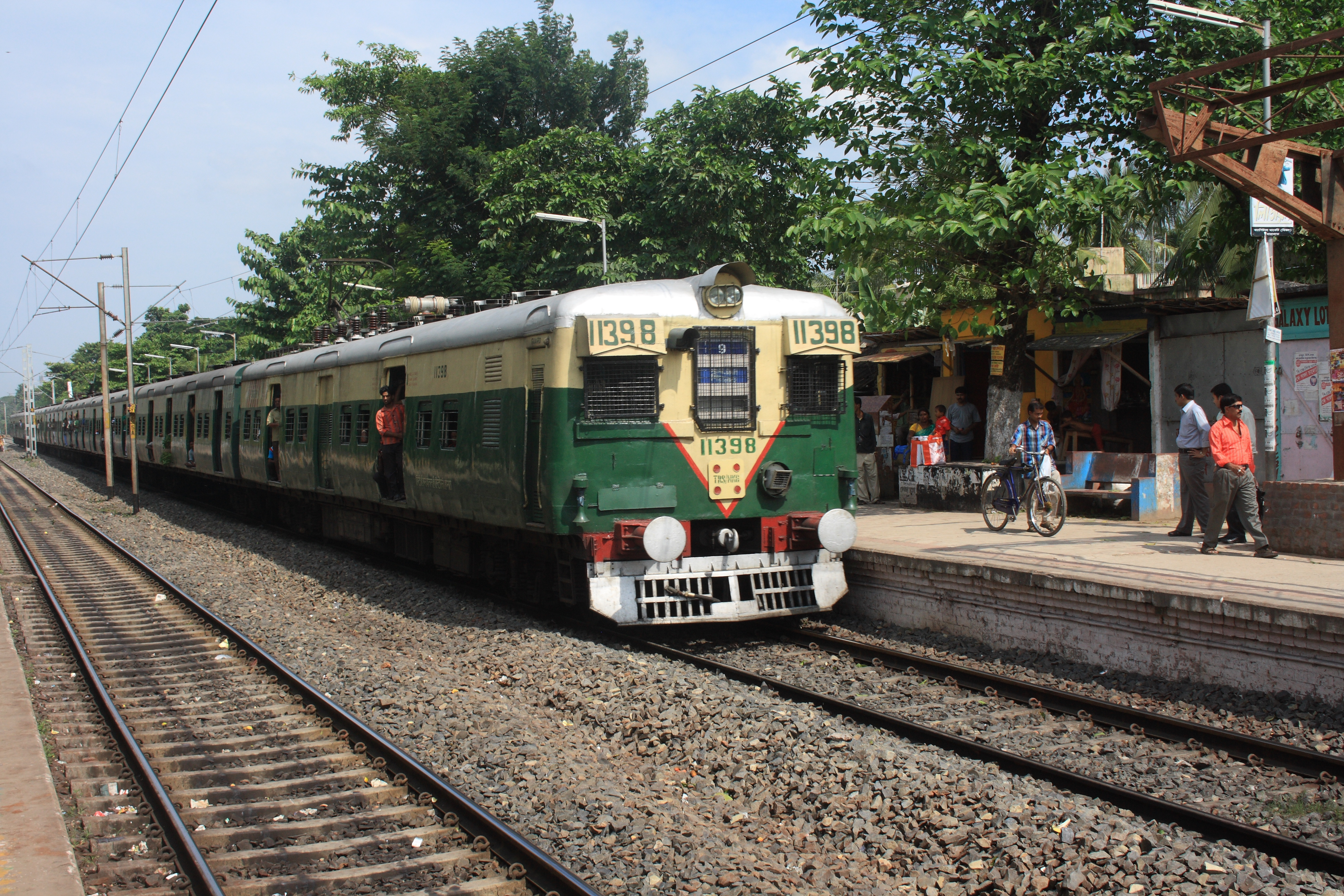
- A Kolkata Suburban Railway EMU at the Hridaypur railway station

Overview
- Status: Operational
- Owner: Indian Railways
- Locale: West Bengal
- Termini: Sealdah (South); Bangaon (North)
- Stations: 53
- Website: Eastern Railway

Service
- Type: Commuter rail
- System: Kolkata Suburban Railway
- Services: Sealdah – Bangaon (main); Barasat – Hasnabad (branch); Ranaghat – Bangaon (branch)
- Operator: Eastern Railway
- Depots: Narkeldanga EMU Car Shed; Barasat EMU Car Shed; Ranaghat EMU Car Shed

History
- Opened: Sealdah – Bangaon: 1882; 144 years ago; Barasat – Hasnabad: 1962; 64 years ago

Technical
- Line length: 162 km (101 mi)
- Number of tracks: Sealdah – Bangaon: 2; Barasat – Hasnabad: Barasat – Champapukur (0–35km): 2; Champapukur – Hasnabad (35–52km): 1; Ranaghat – Bangaon: 1
- Character: At-grade
- Track gauge: 1,676 mm (5 ft 6 in) broad gauge
- Electrification: 25 kV overhead line
- Operating speed: up to 100 kmph

The Sealdah–Bangaon line is a 78 km (48 mi) long broad gauge railway line that connects the Sealdah railway station of Kolkata with Bangaon of North 24 Parganas in the Indian state of West Bengal. Once a part of the old Calcutta–Jessore–Khulna line, today it is a busy suburban section of the Kolkata Suburban Railway. It is under the jurisdiction of the Sealdah railway division of the Eastern Railway zone of Indian Railways.

The line has two branch lines. The 53 km (33 mi) long Barasat–Basirhat–Hasnabad branch line with 20 stations provides connectivity to much of the Basirhat subdivision of the North 24 Parganas district, while the 28 km (17 mi) long Ranaghat–Bangaon branch line with 9 stations connects this line with the Ranaghat Junction on the Sealdah–Ranaghat section.

== Services ==
The line was a part of the old Calcutta–Jessore–Khulna line with trains such as the Barisal Express running through it. Today however it is primarily a suburban section with a total of 138 daily and 112 Sunday EMU services serving the Sealdah–Bangaon section. A further 31 EMU services between Bangaon and Ranaghat junctions, and 2 EMU services, between Bangaon and Shantipur junctions, run via the Ranaghat–Bangaon branch line. The Barasat–Hasnabad branch line is served by a total of 46 daily and 38 Sunday EMU services. Majority of the services are provided by 9-car and 12-car EMU rakes from the Barasat EMU Carshed. Few services in the Ranaghat–Bangaon line are provided by 12-car EMU rakes from the Ranaghat EMU Carshed as well.

Petrapole railway station serves as a major international transit point for freight and, recently, passengers to Bangladesh with the Benapole railway station serving as its Bangladeshi counterpart. The Benapole land port, the largest land port of Bangladesh, is directly served by this line along with the roadways at the Benapole Border Crossing and accounts for more than 90% of the imported Indian goods into Bangladesh. Major freight commodities handled by this section are foodgrains, fuel, medical oxygen, stone and gypsum amongst others.

On 9 November 2017, a bi-weekly international service from Kolkata to Khulna called the Bandhan Express was started by the Indian and Bangladeshi governments. The train initially had stoppages only at Kolkata, Petrapole, Benapole and Khulna with Petrapole and Benapole serving as border checkpoints. However, due to popular demand a new three minute stoppage was added at Jessore Junction railway station on 7 March 2019.

The line has an interchange station at Dum Dum Junction with the Blue Line of the Kolkata Metro and the Sealdah Main and North section. Completion of construction and opening of the Yellow Line of Kolkata Metro is expected provide four more interchange stations at Dum Dum Cantonment, Madhyamgram, Hridaypur and Barasat Junction.

== History ==
=== Pre-partition (1882–1947) ===
==== Bengal Central Railway ====
The Bengal Central Railway company (reporting mark :BCR) was formed in 1881 to build and operate a 5 ft 6 in (1,676 mm) broad gauge railway line from Sealdah to Khulna via Jessore with a branch from Bangaon to Ranaghat.

It constructed the two broad gauge lines: one connecting Ranaghat and Bangaon (21 miles (34 km)) in 1882 and the other connecting Dum Dum with Khulna (now in Bangladesh), via Bangaon (108 miles (174 km)) which opened in stages and was completed in 1884. These lines were merged with Eastern Bengal Railway in 1904.

==== Eastern Bengal Railway ====
With the takeover of BCR, the Calcutta–Bangaon–Jessore–Khulna line became the main line of the Central section of Eastern Bengal Railway (reporting mark :EBR). The Patipukur Loop line from Dum Dum Cantonment to Patipukur was opened on 1904 as well. In 1942, EBR was merged with the Assam Bengal Railway (reporting mark :ABR) to form the Bengal and Assam Railway (reporting mark :B&AR).

==== Barasat–Basirhat Light Railway ====
The Barasat–Basirhat Light Railway (reporting mark :BBLR) was a 26 miles (42 km) long 2 ft 6 in (762 mm) narrow gauge railway that was constructed by the Martin's Light Railways company in 1905 between Barasat and Basirhat. It was further extended via Taki to Hasnabad (Chingrighata) in 1909. A 16.62 miles (26.75 km) long extension was built from Beliaghata Bridge on the Barasat–Basirhat line to Patipukur in 1910. This was further extended to Belgachia in 1914 and was known as the Shyambazar Branch.

=== Post-partition (1947–) ===
==== Eastern Railway ====
Following the partition of India in 1947, the Calcutta–Khulna line was divided into two parts and the Petrapole railway station became the terminus on the Indian side while the Benapole railway station became the terminus in the Bangladeshi side of the line. The Calcutta (now Sealdah)–Bangaon–Petrapole section came under the jurisdiction of the Sealdah division of the Eastern Railway zone of the Indian Railways while the Benapole–Jessore–Khulna section came under the jurisdiction of the Eastern Bengal Railway (renamed as Pakistan Eastern Railway on 1961) of the then East Pakistan.

The Barisal Express, launched in 1884, from Calcutta to Khulna continued post-partition until rail services between the two countries were suspended due to the Indo-Pakistani War of 1965. Following the liberation of Bangladesh, freight services between the two countries were restored for a brief period of two years in 1972 but closed again due to a lack of goods. India and Bangladesh signed an agreement in July 2000 to resume freight services and the first freight train ran across the link on 21 January 2001. The Bandhan Express, a weekly service, was introduced on this line in November 2017. It traces the old route of the Barisal Express except for having its terminus in the Kolkata railway station instead of Sealdah railway station.

The Barasat–Basirhat Light Railway (reporting mark :BBLR) closed down in 1955 due to continuous losses. The Barasat-Hasnabad section of the BBLR was converted into a 5 ft 6 in (1,676 mm) broad gauge and was built in a new alignment between 1957 and 1962 becoming the Barasat–Hasnabad branch line. The Shyambazar branch of the BBLR was abandoned.

The Dum Dum Cantonment–Biman Bandar branch line was built by the Eastern Railway and was inaugurated in July 2006. Due to losses and poor patronage owing to the location of the station and odd timings of the services, the services on the line were closed down in 2016. The line was further dismantled in 2020 to make way for the Yellow Line.

==== Numbering series details ====
There are some patterns in the numbering in local trains of Sealdah Bangaon section.

- 332** series: Hasnabad – Dumdum – Barrackpore Local and Barrackpore – Dumdum – Gobardanga Local
- 333** series: Trains originate from Barasat like all Barasat Hasnabad Local and Barasat Bangaon Local (UP and DN)
- 334** series: Sealdah Madhyamgram Local and Sealdah Barasat Local (UP and DN)
- 335** series: Sealdah – Hasnabad Local (UP and DN)
- 336** series: Sealdah Duttapukur Local (3362* sub series), Sealdah Habra Local (3366* sub series) and Sealdah Gobardanga Local ( 3368* sub series) (UP and DN)
- 337** series: Ranaghat – Bangaon – Ranaghat Local
- 338** series: Sealdah – Bangaon – Sealdah Local

== Tracks and Electrification ==
The Sealdah–Barasat–Bangaon section is a double line section whereas the Ranaghat–Bangaon–Petrapole–Benapole section is a single line section. In the Barasat–Hasnabad branch line, the Barasat–Sondalia and Lebutala–Champapukur sections are double lined whereas the Champapukur–Hasnabad section is a single line section. The doubling of the Sondalia–Lebutala section of the line is currently under progress.

All the lines in the section are fully electrified with 25 kV AC overhead system. The Sealdah–Bangaon line was electrified in 1963–64, while the Barasat–Hasnabad branch line was electrified in 2002–03

== EMU Car shed ==
The lines are primarily served by 9-car and 12-car EMU rakes from the Barasat EMU Carshed. Few services in the Ranaghat–Bangaon line are provided by 12-car EMU rakes from the Ranaghat EMU Carshed as well.

While the section was initially served by the Narkeldanga EMU carshed which opened on 1963, due to the increasing traffic requirements in the Sealdah–Bangaon section and the electrified Barasat–Hasnabad and Ranaghat–Bangaon sections led to the commissioning of the Barasat EMU Carshed in 1990. In 2018, three phase IGBT based 12-car EMU rakes were introduced in this carshed. As of January 2022, the shed contains 8 9-car EMU rakes and 25 12-car EMU rakes, 6 of which are three phase IGBT based.

Similar increase in traffic requirements in the Ranaghat–Gede, Ranaghat–Bangaon, Ranaghat–Shantipur–Krishnanagar City and Ranaghat–Lalgola sections led to the commissioning of the Ranaghat EMU carshed in 2007. As of January 2022, the car shed contains 15 12-car EMU rakes and 6 MEMU rakes of which one is an 8-car rake while the rest are 12-car rakes. Three of the 12-car MEMU rakes are three phase IGBT based rakes.

Nowadays, 3 phase emu is running on tracks. Narkeldanga EMU Carshed has 2 nos 12Car 3phase Alstom rakes and RHA has 5 rakes and BT has 10 nos of 3 phase rakes which are in service in this line. In BNJ, 6 rakes are night stabled and other trains shed in their respective carshed.

== Routes and stations ==
=== Stations ===
Names in bold indicate that the station is a major stop or an important interchange/terminal station.

==== Sealdah–Barasat–Bangaon line ====
Sealdah–Barasat–Bangaon line
#	Distance from Sealdah Main and North (km)	Station name	Station code	Connections	Station category
1	0	**Sealdah Main and North**	SDAH	Sealdah South section	NSG-1
2	5	**Bidhannagar Road**	BNXR	–	SG-2
3	8	**Dum Dum Junction**	DDJ	Sealdah–Ranaghat–Gede line /Calcutta Chord link line / Kolkata Metro Blue Line (Dum Dum metro station)	SG-2
4	11	Dum Dum Cantonment	DDC	–	SG-3
5	13	Durganagar	DGNR	–	SG-3
6	14	Birati	BBT	–	SG-3
7	16	Bisharpara Kodaliya	BRPK	–	SG-3
8	17	New Barrackpur	NBE	–	SG-3
9	19	**Madhyamgram**	MMG	Kolkata Metro Yellow Line (Madhyamgram metro station)	SG-2
10	21	Hridaypur	HHR	Kolkata Metro Yellow Line (Hridaypur metro station)	SG-3
11	23	**Barasat Junction**	BT	Barasat–Hasnabad branch line /Kolkata Metro Yellow Line (Barasat metro station)	SG-2
12	27	Bamangachhi	BMG	–	SG-3
13	31	Dattapukur	DTK	–	SG-3
14	35	Bira	BIRA	–	SG-3
15	38	Guma	GUMA	–	SG-3
16	42	Ashoknagar Road	ASKR	–	SG-3
17	45	**Habra**	HB	–	SG-2
18	50	Sanhati	SNHT	–	HG-3
19	55	Machhalandapur	MSL	–	SG-3
20	58	**Gobardanga**	GBG	–	SG-3
21	64	**Thakurnagar**	TKNR	–	SG-3
22	68	Chandpara	CDP	–	SG-3
23	73	Bibhutibhusan Halt	BNAA	–	HG-3
24	77	**Bangaon Junction**	BNJ	Ranaghat–Bangaon branch line	SG-3
↑↓ International passenger or freight traffic only
25	82	Petrapole	PTPL	Petrapole Land Port	HG-3

==== Barasat–Hasnabad branch line ====
Barasat–Hasnabad branch line
#	Distance from Barasat Junction (km)	Station name	Station code	Connections	Station category
1	0	**Barasat Junction**	BT	Sealdah–Barasat–Bangaon line /Kolkata Metro Yellow Line (Barasat metro station)	SG-2
2	3	Kazipara	KZPR	–	HG-3
3	6	Karea Kadambagachi	KBGH	–	HG-3
4	10	Bahira Kalibari	BHKA	–	HG-3
5	12	Sondalia	SXC	–	SG-3
6	15	Beliaghata Road	BGRD	–	HG-3
7	18	Lebutala	LBTL	–	HG-3
8	20	Bhasila	BSLA	–	SG-3
9	23	Harua Road	HRO	–	SG-3
10	27	Kankra Mirzanagar	KMZA	–	HG-3
11	31	Malatipur	MPE	–	SG-3
12	33	Ghora Ras Ghona	GGV	–	HG-3
13	36	Champapukur	CQR	–	SG-3
14	41	Bhyabla	BBLA	–	HG-3
15	42	**Basirhat**	BSHT	–	SG-3
16	45	Matania Anantapur	MNAP	–	HG-3
17	47	Madhyampur	MPN	–	HG-3
18	48	Nimdanri	NMDR	–	HG-3
19	51	Taki Road	TKF	–	SG-3
20	53	**Hasnabad**	HNB	–	SG-3

==== Ranaghat–Bangaon branch line ====
Ranaghat–Bangaon branch line
#	Distance from Ranaghat Junction (km)	Station name	Station code	Connections	Station category
1	0	**Ranaghat Junction**	BT	Sealdah–Ranaghat–Gede line / Ranaghat–Krishnanagar City–Lalgola line	SG-2
2	3	Coopers Halt	CPHT	–	HG-3
3	5	Naba Raynagar	NBRN	–	HG-3
4	10	Gangnapur	GGP	–	SG-3
5	15	**Majhergram**	MAJ	–	SG-3
6	18	Akaipur Halt	AKIP	–	HG-3
7	18	Gopalnagar	GN	–	SG-3
8	23	Satberia Halt	STBB	–	HG-3
9	28	**Bangaon Junction**	BNJ	Sealdah–Bangaon branch line	SG-3
↑↓ International passenger or freight traffic only
10	32	Petrapole	PTPL	Petrapole Land Port	HG-3

== Planned extensions ==
The Machhalandapur–Swarupnagar, Bira–Chakla, Bangaon–Chandabazar–Bagdah, Bangaon–Poramaheshtala and Hasnabad–Hingalganj new lines were sanctioned in the railway budgets between 2009 and 2012 under the tenure of Mamata Banerjee as the railway minister. None of the projects, however, could be started because of non-availability of land, and hence the work has been kept under abeyance by the Railway Board.

== In popular culture ==
The name and the setting of the Bengali social drama film 8:08 Er Bongaon Local is based on the daily suburban EMU local which leaves the Sealdah station for Bangaon Junction at 8:08 a.m. IST.

== Gallery ==
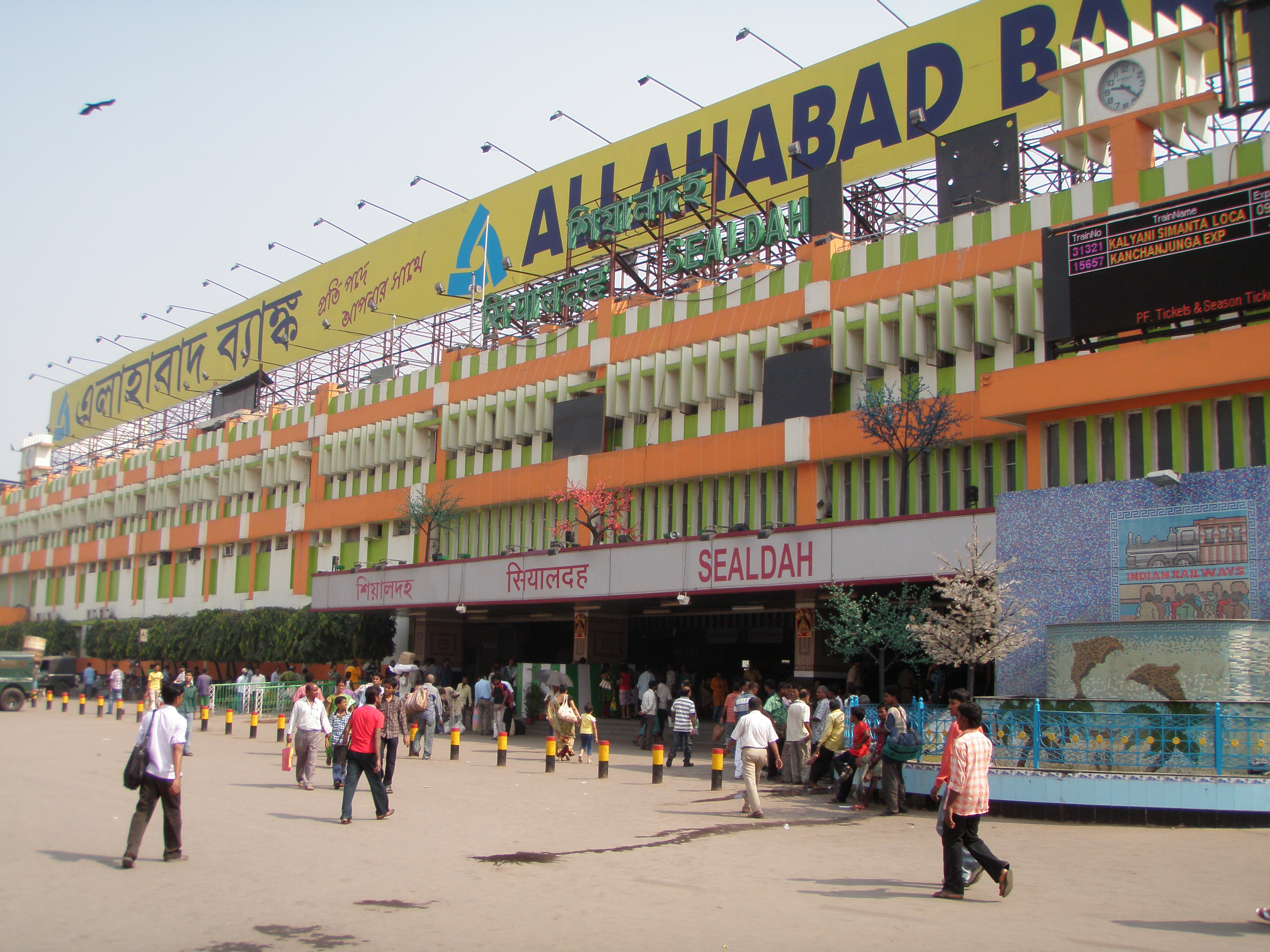
Main entrance of the Sealdah railway station

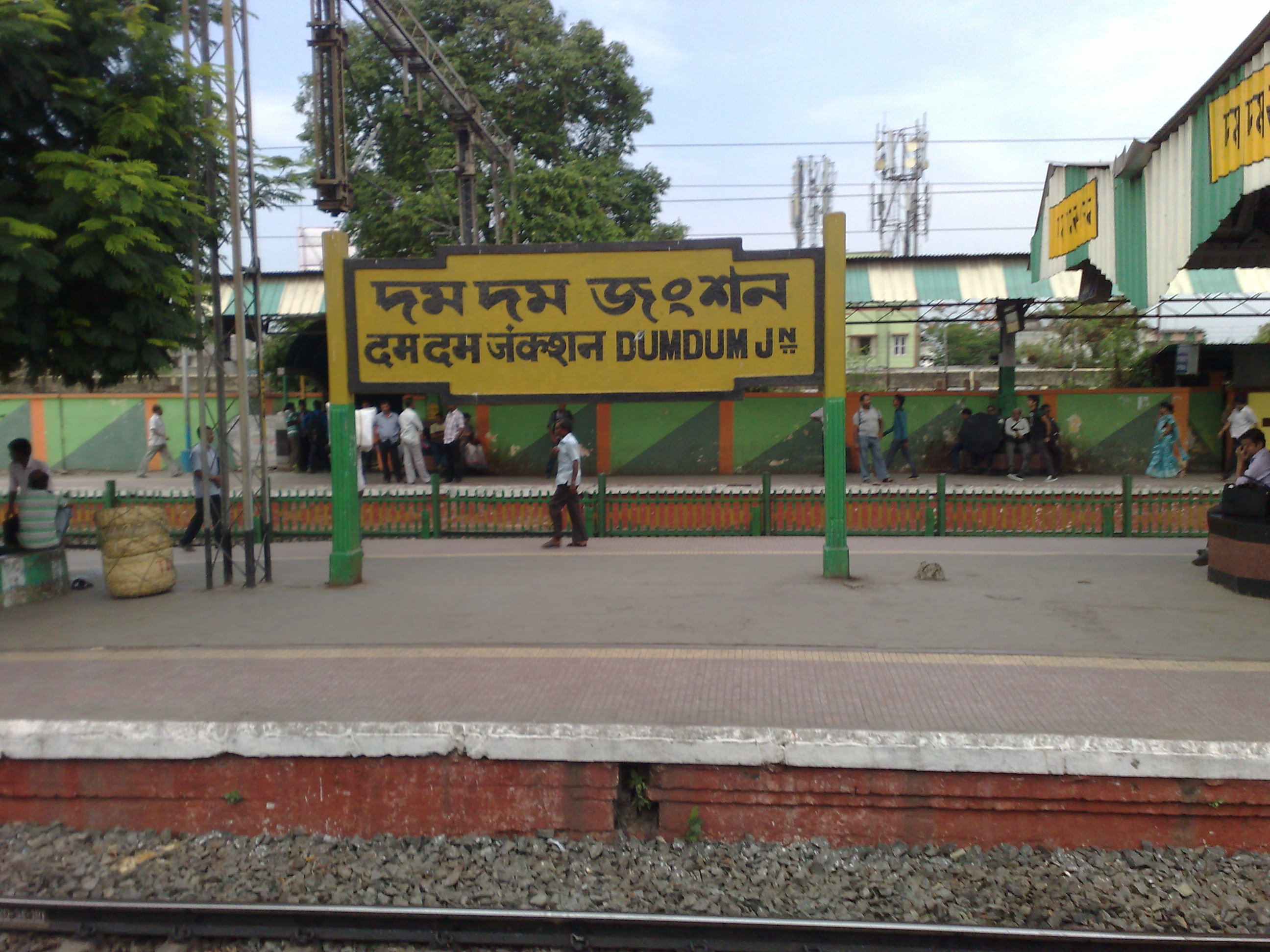
Dum Dum Junction railway station platform board

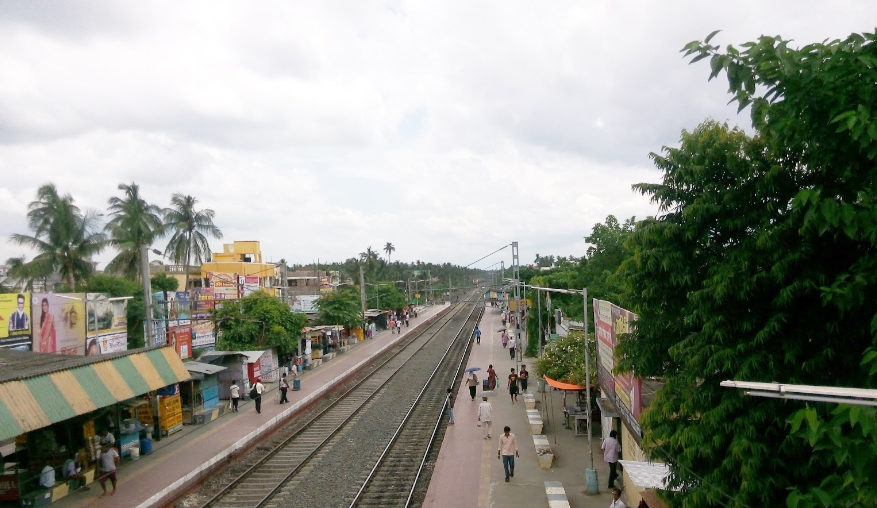
Bird's eye view of Birati railway station

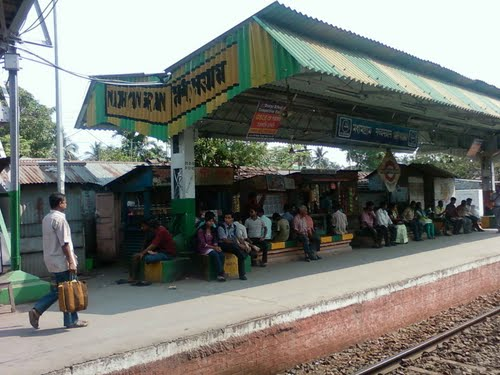
Platform of Madhyamgram railway station

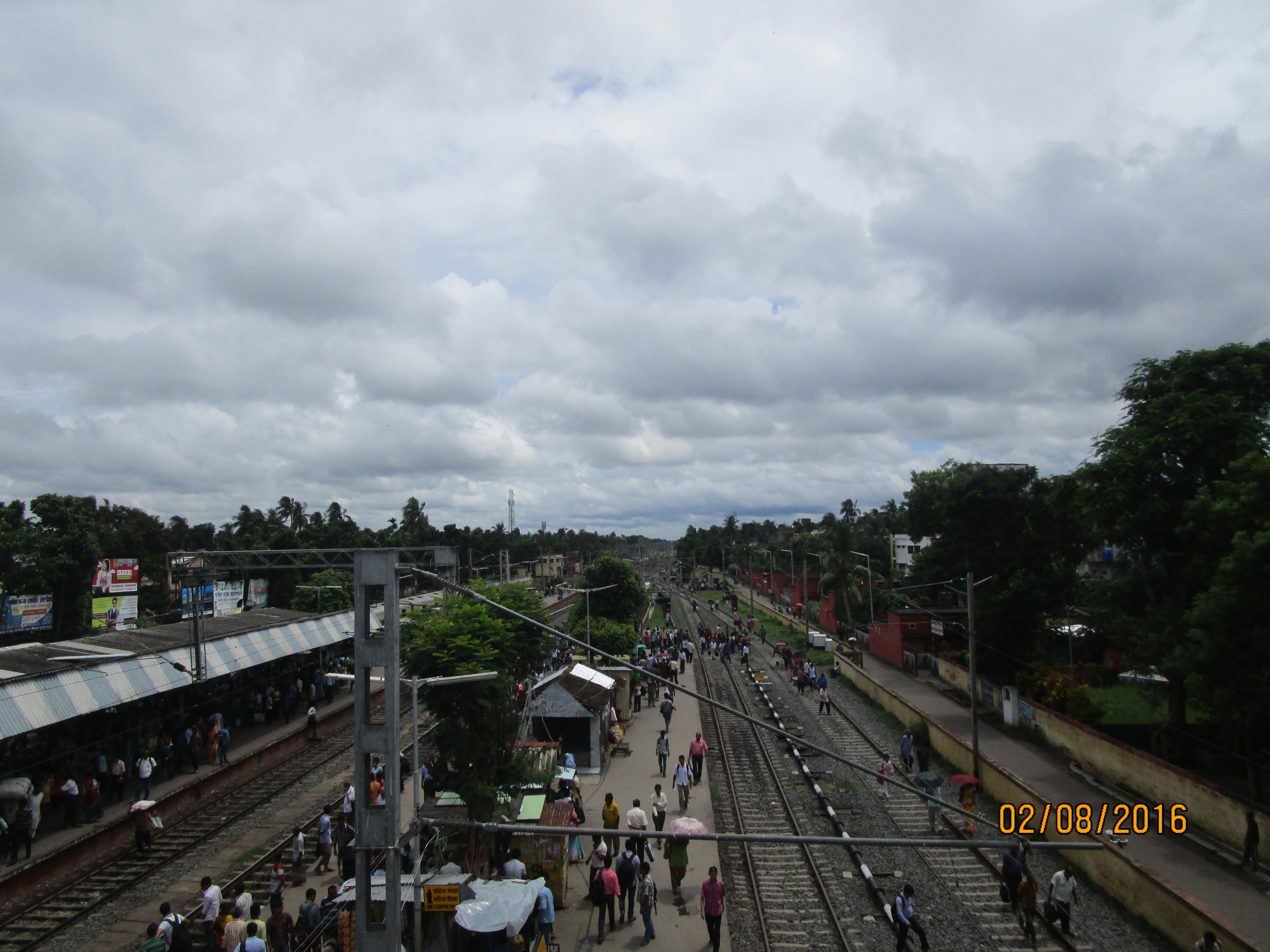
Bird's eye view of Barasat Junction railway station

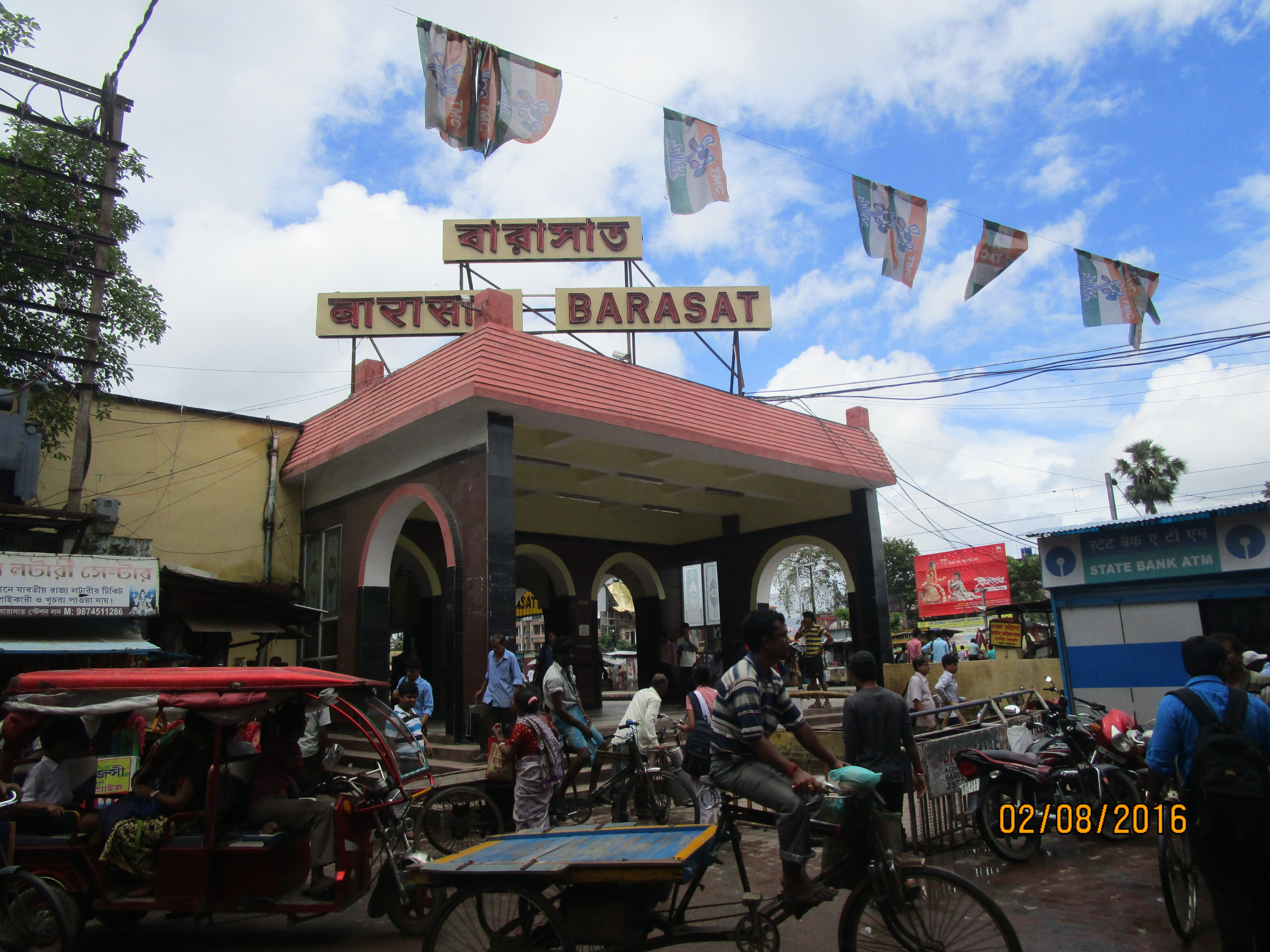
Main entrance of Barasat Junction railway station

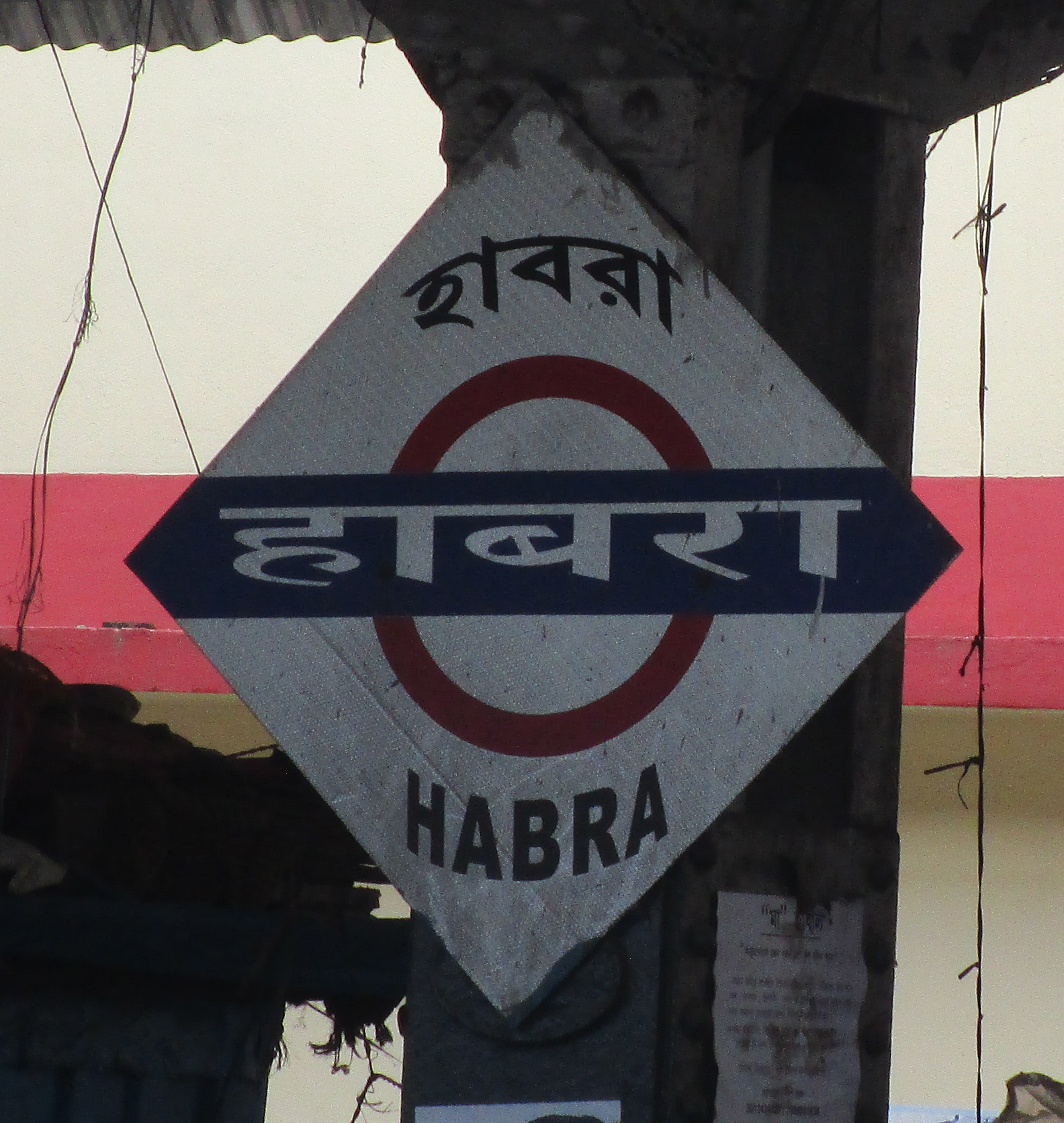
Habra railway station platform board

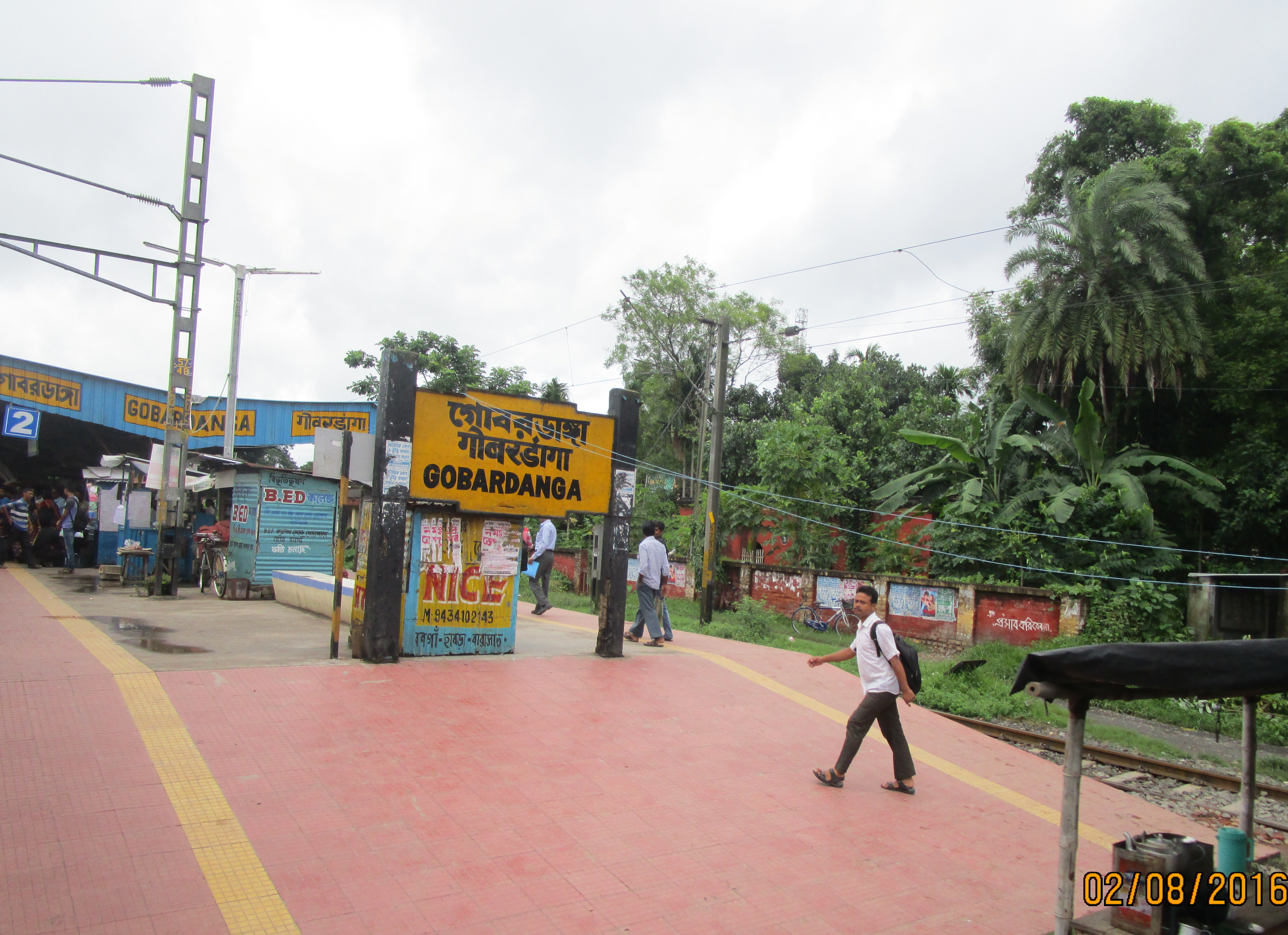
Platform of Gobardanga railway station

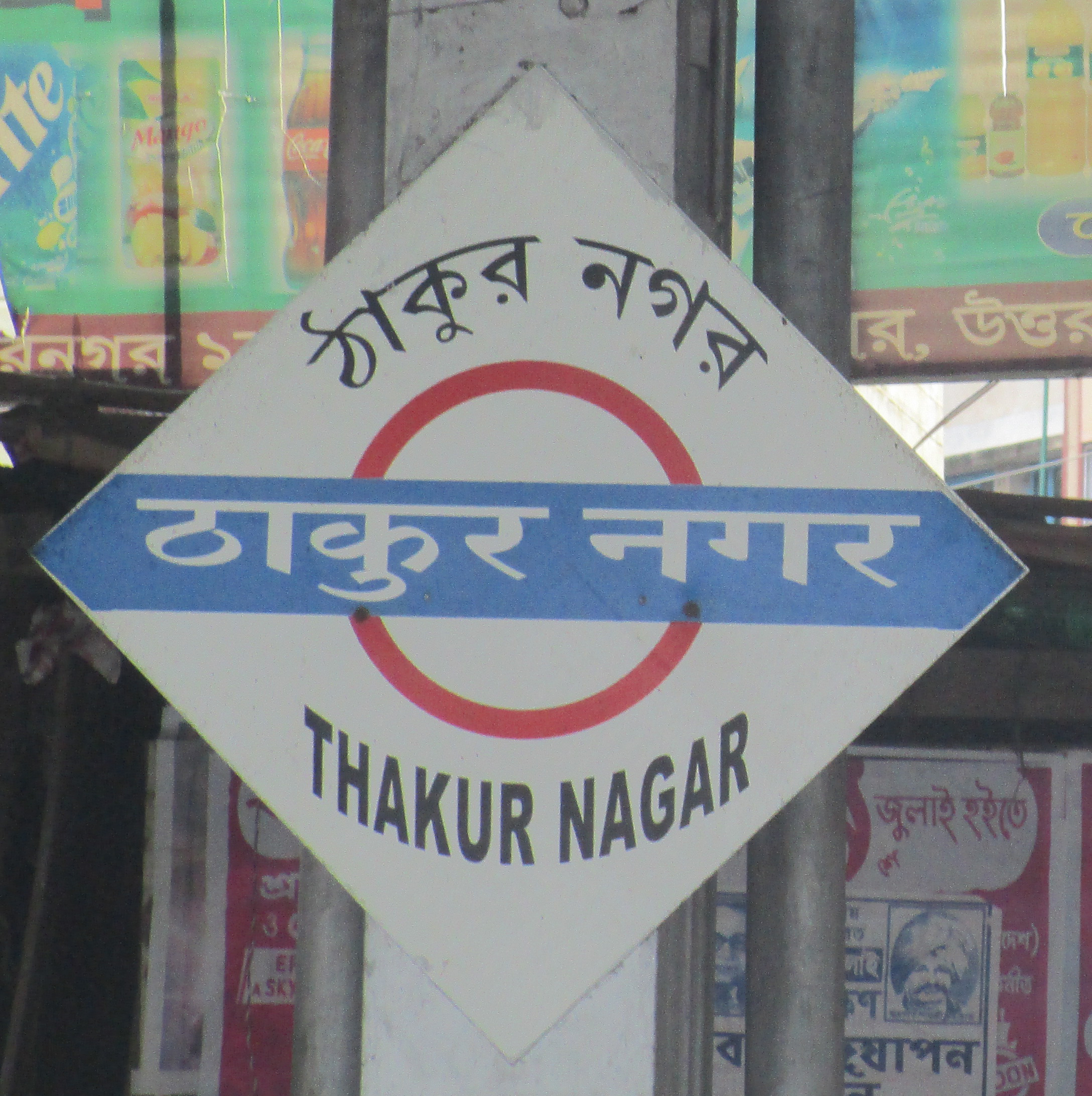
Thakurnagar railway station platform board

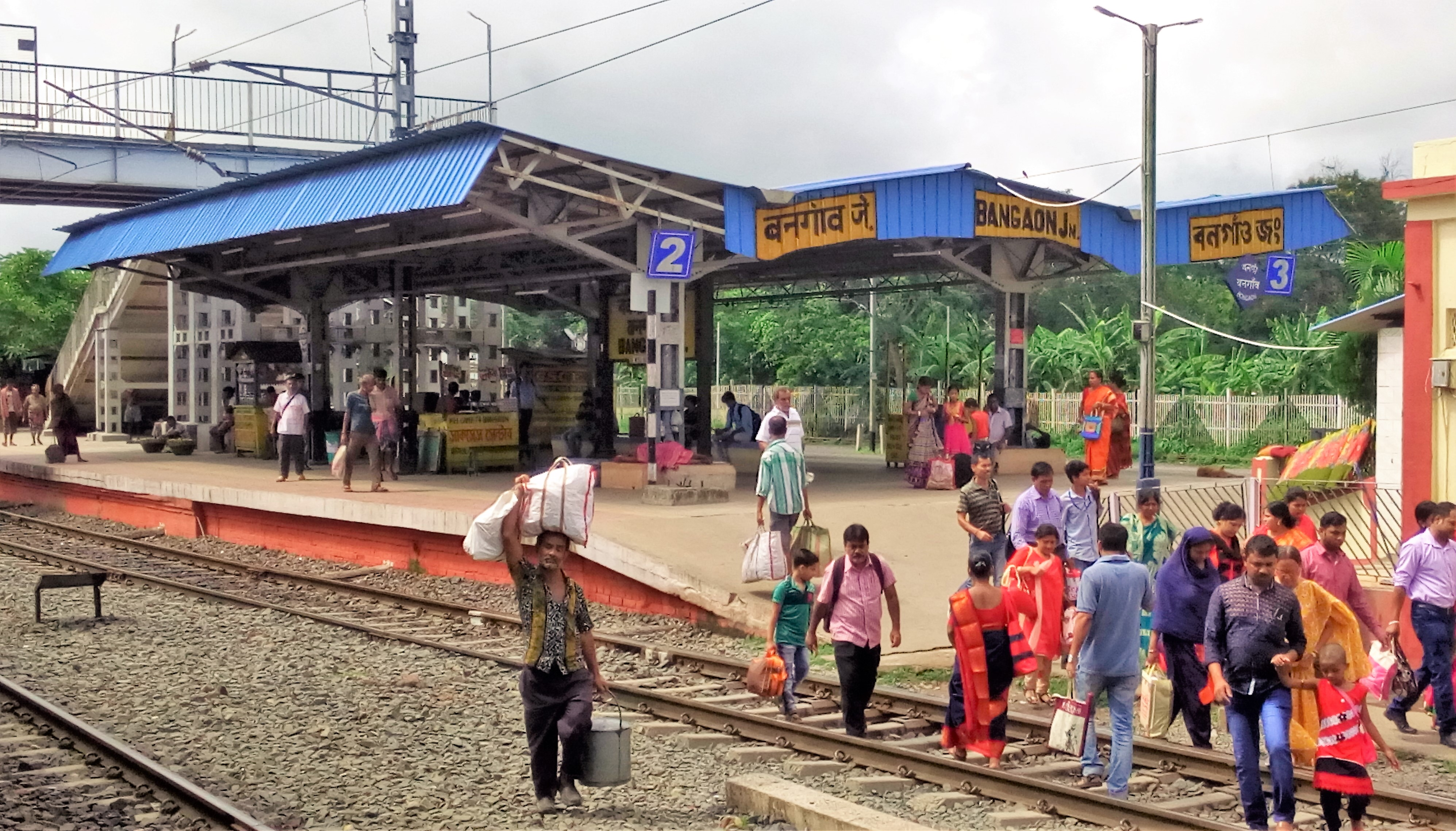
Platform of Bangaon railway station

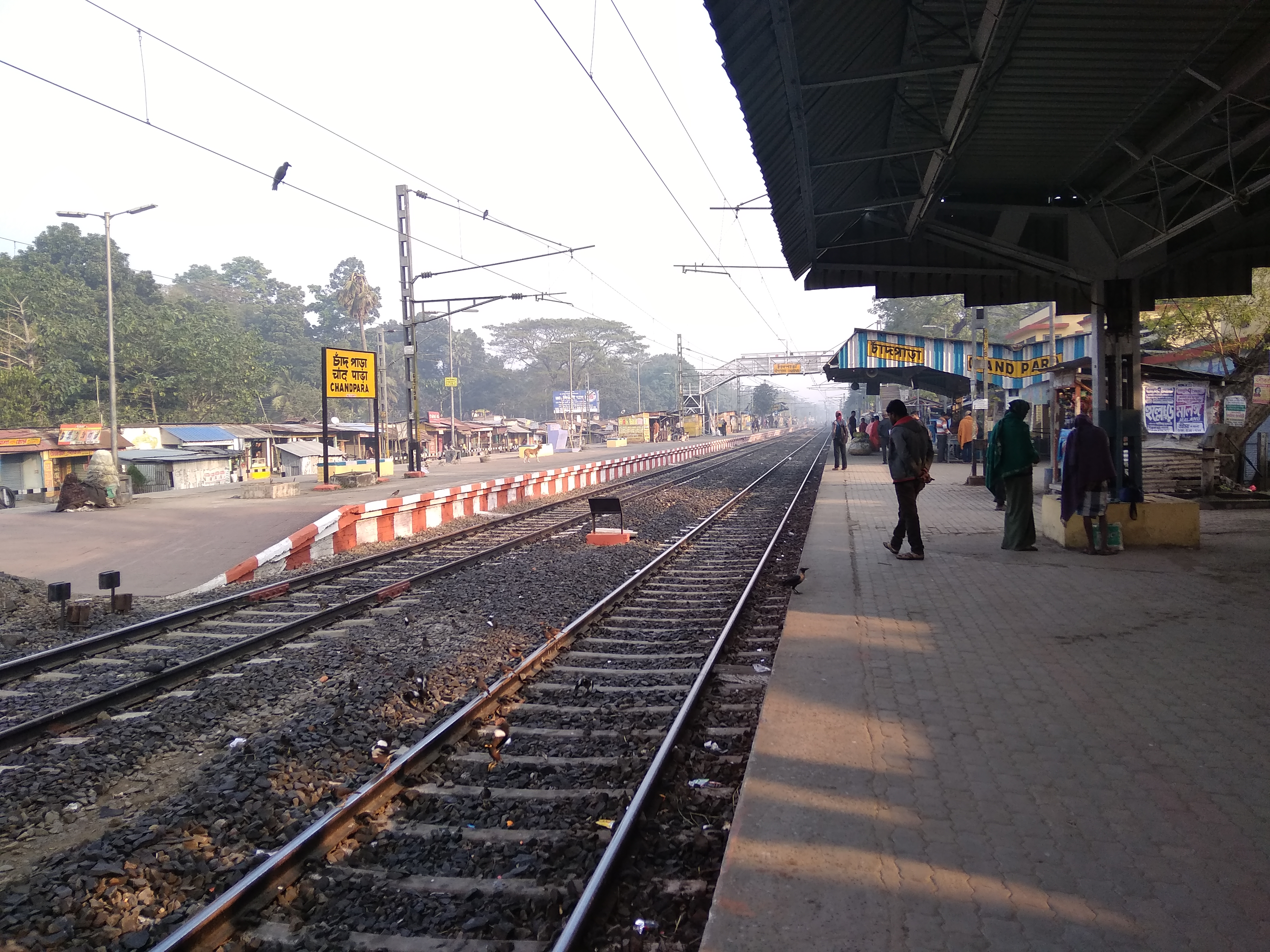
Chandpara railway station

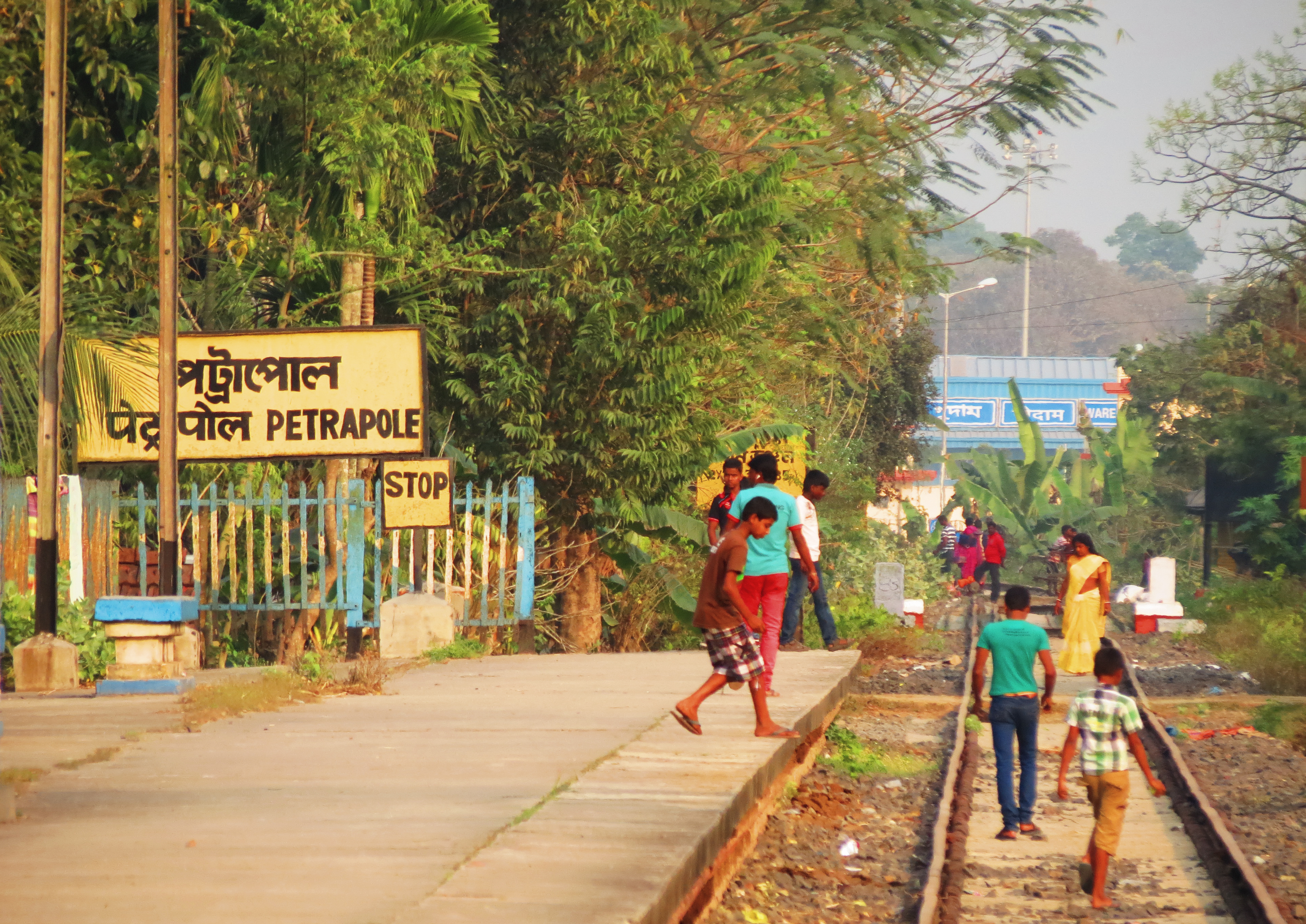
Petrapole railway station
