= Sanhati Halt railway station =

Railway station in West Bengal, India

Sanhati Halt

General information
- Location: Sanhati, North 24 Parganas district, West Bengal; India
- Coordinates: 22.845904°N 88.704545°E
- Elevation: 9 metres (30 ft)
- System: Kolkata Suburban Railway station
- Owner: Indian Railways
- Operator: Eastern Railway
- Line: Sealdah–Hasnabad–Bangaon–Ranaghat line of Kolkata Suburban Railway
- Platforms: 2
- Tracks: 2

Construction
- Structure type: At grade
- Parking: No
- Cycle facilities: No

Other information
- Status: Functional
- Station code: SNHT
- Zone(s): Eastern Railway
- Division(s): Sealdah

History
- Opened: 1906; 120 years ago
- Electrified: 1972; 54 years ago

Services
Preceding station	Kolkata Suburban Railway	Following station
Habra towards Sealdah	Eastern Line Dum Dum–Bangaon branch line	Machhalandapur towards Bangaon Junction
Route map
Location
- Location within West Bengal Location within India

Sanhati Halt railway station is a small railway station in North 24 Parganas district, West Bengal. Its code is SNHT. It serves Sanhati town. The station consists of two platforms. The platforms are not well sheltered. It lacks many facilities including water and sanitation.

== Station ==
=== Location ===
Sanhati Halt railway station is located on Sealdah–Hasnabad–Bangaon–Ranaghat line of Kolkata Suburban Railway. Link between Dum Dum to Khulna now in Bangladesh, via Bangaon was constructed by Bengal Central Railway Company in 1882–84. The Sealah–Dum Dum–Barasat–Ashok Nagar–Bangaon sector was electrified in 1963–64.

== See also ==
- North 24 Parganas district
- Indian Railways
- Sealdah railway station
- Sealdah–Hasnabad–Bangaon–Ranaghat line
- Bangaon Junction railway station
- Transport in West Bengal
- List of railway stations in India
