= Chandpara railway station =

Railway station in West Bengal, India

Chandpara
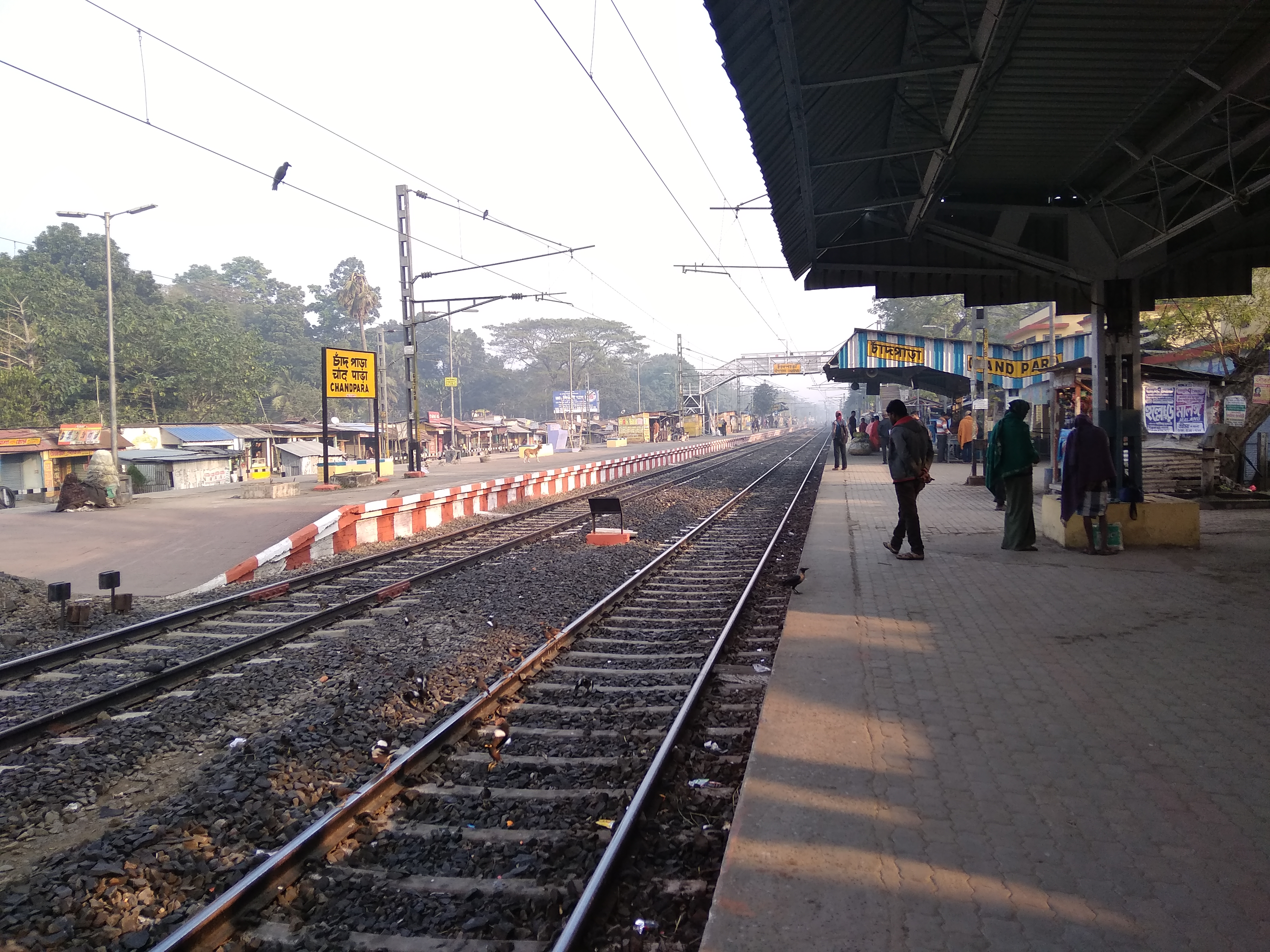
- 1 and 2 no platform of the Chandpara railway station

General information
- Location: Chandpara, North 24 Parganas district, West Bengal; India
- Coordinates: 22.961713°N 88.785168°E
- Elevation: 12 metres (39 ft)
- System: Kolkata Suburban Railway station
- Owner: Indian Railways
- Operator: Eastern Railway
- Line: Sealdah–Hasnabad–Bangaon–Ranaghat line of Kolkata Suburban Railway
- Platforms: 3
- Tracks: 3

Construction
- Structure type: At grade
- Parking: Not available
- Cycle facilities: Not available

Other information
- Status: Functional
- Station code: CDP
- Zone(s): Eastern Railway
- Division(s): Sealdah

History
- Opened: 1906; 120 years ago
- Electrified: 1972; 54 years ago

Services
Preceding station	Kolkata Suburban Railway	Following station
Thakurnagar towards Sealdah	Eastern Line Dum Dum–Bangaon branch line	Bibhuti Bhushan Halt towards Bangaon Junction
Route map
Location
- Location within West Bengal Location within India

Chandpara railway station is part of the Kolkata Suburban Railway system and is under the jurisdiction of Eastern Railway. It is located on the Sealdah–Bongaon line in North 24 Parganas district in West Bengal, India.Distance between Sealdah railway station to chandpara station 67 kilometres (42 mi).

== Station ==
=== Station layout ===
G	Street level	Exit/Entrance & ticket counter
P1	FOB, Side platform, No-1 doors will open on the left/right
P1	Track 1	Towards →Bangaon→ →
P1	Track 2	Towards ←Sealdah← ←
P1	FOB, Island platform, No- 2 doors will open on the left/right
P1	Island platform, No- 3 doors will open on the left/right
P1	Track 3

== See also ==
- North 24 Parganas district
- Indian Railways
- Sealdah railway station
- Sealdah–Hasnabad–Bangaon–Ranaghat line
- Bangaon Junction railway station
- Transport in West Bengal
- List of railway stations in India
