= Petrapole railway station =

Railway station in West Bengal

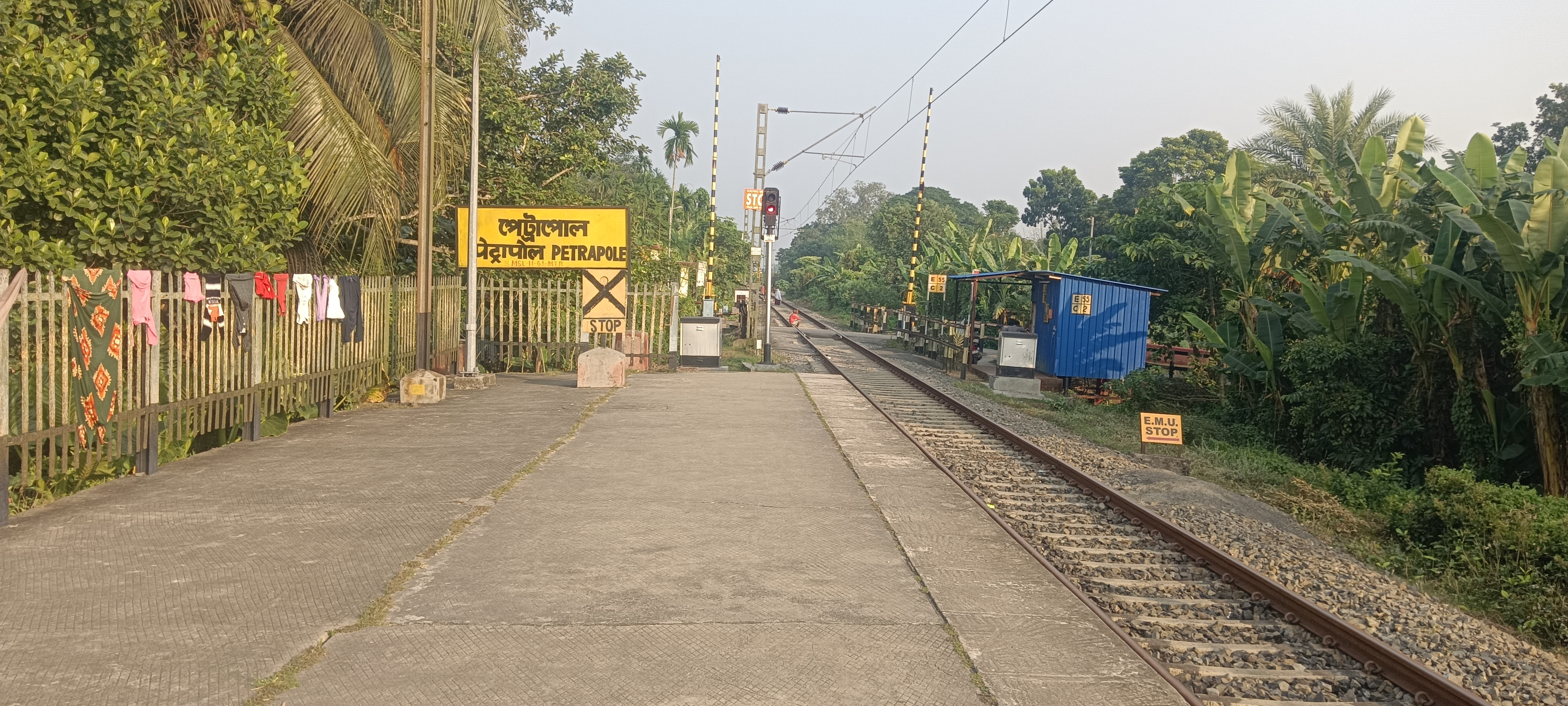
- Petrapole railway station

General information
- Location: Jayantipur, North 24 Parganas district, West Bengal; India
- Coordinates: 23.03771026139523°N 88.86846346945615°E
- Elevation: 13 metres (43 ft)
- System: Indian Railways station
- Owner: Indian Railways
- Operator: Eastern Railway
- Line: Sealdah–Bangaon line
- Platforms: 1
- Tracks: 2

Construction
- Structure type: At grade
- Parking: No
- Cycle facilities: No

Other information
- Status: Functional
- Station code: PTPL
- Zone(s): Eastern Railway
- Division(s): Sealdah

History
- Opened: 1884; 142 years ago
Route map
Key
Location
- Location within West Bengal Location within India

Petrapole railway station is a railway station of the Indian Railways located in the North 24 Parganas district, West Bengal. Its station code is PTPL. It is located near the Indo-Bangladesh border and serves as a major border crossing point for freight trains to Bangladesh, with Benapole being the Bangladesh Railways counterpart.

== History ==
The Bengal Central Railway Company constructed a broad gauge line connecting Dum Dum with Khulna (now in Bangladesh), via Bangaon (108 miles (174 km)) which opened in stages and was completed in 1884. These lines were merged with Eastern Bengal Railway in 1904.

After partition of India in 1947, Petrapole railway station was created as the terminus on the Indian side while the Benapole railway station became the terminus on the Bangladeshi side of the line. The Barisal Express, launched in 1884, from Sealdah to Khulna continued post-partition until rail services between the two countries were suspended due to the Indo-Pakistani War of 1965. Freight services between the two countries were restored for a brief period of two years in 1972 but closed again due to a lack of goods. India and Bangladesh signed an agreement in July 2000 to resume freight services and the first freight train ran across the link on 21 January 2001.

== Services ==
Petrapole serves as the major transit point of goods from India to Bangladesh. It directly connects to the Benapole land port, the largest land port in Bangladesh which is responsible for 90% of the Indian goods imported to Bangladesh.

While initially handling only freight traffic, it became a border checkpoint for passengers after the Bandhan Express was introduced on this line in November 2017. It is a weekly service which traces the old route of the Barisal Express except for having its terminus in the Kolkata railway station instead of the Sealdah railway station.

== See also ==
- North 24 Parganas district
- Benapole railway station
- Sealdah–Bangaon line
- Bangaon Junction railway station
- Transport in West Bengal
