= Hasnabad railway station =

Railway station in West Bengal, India

Hasnabad
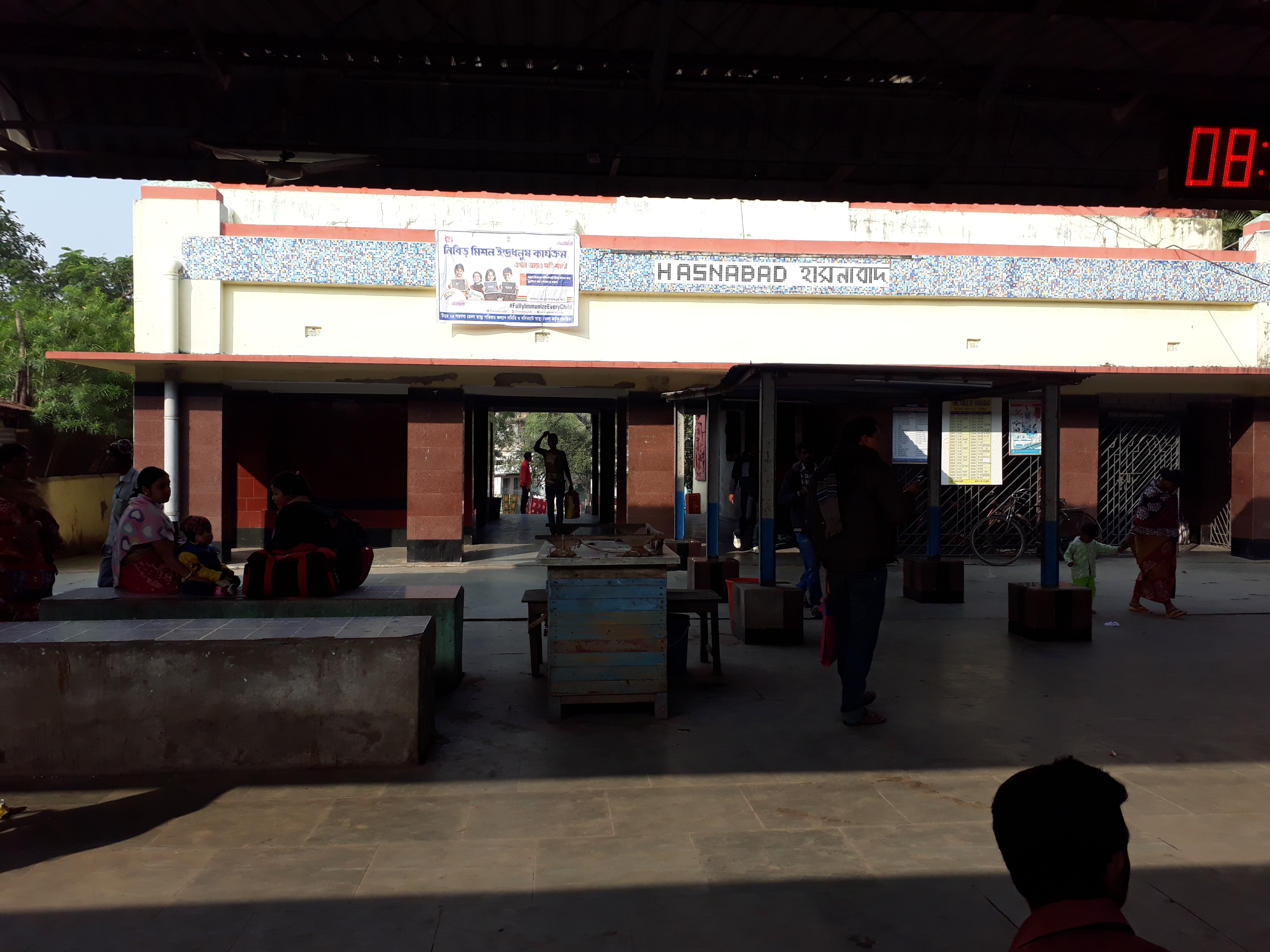
- Hasanabad railway station

General information
- Location: Hasnabad(Taki Municipality Ward No 14), North 24 Parganas, West Bengal; India
- Coordinates: 22°34′17″N 88°54′49″E
- Elevation: 7 metres (23 ft)
- System: Kolkata Suburban Railway station
- Owner: Indian Railways
- Operator: Eastern Railway
- Line: Sealdah–Hasnabad section
- Platforms: 3 (PF1,2 & 3)
- Tracks: 3

Construction
- Structure type: Standard (on ground station)
- Parking: YES
- Cycle facilities: No

Other information
- Status: Functioning
- Station code: HNB
- Division(s): Sealdah

History
- Opened: 1962

Services
Preceding station	Kolkata Suburban Railway	Following station
Taki Road towards Sealdah	Eastern Line Sealdah–Hasnabad line	Terminus
Route map
Location
- Location within West Bengal Location within India

Hasnabad railway station is a Kolkata Suburban Railway station on the Sealdah - Barasat - Basirhat - Hasnabad line. It is located at Hasnabad in Basirhat subdivision of North 24 Parganas district in the Indian state of West Bengal. It serves Hasnabad and the surrounding areas.

== History ==
Sealdah-Basirhat Railway constructed a 762 mm (2 ft 6 in) narrow-gauge line in 1914 as a part of Martin's Light Railways. The line was closed in 1955.

The 33.06 km (21 mi)-long 5 ft 6 in (1,676 mm) broad gauge Sealdah–Basirhat line was constructed between 1957 and 1962, after the construction, this line extended up to Hasnabad.

== Rolling stock ==
Eastern Railway has some WDM-2D locos, which is used on the Sealdah–Hasnabad route amongst others. They were used to haul 8 coach push-pull DEMU trains way back till the complete line was electrified. The DEMU trains had two cabs at either end to control the train. But now they are no longer in use. They have been replaced by BHEL and Jessop EMU rakes, which are currently stabled in Barasat EMU shed. Doubling of this line has been started since 2000.

== Proposed lines ==
The Hasnabad–Machlandapur line is one of the 84 new line projects sent to Planning Commission and the Ghatakpukur-Hasnabad line is one of the 111 new line surveys to be taken up in 2012–13, as per the Railway Budget proposals for 2012–13.
