= Transport in West Bengal =

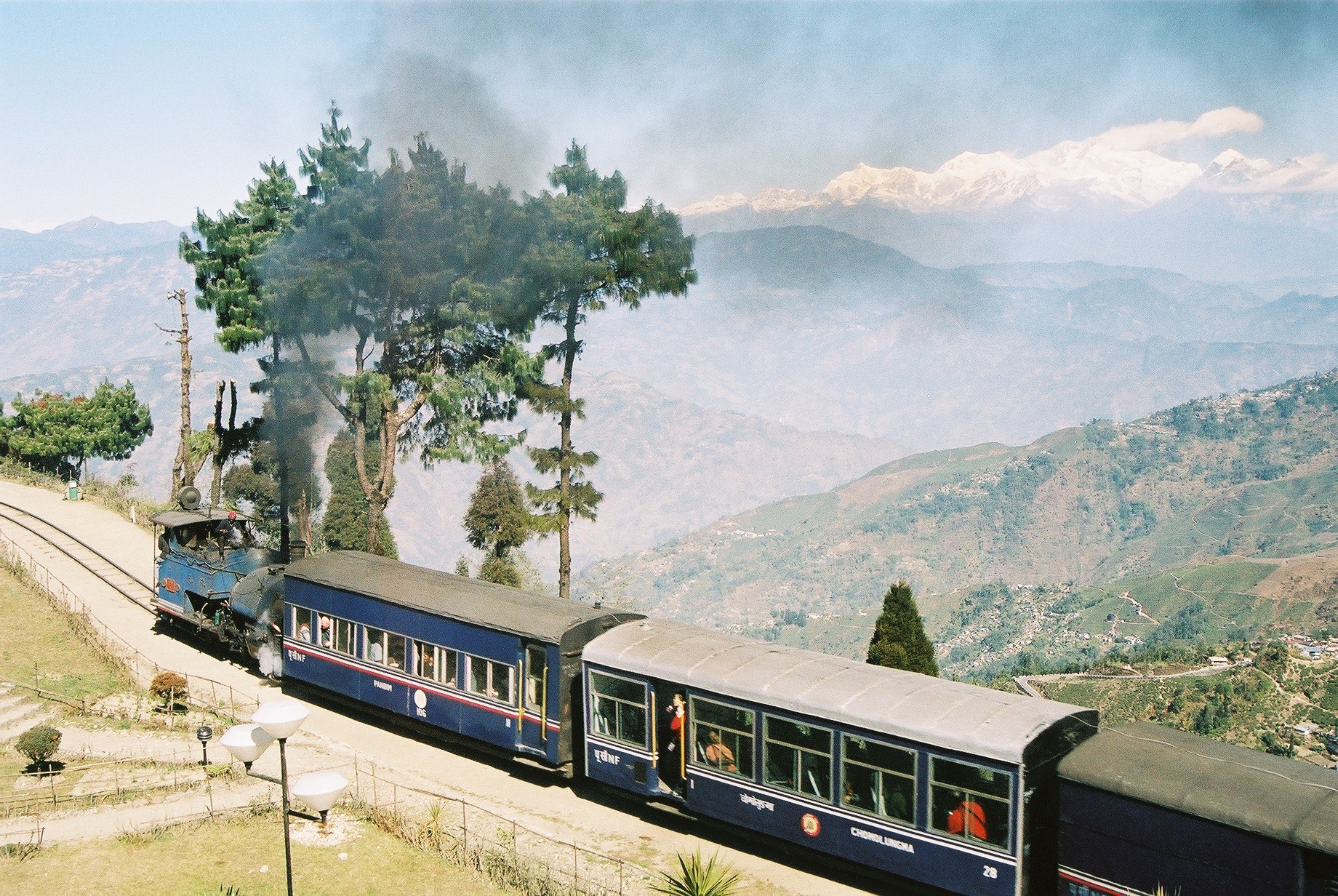
UNESCO World Heritage: Darjeeling Himalayan Railway

Total length of road in West Bengal is 92,023 kilometers. Among these national highway are 2,377 kilometers (1,477 miles), and state highway 2,393 kilometers (1,487 miles). The road density of the state is 103.69 kilometers per 100 square kilometers (166.92 miles per 100 square miles); the national density is 74.7 kilometers per 100 square kilometers (per more than 100 miles in a square mile). The average speed of the road in the state is between 40 and 50 kilometers/hour (25–31 miles/hour). The speed in the village and urban areas is between 20 and 25 kilometers/hour (12–16 miles/hour). This is the main reason the road is low and lack of maintenance. The total length of the railway line in the state is 3,825 kilometers (2,377 miles). Indian Railways' Eastern Railway zone and South Eastern Railway zone Headquarter are located in Kolkata. The railways on the north side of the state Under the Northeast Frontier Railway. Kolkata Metro is India's first underground metro rail service. The Darjeeling Himalayan Railway, part of the Northeast Frontier Railway, is a UNESCO World Heritage Site.

== Road transport ==
Spread of National and State Highways in West Bengal

The total length of the road route of West Bengal is 92,023 km. National highway is 2578 km and the state highway 2,393 km. 87,052 km is the district road and rural road. Industrial area and cities are well-connected with port of the state by national and state highway.

Road type	Length (km)
National Highway	2,578
State Highway	2,393
Expressway	121
District road, rural road	87,052
Total	92,144

Expressway is the fastest communication system in this state. The main expressways of West Bengal are Durgapur Expressway, Kalyani Expressway, Kona Expressway and Belghoria Expressway.

National Highway 19 ( National Highway 2) has moved from Kolkata to Delhi. National Highway No. 6 passes through Kolkata from Kharagpur to Surat and Mumbai. National Highway No. 4 connects North Bengal with South Bengal. Currently, the expansion of National Road No. 34 Road work is progressing in four lanes. National Highway No. 35 with Kolkata, Habra, Chandpara Petrapole Port of Bongaon on the border city well connect. Among other national highways, notable number – 31 no., No. 55, no. 60 no., No. 31 no., No. 31, 177, 116 no., Among them, national road connecting Haldia port with Middheda 6 was added to the national road. 6, and 60 National Road Gold Quadrilateral Road Project. Apart from this, the National Highway No. 31 is part of north–south and East-West Corridor.

There are more than 15 state roads in West Bengal. The Government of West Bengal is constructing North–South Road Corridor for fast communication with Haldia Port with North Bengal.

=== Bus service ===
Bus is a very inevitable mode of transport for most people in West Bengal. This mode of transport is not limited by rail or any specific track, it is also available at any remote location in the state. Buses travel in both city and village. Even in West Bengal, there are some remote villages where only one bus service is provided throughout the day. State-run and private buses are providing daily services to millions of people. Although most of the buses run under private ownership, public buses are even more comfortable with the larger space, but they are much longer than private buses. They are classified in different ways; For example, a limited-stop bus (sitting in limited space), Morning–Sundown bus (morning-bus running till sunset), specials, express services etc. There are also different types of privately run buses; For example, – minibus and chartered and small buses may also be. The rent of West Bengal buses is very affordable. With a lot of stops in the middle, it's a very convenient way to travel.

== Rail transport ==
- Kolkata Suburban Railway
- Kolkata Metro
- Kolkata Trams
- Darjeeling Himalayan Railway

== Aviation ==
- Airports in West Bengal

== Waterway and Port ==
Kolkata Port is a major port and only major river port in India. Calcutta Port Trust is responsible for the Kolkata and Haldia Dock. The passenger transport service from Port of Kolkata to Port Blair Port in Andaman and Nicobar Islands and shipping services of India and Outer Port are being provided by Shipping Corporation of India. In the southern part of the state, especially in the Sundarban region, the main transport system is boat transport.

In West Bengal, the barge or small vessels from Haldia Port to Farakka Port transported. These vessels transport the coal to Farakka thermal power plant by National Waterway 1.

Sagar Port is a proposed seaport which is to be in Sagar Island.
