= Sealdah–Ranaghat–Gede line =

Railway route in West Bengal, India

Sealdah–Naihati–Gede line including Naihati–Bandel and Kalyani–Kalyani Simanta branch lines
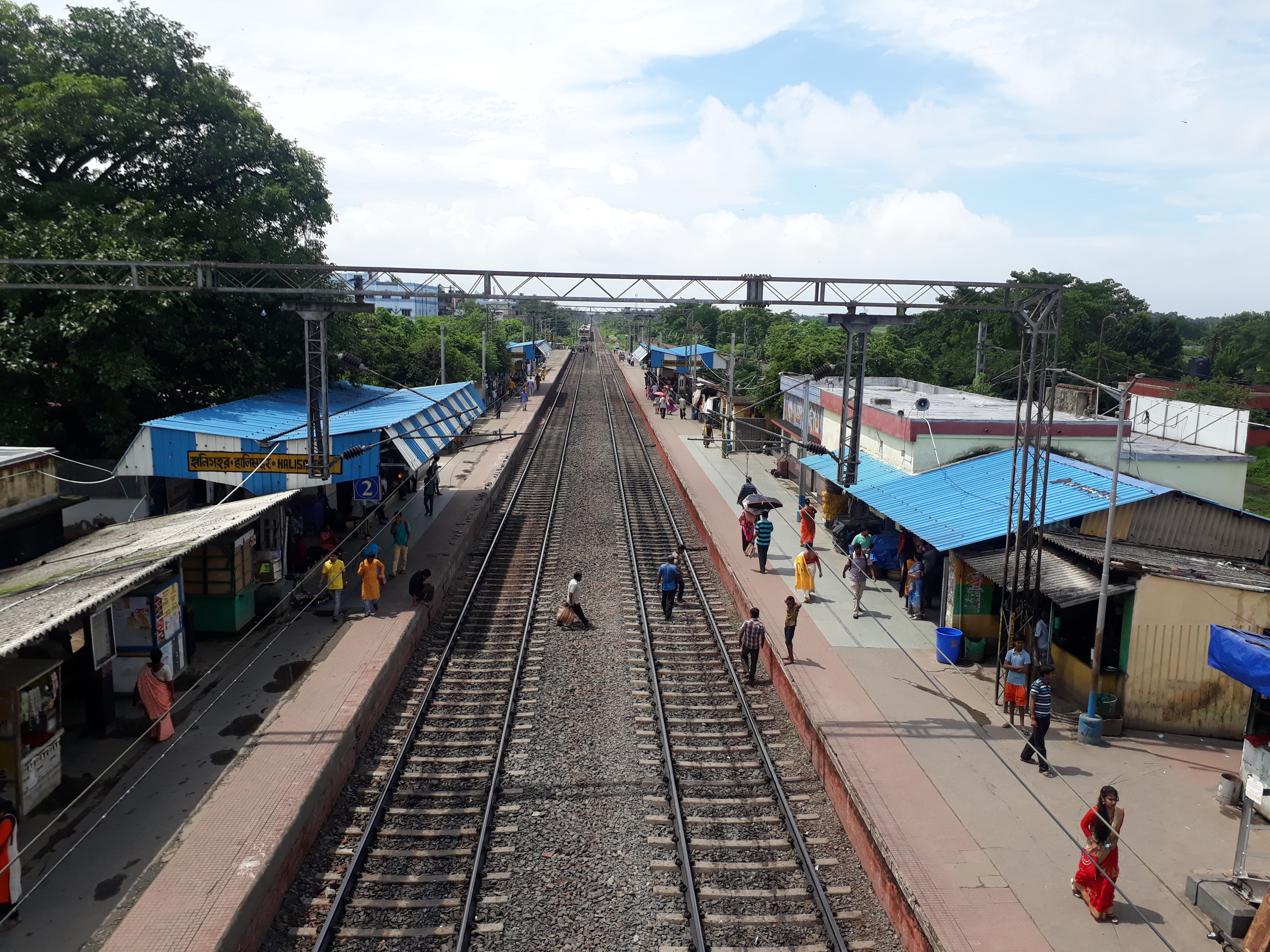
- Halisahar railway station

Overview
- Status: Operational
- Owner: Indian Railway
- Locale: West Bengal
- Termini: Sealdah; Gede
- Stations: 45
- Website: Eastern Railway

Service
- Type: Suburban Railway
- System: Kolkata Suburban Railway
- Operator: Eastern Railway
- Depot(s): Narkeldanga EMU Carshed; Ranaghat EMU Carshed
- Daily ridership: 1 Million

History
- Opened: 1862; 164 years ago

Technical
- Line length: 117 km (73 mi)
- Number of tracks: Quadruple line: Sealdah–Naihati Triple Line: Naihati–Kalyani Double line: Naihati–Bandel, Kalyani–Ranaghat–Gede Single line: Kalyani–Kalyani Simanta
- Character: At grade
- Track gauge: 5 ft 6 in (1,676 mm) broad gauge
- Electrification: 25 kV overhead line
- Operating speed: up to 100 km/h (62 mph)

The Sealdah–Ranaghat–Gede line connects the Sealdah Main and North terminus of Kolkata and Gede of Nadia district of West Bengal, India, with Naihati and Ranaghat serving as major junction points. Once a part of the old Calcutta–Siliguri main line, today it is a busy suburban section of the Kolkata Suburban Railway's Sealdah North section connecting the North 24 Parganas and Nadia districts with Kolkata. It is under the jurisdiction of the Sealdah railway division of the Eastern Railway zone of the Indian Railways.

The Naihati Jn –Bandel Jn branch line connects this line with the Howrah–Bardhaman main line and Bandel–Katwa line through the Sampreeti Bridge, and previously the Jubilee Bridge, over the Hooghly river. The Kalyani–Kalyani Simanta branch line caters to the Kalyani town and industrial area of the Nadia district.

== Services ==
Once a part of the old Calcutta–Siliguri main line with prestigious trains such as Darjeeling Mail, East Bengal Express and East Bengal Mail running through it, today the section is primarily a suburban section with a total of 231 daily and 187 Sunday EMU services serving the Sealdah–Ranaghat section. A further 40 EMU services also run between Sealdah and Gede via Ranaghat junction. A majority of the services are served by 9-car EMU rakes from the Narkeldanga EMU Carshed. They are also served with a few 12-car EMU rakes from the Ranaghat EMU Carshed as well.

Gede railway station serves as a major international transit point for freight and passengers to Bangladesh with the Darsana railway station serving as its Bangladeshi counterpart. Maitree Express, the direct international service connecting Kolkata with the Kamalapur station of Dhaka, the capital of Bangladesh, stops at Gede which previously served as an immigration checkpoint before crossing over to Darsana in Bangladesh.

Gunny bales, a major freight export commodity handled in this section, are loaded in Titagarh and Naihati, two historically important centres for jute mills in the area. Containers for export are loaded at the Cossipore Road Goods Shed which is connected to the line via the Kolkata Circular Railway. The major import commodities handled by this line are cement, fertilizer, food grains, containers, POL and coal for thermal power plants. Transportation and heavy engineering equipment are other major export commodities handled by this line with companies such as Electrosteel Castings, Titagarh Wagons and Texmaco Rail & Engineering having sidings along the line. The primary manufacturing unit of the Titagarh Wagons company is also located in Titagarh and has a capacity to produce 4100 wagons per year.

The Naihati–Bandel branch line connects Sealdah with the west bank of the Hooghly and thus the rest of the country and acts as a transit route for major long-distance trains such as the Tirhut Express, Mithilanchal Express and Purvanchal Express bound to and from Sealdah and Kolkata railway stations. The branch line is also served by 38 Daily EMU services between Naihati and Bandel junctions.

== History ==
=== Eastern Bengal Railway ===
The Eastern Bengal Railway (reporting mark :EBR) company was formed in 1857 for the construction and working of a line from Calcutta to Dacca, with a branch to Jessore. The construction of the 112 mi (180 km) long broad gauge line began in 1859 and was completed in stages up to Kushtia by 1864 but the planned branch to Jessore was not built. The Calcutta terminus of the line was initially constructed as a tin roof shed in Sealdah, a neighbourhood of Calcutta in 1862. In 1869 the original station building at Sealdah, designed by Walter Granville was built and opened.

The company also acquired a steam vessel service operating between Kushtia and Dacca on the Padma river. In 1871 the line was extended from Poradaha to a new ferry terminal at Goalundo Ghat, about 45 mi (72 km) east of Kushtia and reducing the river trip to Dacca. and becoming the main line of the Eastern section of EBR. With the successful construction and opening of the Hardinge Bridge in 1915 and gauge conversion of the Santahar–Parbatipur–Siliguri line from 1924 to 1926, the Calcutta–Siliguri broad gauge line was completed and became the main line of the Eastern section of EBR.

The Eastern Bengal Railway, which operated east of the Hooghly, was linked with the East Indian Railway, which operated west of the river, when Jubilee Bridge, linking Bandel and Naihati was opened in 1887 as part of the Naihati Branch railway of the East Indian Railway. In 1932 a shorter route to Barddhaman from Calcutta was realised through the construction of the Calcutta Chord link line via the Willingdon Bridge (now renamed as Vivekananda Setu) over the Hooghly river.

A vivid description of the railway system of the Nadia district, including the Sealdah–Gede line is provided in the Bengal District Gazetteer of 1910 as follows:

"The district is now (1909) very well served with railways. About 170 miles of the Eastern Bengal State Railway, all broad gauge, lie within its borders. The main line from Calcutta to Siliguri passes through the district, roughly from south to north; the distance from Kanchrapara on the southern boundary to Damukdia on the Padma is about 92 miles, and this section has 21 stations. The Lal Gola branch takes off from Ranaghat junction; it passes in a north-westerly direction; the portion within the district is about 48 miles in length, and there are 8 stations upon it. This branch traverses the Kalantar, which is the tract that is most liable to famine in the district and generally contains the lowest stock of food grains. In the 1896-97 famine the supply of food suddenly gave out in this tract, and, in the absence of the railway, which had not then been constructed, the greatest difficulty was experienced in importing enough grain to prevent deaths from starvation. If another famine should unfortunately occur, this line will save the District Officer much of the anxiety which his predecessors had to bear. The central branch of the Eastern Bengal State Railway also takes off from Ranaghat junction; only about nine miles of it (with two stations) lies within the boundaries of the district; it passes in an easterly direction through the Ranaghat subdivision into the Bangaon subdivision of the Jessore district. The Goalundo branch takes off from Poradah"

With the establishment of the first jute mill in India, the Acland Mill in Rishra in 1855 to having around 38 companies operating 30,685 looms, exporting a billion yards of cloth and over 450 million bags by 1910, the growth of the jute trade and industry around Kolkata was rapid. As a result, numerous jute mill sidings popped up around the line. By 1939, there were 68,377 looms, concentrated mainly on the areas near the Hooghly like Titagarh, Bhadreswar, Bauria, Kankinara, Naihati, Shyamnagar, Jagaddal and Budge Budge and these mills alone proved able to supply the world demand.

The Kanchrapara Railway Workshop was established by EBR in 1863. It was developed as an integrated shop to carry out periodic repairs and overhauls to steam locomotives, wooden body carriage and wagons.

In 1942, EBR was merged with the Assam Bengal Railway (reporting mark :ABR) to form the Bengal and Assam Railway (reporting mark :B&AR). In 1947, with the partition of India, B&AR was divided into three parts with the 5 ft 6 in (1,676 mm) broad gauge lines in West Bengal being transferred to the East Indian Railway under the Sealdah railway division. Gede railway station became the terminus of the line on the Indian side whereas Darsana railway station became the terminus on the East Pakistani side.

The Calcutta terminus was renamed as the Sealdah railway station post the independence of India in 1947.

=== Eastern Railway ===
Sealdah–Ranaghat–Gede line map

On 14 April 1952, with the reorganisation of the various railway zones under Indian Railways, the Eastern Railway zone was formed with the Sealdah division coming under its jurisdiction.

With the electrification of the line, starting from 1962, the Kanchrapara Railway Workshop was remodeled for Periodic Overhauling (POH) of electric locomotives and suburban EMU trains, with the first of such overhauled locomotive & EMU units being turned out at 1965.

Post the partition of India the jute industry suffered a major setback as most of the jute fields for producing raw jute was located in East Pakistan whereas most of the jute mills for processing the raw jute were located near Kolkata in India thus leading to the slow decline of the jute mills of the area.

Even after partition, two rail services namely the East Bengal Express, from Sealdah to Goalundo Ghat and East Bengal Mail from Sealdah to Parbatipur Junction, carrying both freight and passengers continued, with Gede and Darsana serving as custom check points, till 1965 when the services were snapped following the Indo-Pakistani War of 1965.

While freight services were briefly restored for a period of 2 years from 1972 following the liberation of Bangladesh, passenger services were not restored.

In 1979, the Chandmari Halt railway station was renamed as the Kalyani railway station and the Kalyani–Kalyani Simanta branch line was opened for traffic.

To offset the heavy traffic of long-distance trains bound to Sealdah, the Chitpur railway station, a part of the Kolkata Circular Railway, was remodeled and merged with the Ultadanga Road railway station to build the Kolkata railway station. It was opened for traffic on 30 January 2006.

As a result of talks that were held between the Indian and Bangladeshi governments to revive passenger service between the two countries via the Gede–Darsana route since 2001, the Maitree Express service between Kolkata and Dhaka was started on the occasion of the Bengali New Year (Bengali: পয়লা বৈশাখ) on 14 April 2008.

== Tracks ==
The Sealdah–Naihati section of the line is a quadruple line section, the Naihati-Kalyani sections is a triple line section, where as the Naihati–Bandel and Ranaghat–Gede sections are double line sections respectively. The Kalyani–Kalyani Simanta branch line is a single line section. The Kalyani–Ranaghat section is planned to be upgraded to a triple line section.

The Sealdah–Ranaghat–Gede track is classified as a C-class track, which is not a speed classification but one used for suburban sections of metropolitan areas.

== Electrification ==
The Sealdah–Ranaghat section of the line was electrified by October 1963. The Bandel–Naihati section was electrified in 1965. The Kalyani–Kalyani Simanta branch line was electrified right away after construction in 1979–80. The Ranaghat–Gede section of the line was electrified in 1997-98 beginning EMU services on the line.

== EMU Carshed ==
The Sealdah–Ranaghat section of the line is primarily served by 9-car EMU rakes from the Narkeldanga EMU Carshed. They are also served with some few 12-car EMU rakes from Ranaghat EMU Carshed especially in the Ranaghat–Gede section.

While the section was initially served by the Narkeldanga EMU carshed which opened on 1963, due to the increasing traffic requirements in the Ranaghat–Gede, Ranaghat–Bangaon, Ranaghat–Shantipur–Krishnanagar City and Ranaghat–Lalgola sections the Ranaghat EMU carshed was commissioned in 2007.

As of January 2024, the Narkeldanga carshed had 28 9-car EMU rakes, a few of which served the Sealdah South section mostly via the Circular line, while rest served the Sealdah North section lines. The Ranaghat EMU carshed, as of January 2022 contains 1 9-car EMU rake, 16 12-car EMU rakes (of which 1 is a 3 phase EMU) and 8 12-car MEMU rakes. Four of the 12-car MEMU rakes are ICF three phase IGBT based rakes while the rest are the RCF conventional rakes.

Now conventional and 3 phase Emu rakes of Ranaghat, Barasat and Narkeldanga Carshed served this section.

317** series :- Ranaghat Gede Local (UP and DN) 319** series :- Sealdah Gede Local (UP and DN)

== Routes and stations ==
=== Stations ===
Names in bold indicate that the station is a major stop or an important interchange/terminal station.

==== Sealdah–Ranaghat–Gede main line ====
Sealdah–Ranaghat–Gede main line
#	Distance from Sealdah Main and North (km)	Station Name	Station Code	Connections	Station Category
1	0	**Sealdah Main and North**	SDAH	Sealdah South section	NSG-1
2	2	Kankurgachi Road Junction	KGK	Circular line	HG-3
3	5	**Bidhannagar Road**	BNXR	–	SG-2
4	8	**Dum Dum Junction**	DDJ	Sealdah–Bangaon line / Calcutta Chord link line / Kolkata Metro Blue Line (Dum Dum metro station)	SG-2
5	13	Belgharia	BLH	–	SG-2
6	15	Agarpara	AGP	–	SG-3
7	17	Sodpur	SEP	–	SG-2
8	20	Khardaha	KDH	–	SG-2
9	22	Titagarh	TGH	–	SG-3
10	24	**Barrackpore**	BP	–	SG-2
11	26	Palta	PTF	–	SG-3
12	28	Ichhapur	IP	–	SG-3
13	31	**Shyamnagar**	SNR	–	SG-2
14	34	Jagaddal	JGDL	–	SG-3
15	36	Kankinara	KNR	–	SG-3
16	39	**Naihati Junction**	NH	Naihati–Bandel branch line	NSG-2
17	43	Halisahar	HLR	Naihati–Bandel branch line	SG-3
18	45	Kanchrapara Workshop Gate	KPAW	–	HG-3
19	46	Kanchrapara	KPA	–	SG-3
20	49	**Kalyani**	KYI	Kalyani–Kalyani Simanta branch line	SG-3
21	54	Madanpur	MPJ	–	SG-3
22	58	Simurali	SMX	–	SG-3
23	61	Palpara	PXR	–	SG-3
24	63	**Chakdaha**	CDH	–	SG-2
25	69	Payradanga	PDX	–	SG-3
26	74	**Ranaghat Junction**	RHA	Ranaghat–Bangaon line / Ranaghat–Krishnanagar City–Lalgola line	SG-2
27	78	Bankimnagar Halt	BNKA	–	HG-3
28	80	Panchberia Halt	PNCB	–	HG-3
29	83	Aranghata	AG	–	SG-3
30	87	Bahirgachhi Halt	BHGH	–	HG-3
31	89	Shantinagar Halt	SNTR	–	HG-3
32	91	Bhayna Halt	BHNA	–	HG-3
33	94	Bagula	BGL	–	SG-3
34	97	Mayurhat Halt	MYHT	–	HG-3
35	100	Tarak Nagar Halt	TNX	–	HG-3
36	106	Majhdia	MIJ	–	SG-3
37	112	Banpur	BPN	–	SG-3
38	114	Harish Nagar Halt	HRSR	–	HG-3
39	117	**Gede**	GEDE	–	SG-3

==== Naihati–Bandel branch line ====
Naihati–Bandel branch line
#	Distance from Naihati (km)	Station Name	Station Code	Connections	Station Category
1	0	**Naihati Junction**	NH	Sealdah–Ranaghat–Gede main line	NSG-2
2	3	Garifa	GFAE	–	SG-3
3	4	Hooghly Ghat	HYG	–	SG-3
4	8	**Bandel Junction**	BDC	Howrah–Bardhaman main line / Bandel–Katwa line	NSG-3

==== Kalyani–Kalyani Simanta branch line ====
Kalyani–Kalyani Simanta branch line
#	Distance from Kalyani (km)	Station Name	Station Code	Connections	Station Category
1	0	**Kalyani**	KYI	Sealdah–Ranaghat–Gede main line	SG-3
2	2	Kalyani Silpanchal	KLYS	–	SG-3
3	4	Kalyani Ghoshpara	KLYG	–	SG-3
4	7	**Kalyani Simanta**	KLYM	–	SG-3

== Planned extensions ==
The Aranghata–Duttapulia extension between Aranghata and Duttapulia of Nadia district was proposed in the railway budget of 2011.

== Gallery ==
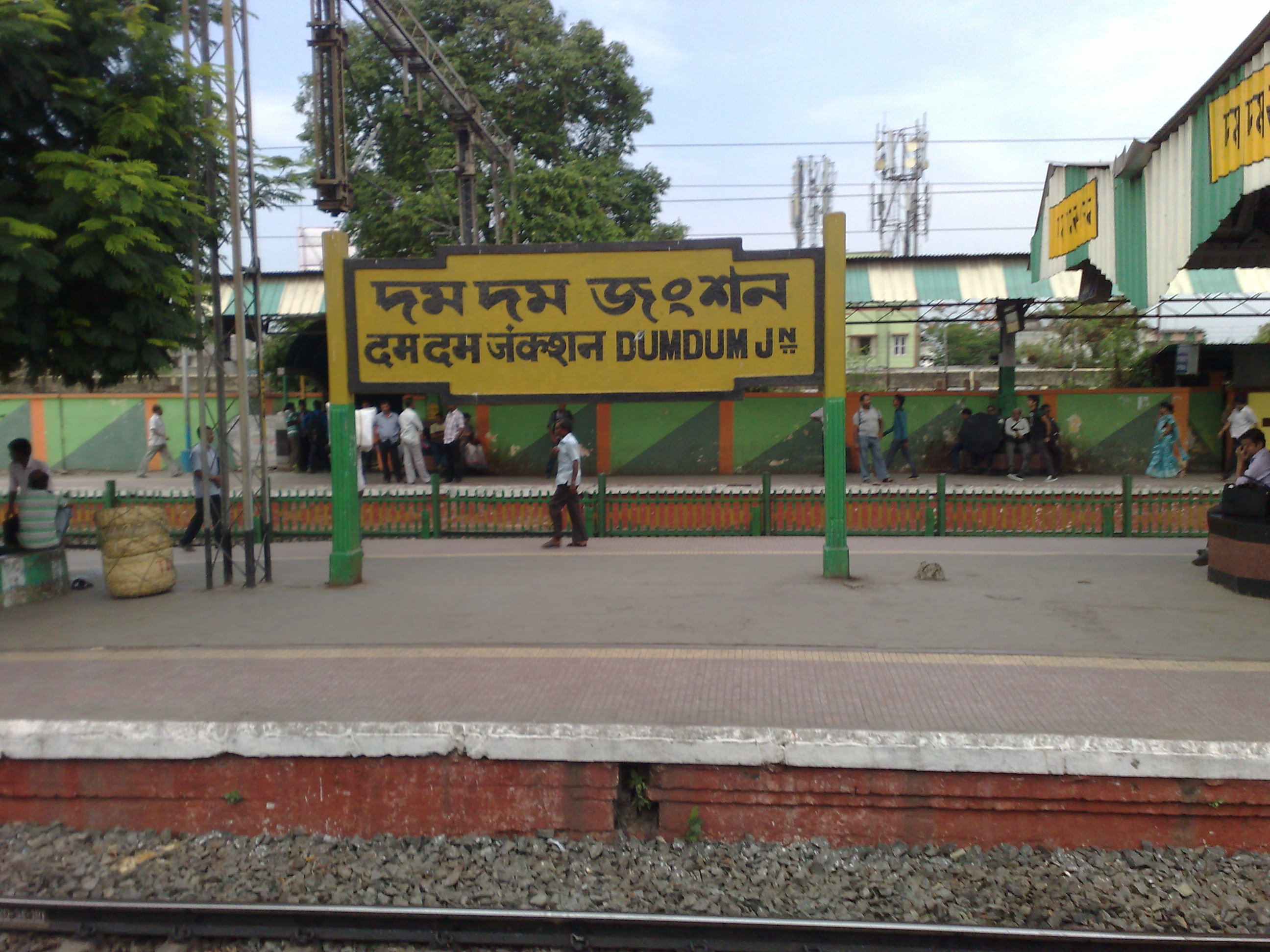
Dum Dum Junction platform board

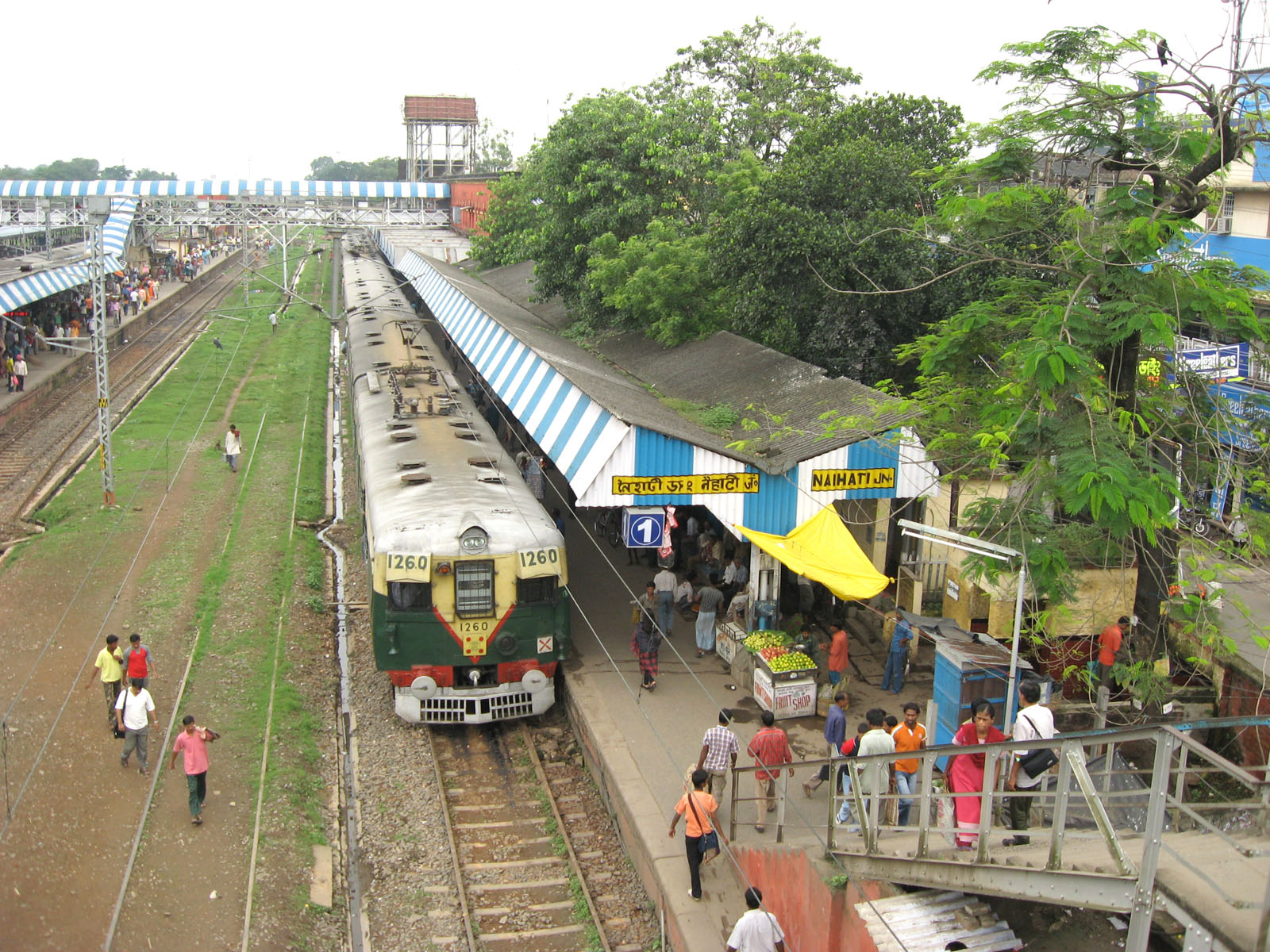
A suburban EMU train arriving at Naihati Junction

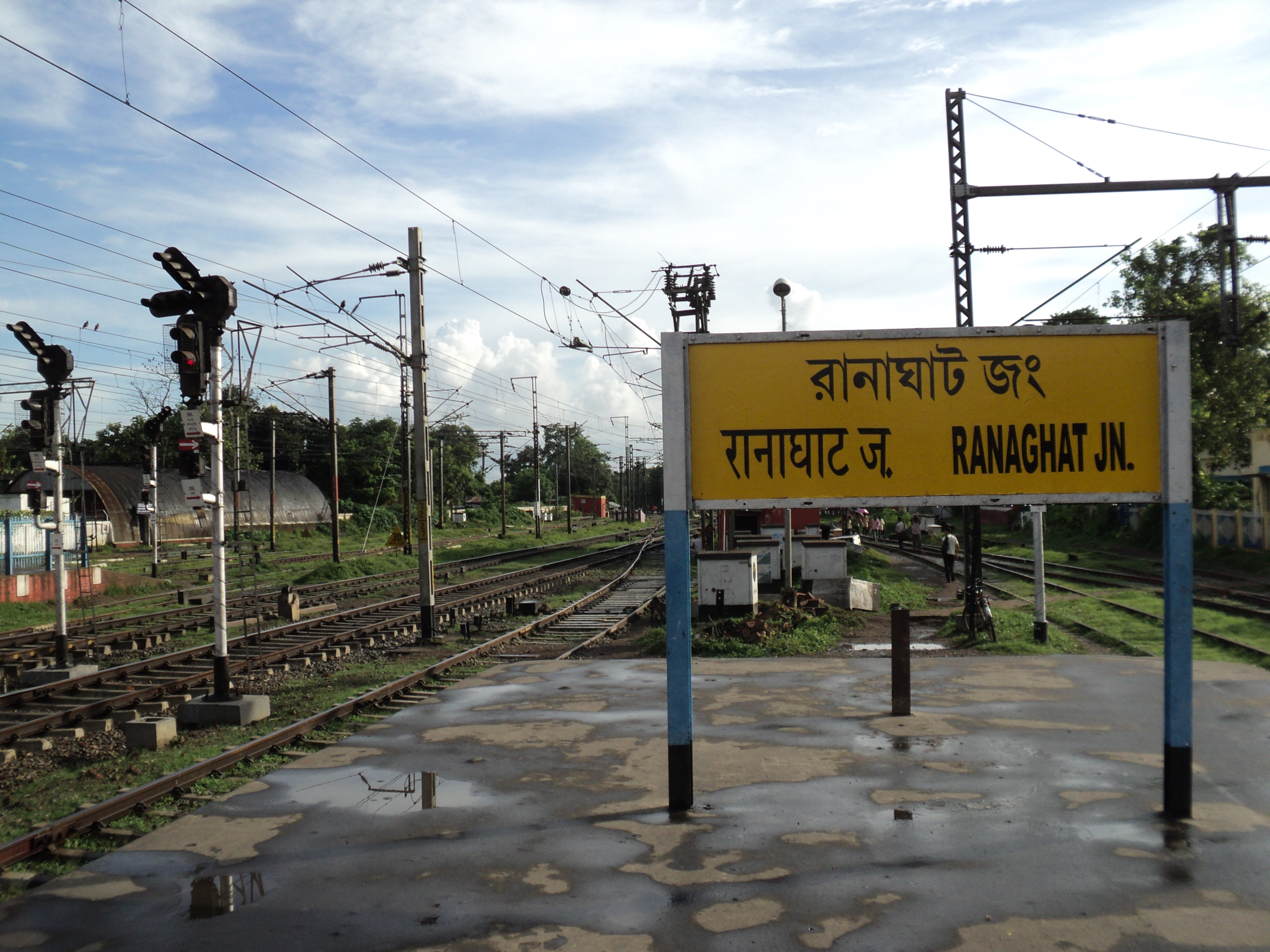
Station Board at Ranaghat Junction
