= Transport between India and Bangladesh =

Transport links between India and Bangladesh

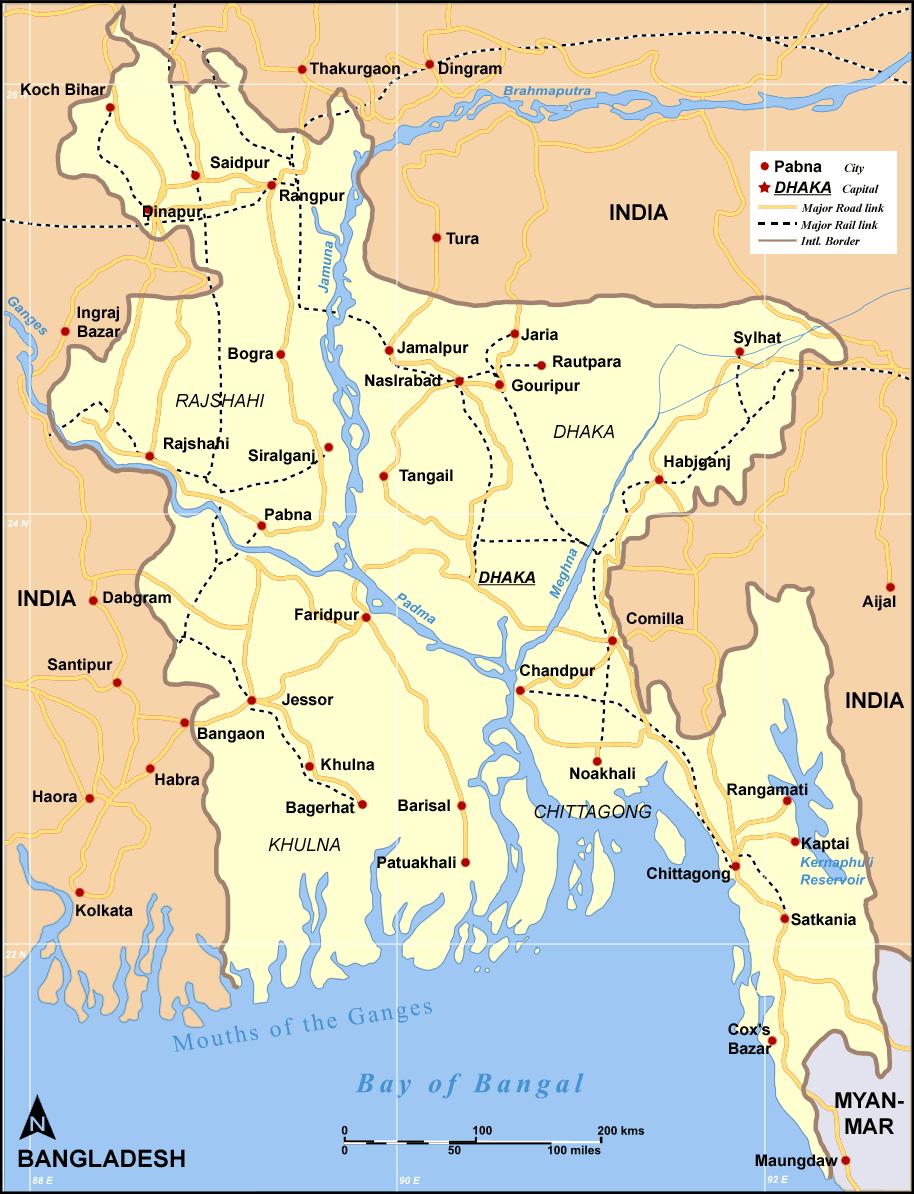
Map of Bangladesh with existing rail and road links.

Transport between India and Bangladesh bears much historical and political significance for both countries, which possessed no ground transport links for 43 years, starting with the partition of Bengal and India in 1947. The Kolkata–Dhaka Bus (1999) and the Dhaka–Agartala Bus (2001) are the primary road links between the two countries; a direct Kolkata-Agartala running through Dhaka, the capital of Bangladesh is being developed by both countries. The Maitree Express (Friendship Express) was launched to revive a railway link between Kolkata and Dhaka that had been shut for 43 years.

== Background ==
=== History ===
The partition of Bengal and India on 15 August 1947 led to the establishment of the Indian state of West Bengal; East Bengal became a province of the state of Pakistan. The hostile bilateral relations between the two nations made transport links very limited, despite the cultural and commercial links between West and East Bengal. At the outbreak of the Indo-Pakistani War of 1965, the only railway link between Dhaka and Kolkata was shut down, and not resumed until 2008 with the launch of the Maitree Express.

After the establishment of Bangladesh following the Bangladesh liberation war in 1971, bilateral relations improved considerably, but the two governments moved slowly on implementing a 1980 agreement on improving transport links. In the 1990s, the Indian and Bangladeshi governments collaborated to open bus services between Kolkata, the capital of West Bengal and one of the largest cities in India, and Dhaka, the capital and largest city of Bangladesh. In 2001, another bus service was launched to connect Dhaka with Agartala, the capital of the Indian state of Tripura the second largest city of Northeast India that borders Bangladesh in the east.

=== India-Bangladesh borders ===
Both share physical land as well as maritime borders:

- Bangladesh-India border
  - India–Bangladesh border haats
- India-Bangladesh maritime border and EEZ

=== International transport connection frameworks ===
India's Look-East connectivity policy has resulted in the launch of several connectivity projects with neighbouring countries to the east, including Bangladesh, Myanmar and ASEAN nations.

India-Bangladesh transport and other strategic inter-linkages, such as energy and internet, etc are driven by both the bilateral agreements as well as the following international cooperation frameworks many of which are facilitated by the United Nations Economic and Social Commission for Asia and the Pacific (UNESCAP)'s Sustainable Development Goals (SDGs):

Regional Connectivity Frameworks
Framework	Countries	Explanation
BBIN MVA	Bangladesh, Bhutan, India, Nepal	Motor Vehicle Agreement for regional connectivity
BCIM Economic Corridor	Bangladesh, China, India, Myanmar	Economic corridor initiative
BIMSTEC Connectivity Projects	Bangladesh, Bhutan, India, Myanmar, Nepal, Sri Lanka, Thailand	Regional cooperation projects
SAARC Route	Afghanistan, Bangladesh, Bhutan, India, Maldives, Nepal, Pakistan, Sri Lanka	South Asian regional connectivity framework
SASEC Corridors	Bangladesh, Bhutan, India, Maldives, Myanmar, Nepal, Sri Lanka	Subregional economic cooperation program
Silk Route	(China's initiative with multiple partner countries)	Part of China's Belt and Road Initiative
Trans-Asian Railway (TAR) Network	(Pan-Asian network including Bangladesh and India)	On 5 May 2007, Bangladesh announced it would join the agreement. Includes three lines between India and Myanmar through Bangladesh. India announced participation on 17 May 2007 with projects worth ₹29.41 billion (US$730 million). Bangladesh signed on 10 November 2007.

== Aerial services ==
=== Cities connected ===
Direct air connections between Bangladeshi and Indian cities (as of 2025)
Bangladeshi City	Indian City	Bangladeshi Airlines	Indian Airlines
Chittagong	Delhi	None	SpiceJet (Discontinued)
Chittagong	Kolkata	US-Bangla Airlines	None
Chittagong	Chennai	US-Bangla Airlines (Discontinued)	None
Dhaka	Chennai	Biman Bangladesh Airlines, US-Bangla Airlines	IndiGo
Dhaka	Delhi	Biman Bangladesh Airlines	Air India, IndiGo
Dhaka	Guwahati	None	SpiceJet (Discontinued)
Dhaka	Kolkata	Biman Bangladesh Airlines, Novoair, US-Bangla Airlines	Air India Express, IndiGo
Dhaka	Mumbai	None	Air India, IndiGo
Dhaka	Hyderabad	None	Indigo

=== Airlines between India-Bangladesh ===
Airlines operating between Bangladesh and India (2025)
Airline	Country	Route(s)	Notes
Biman Bangladesh Airlines	Bangladesh	Dhaka–Kolkata, Dhaka–Delhi	Bangladesh's national carrier; resumed Dhaka–Delhi flights in 2019 after 6-year gap
US-Bangla Airlines	Bangladesh	Dhaka–Kolkata, Chittagong–Kolkata	First Bangladeshi airline to operate flights to South India
Novoair	Bangladesh	Dhaka–Kolkata	Private Bangladeshi airline
Air India	India	Delhi–Dhaka, Mumbai–Dhaka	India's flag carrier
IndiGo	India	Chennai–Dhaka, Delhi–Dhaka, Mumbai–Dhaka, Kolkata–Dhaka, Hyderabad–Dhaka	
SpiceJet	India	Kolkata–Dhaka, Kolkata–Chittagong (all routes discontinued)	Briefly operated Guwahati–Dhaka route in 2019 before discontinuing

== Railway ==
The complete rail links, including the historical links, between India and Bangladesh and their current status is as follows:

=== Rail service by crossing points ===
Crossing Point (India)	Crossing Point (Bangladesh)	Status	Current train services	Historical train services	Ref
Gede, West Bengal	Darshana	Active (freight only)	Maitree Express and freight trains	East Bengal Express, East Bengal Mail	
Petrapole, West Bengal	Benapole	Active (freight only)	Bandhan Express and freight trains	Barisal Express	
Haldibari, West Bengal	Chilahati	Active (freight only)	Mitali Express		
Singhabad, West Bengal	Rohanpur	Active	Freight trains only		
Radhikapur, West Bengal	Biral	Active	Freight trains only		
Changrabandha, West Bengal	Burimari	Inactive			
Mahisasan, Assam	Shahabaz Pur	Being restored			
Agartala, Tripura	Akhaura	Active			
Belonia, Tripura	Feni	Under construction			

=== Rail service by frontiers ===
The Bangladesh border is conceptualised as consisting of two frontiers, east and west, separated by Brahmaputra River (the lower end of which is also called the Padma River) flowing north to south through the centre of Bangladesh, dividing the nation into two vertical halves.

Indian crossing	Bangladeshi crossing	Frontier (Note: Based on the Bangladeshi frontier)	Status	Current train services	Historical train services
Gede	Darshana	Western	Current	Maitree Express and freight trains	East Bengal Express, East Bengal Mail
Petrapole	Benapole	Western	Current	Bandhan Express and freight trains	Barisal Express
Singhabad	Rohonpur	Western	Current	Freight	
Radhikapur	Biral	Western	Current	Freight	
Haldibari	Chilahati	Western	Current	Mitali Express	
Changrabandha	Burimari	Western	Inactive (Note: Currently inactive but slated for restoration.)		
Mahishasan	Shahbazpur	Eastern	Being restored (Note: A meter gauge line existed but was discontinued. Slated to be restored.)		
Agartala	Akhaura	Eastern	Being restored (Note: A new line being is developed by IRCON, cost to be borne by India. Land acquisition for the ongoing Agartala-Akhaura new railway connectivity project was complete in both countries in October 2017 and laying of tracks will be completed in 2018.)		

=== Details of rail services ===
Train Name	Year Started	Route	Distance	Frequency	Notes
Maitree Express	2008	Kolkata – Dhaka Cantonment	393 km	5 days a week	First passenger rail service between India and Bangladesh after 43 years
Bandhan Express	2017	Kolkata – Khulna via Petrapole–Benapole border	172 km	Bi-weekly	Recreates route of defunct Barisal Express; added Jessore Junction stop in 2019
Mitali Express	2021	New Jalpaiguri railway station – Dhaka Cantonment railway station via Haldibari–Chilahati border	511 km	Bi-weekly	Launched during Bangladesh's independence golden jubilee celebrations

=== Proposed new rail connections ===
On 28 October 2017, Bangladesh Railway Minister Mujibal Haque said that India and Bangladesh are working on reconnecting railway lines in 12 places, which were cut off after partition of the country in 1947. India sponsored rail bridges on Titas and the Bhoirab rivers in Brahmanbaria district of Bangladesh were completed.

== Roads ==
=== Road corridors ===
Since the 1980s, the Indian and Bangladeshi governments have sought to negotiate an agreement permitting commercial vehicles to pass through Bangladeshi highways to reach the northeastern states of India from the west; a concept described in India as the "Bangla Corridor." Such an arrangement is being promoted for its benefit to bilateral commerce, the transport cost reduction for Indian businesses and additional revenue for Bangladesh. In 2006, both governments began working on a proposal to provide a bus service directly connecting Kolkata with Agartala, the capital of the Indian state of Tripura, which borders eastern Bangladesh. As of 2007, travelling distance through Indian territory is an estimated 1,700 km (1,056 mi), but a direct road link via Dhaka would shorten the travelling distance to an estimated 400 km (249 mi), considerably reducing the costs of transport for Indian businesses, which have to transport goods and services through the narrow "Chicken's Neck" territory that is bordered by northern Bangladesh and southern Nepal. However, such an arrangement has been politically sensitive in Bangladesh.

==== Existing corridors ====
Kolkata-Dhaka-Agartala route: On 2 June 2015, the first trial run of a direct bus between Kolkata and Agartala ran, a route distance of 500 km, as compared to the 1650 km if it ran through the Chicken's Neck to remain within India. This bus made an overnight stop in Dhaka. General service began on 7 June, and the first bus was flagged off by political leaders including Prime Minister of India Narendra Modi, Prime Minister of Bangladesh Sheikh Hasina, and Chief Minister of West Bengal Mamata Bannerjee.

==== Proposed new road corridors ====
Proposed India-Bangladesh cross-border transport corridors
Scope	Project	Route	Status	Purpose	Reference
East-to-West	Delhi–Dhaka–Yangon Trilateral Highway	Delhi → Kolkata → Dhaka → Myanmar	Conceptualized under BIMSTEC	Pan-regional connectivity	
West Frontier	Bhanga–Kolkata Expressway (via Padma Bridge)	Dhaka → Bhanga → Jashore → Beanpole → Petrapole → Kolkata	Under discussion (2023)	Reduce Dhaka-Kolkata travel to 6–7 hours	
West Frontier	Hili-Dinajpur Economic Corridor	Hili → Dinajpur → Bogura → Dhaka	Proposed under BBIN MVA	Connect NW Bangladesh with West Bengal	
East Frontier	Silchar-Sylhet Highway	Silchar → Sutarkandi → Sheola → Sylhet	Approved (2022)	Northeast India to Chittagong Port	
East Frontier	Agartala-Chittagong Corridor	Agartala → Akhaura → Chittagong Port	MoU signed (2023)	Northeast connectivity to Chittagong	

=== Bus service ===
==== Existing bus services ====
Route	Frequency	Travel Time	Route Details	Operators	References
Dhaka→Kolkata (West Bengal)	Daily	~12 hours	Dhaka→Benapole (Bangladesh)→Petrapole (India)→Kolkata	West Bengal Transport Corporation (WBTC) and Bangladesh Road Transport Corporation (BRTC)	
Dhaka–Agartala (Tripura)	Daily	~3 hours	Dhaka → Akhaura (Bangladesh) → Agartala (India)	BRTC & Tripura Road Transport Corporation	
Kolkata–Dhaka–Guwahati (Assam)	Operational (limited trips)	~?? hours	Kolkata → Dhaka → Sylhet → Dawki (India) → Guwahati	WBTC & BRTC	
Siliguri (West Bengal)–Dhaka	Operational (limited trips)	~?? hours	Siliguri → Fulbari (India) → Banglabandha (Bangladesh) → Dhaka	Private carriers (e.g., Shyamoli Transport)	

==== Proposed Bus Services ====
Route	Proposed Route Details	Status/Comments	References
Kolkata–Chittagong	Kolkata → Petrapole → Dhaka → Chittagong	Boost trade/tourism to Bangladesh's port city	
Shillong (Meghalaya)–Sylhet	Shillong → Dawki → Tamabil (Bangladesh) → Sylhet	Under discussion (2023)	
Delhi–Dhaka (via Varanasi)	Delhi → Varanasi → Kolkata → Dhaka	Long-distance; may combine rail/bus	

==== Details of select bus services ====
Route	Launch Date	Operators	Frequency & Timings	Distance	Duration	Notes
Kolkata–Dhaka	19 June 1999	WBSTC & BRTC (also by private AC buses, e.g. Shohagh, Green Line, etc.)	From Dhaka: Mon, Wed, Fri at 7:00 am & 7:30 am; From Kolkata: Tue, Thu, Sat at 5:30 am, 8:30 am & 12:30 pm; No service on Sunday	India: 80 km; Bangladesh: 300 km	~12.5 hrs	Facilitates family visits & commerce; Continued despite geopolitical tensions; Inaugurated by Sheikh Hasina
Dhaka–Agartala	11 July 2001	BRTC & Indian counterpart	Not specified	Not specified	Not specified	Connects Bangladesh with Indian state of Tripura.

== Shipping ==
Bangladesh and India signed agreement to use 2 ports in Bangladesh - Mongla Port and Chittagong Port to be used for the following 4 transit routes to Northeast India:

Port	Routes	Comments
Chittagong Port	Chittagong Port-Akhaura-Agartala	
Chittagong Port	Chittagong-Bibirbazar-Srimantapur	
Mongla Port	Mongla Port-Akhaura-Agartala	
Mongla Port	Mongla Port-Bibirbazar-Srimantapur	

== Other connections ==
=== Energy ===
See India-Bangladesh's existing and proposed electricity grid (see also Adani Power supply to Bangladesh), Bangladesh-India Friendship pipeline (BIFP, 130 km long diesel supply to Bangladesh), proposed Myanmar-Bangladesh-India LNG pipeline (to supply LNG from Myanmar to Bangladesh and Tripura in India), and internet connectivity.

=== Internet ===
In 2025, while Bangladesh provides internet connectivity to Northeast India, a proposal for India to directly route internet cables through Bangladesh to Northeast Asia was declined. Bangladesh opted to maintain authority over the traffic traversing its territory via its own monitoring agencies, leading India to explore alternative solutions for its connectivity needs.

== See also ==
- Bangladesh–India relations
- India-Bangladesh border ceremonies
- Greater India
- Indian Century
