= Maitree Express =

Train service in India and Bangladesh

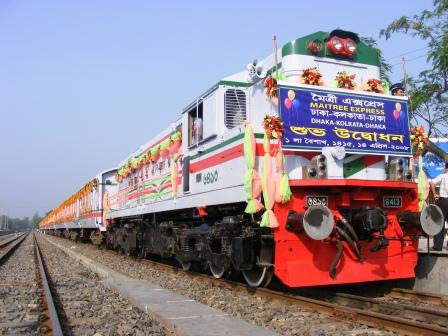
- Inauguration of Maitree Express train of the Bangladesh Railway on 14 April 2008

Overview
- Service type: AC Express
- First service: 14 April 2008; 18 years ago
- Last service: 19 July 2024; 21 months ago
- Current operators: Eastern (West Bengal) Railway zone of Indian Railways & Bangladesh Railway

Route
- Termini: Kolkata (KOAA); Dhaka Cantonment (DHCA)
- Stops: 3
- Distance travelled: 400 kilometres (250 mi)
- Average journey time: 8 hours 50 minutes
- Service frequency: 5 days
- Train number: 13107/13108/13109/13110

On-board services
- Classes: 1st AC (1A); AC Chair Car (CC)
- Seating arrangements: Yes
- Sleeping arrangements: Yes
- Catering facilities: Yes
- Entertainment facilities: No

Technical
- Rolling stock: 2 LHB rakes. 1 rake each of Indian & 1 Bangladeshi type
- Track gauge: broad gauge(1,676 mm (5 ft 6 in))
- Operating speed: 45 kilometres per hour (28 mph)

The Maitree Express (13109/13110) train (Bengali: মৈত্রী এক্সপ্রেস), often pronounced Moitree Express, was the first express train service connecting Dhaka in Bangladesh to Kolkata in the Indian state of West Bengal. The Bengali name Maitree Express means Friendship Express when translated to English, denoting the significance of the train service to the friendly foreign relations between India and Bangladesh. Previously train services between the two countries existed before the partition of India by the British and the Maitree Express re-established this connection between Dhaka and Kolkata in 2008 after being closed for 43 years. In 2017, a second train service, the Bandhan Express, was inaugurated connecting Kolkata with the Bangladeshi city of Khulna, recreating the previous Barisal Express train route. A valid visa and passport is required beforehand to purchase a ticket for the Maitree Express train. Tickets are available at Dhaka Cantonment railway station in Bangladesh and at Chitpur Station in Kolkata, India. Together with the Bandhan Express train and the Mitali Express train, the Maitree Express train is one of three modern day fully air conditioned passenger train links between India and Bangladesh.

Maitri Express Crossing time Poradah Junction

The commercial run of this train was suspended in the wake of the global COVID-19 pandemic since March 2020. However, the train resumed its service again from 29 May 2022. Since 19 July 2024, the service was suspended indefinitely due to political unrest in Bangladesh.

== Background ==
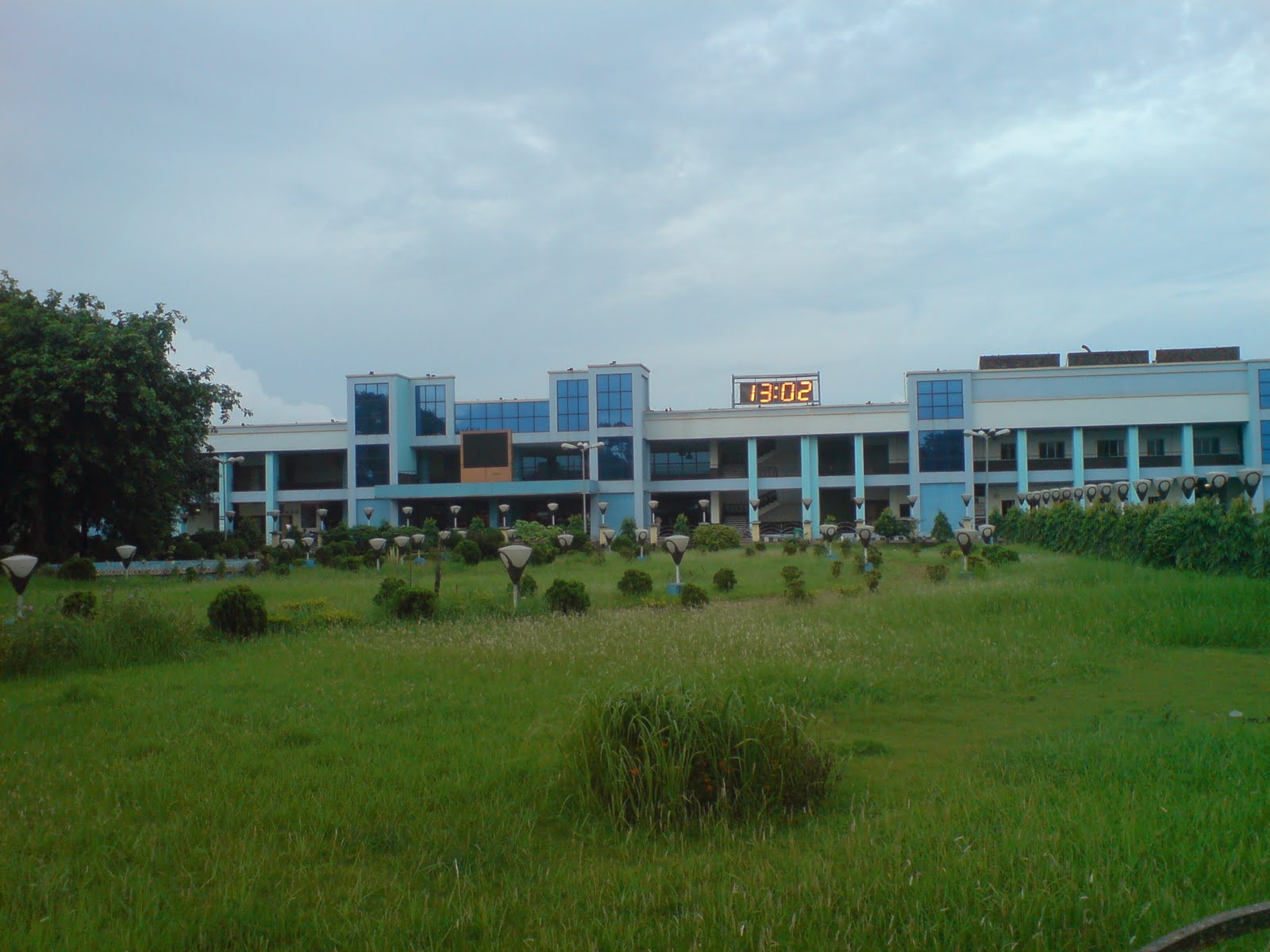
Kolkata railway station, India

The Partition of India in 1947 disrupted rail links in the province of Bengal, which was divided into the Indian state of West Bengal and the Pakistani province of East Bengal (later renamed East Pakistan in 1956). During British rule over the undivided land, regular over-night trains connected Kolkata, Goalanda, Dhaka and Narayanganj. In addition pre-partition, Darjeeling Mail connecting Kolkata (Sealdah Station) with Siliguri ran through what became East Pakistan via Gede–Darshana and Chilahati–Haldibari. Three train services from Sealdah—East Bengal Mail to Parbatipur Junction via Gede-Darshana, East Bengal Express to Goalundo Ghat via Gede-Darshana, and the Barisal Express to Khulna via Benapole–Petrapole—continued operation between the two countries until 1965, when the outbreak of the Indo-Pakistani Conflict of 1965 led to the closure of all passenger train links. The Bangladesh Liberation War resulted in the independence of East Pakistan as the nation-state of Bangladesh. The Maitree Express follows the same route as the first two trains above via Gede-Darshana.

=== Revival ===
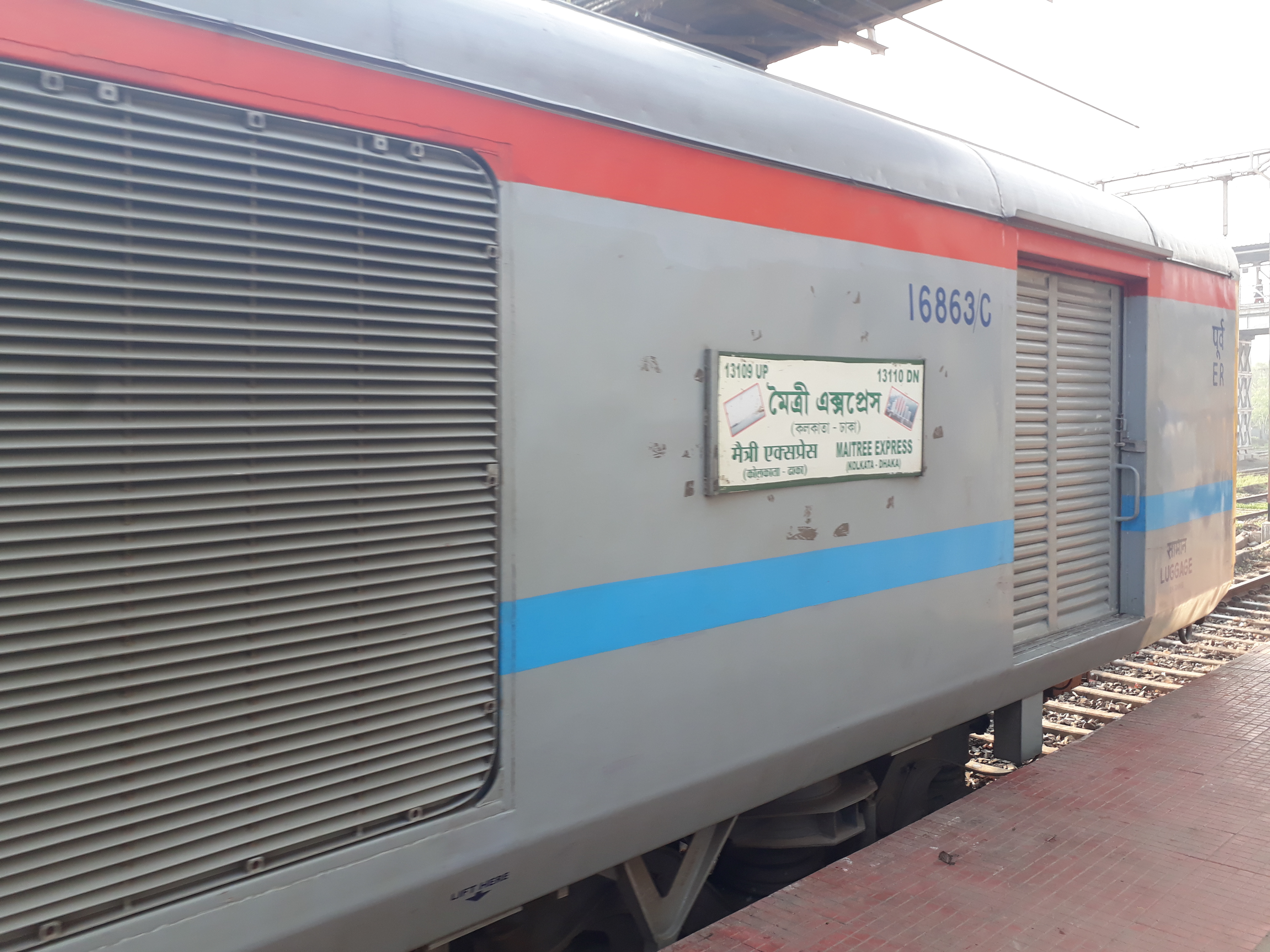
The Maitri Express

In 2001, the two national governments agreed upon the railway train scheme during bilateral talks. The train service concept got a major boost during the visit of the then Indian Foreign Minister, Pranab Mukherjee, to Dhaka in February 2007. On 8 July 2007, the first train ran from Kolkata to Dhaka in a test run, carrying Indian government officials who were to meet their Bangladeshi counterparts to finalise train schedules. In response to Indian security demands, a "box-fencing" system was to be erected on either side on the no-man's land between the two countries. The inauguration of the train service was held on the occasion of the Bengali New Year (Bengali: পহেলা বৈশাখ) 14 April 2008.

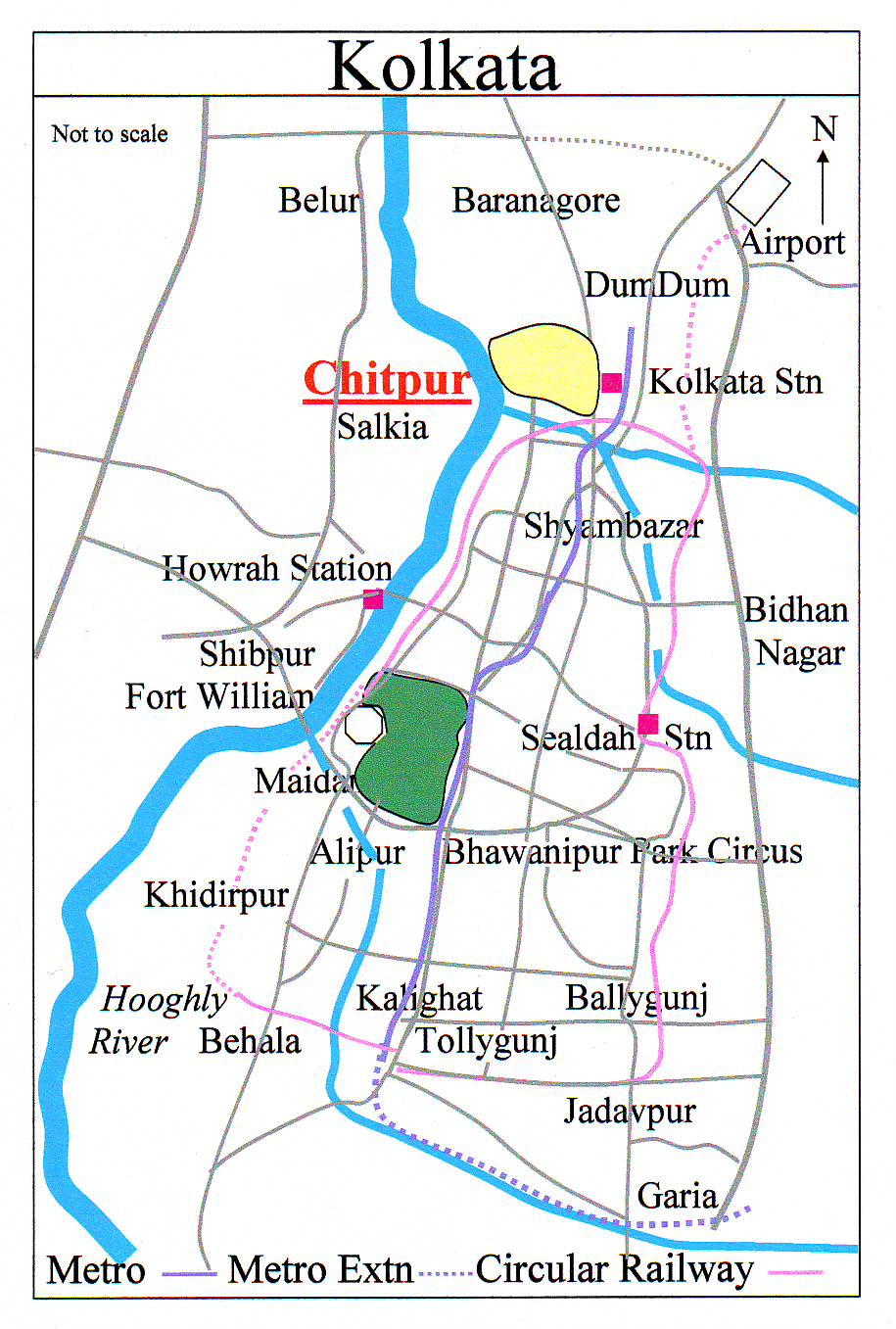
Kolkata Station, where the train departs.

== Inauguration ==
On 14 April 2008, on the occasion of the Bengali New Year, the train service was launched with much fanfare. The flag-off ceremony for the first train leaving Kolkata from the Kolkata railway station in Chitpur was attended by dignitaries such as the Indian Railway Minister Lalu Prasad Yadav; Information and Broadcasting Minister Priya Ranjan Dasmunsi; the Governor of West Bengal Gopalkrishna Gandhi; and the Bangladesh High Commissioner to India Liquat Ali Chowdhury. The Indian Foreign Minister Pranab Mukherjee officially flagged-off the inaugural train from Kolkata, bound for Dhaka. Another train departed at the same time carrying passengers from Dhaka to Kolkata. But the 360-seater Calcutta to Dhaka express train was carrying barely 65 passengers, including journalists and politicians, on its inaugural run. Indian Railways officials stated that the train service was launched hurriedly, and that when information would spread there would be a greater response and passenger numbers. An official statement from the Indian Ministry of External Affairs said, "The agreement will strengthen bilateral relations and provide an alternative mode of passenger transport."

=== Public perception ===
The inauguration of the train service evoked mixed public responses in both countries. Thousands of people gathered along the train route from Kolkata up to the border crossing point in Gede to cheer the inaugural train. However, a group representing Hindu refugees from Bangladesh, the Nikhil Banga Nagarik Sangha (All Bengal Citizens Committee) protested the launching of the train service, citing persecution of Hindus in Bangladesh; possible terrorist infiltration into India; and demanding the rehabilitation of Bangladeshi Hindu refugees. Police reports stated that 87 people (including 11 women) had been arrested for blocking the train by squatting on the tracks and refusing to move. Police blamed the group for planting three crude bombs on the route, which were defused a day before the launch on 13 April 2008. After this initial incident, this train service has been incident free so far.

== Maitree Express route and operations ==
The Maitree Express runs five days a week. The train travels around 400 kilometres (250 mi) to reach Dhaka from Kolkata. Earlier there were two stops for immigration checks in Kolkata and Dhaka. One in Gede on the Indian side and the other in Dorshona on the Bangladeshi side. Since November 2017 immigration and customs are completed at Dhaka and Kolkata. This has reduced travel time by two and half hours.

It takes around 8 hours 50 minutes to cover the entire stretch. The entire stretch is covered by broad-gauge diesel locomotives. A change of crew and locomotives takes place at Dorshona in Bangladesh. There are two major river crossings, the 100 year old Hardinge Bridge over the Padma River and the Bangabandhu Bridge over the Jamuna River. Both river crossings occur in Bangladesh. Since Pahela Boishakh 2017 (Bengali: পহেলা বৈশাখ), 14 April 2017, all coaches have been changed to air conditioned LHB coach thus enhancing the travel experience. From February 2020 the service was made five days a week, instead of four days a week till then, with additional run with BR Rake every Tuesday and Wednesday from Dhaka and Kolkata respectively.

=== Train schedule ===
Regular train departures are as follows:

Route	Day	Train No.	Rake
Dhaka to Kolkata	Friday	13107	BR
Dhaka to Kolkata	Saturday	13110	IR
Dhaka to Kolkata	Sunday	13107	BR
Dhaka to Kolkata	Tuesday	13107	BR
Dhaka to Kolkata	Wednesday	13110	IR

Route	Day	Train No.	Rake
Kolkata to Dhaka	Saturday	13108	BR
Kolkata to Dhaka	Monday	13108	BR
Kolkata to Dhaka	Tuesday	13109	IR
Kolkata to Dhaka	Wednesday	13108	BR
Kolkata to Dhaka	Friday	13109	IR

The train starts from Kolkata at 07:15 IST and reaches Dhaka at 16:05 BST the same day. Similarly, it starts from Dhaka at 08:15 BST and reaches Kolkata at 16:00 IST the same day. This train's route does not involve any lengthy ferry-crossing pauses or border checks. It is also less costly than the Kolkata to Dhaka air conditioned luxury bus services. Terminal points are Dhaka Cantonment and Kolkata (Chitpur) stations respectively. While Kolkata is a true terminal station, it is possible to continue by local train onwards to Dhaka's main station in Kamalapur from Dhaka Cantonment station. The nearest Metro station from Kolkata is Shyambazar – a distance of 2.0 kilometres (1.2 mi). There is a public bus terminal right outside Kolkata railway station with connectivity to various parts of the city.

=== Frequency ===
In February 2020, the train's frequency was increased to five days a week. From Kolkata it runs on Monday, Tuesday, Wednesday, Friday and Saturday while the train leaves Dhaka Cantonment on Sunday, Tuesday, Wednesday, Friday and Saturday.

== Diplomacy ==
The development of the Kolkata–Dhaka train service is akin to that of the Samjhauta Express (meaning "Understanding" or "Accord" Express), which connects the Indian capital Delhi to Lahore in Pakistan. Both train services were opened to revive rail links between the countries that were disrupted by the partition of India by the British in 1947. Both have been used as symbols of goodwill and cooperation between India and Bangladesh, in the case of the Maitree Express, and India and Pakistan in the case of the Samjhauta Express.

== Challenges ==
Earlier the Maitree Express was said to be running at 50% occupancy in 2011. With increase in runs to five days a week, this service has gained popularity. Better publicity in local media at both terminal cities also could help raise patronage leading to the train becoming a daily service. Despite this, in 2018 patronage has increased and average occupancy is around 90%.

== Booking ==
Unlike most of the Indian trains, online booking through the IRCTC website is not available for this train. Tickets are only available in local currency at the booking counters of Chitpur Station in Kolkata and a valid Bangladeshi visa in the passport is mandatory before purchasing a ticket. The valid visa and passport has to be shown when purchasing the train ticket. While applying for a visa it was earlier essential to specify the port of entry as "By rail-Gede" (for an Indian visa) or "By rail-Darshana"(for a Bangladeshi visa). Tickets will be issued only after issue of the visa. Valid passports must be shown while booking. In case all passengers are not present, an authorisation is required while booking tickets. After both countries started issuing an e-Visa, mentioning specific port and mode of transport is no longer required. Since this is a highly popular train, tickets need to be booked at least 5 or 6 days in advance. As of 18 June 2014, return tickets are available on a predefined number of seats, for up-to two weeks before the date of journey, excluding the journey date. The return tickets have to be validated by going to the station two hours before the departure of the train. The return fare includes only the base fare and all other taxes and service charges have to be paid during the validation of the ticket. This is applicable for return journeys from both Dhaka as well as Kolkata.

Tickets are available in Dhaka from the Main Reservation Counter of Kamalapur railway station. The counter at Dhaka Cantonment is open everyday from 0900 to 1900. A valid visa and passport has to be shown when purchasing the train ticket. In Kolkata tickets may be purchased from the International Ticket Booking Counter at Fairlie Place, Dalhousie Square, and also at Chitpur Station in Kolkata on the day of arrival of the train from Dhaka.

== Coach composition ==
The train consisting the number 13109/10, is operated by Indian Railways rake which are purely LHB coach in red-grey (used by Rajdhani Express trains) and sky blue-grey (used by Shatabdi Express trains).

While the train consisting the number 13107/08 is operated using Bangladesh Railway rake, which are also LHB coach in dark green livery with white horizontal line.

The train has 10 coaches. 4 AC Executive Class, 4 AC Chair Car and 2 power car brake vans. and these trains was hauled by Bardhaman-based WDM-3D or WDM-3A

Legends

LRM/GD/EOG/SLR	H-	C-
Generator cum luggage van	First AC Sleeper Coach	AC Chair Car (CC)

Indian rakes

Rake composition of 13109 Kolkata to Dhaka
Loco	1	2	3	4	5	6	7	8	9	10
	EOG	H1	H2	H3	H4	C1	C2	C3	C4	EOG

- while 13110 Dhaka to Kolkata has reverse rake composition of 13109.

Bangladeshi rake

Rake composition of 13107 Dhaka to Kolkata
Loco	1	2	3	4	5	6	7	8	9	10
	EOG	A1	A2	A3	A4	B1	B2	B3	B4	EOG

- while 13108 Kolkata to Dhaka has reverse rake composition of 13107.

== See also ==
- Bandhan Express
- Mitali Express
- Samjhauta Express
- Transport between India and Bangladesh#Rail links
