= East Bengal Mail =

Defunct train in India

Overview
- Service type: Mail train

Route
- Termini: Sealdah; Parbatipur Junction
- Service frequency: Daily

Technical
- Track gauge: 1,676 mm (5 ft 6 in)

The East Bengal Mail was one of three trains operated between India and East Pakistan (now Bangladesh). The rail link was suspended at the outbreak of the Indo-Pakistani War of 1965.

== Overview ==
Prior to 1965, when armed conflict broke out between India and Pakistan, rail links existed between India and East Pakistan. Three trains ran between the two countries carrying goods and passengers: (1) East Bengal Express between Sealdah and Goalundo Ghat via Gede–Darshana, (2) East Bengal Mail between Sealdah and Parbatipur Junction via Gede–Darshana, and (3) Barisal Express between Sealdah and Khulna via Petrapole–Benapole.

== History ==
From 1878, the railway route from Kolkata, then called Calcutta, to Siliguri was in two legs through the eastern part of Bengal. The first leg was a 185 km journey along the Eastern Bengal State Railway from Calcutta Station (later renamed Sealdah) to Damookdeah Ghat on the southern bank of the Padma River, then across the river in a ferry and the second leg of the journey. A 336 kilometres (209 mi) metre-gauge line of the North Bengal Railway linked Saraghat on the northern bank of the Padma to Siliguri.

The 1,849 metres (6,066 ft) Hardinge Bridge across the Padma opened for trains in 1915. Presently, it is between the Paksey and Bheramara stations on the broad-gauge line between Khulna and Parbatipur in Bangladesh. In 1926 the metre-gauge section north of the bridge was converted to broad gauge, and so the entire Calcutta – Siliguri route became broad-gauge. East Bengal Mail used to cover the distance of 376 kilometres (234 mi) in 7 hours 50 mins in up direction & in 8 hours in down direction, running at 47.5 kilometres per hour (29.5 mph). Train used to leave Sealdah at 21.10 hours, reaching Parbatipur at 05.00 hours. In return used to leave Parbatipur at 21.30 hours, arriving Sealdah at 05.30 hours.

In the pre-independence days, two legendary mail trains used the Sealdah–Parbatipur line. The Darjeeling Mail linked Kolkata, then known as Calcutta, and Siliguri. The Assam Mail originally ran from Sealdah to Santahar by broad gauge, and onwards by metre gauge from Santahar to Guwahati (then spelt Gauhati).

== Branch lines ==
Not only was the mainline an important one but a cursory glance at the route map shows important links. The Maitree Express uses a part of the route in Kolkata to Iswardi journey. The Mitali Express uses a part of the route from New Jalpaiguri to Iswardi journey.

Abdulpur is an important junction with links to Rajshahi and the India–Bangladesh border at Rahanpur-Singhabad. In olden days, it was the route for travel between Malda and Kolkata.

Santahar is another important junction, with a metre-gauge connection to many places in the northern part of Bangladesh.

In pre-independence days, there was a metre-gauge line: Katihar–Radhikapur–Biral–Parbatipur–Tista–Geetaldaha–Golakganj–Fakiragram.
