= Bankimnagar railway station =

Railway station in West Bengal, India

Bankimnagar
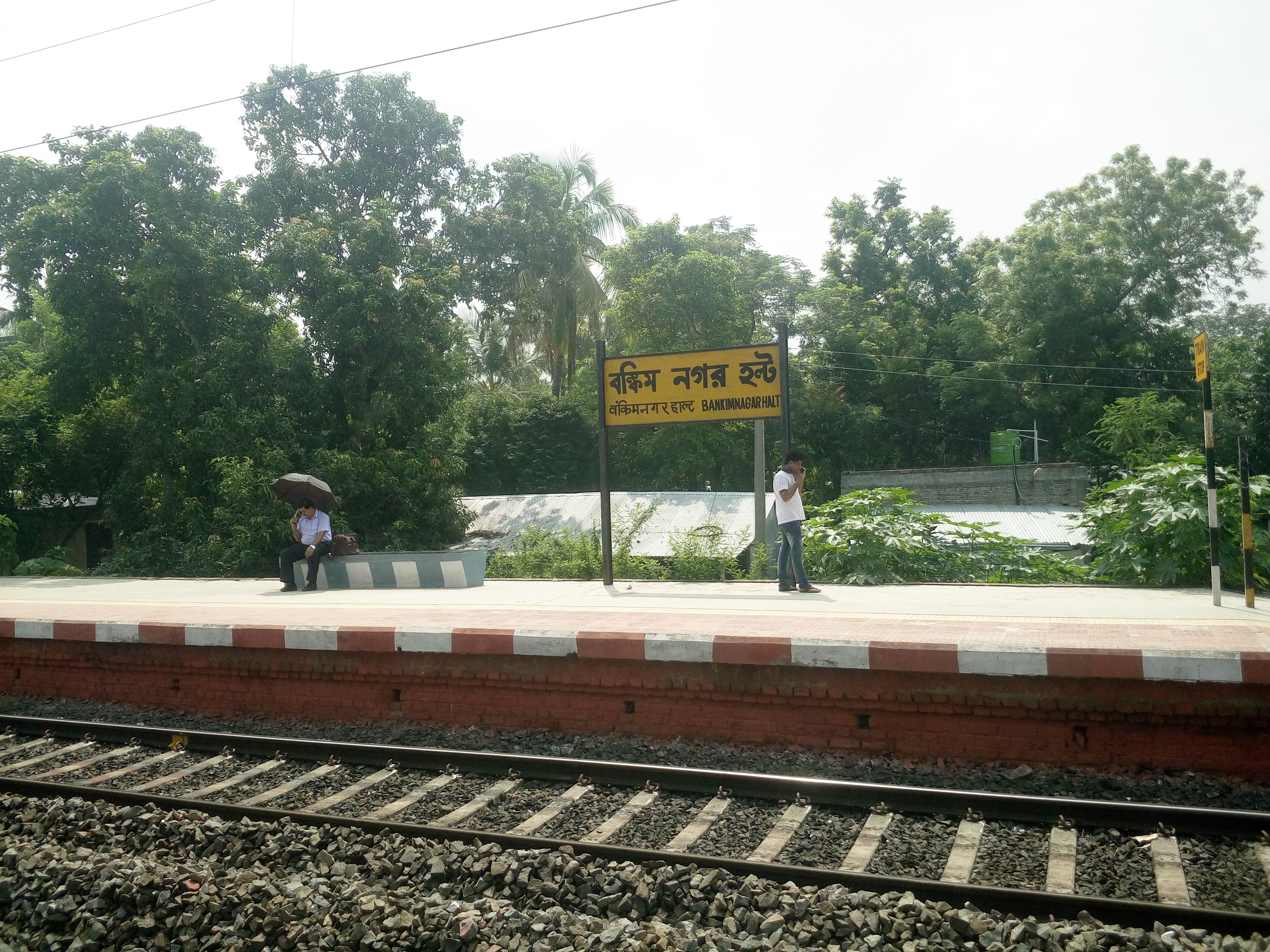

General information
- Location: Bankim Nagar, Nadia, West Bengal; India
- Coordinates: 23.208850°N 88.591599°E
- Elevation: 15 m (49 ft)
- System: Kolkata Suburban Railway
- Owner: Indian Railways
- Operator: Eastern Railway
- Line: Ranaghat–Gede line of Kolkata Suburban Railway
- Platforms: 2
- Tracks: 2

Construction
- Structure type: At grade
- Parking: Not available
- Cycle facilities: Not available
- Accessible: Not available

Other information
- Status: Functional
- Station code: BNKA
- Zone(s): Eastern Railway
- Division(s): Sealdah

History
- Opened: 1862; 164 years ago
- Electrified: 1965; 61 years ago

Services
Preceding station	Kolkata Suburban Railway	Following station
Ranaghat Junction towards Sealdah	Eastern Line Gede line	Pancheberia towards Gede
Route map
Location
- Location within West Bengal Location within India

Bankim Nagar railway station is a halt railway station of the Kolkata Suburban Railway system and operated by Eastern Railway. It is located on the Ranaghat–Gede line in Nadia in the Indian state of West Bengal.
