= Nikhil Banga Nagarik Sangha =

The Nikhil Banga Nagarik Sangha (Bengali: নিখিল বঙ্গ নাগরিক সংঘ Nikhil Bônggo Nagorik Shônggho "All Bengal Citizens Association") is a political organisation of Bangladeshi refugees in India that works to achieve the resettlement of the refugees in India and fight persecution against Hindus in Bangladesh.

The organisation gained notoriety in its attempts to disrupt the inauguration of the Maitree Express on 14 April 2008, which will provide train services between the Indian city of Kolkata and Dhaka, the capital of Bangladesh. The organisation condemned the train service and the Indian government's effort to develop close links with Bangladesh. Police blamed the group for planting three bombs on the route on Sunday. The bombs were defused and scores of the group's supporters were arrested while demonstrating near the tracks. The train was also stopped briefly by Sangha activists and protesters demanding the rehabilitation of Bangladeshi refugees.

Nikhil Banga Nagarik Sangha started on 23 November 1977, in Kolkata. Apart from this NBNS was fortunate enough to have Sri Amitabha Ghosh (retired Accountant General of Bihar) and Sri Pramatha Ranjan Tagore (secretary general of Matua Sangha) as its framers. Leaders of the organization included Sri Subrata Chatterjee (engineer), Dr. Kalidas Baidya and Sri Birendranath Biswas (professor).

The sole aim of Nikhil Banga Nagarik Sangha, ever since its inception, has been to fortify public opinion against religious persecution followed by expulsion of Hindu, Buddhist and Christian people from Bangladesh (erstwhile East Pakistan) and establish their human rights. To gather and build up more public opinion, the organization got engaged with organizing protest marches, demonstrations, conferences across different districts of Bengal. The organization happened to be the first in the Indian state of Bengal to launch a fiery anti-Bangladeshi infiltrators struggle and left no stone unturned to expel them from the state in large numbers. The intensity of the struggle led to an unfortunate development – on 28 January 1986, two prime activists of NBNS, namely Sri Sudhanya Mallik (age 55) and Sri Prahlad Bhomik (age 35), were shot and killed by Bangladeshi Muslim infiltrators at Rasullapur under the jurisdiction of police station of Chakdaha in the district of Nadia.
