= Bandhan Express =

Train service connecting Bangladesh and West Bengal

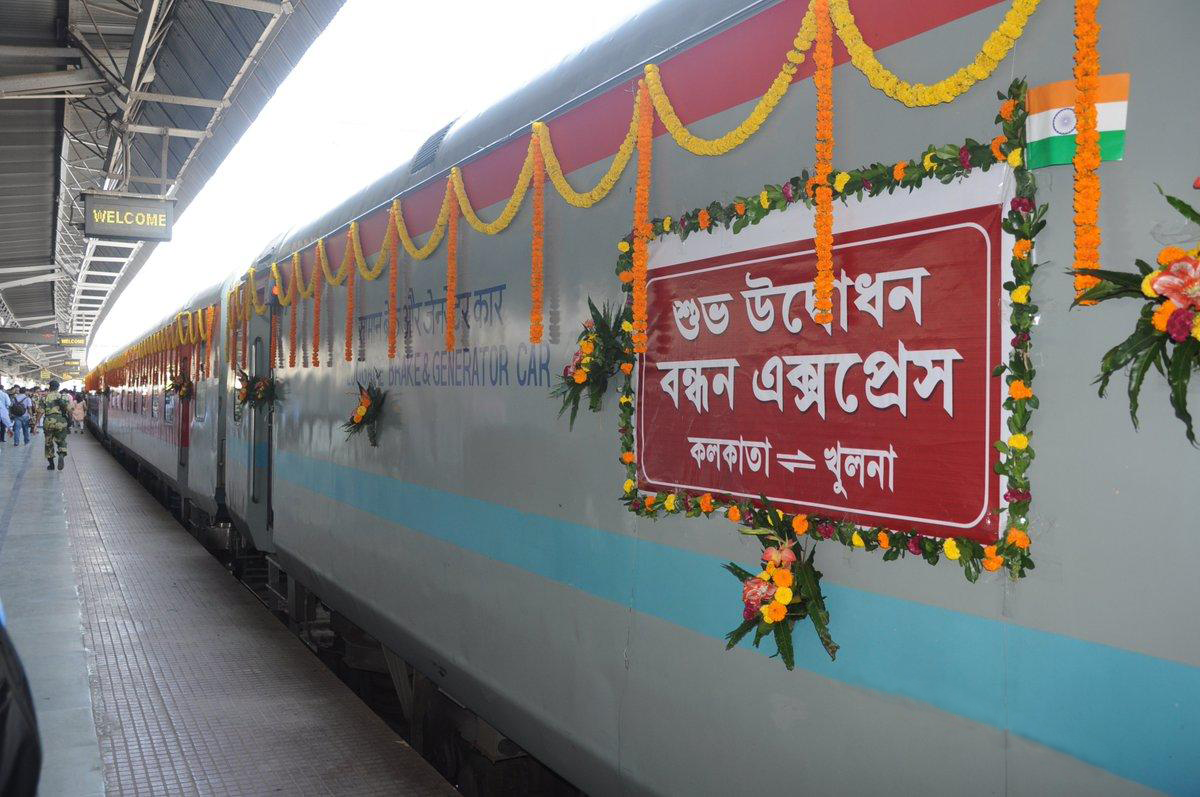

Overview
- Service type: AC Express
- First service: 9 November 2017; 9 years ago
- Last service: 18 July 2024; 2 years ago
- Current operators: West Zone of Bangladesh Railway & Eastern Railway zone of Indian Railway

Route
- Termini: Kolkata (KOAA); Khulna (KLNB)
- Stops: 3
- Distance travelled: 172 km (107 mi)
- Average journey time: 5 hours 20 mins
- Service frequency: Bi-weekly
- Train number: 13129/13130

On-board services
- Classes: AC First Class (1A); AC Chair Car (CC)
- Seating arrangements: Yes
- Sleeping arrangements: Yes
- Catering facilities: No
- Entertainment facilities: No

Technical
- Rolling stock: LHB coach
- Track gauge: 1,676 mm (5 ft 6 in)

The Bandhan Express train (Bengali: বন্ধন এক্সপ্রেস) is an international express rail service which runs between the Indian city Kolkata and the Bangladeshi city Khulna every week. It is the second modern day, fully air conditioned passenger train link between the Indian state West Bengal and Bangladesh. The Bengali word Bandhan means bonding when translated to English. It was initially referred to as the Maitree Express II. A valid visa and passport is required before purchasing a ticket for the Bandhan Express train. Tickets are available at Khulna railway station in Bangladesh and at Chitpur Station in Kolkata, India. Together with the Maitree Express train and the Mitali Express train, the Bandhan Express train is one of three modern day fully air conditioned passenger train links between India and Bangladesh.

The commercial run of this train was suspended in the wake of the global COVID-19 pandemic since March 2020. However, the train resumed its normal operations from 29 May 2022. Since 19 July 2024, the service was suspended indefinitely due to political unrest in Bangladesh.

== History ==
Prime Minister of India, Narendra Modi; Prime Minister of Bangladesh, Sheikh Hasina; and Chief Minister of West Bengal, Mamata Banerjee, flagged off the Kolkata–Khulna Bandhan Express train service via video conference from Kolkata on 9 November 2017.

=== Naming ===
After the Kolkata–Dhaka Maitree Express train was operational, it was proposed to name this second India–Bangladesh train on the Kolkata–Khulna route as 'Sonartari'. But the same name is used in the railways and trains of both countries and hence it was omitted. Then the names Sampritee and Bandhan were offered. Finally the name Bandhan meaning Bonding was unanimously accepted.

== Route ==
The route recreates the previous Barisal Express route. The train starts at Kolkata railway station on the Indian side, stopping at Dum Dum and Bangaon before reaching the Indian border at Petrapole. The train then crosses to Benapole on the Bangladeshi side, going through Jhikargachha & Jessore, before reaching Khulna railway station. There are no immigration or customs checks at the international border between India and Bangladesh for this train. The immigration process is done in Kolkata and Khulna. A valid visa and passport is required before purchasing a ticket for the Bandhan Express train. Tickets are available at Khulna Railway Station in Bangladesh and at Chitpur Station in Kolkata, India.

On 8 March 2019 both Government agreed to make a 3-minute halt at Jessore in order to attract more passengers and 200 tickets are reserved for the passengers from Jessore station.

== Timings and frequency ==
Since its inauguration, the train only ran on Thursdays but from February 2020, the frequency was increased and now it runs twice a week, Sunday and Thursday.

Kolkata to Khulna (13129)
Station	Arrival	Departure	Zone
Kolkata	–	07:10 IST	ER
Petrapole	08:55 IST	09:05 IST	ER
Benapole	09:35 BST	10:15 BST	BR
Jessore	11:30 BST	11:33 BST	BR
Khulna	12:30 BST	–	BR

Khulna to Kolkata (13130)
Station	Arrival	Departure	Zone
Khulna	–	13:30 BST	BR
Jessore	14:27 BST	14:30 BST	BR
Benapole	14:45 BST	16:00 BST	BR
Petrapole	16:10 IST	16:20 IST	ER
Kolkata	18:10 IST	–	ER

== Coach composition ==
Pure LHB coach in red-grey (used by Rajdhani Expresses) and sky blue-grey (used by Shatabdi Expresses) manufactured in India, are used for this train.

- It comprises 4 AC First Class (1A), 4 AC Chair car (CC), and 2 Generator cum luggage cum guard van, hence, a total of 10 coaches. And hauled by Bardhaman-based WDM-3D or WDM-3A

Legends

LRM/GD/EOG/SLR	H-	C-
Generator cum luggage van	AC First Class (1A)	AC Chair Car (CC)

Rake composition of 13129 down Kolkata to Khulna

Loco	1	2	3	4	5	6	7	8	9	10
	EOG	H1	H2	H3	H4	C1	C2	C3	C4	EOG

- While 13130 up Khulna to Kolkata has reverse rake composition of 13129.

== See also ==
- Maitree Express
- Mitali Express
- Samjhauta Express
- Transport between India and Bangladesh#Rail links
