= Harish Nagar Halt railway station =

Railway station in West Bengal, India

Harish Nagar Halt

General information
- Location: BSF Road, Harish Nagar, Nadia, West Bengal; India
- Coordinates: 23°28′12″N 88°46′42″E
- Elevation: 13 m (43 ft)
- System: Indian Railways station Kolkata Suburban Railway station
- Owner: Indian Railways
- Operator: Eastern Railway
- Line: Ranaghat–Gede line of Kolkata Suburban Railway
- Platforms: 2
- Tracks: 2

Construction
- Structure type: Standard (on ground station)
- Cycle facilities: Not available

Other information
- Status: Functioning
- Station code: HRSR
- Zone(s): Eastern Railway
- Division(s): Sealdah

History
- Opened: 1862
- Electrified: 1997–98
- Former names: Eastern Bengal Railway

Services
Preceding station	Kolkata Suburban Railway	Following station
Banpur towards Sealdah	Eastern Line Gede line	Gede Terminus
Route map
Location
- Location within West Bengal Location within India

Harish Nagar Halt railway station is a halt railway station of the Kolkata Suburban Railway system and operated by Eastern Railway. It is situated beside BSF Road at Harish Nagar on the Ranaghat–Gede line in Nadia district in the Indian state of West Bengal.

== History ==
The Ranaghat–Gede section was the part of the Eastern Bengal Railway which was opened in 1862 and extended to Kushtia, now in Bangladesh. This was the Calcutta–Siliguri main line but after the Partition of India in 1947, this got truncated and what remained India named the Gede Branch Line. The line including Harish Nagar Halt railway station was electrified in 1997–98.
