= Gede railway station =

Railway station in West Bengal, India

Gede

General information
- Location: Gede, Nadia, West Bengal; India
- Coordinates: 23°29′31″N 88°47′15″E
- Elevation: 15 m (49 ft)
- System: Indian Railways & Kolkata Suburban Railway station
- Owner: Indian Railways
- Operator: Eastern Railway
- Platforms: 3
- Tracks: 4

Construction
- Structure type: Standard (on-ground station)
- Parking: Available
- Cycle facilities: Not available
- Accessible: Not available

Other information
- Status: Functioning
- Station code: GEDE
- Zone(s): Eastern Railway
- Division(s): Sealdah

History
- Opened: 1862
- Electrified: 1997–98
- Former names: Eastern Bengal Railway

Services
Preceding station	Kolkata Suburban Railway	Following station
Harish Nagar Halt towards Sealdah	Eastern Line Gede line	Terminus
Route map
Location
- Location within West Bengal Location within India

Gede is the last railway station on the Indian side of the Bangladesh–India border in Krishnaganj CD Block in Nadia district in the Indian state of West Bengal. The corresponding station on the Bangladesh side is Darshana. It is the terminal station on the Sealdah–Gede section of Kolkata Suburban Railway system. There is a border checkpoint at Gede.

== History ==
Gede was one of the stations on the Sealdah–Goalundo route of East Bengal Railway. With the partition of India in 1947, it became a border town. Thereafter there were three trains from Sealdah running into East Pakistan: the East Bengal Express, the East Bengal Mail and the Barisal Express. The services all ceased after the Indo-Pakistani War of 1965. Freight trains ran on Petrapole–Benapole, Gede–Darshana and Singhabad–Rohanpur lines off and on since 1972 after the independence of Bangladesh, and more regularly after transport agreements were signed by the two countries in the 1990s.Radhikapur–Birol section was another section for movement of goods traffic. As of 2002, the Gede-Darshana section accounted for the bulk of the exports handled by the Indian Railways (both the Eastern Railway and the Northeast Frontier Railway together) for Bangladesh.

A direct train between Dhaka and Kolkata, named Maitree Express (Maitree is a Sanskrit word meaning friendship) commenced on 14 April 2008. The train is managed by Indian Railways and Bangladesh Railway. The approximate distance covered by Maitree Express is estimated at around 375 kilometres (233 mi), a stretch of 114 kilometres (71 mi) in India and a stretch of 261 kilometres (162 mi) in Bangladesh. The train follows the border point route at Gede–Darshana. The train runs on Saturdays and Sundays every week. Passengers of the Maitree Express are irked by the five-hour wait for immigration and customs clearance at the border stations of Darshana and Gede.

== Trans-Asian Railway ==
Currently, all freight traffic originating from Asia destined for Europe goes by sea. The Trans-Asian Railway will enable containers from Singapore, China, Vietnam, Cambodia, India, Bangladesh, Myanmar, Thailand and Korea to travel over land by train to Europe. The Southern Corridor of the Trans-Asian Railway is of prime interest to India. It connects Yunnan in China and Thailand with Europe via Turkey and passes through India.

The proposed route will enter India through Tamu and Moreh in Manipur bordering Myanmar, then enter Bangladesh through Mahisasan and Shabajpur and again enter India from Bangladesh at Gede. On the western side, the line will enter Pakistan at Attari. There is a 315 kilometres (196 mi) missing link on this route in the India–Myanmar sector; of this, 180 kilometres (110 mi), in India, is between Jiribam in Manipur and Tamu in Myanmar. The rail link between Jiribam and Imphal has been sanctioned by Indian Railways, but that is unlikely to be completed before 2016. At present construction work is in progress in a 97 kilometres (60 mi) stretch between Jiribam and Tupul.
