= Dhaka Cantonment railway station =

Railway station in Dhaka, Bangladesh

Dhaka Cantonment ঢাকা ক্যান্টনমেন্ট
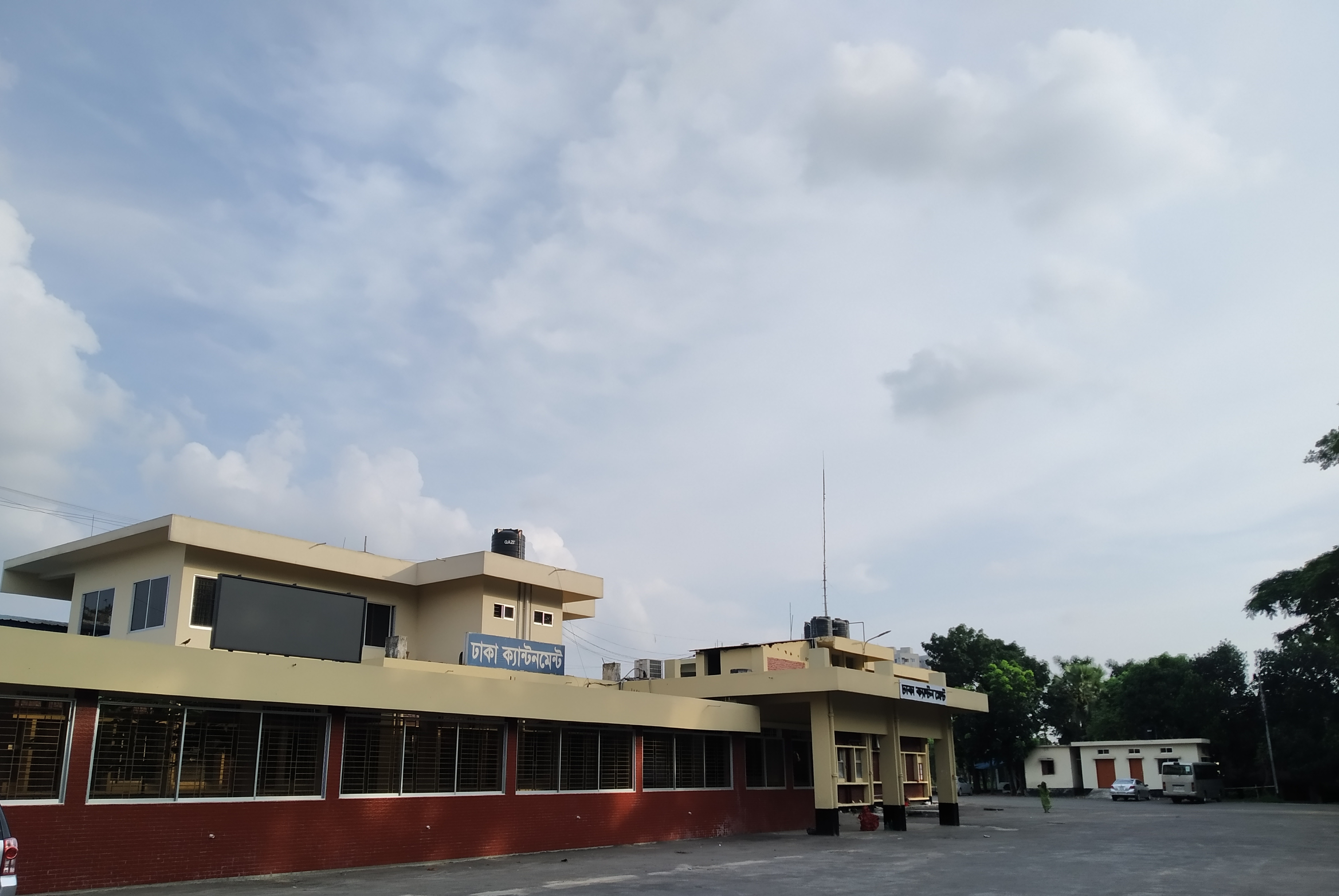

General information
- Location: Airport Road, Dhaka Cantonment, Dhaka; Bangladesh
- Coordinates: 23°48′55.8″N 90°24′38.16″E
- Elevation: 11 metres (36 ft)
- System: Passenger train station
- Owner: Bangladesh Railway
- Line: Narayanganj–Bahadurabad Ghat line
- Platforms: 1
- Tracks: Dual Gauge

Construction
- Structure type: Standard (on ground station)
- Parking: Yes
- Cycle facilities: Yes
- Accessible: Disabled access Computerized Ticketing Counters Luggage Checking System Food Plaza Kiosks WC Taxi Stand Public Transportation

Other information
- Status: Functioning
- Station code: DHCA
- Zone(s): East Zone
- Division(s): Dhaka
- Classification: International / Domestic

History
- Opened: 1981

Services
Preceding station	Bangladesh Railway	Following station
Banani towards Narayanganj	Narayanganj–Bahadurabad Ghat	Dhaka Airport towards Bahadurabad Ghat
Location

Dhaka Cantonment railway station is a railway station located in Dhaka, Bangladesh. It is notable as one of the termini of the Bangladesh-India Maitree Express & Mitali Express international passenger train service.

The station is located in its namesake Dhaka Cantonment, Cantonment Thana, in the north of Dhaka. The station is near the Shahjalal International Airport (however the airport has its own station).

== Services ==
- Maitree Express
- Mitali Express
