= Ranaghat Junction railway station =

Railway Station in West Bengal, India

Ranaghat Junction
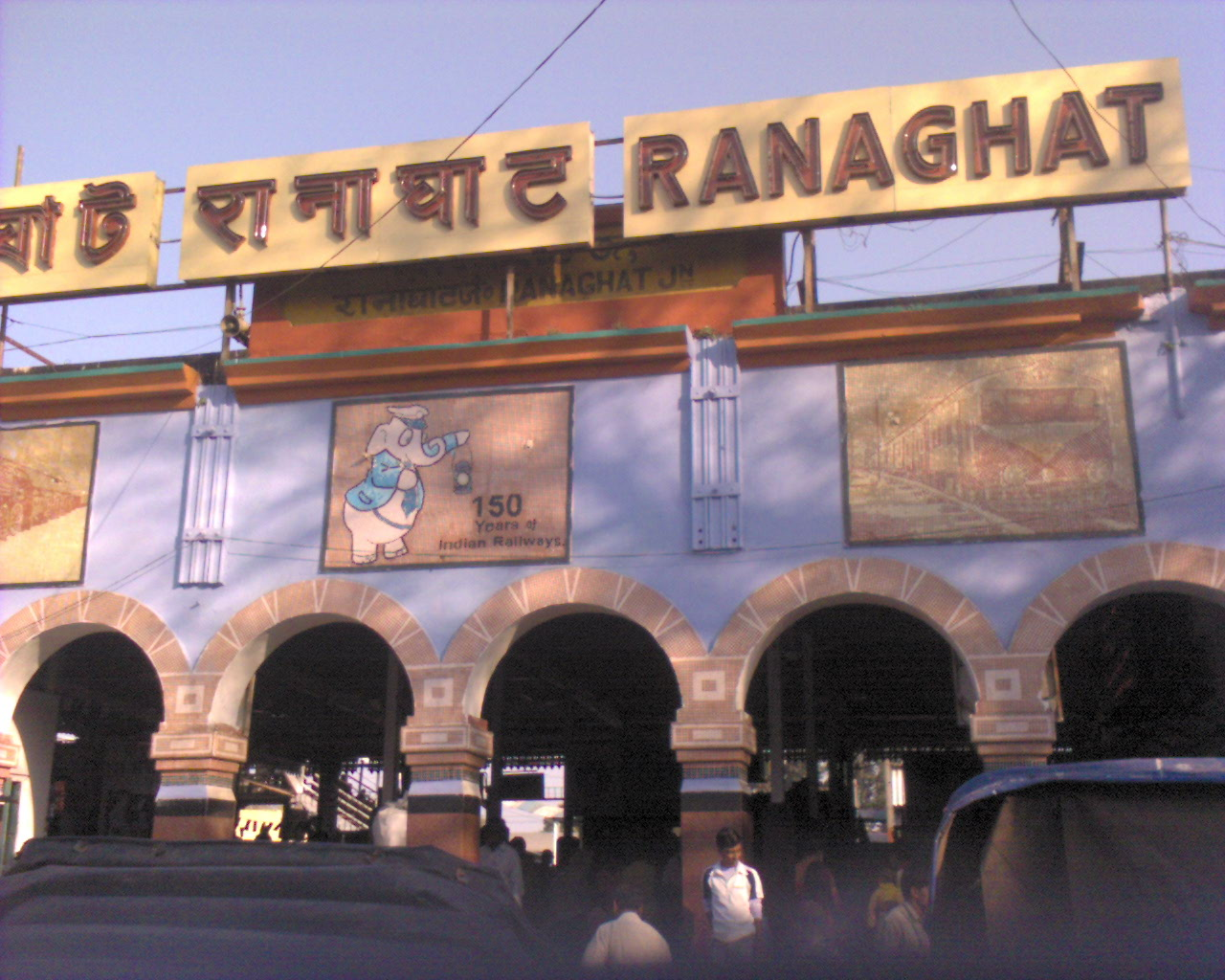
- Ranaghat Junction railway station

General information
- Location: GNPC Road, Ranaghat, Nadia, West Bengal; India
- Coordinates: 23°10′27″N 88°34′07″E
- Elevation: 13 metres (43 ft)
- System: Kolkata Suburban Railway junction station
- Owner: Indian Railways
- Operator: Eastern Railway
- Lines: Sealdah–Lalgola line Ranaghat–Gede line Bangaon–Ranaghat line of Kolkata Suburban Railway
- Platforms: 6
- Tracks: 10

Construction
- Structure type: At grade
- Parking: Not available
- Cycle facilities: Not available
- Accessible: Not available

Other information
- Status: Functioning
- Station code: RHA
- Zone(s): Eastern Railway
- Division(s): Sealdah

History
- Opened: 1862; 164 years ago
- Electrified: 1963–1965; 61 years ago
- Former names: Eastern Bengal Railway

Services
Preceding station	Kolkata Suburban Railway	Following station
Payradanga towards Sealdah	Eastern Line Ranaghat–Krishnanagar City–Lalgola line	Kalinarayanpur Junction towards Lalgola
Payradanga towards Sealdah	Eastern Line Main line/Gede line	Bankimnagar towards Gede
Terminus	Eastern Line Ranaghat–Bangaon line	Coopers Halt towards Bangaon Junction
Route map
Location
- Location within West Bengal Location within India

Ranaghat is a Kolkata Suburban Railway junction station on the Sealdah–Ranaghat line, the Lalgola branch line, the Gede branch line and the Ranaghat–Bangaon link line. It is located in Nadia district in the Indian state of West Bengal. It serves Ranaghat and the surrounding areas.

== History ==
The Calcutta (Sealdah)–Kusthia line of Eastern Bengal Railway was opened to traffic in 1862. Eastern Bengal Railway worked on the eastern side of the Hooghly River, which in those days was unbridged.

The Ranaghat–Bangaon link was constructed in 1882–84 by the Bengal Central Railway Company

The Ranaghat–Lalgola branch line was opened in 1905.

== Electrification ==
The Sealdah–Ranaghat sector was electrified in 1963–64. The Ranaghat–Shantipur sector was electrified in 1963–64. The Kalinarayanpur-Krishnanagar City sector was electrified in 1964–65. The Ranaghat–Gede line was electrified in 1999–2000.The Ranaghat–Lalgola section has been electrified on the 2010s.

== Carriage and wagon depot ==
It can handle the turn around maintenance of three trains.

== Gallery ==
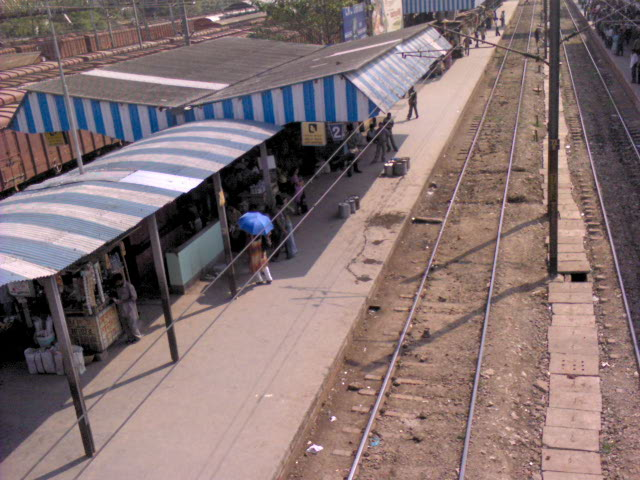
Birds eye-view, Ranaghat Station

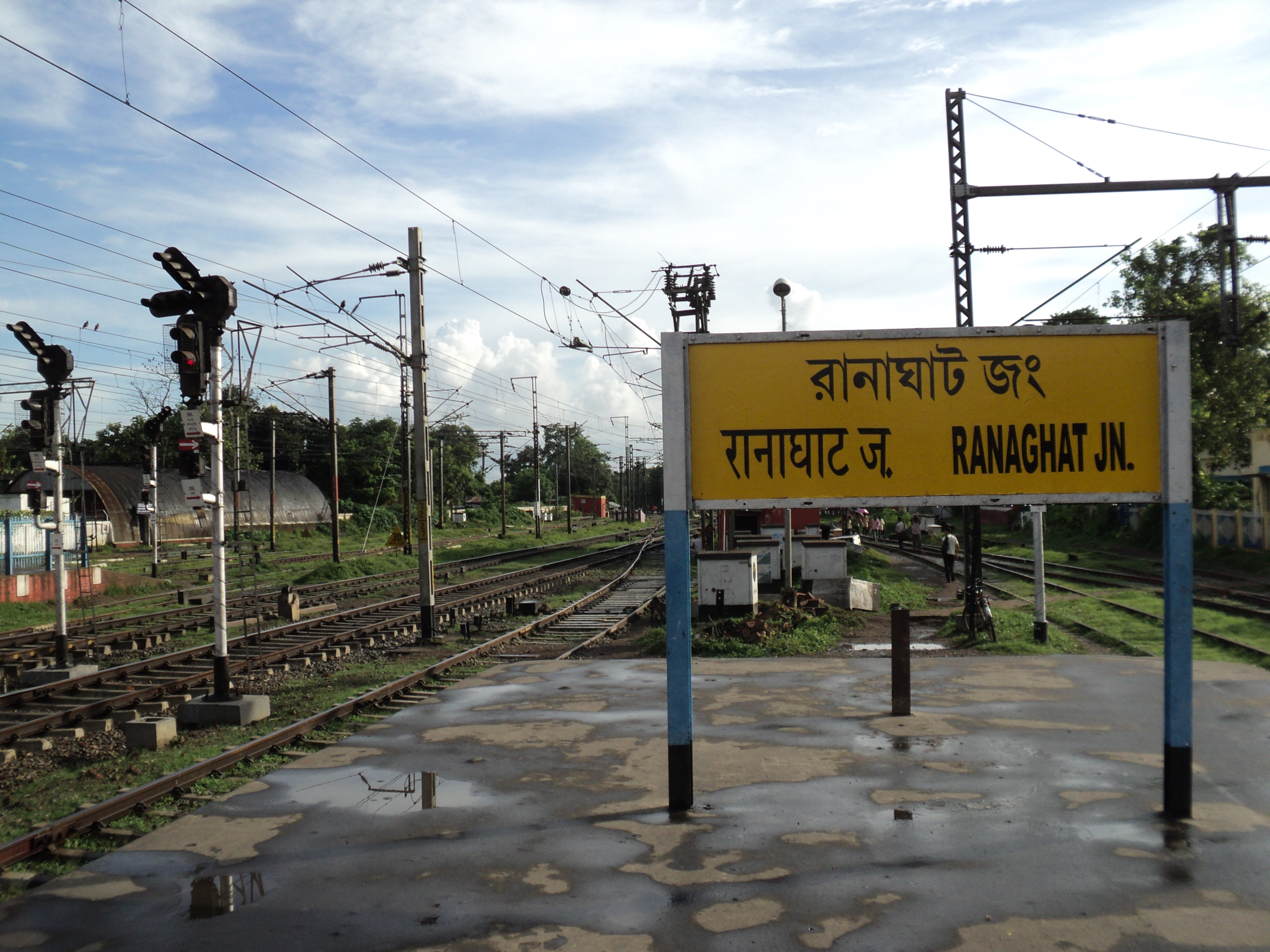
The name board at Ranaghat station

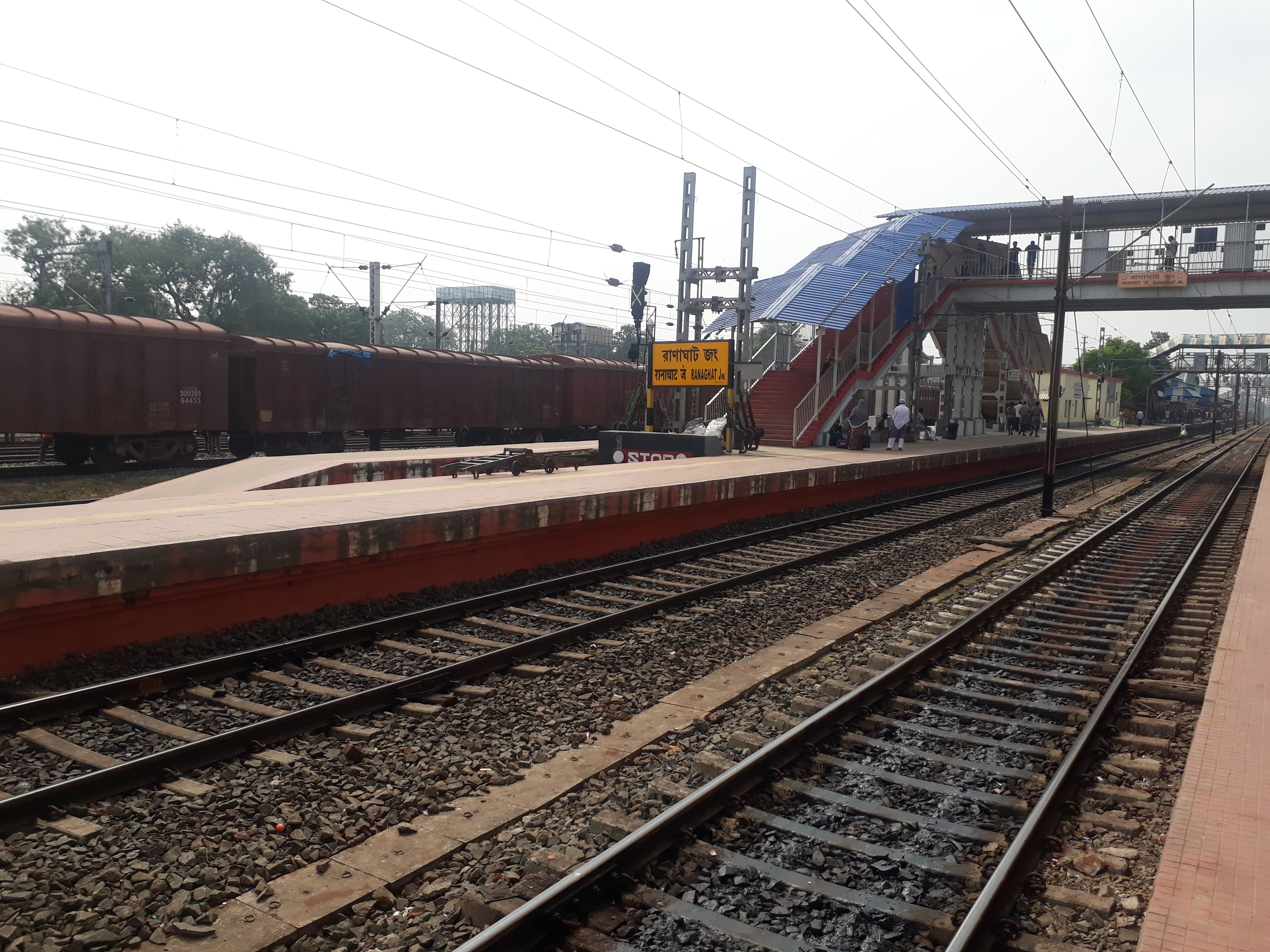
Ranaghat railway station platform

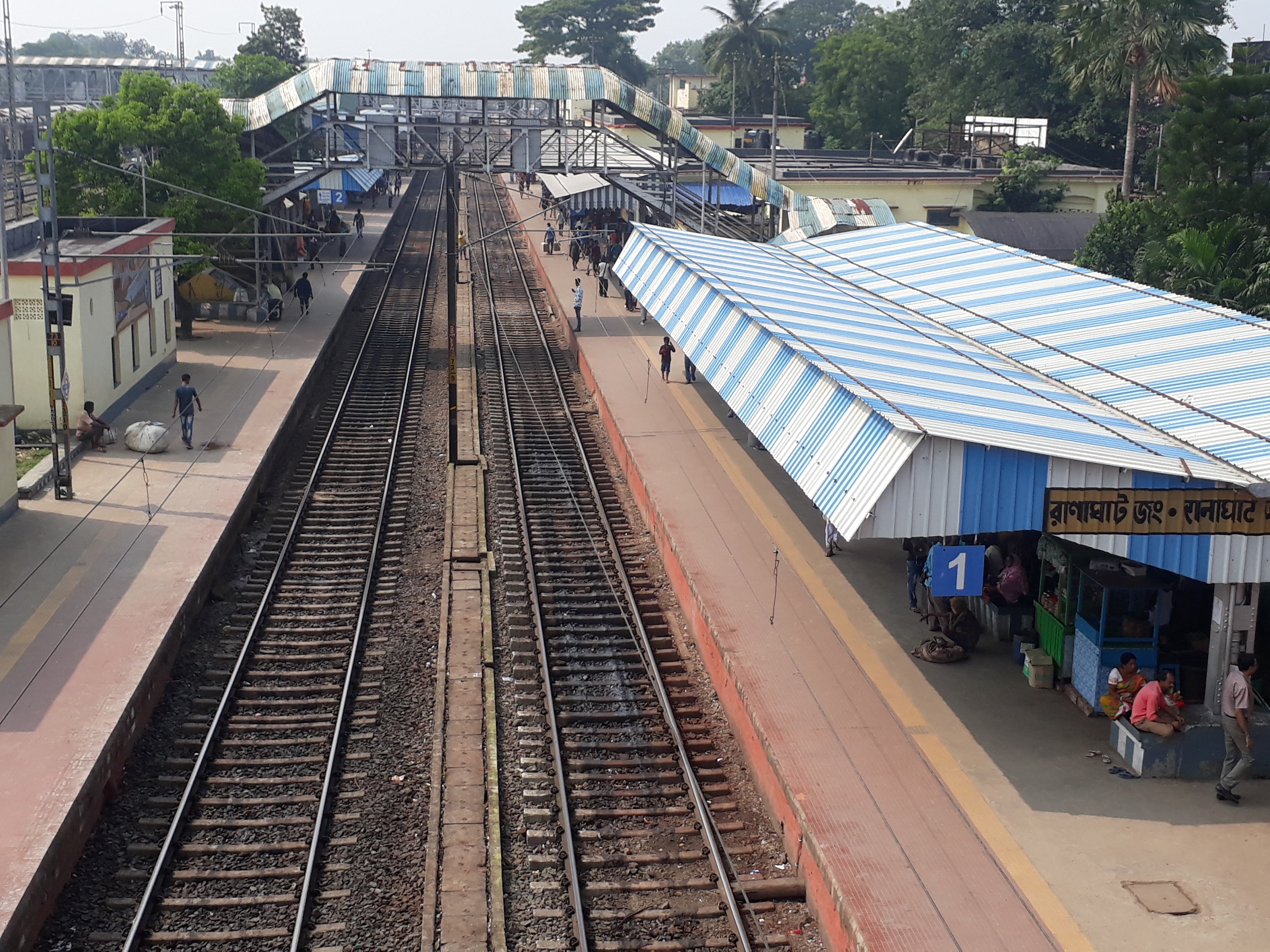
Top view of Ranaghat railway station
