= East Bengal Express =

Defunct train in India

Overview
- Service type: Railway train

Route
- Termini: Sealdah; Goalundo Ghat
- Service frequency: Daily

Technical
- Track gauge: 1,676 mm (5 ft 6 in)

The East Bengal Express was one of three trains operated between India and East Pakistan. The 256 kilometres (159 mi) long journey used to take 5 hrs 20 minutes, running at 48 kilometres per hour (30 mph). The East Bengal Express used to depart Sealdah at 23.40 hours & reach Goalundo Ghat at 05.00 hours. On return, the train used to depart Goalundo Ghat at 11.40 hours & reach Sealdah at 17.00 hours. Here is a brief on the importance of Goalundo Ghat in earlier years: "If one goes from Calcutta to Dacca the rail journey is broken at Goalundo and from there to Narayanganj is continued by steamer. The night mail from Calcutta deposits one at Goalundo in the early hours of the morning... It (Goalundo) is situated at the junction of the Padma, or Ganges, and the Brahmaputra, and daily services of steamers connect it with the railway systems at Narayanganj and Chandpur, and with the steamer services to Madaripur, Barisal, Sylhet, and Cachar. There are also daily services of steamers up the Padma to Digha Ghat in the dry season, and Buxar in the rains, and up the Brahmaputra to Dibrugarh. From that it will be seen that Goalundo occupies a very strong strategic position in the waterways of Bengal, a position which has been made much stronger by railway development." The rail link was permanently suspended at the outbreak of the Indo-Pakistani War of 1965.

== Overview ==
Prior to 1965, when armed conflict broke out between India and Pakistan, rail links existed between India and East Pakistan. Three trains ran between the two countries carrying goods and passengers: (1) East Bengal Express between Sealdah and Goalundo Ghat via Gede–Darshana (2) East Bengal Mail between Sealdah and Parbatipur Junction via Gede–Darshana, and (3) Barisal Express between Sealdah and Khulna via Petrapole–Benapole.

== History ==
Eastern Bengal Railway opened the line from Calcutta to Goalundo, on the southern bank of the Padma in 1871.
