= Mitali Express =

Train service connecting Bangladesh and India

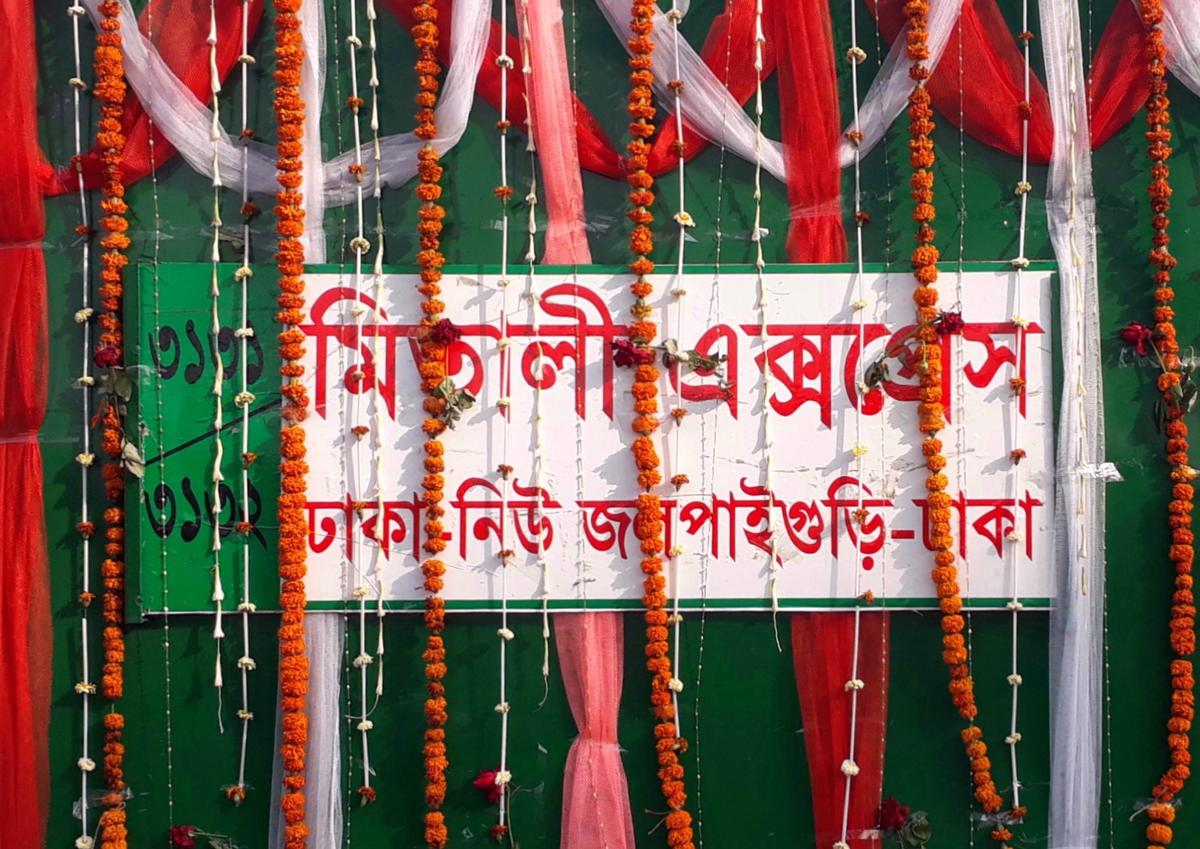
- Train Board of Mitali Express

Overview
- Service type: AC Express
- Locale: India & Bangladesh
- First service: 1 June 2022; 4 years ago
- Last service: 18 July 2024; 2 years ago
- Current operators: Northeast Frontier Railway zone of Indian Railways & Bangladesh Railway

Route
- Termini: New Jalpaiguri/Siliguri (NJP); Dhaka Cantonment (DHCA)
- Stops: 3 (2 technical halts)
- Distance travelled: 524 km (326 mi)
- Average journey time: 10 hours 15 mins
- Service frequency: Bi-Weekly
- Train number: 13131/13132

On-board services
- Classes: AC Chair Car (CC); First AC (1A)
- Seating arrangements: Yes
- Sleeping arrangements: Yes
- Auto-rack arrangements: Yes
- Catering facilities: Yes
- Observation facilities: LHB coach
- Entertainment facilities: No
- Baggage facilities: yes
- Other facilities: Food onboard

Technical
- Rolling stock: Bangladesh Railway Diesel Locomotives & Indian Railway Locomotives
- Track gauge: Broad gauge1,676 mm (5 ft 6 in)
- Electrification: Not Electrified
- Operating speed: 51.12 km/h (31.76 mph) with halts

The Mitali Express (13131/13132) train (Bengali: মিতালী এক্সপ্রেস) is an international express rail service which connects the Indian city of Siliguri with the Bangladeshi capital Dhaka every week. Together with the Maitree Express train and the Bandhan Express train, the Mitali Express train is the third modern-day fully air conditioned passenger train link between the Indian state of West Bengal and Bangladesh. Both the prime ministers of the two neighbouring countries officially inaugurated the non-stop passenger train with ten compartments on the new 513 km route from Dhaka on 26 March 2021, the day Bangladesh celebrated the golden jubilee of its independence. The prime minister of India was in Dhaka to mark the auspicious occasion of fifty years of independence of Bangladesh. After 56 years of stoppage, this train route recreates the previous Siliguri route between India and Bangladesh. A valid visa and passport is required beforehand to purchase a ticket for the Mitali Express train. Tickets are available at Dhaka Kamalapur railway station in Dhaka, Bangladesh and at New Jalpaiguri railway station in Siliguri, India.

Though the train was inaugurated on 26 March 2021, but in the wake of the global COVID-19 pandemic, its commercial run was postponed since its inauguration. However, the train made its first commercial run and resumed normal operations on 1 June 2022. Since 19 July 2024, the service was suspended indefinitely due to political unrest in Bangladesh. The Train is Short Terminated at Chilahati Currently Since 2025

== History ==
The Prime Minister of India, Narendra Modi, together with the Prime Minister of Bangladesh, Sheikh Hasina, jointly flagged off the New Jalpaiguri to Dhaka Mitali Express train service via video conference from Dhaka on 26 March 2021. Prime Minister Narendra Modi was in Dhaka to celebrate the fifty years of Independence of Bangladesh.

The train service was inaugurated on the occasion of Bangabandhu Sheikh Mujibur Rahman's birth centenary and the golden jubilee (fifty years) of Independence of Bangladesh.

However, the train could not be operated till June 2022 since its inauguration due to COVID-19 pandemic related restrictions. On 1 June 2022, Minister of Railways of India Ashwini Vaishnaw and his Bangladeshi counterpart Md. Nurul Islam Sujon from Delhi flagged off its first commercial run through video conference from Indian Railways Board's Conference Room at New Delhi, India.

=== Naming ===
Railway officials proposed four different names to the Prime Minister of Bangladesh for the name of the new train. These were Mitali, Sampriti, Suhrid and Bondhu. Prime Minister Sheikh Hasina chose the name Mitali. Mitali Express similar to Maitree Express and Bandhan Express is a Bengali name. The Bengali word Mitali means Friendship in English (Bengali: বন্ধুত্ব).

== Route ==
The train starts at Dhaka Cantonment railway station on the Bangladesh side, stopping at Parbatipur and Chilahati and then crosses the border to Haldibari. The distance between Dhaka and Chilahati is 453 km and from Chilahati to New Jalpaiguri is 71 km. Two extra coaches are added at Chilahati for passengers travelling from that area to India. The train then crosses the Indian side, stopping at Haldibari before reaching New Jalpaiguri railway station.

While the proposed halts of the train on the Indian side do not include Jalpaiguri railway station, there are long-standing demands for a stoppage at Jalpaiguri town.

== Fares ==
The fare is expected to be calculated on the basis of US Dollars. Though at the New Jalpaiguri station, the transactions will be made using Indian rupee. The ticket fare for a particular month will be decided on the basis of the exchange rate of Indian rupee with US Dollars on the first day of that month. As the train will solely be operated and maintained by Indian Railways, the rates of ticket fare will also be at their discretion. A 5% GST will be added to basic fare as well. In India, the tickets will be available at the dedicated PRS counter of New Jalpaiguri railway station, Guwahati Railway Station and Kolkata railway station.

== Timings and frequency ==
Since its inauguration, the Bi-weekly train runs on Sundays and Wednesdays from New Jalpaiguri and on Mondays and Thursdays from Dhaka Cantonment. However the stoppages at Haldibari and Chilahati are technical halts only. Passengers boarding or deboarding are not allowed at these two stations.

Timings as of now are: –

New Jalpaiguri to Dhaka
Train No.	Station	Arrival	Departure	Zone
13132	New Jalpaiguri	–	11:45 IST	NFR
13132	Haldibari	12:55 IST	13:05 IST	NFR
13132	Chilahati	13:55 BST	14:25 BST	BR
13132	Dhaka Cantonment	22:30 BST	–	BR

Dhaka to New Jalpaiguri
Train No.	Station	Arrival	Departure	Zone
13131	Dhaka Cantonment	–	21:50 BST	BR
13131	Chilahati	05:45 BST	06:15 BST	BR
13131	Haldibari	06:00 IST	06:30 IST	NFR
13131	New Jalpaiguri	07:15 IST	–	NFR

== Coach composition ==
Pure LHB coach in red-grey (used by Rajdhani Expresses) and sky blue-grey (used by Shatabdi Expresses) manufactured in India, are used for this train (same as Maitree Express) hauled by Indian locomotive from start was Bardhaman-based WDM-3A or WDM-3D so was Siliguri-based WDP-4D. The train has 10 coaches. 4 AC Executive Class, 4 AC Chair Car and 2 power car brake vans.

Legends

LRM/GD/EOG/SLR	H-	C-
Generator cum luggage van	Executive Chair (EC)	AC Chair Car (CC)

Rake composition of 13132 New Jalpaiguri to Dhaka

Loco	1	2	3	4	5	6	7	8	9	10
	EOG	H1	H2	H3	H4	C1	C2	C3	C4	EOG

- while 13131 Dhaka to New Jalpaiguri has reverse rake composition of 13132.

== See also ==
- Bandhan Express
- Maitree Express
- Samjhauta Express
- Transport between India and Bangladesh#Rail links
