= Darshana railway station =

Railway station in Bangladesh

Darshana দর্শনা

General information
- Location: Darsana, Chuadanga, Bangladesh; Bangladesh
- Coordinates: 23°30′13″N 88°47′25″E
- System: Bangladesh Railway Station
- Owner: Bangladesh Railway
- Operator: Bangladesh Railway
- Line: Chilahati-Parbatipur-Santahar-Darshana Line
- Platforms: 3
- Tracks: 5

Construction
- Structure type: Standard (on ground station)
- Parking: Yes
- Cycle facilities: Yes
- Accessible: Disabled access Food Plaza Kiosks WC Taxi Stand
- Architect: On Ground

Other information
- Status: Functioning
- Station code: DSN
- Zone(s): West Zone
- Division(s): Pakshi
- Classification: Domestic/ International

History
- Opened: 1871; 155 years ago
- Former names: Eastern Bengal Railway

Services
Preceding station	Bangladesh Railway	Following station
Darshana Junction towards Chilahati	Chilahati–Parbatipur–Santahar–Darshana	Terminus
Location

Darshana Railway Station (Bengali: দর্শনা রেলওয়ে স্টেশন) is a border railway station in Darsana, Bangladesh, situated in Damurhuda Upazila of Chuadanga District, in Khulna Division. It is a rail transit point and a border checkpoint on the India-Bangladesh border.

== History ==
Darshana to Jagotee, Kushtia rail line was first opened on 15 November 1861. It was 53.11 kilometres (33.00 mi) long broad gauge line. It is the first rail road in East Bengal. This rail road established sugarcane supply chain between Darsana (Carew) and Jagotee Sugar mills. Later on this rail road was extended up to Goalundo Ghat. Darshana - Rana Ghat (India) -Benapole -Jessore -Khulna passenger railway communication continued until the early 1960s between East Pakistan and India. Then Darshana to Jessore railway was established and the service discontinued. Darsana station came up with the Eastern Bengal Railway opening the line from Calcutta to Goalundo Ghat, in 1871.

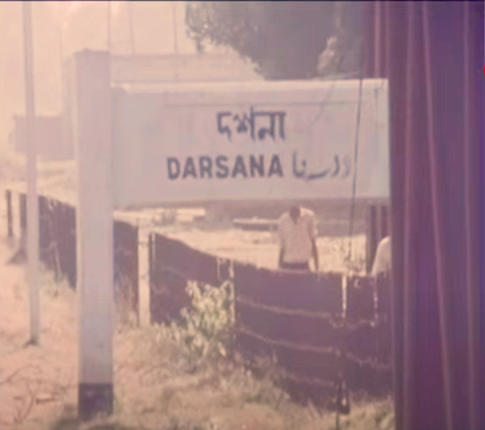
Darsana Railway Station in 1971

The Maitree Express passes through this station.

== Main lines ==
Line	Electrification	Gauge	Number of Tracks
Towards Gede and Ranaghat Junction	Yes, Gede to Ranaghat. Darshana to Gede not electrified	5'6" (1676 mm) Indian Broad Gauge	2
Towards Isharwadi Junction	No	5'6" (1676 mm) Indian Broad Gauge	2
