= Darshana, Chuadanga =

Municipality in Bangladesh

Coordinates: 23.526555°N 88.799042°E

Darshana (Bengali: দর্শনা) is a small industrial township and municipality in the southwestern region of Khulna Division, Bangladesh.

== Location ==
It is in the Chuadanga District and shares domestic borders with the Howli Union in the northwest, Begampur Union in the east and Kuralgachhi Union in the west. On its southwest lies the Nadia District (in the state of West Bengal, India).

It has an area of only 24.56 square kilometres (9.48 sq mi) but population is 33,396.

== Description ==
Carew & Co (Bangladesh) Ltd is the biggest sugar mill in Bangladesh. It was established in the British period. Darshana has a land port with India and is the first entrance point for trains to Calcutta, India.

The Darshana to Jagotee, Kushtia rail line is the first rail road in East Bengal. Darsana station was opened when the Eastern Bengal Railway opened the line from Calcutta to Goalundo Ghat, in 1871.

== Institutions ==
There are 10 primary schools, 4 secondary schools, and 1 college in the municipality.
