= Gede, Nadia =

Gede
- Village
- Location in West Bengal, India Gede (India)
- Coordinates: 23.48904°N 88.78037°E
- Country: India
- State: West Bengal
- District: Nadia

Population (2011)
  - Total: 5,396

Languages
  - Official: Bengali, English
- Time zone: UTC+5:30 (IST)
- Telephone/STD code: 03472
- Lok Sabha constituency: Ranaghat
- Vidhan Sabha constituency: Krishnaganj
- Website: nadia.gov.in

Gede is a village and a border checkpoint in the Krishnaganj CD block in the Krishnanagar Sadar subdivision of the Nadia district in the state of West Bengal, India.

== Border check point ==
Gede has an Indian land custom station of the India-Bangladesh border. The land custom station on the Bangladesh side is at Darshana.

Gede railway station is the terminal station on the Sealdah-Gede section of Kolkata Suburban Railway system.

== Demographics ==
According to the 2011 Census of India, Gede had a total population of 5,396, of which 2,851 (53%) were males and 2,545 (47%) were females. Population in the age range 0–6 years was 433. The total number of literate persons in Gede was 3,660 (73.75% of the population over 6 years).

== Geography ==
Cities and towns in Krishnanagr Sadar subdivision of Nadia district
M: municipal town/ city, CT: census town, R: rural/ urban centre, H: place of historical/ religious interest, T: place of tourist interest.
Owing to space constraints in the small map, the actual locations in a larger map may vary slightly

=== Location ===
Gede is located at 23.48904°N 88.78037°E.

=== Area overview ===
Nadia district is mostly alluvial plains lying to the east of Hooghly River, locally known as Bhagirathi. The alluvial plains are cut across by such distributaries as Jalangi, Churni and Ichhamati. With these rivers getting silted up, floods are a recurring feature. The Krishnanagar Sadar subdivision, presented in the map alongside, has the Bhagirathi on the west, with Purba Bardhaman district lying across the river. The long stretch along the Bhagirathi has many swamps. The area between the Bhagirathi and the Jalangi, which flows through the middle of the subdivision, is known as Kalantar, a low-lying tract of black clay soil. A big part of the subdivision forms the Krishnanagar-Santipur Plain, which occupies the central part of the district. The Jalangi, after flowing through the middle of the subdivision, turns right and joins the Bhagirathi. On the south-east, the Churni separates the Krishnanagar-Santipur Plain from the Ranaghat-Chakdaha Plain. The east forms the boundary with Bangladesh. The subdivision is moderately urbanized. 20.795% of the population lives in urban areas and 79.205% lives in rural areas.

Note: The map alongside presents some of the notable locations in the subdivision. All places marked in the map are linked in the larger full screen map. All the four subdivisions are presented with maps on the same scale – the size of the maps vary as per the area of the subdivision.
