= Barisal Express =

Defunct train in India

The Barishal Express was a railway train that was one of three train services running between India and Bangladesh (then East Pakistan).

== History ==
The Barishal Express launched in 1884. The train connected the Indian city of Kolkata (then Calcutta) with the city of Khulna in Bangladesh, with a link train from Rupsa to Bagerhat for connecting Barishal. The train used to take 4 hours to complete the 176 kilometres (109 mi) journey. The link train used to take another 1 hrs 45 minutes to connect Bagerhat, 74 kilometres (46 mi) away from Khulna. The railway link was suspended at the outbreak of the Indo-Pakistani War of 1965. In 1972, the route reopened for 2 years for goods train service.

An agreement was signed between India and Bangladesh in July 2000 to re-establish the train link. Feasibility studies had been going on since 1994. The Bandhan Express is a new train recreating this route in the 21st century. The immigration checks have been moved to Calcutta train station to avoid losing hours waiting at the border. New Railway line to Barishal is being constructed, the line will bifurcate at Rupsanagar from the Mongla Port railway line & then head eastward towards Jatharpur, Sakambhuj, Bagerhat & then end at Barishal.

== See also ==
- Bandhan Express
- Transport between India and Bangladesh § Rail links
