= Goalundo Ghat =

Town in Dhaka Division, Bangladesh

Goalandaghat or Goalanda গোয়ালন্দঘাট
- Municipality
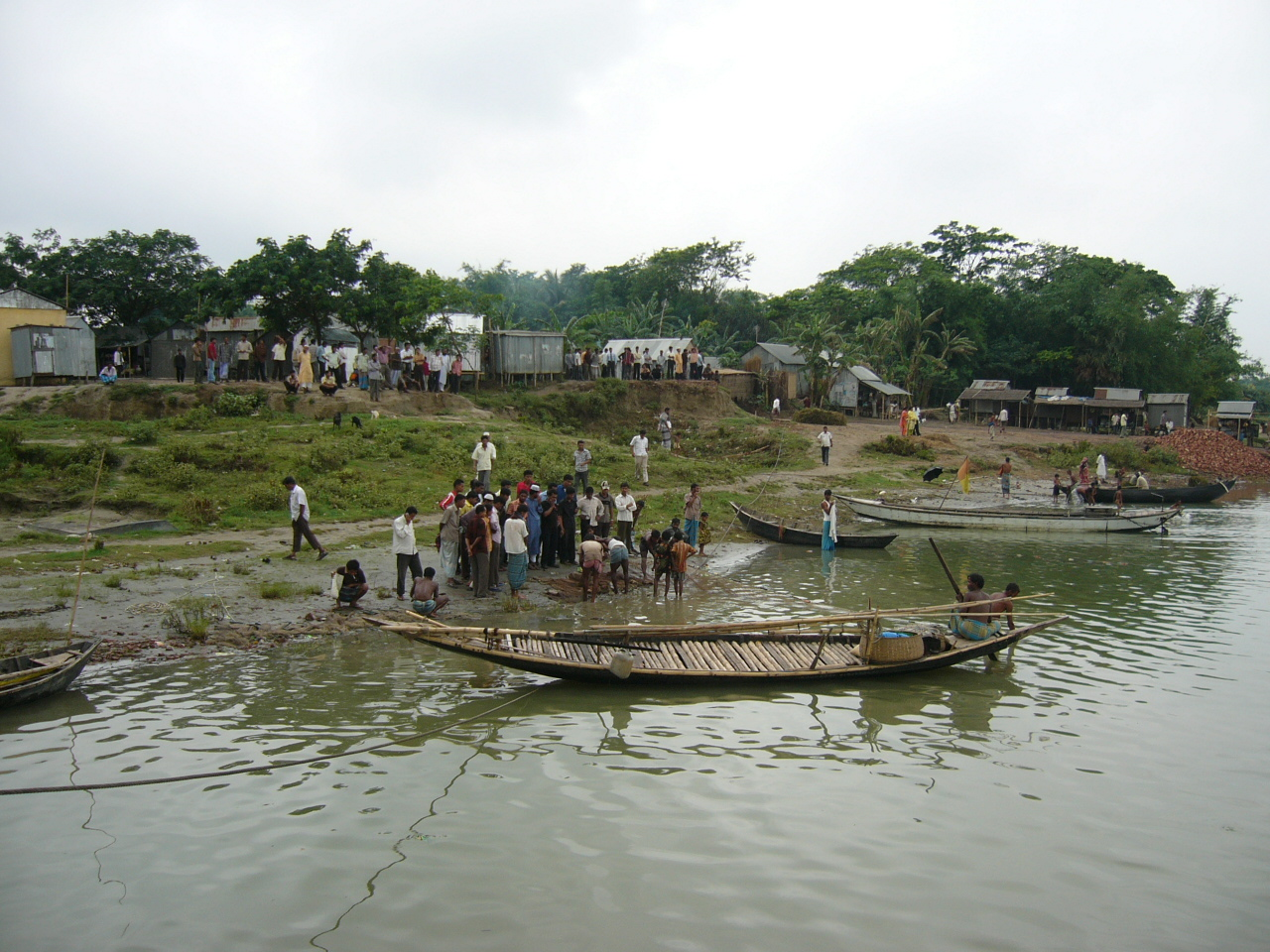
- A view of Goalandaghat in Bangladesh

- Location in Bangladesh
- Coordinates: 23°44′N 89°45.7′E
- Country: Bangladesh
- Division: Dhaka Division
- District: Rajbari District
- Upazila: Goalandaghat Upazila

Area
  - Total: 149.03 km^{2} (57.54 sq mi)

Population (1991)
  - Total: 91,675
  - Density: 615.14/km^{2} (1,593.2/sq mi)
- Time zone: UTC+6 (BST)
- Website: Official Map of Goalandaghat

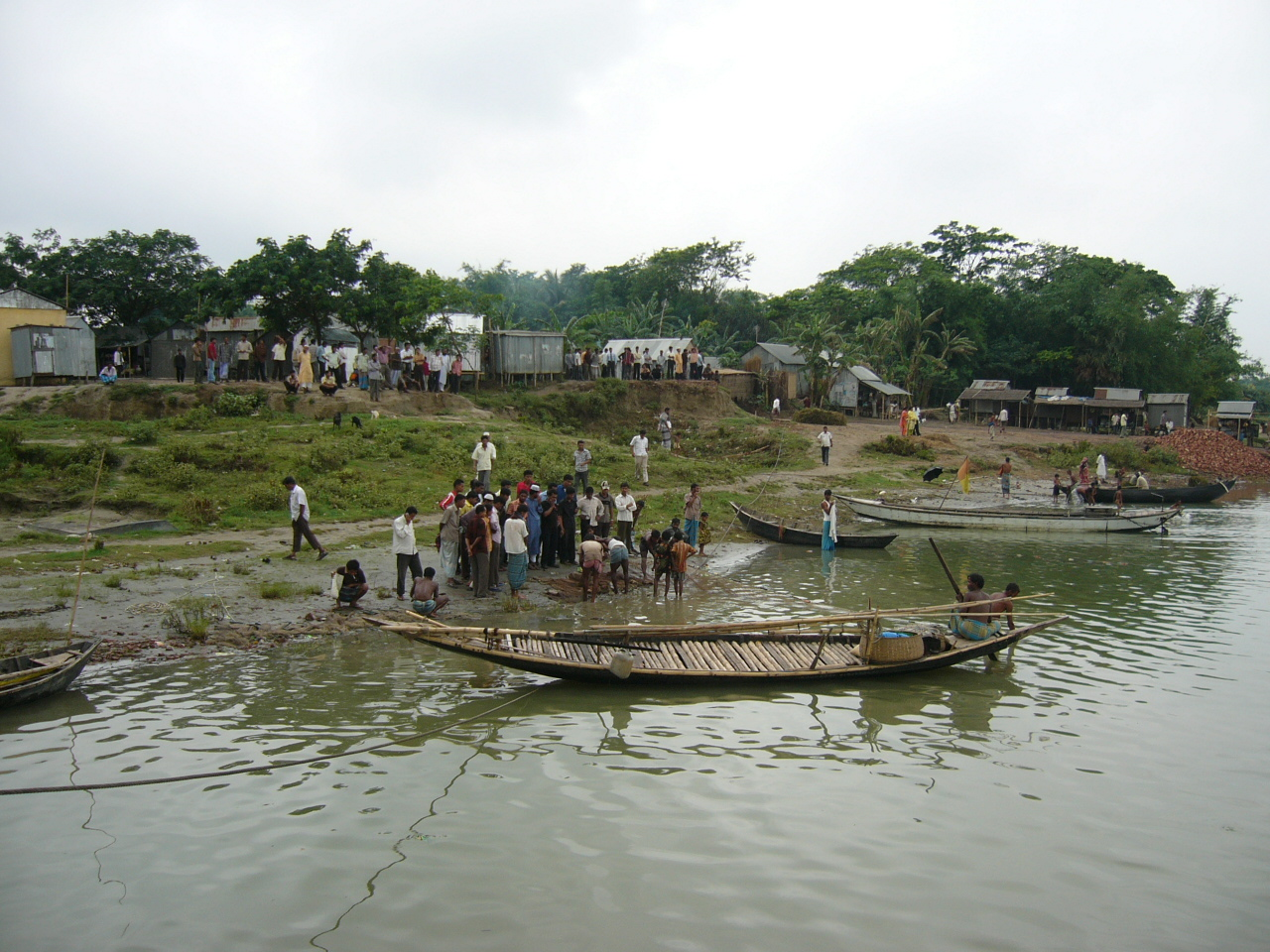
Goalanda Ghat

Goalundo Ghat (also spelled Goalanda and Goalondo; Bengali: গোয়ালন্দঘাট) is a small town and pourasabha in Goalandaghat Upazila, Rajbari District, Dhaka Division, Bangladesh. There are two railway stops in the town, one at Goalundo Ghat and one at Goalundo Bazar. The town has an area of 4.86 km^{2} and a population of 22,000 inhabitants (2001 estimate).

== Historical significance ==
The Eastern Bengal Railway opened the line from Kolkata to Goalundo, on the southern bank of the Padma in 1871. Goalundo was for many years a major transportation hub for travel to eastern Bengal, Assam and Burma. According to a colonial account of the river port, “If one goes from Calcutta to Dacca the rail journey is broken at Goalundo and from there to Narayanganj is continued by steamer. The night mail from Calcutta deposits one at Goalundo in the early hours of the morning. It is situated at the junction of the Padma, or Ganges, and the Brahmaputra, and daily services of steamers connect it with the railway systems at Narayanganj and Chandpur, and with the steamer services to Madaripur, Barisal, Sylhet, and Cachar. There are also daily services of steamers up the Padma to Digha Ghat, Patna in the dry season, and Buxar in the rains, and up the Brahmaputra to Dibrugarh. From that it will be seen that Goalundo occupies a very strong strategic position in the waterways of Bengal, a position which has been made much stronger by railway development". The use of Burmese timber in the nearby Amirabad Estate stands as evidence of bustling trade with Chittagong and Arakan. The Zamindars of Amirabad controlled much of the farmland around the river port.

Even after partition of India in 1947, the East Bengal Express ran up to September 1965. The Goalundo Ghat railway link has since been used only for internal travel in Bangladesh.

== Changing scenario ==
Bus/road travel has since gained primary importance in Bangladesh. Most people use buses for travel from Dhaka and other places to Benapole and then cross over the border for links to Kolkata. For a long time road transport has been using the Daulatdia-Paturia ferry crossing nearby. The ferry also carries long-distance buses across the Padma.

The government of Bangladesh has invited in November 2011 international tenders for the construction of the 6.1 km long second bridge across the Padma connecting Paturia and Daulatdia on a public-private partnership basis at a cost of 2 billion dollars.
