= Deulia =

- Census Town
- Location in West Bengal, India Deulia (India)
- Coordinates: 22.696426°N 88.684432°E
- Country: India
- State: West Bengal
- District: North 24 Parganas

Area
  - Total: 2.74 km^{2} (1.06 sq mi)

Population (2011)
  - Total: 9,633
  - Density: 3,520/km^{2} (9,110/sq mi)

Languages
  - Official: Bengali, English
- Time zone: UTC+5:30 (IST)
- PIN: 743424
- Telephone code: 03217
- Vehicle registration: WB
- Lok Sabha constituency: Barasat
- Vidhan Sabha constituency: Deganga
- Website: north24parganas.nic.in

Deulia is a census town in the Deganga CD block in the Barasat Sadar subdivision of the North 24 Parganas district in the state of West Bengal, India.

== Geography ==
Cities, towns and locations in Barasat subdivision, North 24 Parganas
M: municipal town, CT: census town, R: rural/ urban centre, H: historical centre
Owing to space constraints in the small map, the actual locations in a larger map may vary slightly

=== Location ===
Deulia is located at 22.696426°N 88.684432°E.

Berachampa and Deganga are located nearby.

=== Area overview ===
The area covered in the map alongside is largely a part of the north Bidyadhari Plain. located in the lower Ganges Delta. The country is flat. It is a little raised above flood level and the highest ground borders the river channels.54.67% of the people of the densely populated area lives in the urban areas and 45.33% lives in the rural areas.

Note: The map alongside presents some of the notable locations in the subdivision. All places marked in the map are linked in the larger full screen map.

== Civic administration ==
=== CD block HQ ===
The headquarters of Deganga CD block are located at Deulia.

== Demographics ==
According to the 2011 Census of India, Deulia had a total population of 9,633, of which 4,938 (51%) were males and 4,725 (49%) were females. Population below 0–6 years was 895. The total number of literate persons in Deulia was 7,438 (85.12% of the population over 6 years).

== Infrastructure ==
As per District Census Handbook 2011, Deulia covered an area of 2.7393 km^{2}. It had 5 primary schools, 3 middle schools, 3 secondary school and 1 senior secondary school. The nearest degree college was 0.5 km away at Kaulkepara. The nearest hospital was 12 km away, the nearest dispensary/ health centre (without any bed) was 1 km away, the nearest family welfare centre was 12 km away, the nearest maternity and child welfare centre (without any bed) was 1 km away and the nearest maternity clinic was 15 km away.

== Transport ==
State Highway 2 passes through Deulia.

== See also ==
Map Deganga on Page 445 of District Census Handbook.
