= Chandraketugarh =

Archaeological site in West Bengal, India

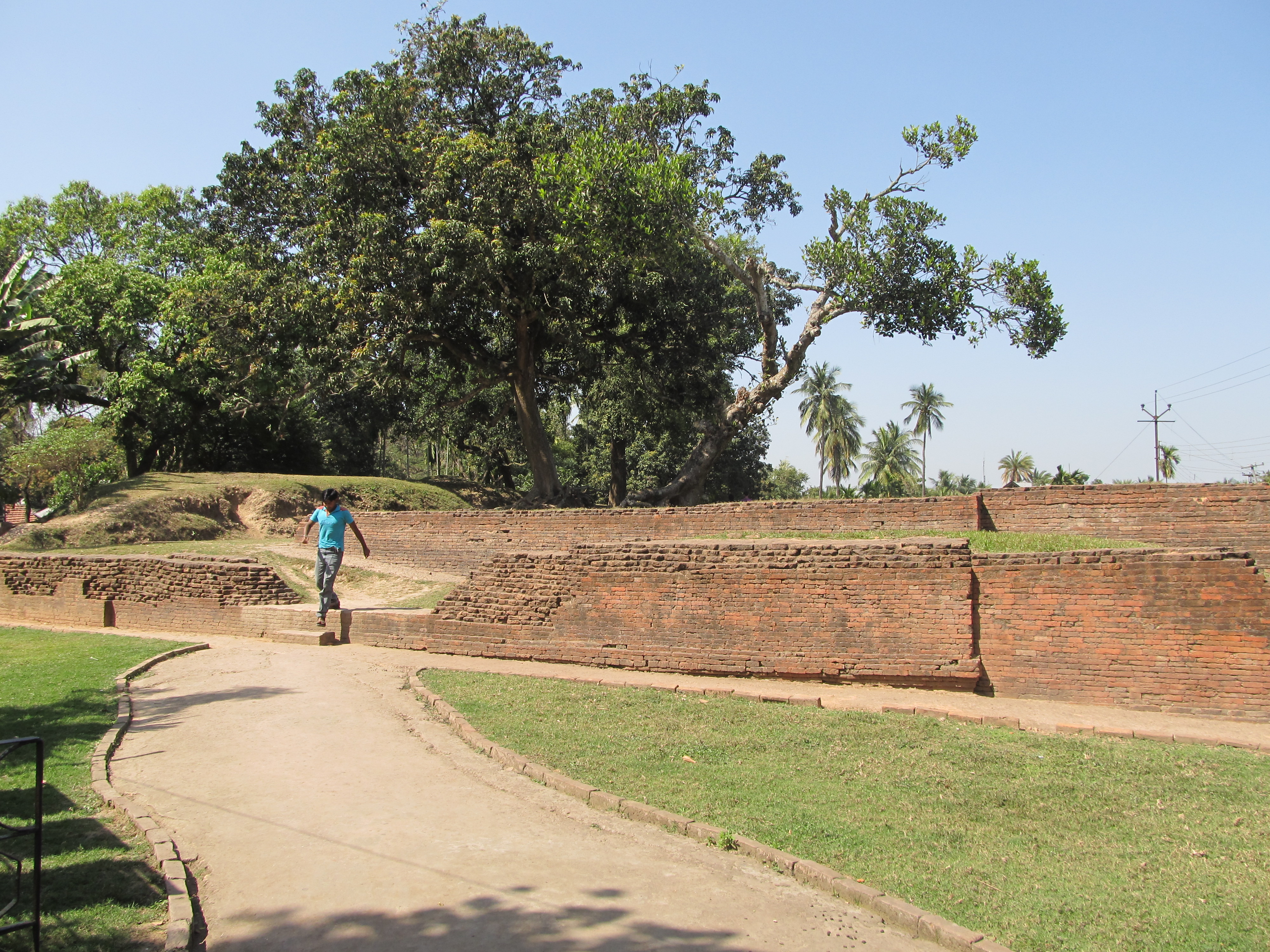
- The mound of Khana-Mihir or Barahamihir on Prithiba road, Berachampa (Chandraketugarh ruins)

- Location within West Bengal
- 22°41′52″N 88°41′18″E
- Type: Settlement
- Location: West Bengal, India

History
- Built: 400 BCE to 800 BCE
- Abandoned: 12th century CE

Chandraketugarh, located in the Ganges Delta, are a cluster of villages in the 24 Parganas district of West Bengal, about 35 kilometres (22 mi) north-east of Kolkata and about 25 kilometres west of Basirhat. The name Chandraketugarh comes from a local legend of a medieval king of this name. This civilization can perhaps be identified with the Gangaridai of Graeco-Roman accounts. In early historic times, Chandraketugarh was connected to the Ganga by the Bidyadhari River and must have been an important centre of trade and possibly also a political centre.

The Asutosh Museum of Indian Art conducted an excavation between 1957 and 1968, which revealed relics of several historical periods, although the chronological classification of the relics remains incomplete. Many of the Chandraketugarh items and terracottas are now in collections of museums in India and abroad; many of them are a part of private collections.

According to the List of Monuments of National Importance in West Bengal (serial no. N-WB-1), Chandraketu's Fort is an ASI listed monument.

== Location ==
It is located in West Bengal.

=== Transportation ===
==== Air ====
Chandraketugarh can be reached by car from Dum Dum Airport (also known as Netaji Subhas Chandra Bose International Airport) which will take all together 2 hours.

==== Train ====
Harua Road railway station is the nearest railway station to Chandraketugarh.

==== Road ====
Chandraketugarh is situated at a distance of about 50 kilometres from Kolkata and can be reached by road, via Barasat. The journey takes around 2 hours. From Ultadanga and Espalanade, regular buses are available to Barachampa. From there, you can easily reach Chandraketugarh.

Cities, towns and locations in Barasat subdivision, North 24 Parganas
M: municipal town, CT: census town, R: rural/ urban centre, H: historical centre
Owing to space constraints in the small map, the actual locations in a larger map may vary slightly

== Legend ==
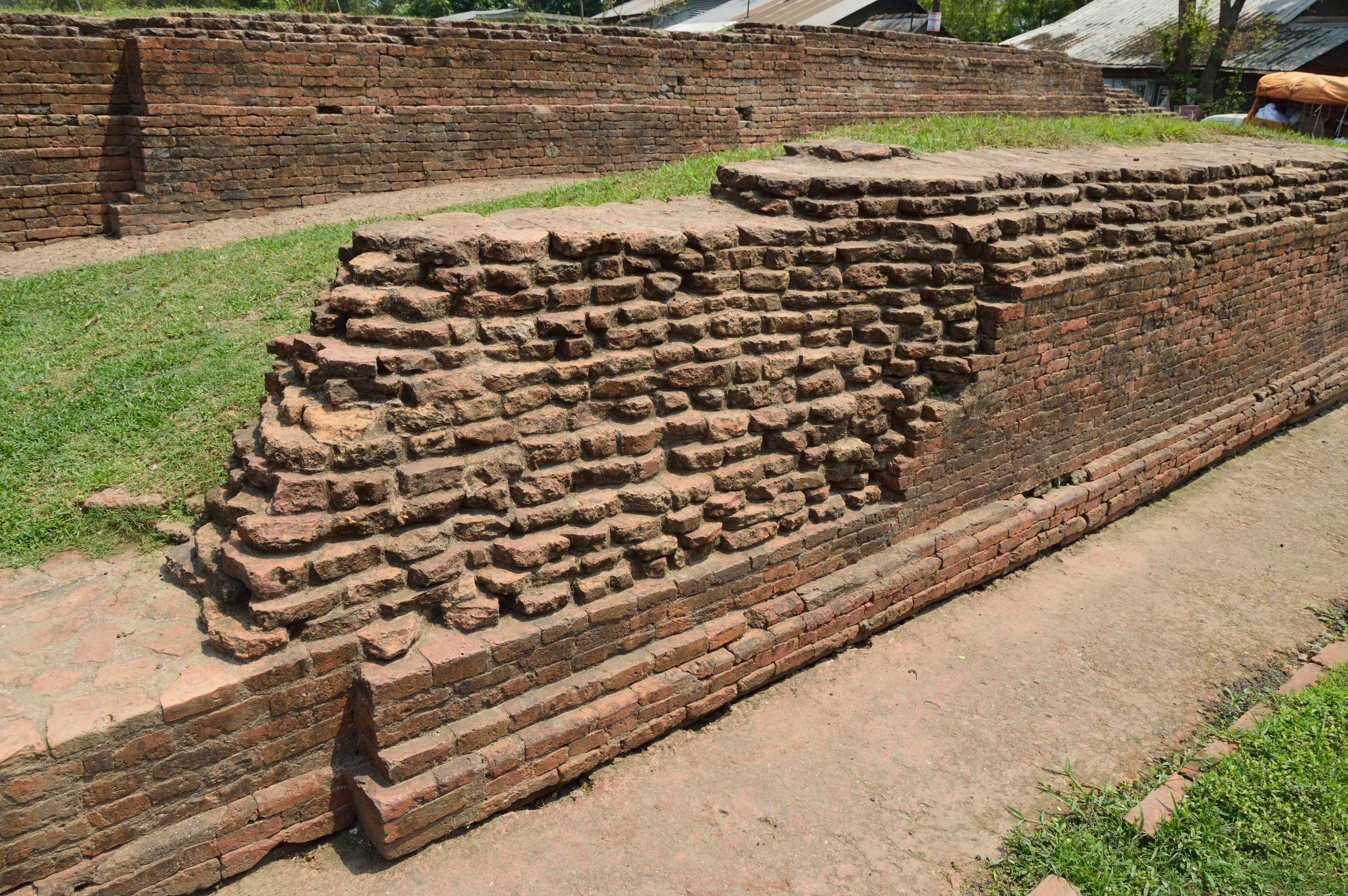
Excavated Brick Structure of Khana-Mihir Mound, Chandraketugarh, Berachampa, North 24 parganas district.

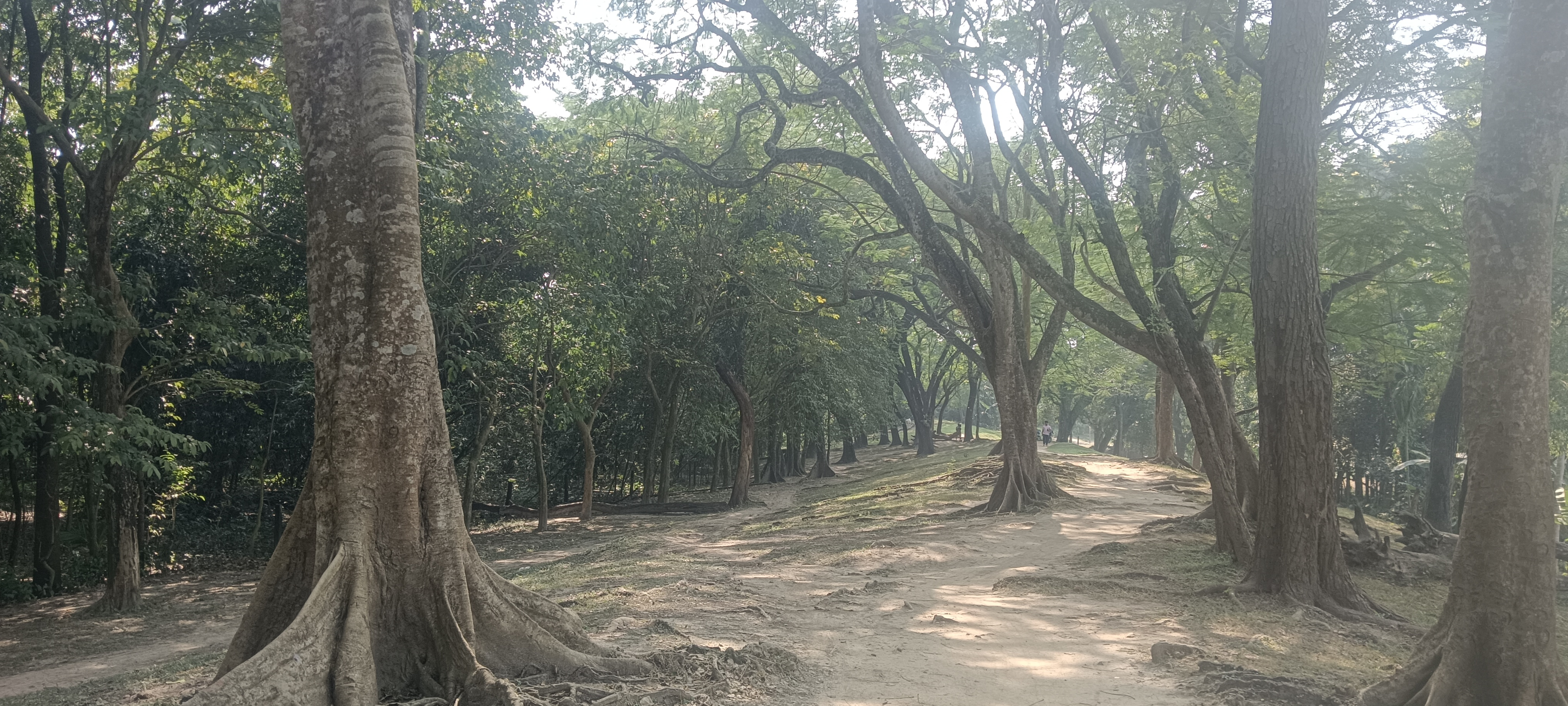
Chandraketu's Fort at Hatipur, North 24 parganas district.

The name of this site is derived from the mythical Hindu king of the medieval period, Chandraketu. A mound at the Berachampa village (Deuliya), off the Barasat-Basirhat Road, used to be called Chandraketur Garh (fort of Chandraketu), which was later compounded as Chandraketugarh. The legend of Khana, a medieval Bengali language poet and astrologer from the 9th to 12th centuries AD (also known as Lilavati in some traditions), is closely tied to the ancient site of Chandraketugarh. At this site, a mound has been found with the names of Khana and Mihir, suggesting their connection to the area. Khana is also the daughter-in-law of the astronomer and mathematician Varāhamihira (505 – 587). Varāhamihira, often called Mihira or Varaha, was one of the Nine Gems (Navaratna) in the court of the Indian emperor Chandragupta II 'Vikramaditya'.

It is widely believed that Khana was Varahamihira's daughter-in-law, and an accomplished astrologer, becoming thereby a potential threat to Varahamihira's scientific career. However, she exceeded him in the accuracy of her predictions, and at some point, either her husband (or father-in-law) or a hired hand (or possibly Khana herself under great duress) cut off her tongue to silence her prodigious talent.

There is another heritage mosque in the name of Pir Gorachand (an Arab missionary of 14th century named Syed Abbas Ali).

== History ==
A shot of Chandraketugarh Khana Mihirer Dhipi

Chandraketugarh is thought to be a part of the ancient kingdom Gangaridai that was first described by Ptolemy in his famous work Geographica (150 CE). A recent archaeological study being conducted by a team from IIT Kharagpur, believes that King Sandrocottus (mentioned by Greek explorer Megasthenes) was Chandraketu, whose fort Megasthenes visited India in the third century BCE, after Alexander's invasion of India, and gives a detailed account of what he saw in Indica. He mentions King Sandrocottus as one of the most powerful kings of Gangaridai, the Gangetic delta that spread over the five mouths of the river and was a continuum of a landmass comprising Anga, Banga and Kalinga. The history of Chandraketugarh dates back to almost the 3rd century BCE, during the pre-Mauryan era. Artifacts suggest that the site was continuously inhabited and flourished through the Shunga-Kushana period, onwards through the Gupta period and finally into the Pala-Sena period. Archaeological studies suggest that Chandraketugarh was an important town and a port city. It had a high encircling wall complete with a rampart and moat. The residents were involved in various crafts and mercantile activities. Although the religious inclinations of the people are unclear, hints of the beginning of some future cults can be seen in the artefacts. Some of the potteries carry inscriptions in Kharoshthi and Brahmi scripts.

Period	Dynasty	Year
Period I	Pre-Maurya	600-300 BCE
Period II	Maurya	300-185 BCE
Period III	Shunga	185 BCE - 50 CE
Period IV	Kushan	50-300 CE
Period V	Gupta	300-500 CE
Period VI	Post-Gupta	500-750 CE
Period VII	Pala-Chandra-Sena	750-1250 CE

After these periods, there was no such example of any other civilization on the ruin of Chandraketugarh.

== Excavated archeological objects ==
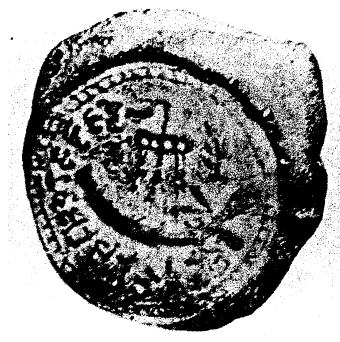
Terracotta seal depicting ship found in West Bengal, dated between 400 BCE and 100 BCE

Brahmi inscriptions with Megalithic graffiti symbols read "yojanani setuvandhat arddhasatah dvipa tamraparni", meaning "The island of Tamraparni (ancient Sri Lanka) is at a distance of 50 yojanas from Setuvandha (Rameswaram in Tamil Nadu). The mast of a ship with Vijayasinha's seal, describing the marriage of Vijayasinha (the son of the king of Sinhapura of Vanga) to Kuveni, the indigenous "Yakkha queen of Tamraparni". Chandraketugarh features many examples of terracotta art, displaying an unusual degree of precision and craftsmanship. These plaques are comparable to those found at other better-known sites such as Kaushambi and Ahichhatra. The terracotta plaques from these sites often carry similar motifs executed in nearly identical fashion. This similarity suggests an established communication link and common cultural heritage among these sites.

Finds include Northern Black Polished Ware (NBPW) relics, later wares dated from about 400 BCE to 100 BCE and approximately contemporary with the Maurya period, as well as from the more recent Kushanas and Gupta periods. Terracotta seals from Chandraketugarh (400 BCE to 100 BCE) depict seagoing vessels containing corn. The ships have a single mast with a square sail.

Many silver punch-marked coins and a few gold coins have been unearthed from Chandraketugarh, including a gold coin of Chandragupta-Kumardevi. Many semi-precious stone beads were also found here, along with items made of ivory and bone. Even a few wooden objects have survived. A museum has been built near the site depicting largely collections of Dilip Kumar Moitey, a retired school teacher and amateur archaeologist.

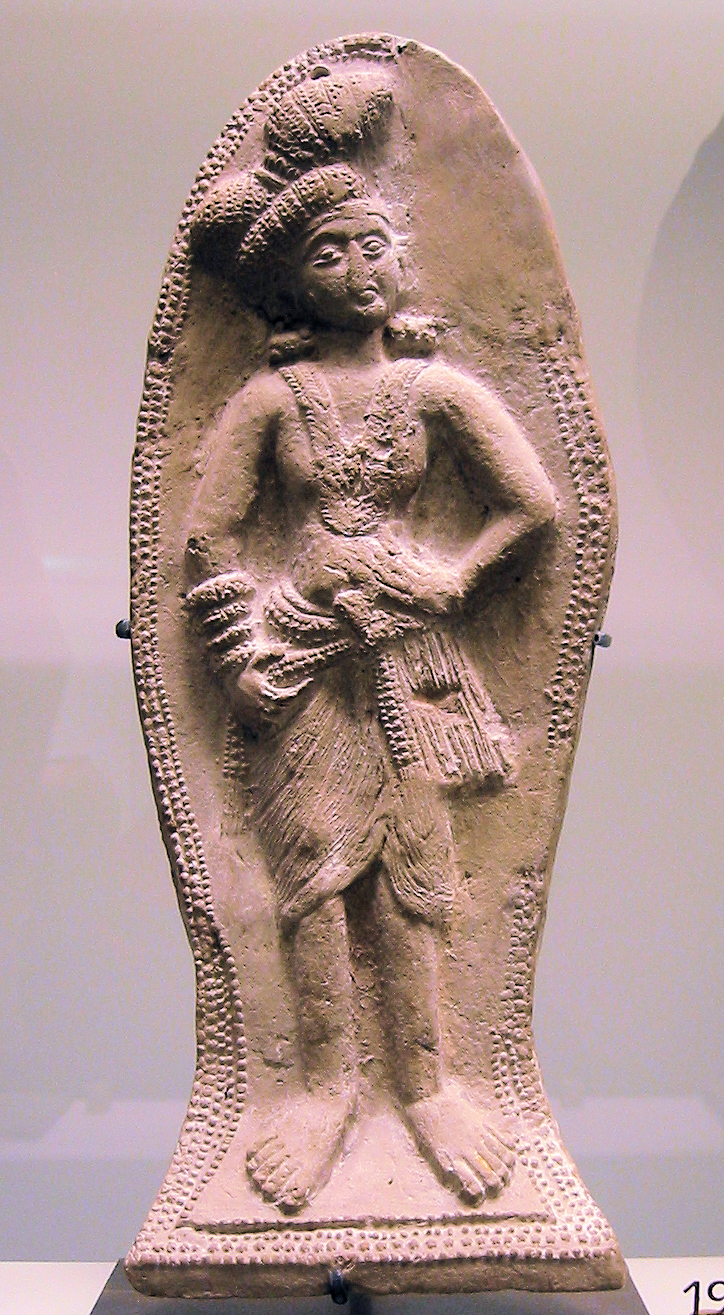
Chandraketugarh. Sunga 2nd-1st century BCE

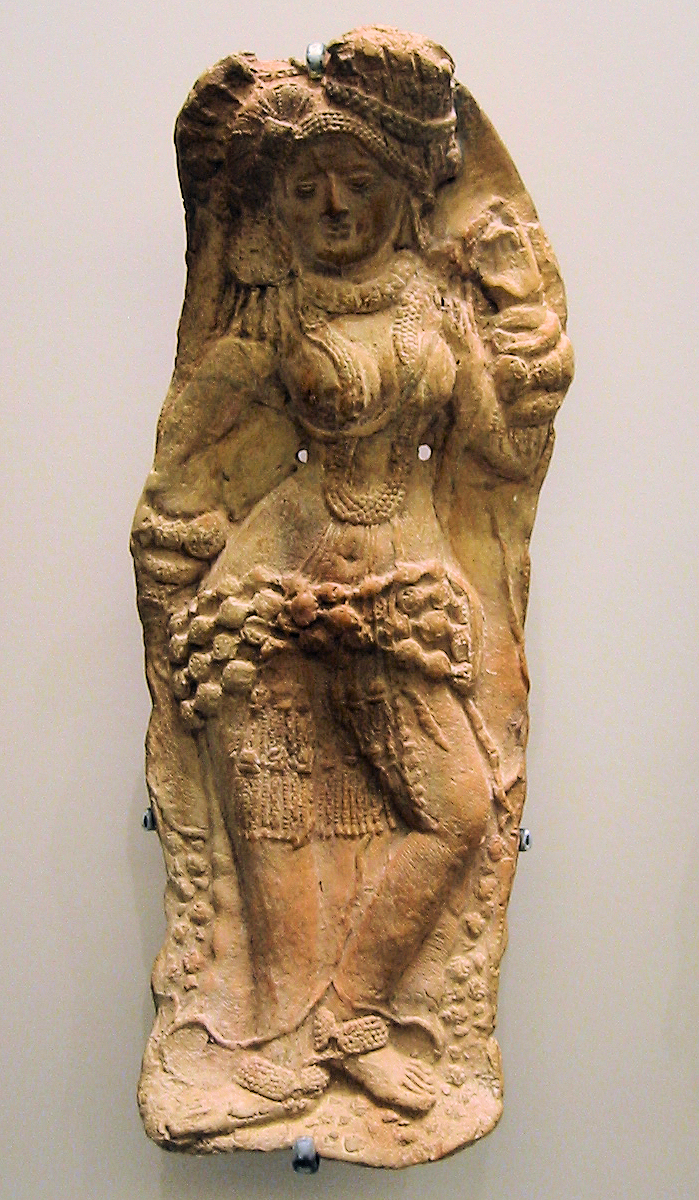
Chandraketugarh. Sunga Fecondity

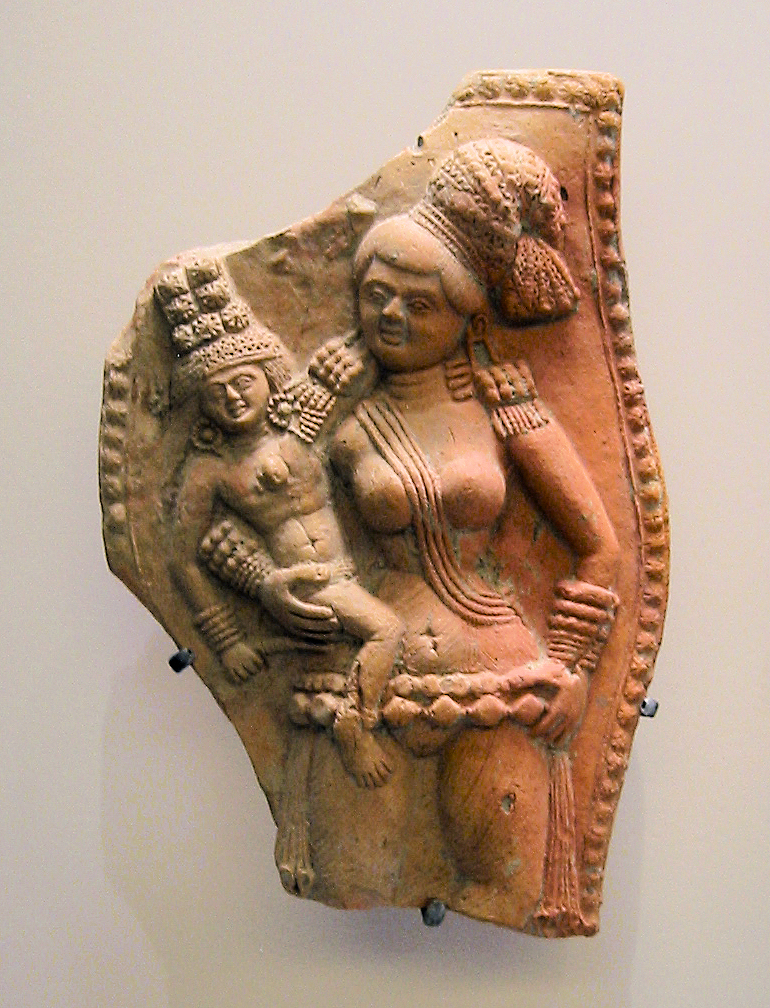
Chandraketugarh. Sunga With Child

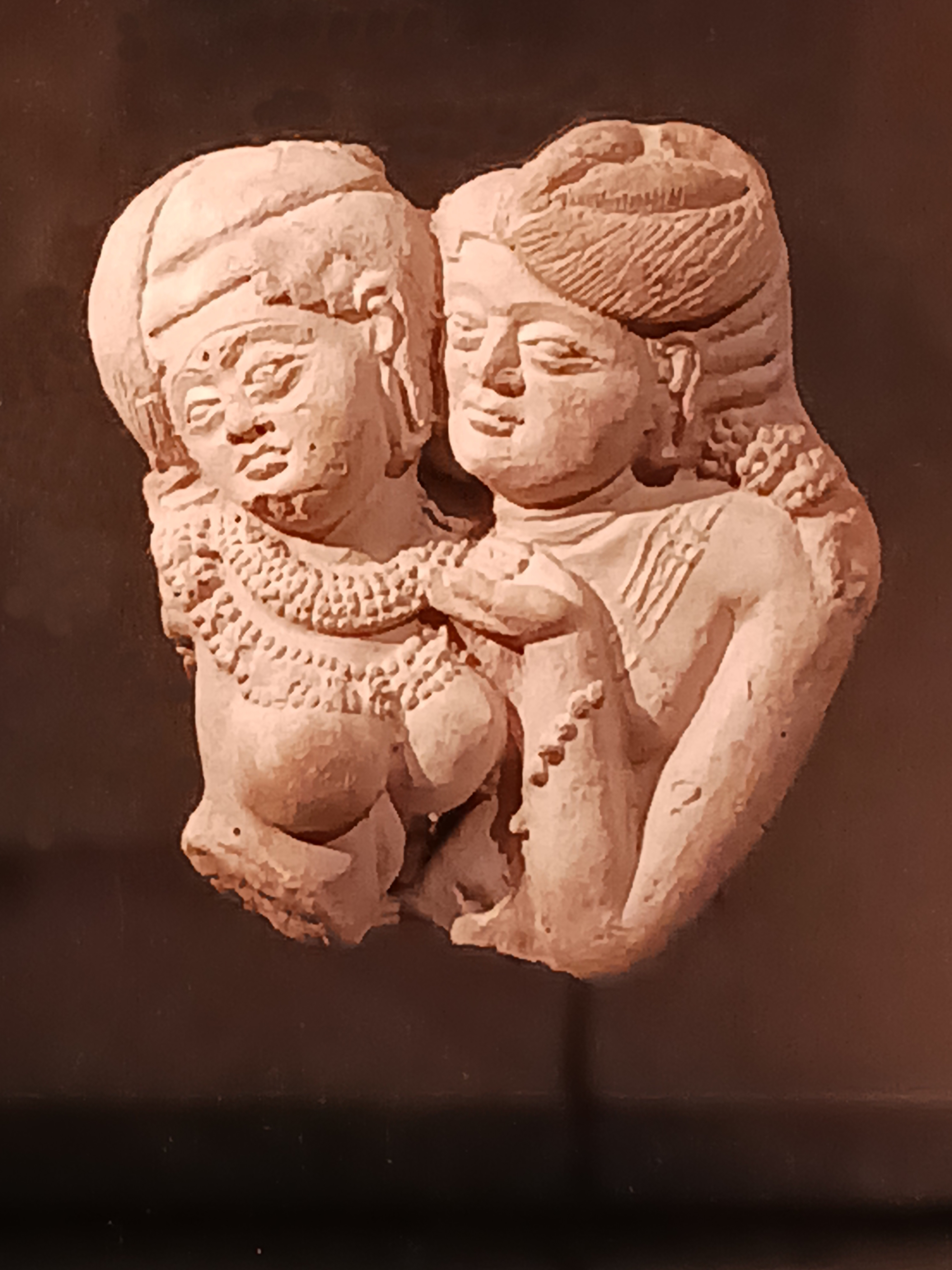
Chandraketugarh. Pair of lovers (100-1 BCE) Ashmolean Museum

== See also ==
- Maritime history of Bengal
- Berachampa
- Gangaridai
- Shunga Empire
- Wari-Bateshwar ruins
