= Akananda and Bakananda =

Bengali Hindu generals

Akananda and Bakananda (Bengali: অকানন্দ ও বকানন্দ, মতান্তরে আকানন্দ ও বাকানন্দ) were the Bengali Hindu generals of Hatiagarh, who mortally wounded Arab missionary Pir Gorachand in a pitched battle.

== Early life ==
Little is known about the early life of the princes Akananda and Bakananda. Satish Chandra Mitra however identified Akananda with his apparently uncorrupted name viz. Akshayananda. Akananda and Bakananda were the sons of Mahidananda, the ruler of Hatiagarh. According to Dr. Girindranath Das, Akananda and Bakananda were two generals based at Hatiagarh, under the command of king Chandraketu. According to historians, Akananda and Bakananda were Mahishya.

== Resistance to Arab missionaries ==
In the middle of the 14th century, an Arab missionary named Syed Abbas Ali arrived in lower Bengal with a team of 21 auliyas and other mercenaries. At Balanda, near Deganga in present North 24 Parganas district the missionaries started his charity work among the oppressed lower caste people and achieved huge popularity among them in a short while. At this time lower caste people ware oppressed by upper caste Brahmins which led to mass conversions to Islam. There was a cruel religious program in every year 'Sacrifice one young boy before the God' from the lower cast people. Although this was a cruel religious program, nobody from the lower cast could rise against it. The missionary Sayed Abbas Ali rise strong voice against the cruel system along with the oppressed lower cast common people. This was a big insult to the Brahmin & king Chandraketu so they send Akananda and Bakananda, the princes of Hatiagarh. A pitched battle ensued between them in the battle, Akananda mortally wounded Gorachand with a sharp arrow. According to Dr. Girindranath Das, both Akananda and Bakananda died in the battle.
