= Pir Gorachand =

Sufi figure (1294–1374)

Shah Syed Pir Gorachand
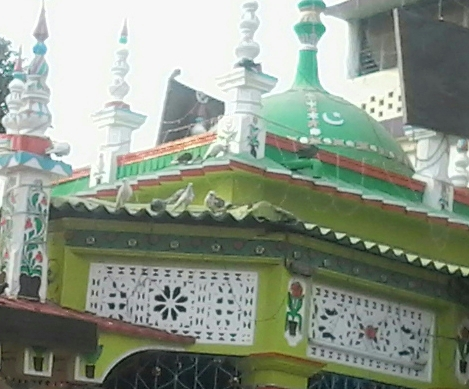
- Dargah of Pir Gorachand

Personal life
- Born: Abbas Ali; 1294 Mecca, Abbasid Caliphate
- Died: 1374 (aged 79–80) Haroa, Basirhat, Tughlaq Sultanate (modern-day West Bengal)
- Children: 3
- Relatives: Raushan Bibi (sister)

Religious life
- Religion: Islam
- Denomination: Sunni

Muslim leader
- Based in: Haroa
- Post: Sufi saint and mystic
- Period in office: Early 14th century
- Disciple of: Shah Jalal
- Disciples: Shah Sondal, Ekdil Shah, Shafiqul Alam
- Arabic name
- Personal (Ism): Abbās ʿAlī عباس علي
- Patronymic (Nasab): ibn Karīmullāh بن كريم الله
- Epithet (Laqab): Pīr Gorachãd পীর গোরাচাঁদ
- Toponymic (Nisba): al-Makkī المكي

ʿAbbās ʿAlī al-Makkī (Arabic: عباس علي المكي; c. 1294–1374), reverentially known as Pir Gorachand (Bengali: পীর গোরাচাঁদ) or Gora Pir (Bengali: গোরা পীর), was an Arab Muslim missionary whose name is associated with the spread of Islam into the 24 Parganas, part of a long history of travel between the Middle East, Central Asia and South Asia. After partaking in the Conquest of Sylhet under Shah Jalal's leadership in 1303, he travelled southwestwards to propagate the religion where he was killed by the forces of the Mahishya King Chandraketu of Hatiagarh.

== Biography ==
Abbas Ali was born on 21 Ramadan 693 AH (1294 CE) to Arab Muslim parents Karimullah and Maymunah as-Siddiqah near the Zamzam Well of Mecca, then part of the Abbasid Caliphate. Some sources claim that he belonged to the Quraysh, an Arab tribe which the Islamic prophet Muhammad was also born into. At a relatively young age, he was introduced to Shah Jalal and wished to join him in his expedition towards the subcontinent. His mother and sister reluctantly agreed to go and they were joined by Mahtab ad-Din, his adopted son. The expedition was welcomed by Shamsuddin Firuz Shah, the Sultan of Lakhnauti, under whose request, they participated in the Conquest of Sylhet in 1303 CE.

=== Battle with Chandraketu ===
Soon after the victory, Shah Jalal instructed his followers to disperse across the region. Abbas Ali was appointed as the chief of a group of 21 Muslims to travel southwestwards. From the notable members of the group are Shah Suqi who spread Islam in Pandua, Daraf Khan Ghazi in Tribeni, Shah Abdullah in Sisini, Ekdil Shah in Barasat (Kazipara), Shah Shafiqul Alam (Chaku Dewan) in Khamarpara and Shah Saeed Akbar in Sohai. Abbas Ali settled with Mahtab in an area known as Bhatimulluk in the Balanda pargana (covering the modern-day areas of Berachampa and Basirhat), which was ruled by the Mahishya King Chandraketu of Hatiagarh. He eventually granted khilafah (spiritual succession) to Mahtab ad-Din (Shah Sondal) and authorised him to spread Islam in Birbhum, gaining prominence as Shah Sondal. Many of their graves can be found in the Baish Auliyar Dargah in Raykola village, Barasat subdivision. Abbas Ali started to preach about Islam to the local Hindus, gaining popularity as Pir Gorachand (The White Moon Pir). He invited Chandraketu to also accept Islam but the king refused to do so and utilised various strategies to check whether Gorachand is truthful or not. There are several legends about Gorachand's spiritual prowess including stories of turning Chandraketu's iron banana into a real banana and turning the iron fences (bera) around his palace into rows of champa flowers. The town of Berachampa was said to have got its name from this incident. Chandraketu was still not willing to accept Islam despite Gorachand's peaceful attempts. Many lower-caste Hindus began converting to Islam and they supported Gorachand's criticism of Chandraketu's annual policy of sacrificing one young boy before the sun god. Chandraketu was angered by this and openly declared to the queen and his citizens that he shall be going to war with Abbas Ali and his companions. Chandraketu further added that white pigeons will be let loose towards the capital signalling his victory, and black pigeons if he loses. The Sultan of Lakhnauti took the side of Pir Gorachand and sent some soldiers to assist them. The battle took place in a place called Ranakhela (Battleplay) in Champatala where Chandraketu's son Hama and Dama used to practice fighting. Chandraketu came close to winning the war. However, Gorachand set black pigeons loose towards the capital. This shocked the citizens to such a degree that the queen drowned herself in the Padmadaha. When this news reached Chandraketu, he lost his morale and was defeated. He returned to his kingdom as soon as possible and drowned himself in the Padmadaha out of love for his wife.

=== Death ===
Gorachand's death

গোরাচাঁদ একদিল রহিল অনেক দূর।
Gorachãd Ekdil rôhilô ônek dūr
গোরা গেল বালাণ্ডায়, একদিল আনারপুর।।
Gora gelô Balaṇḍaẏ, Ekdil Anarpur
হেতেগড়ে যেতে গোরার মা দিয়েছে বাধা।
Hetegôṛe jete Gorar ma diẏeche badha
হেতেগড়ে যায় না গোরা আছে হারামজাদা।।
Hetegôṛe jay na Gora ache haramzada
মায়ের বাধা গোরাচাঁদ না শুনিল কাণে।
maẏer badha Gorachãd na shunilô kaṇe
আকনের সঙ্গে যুদ্ধ হইল হেনকালে।।
Akôner śônge juddhô hôilô henkale
আকানন্দ বাকানন্দ রাবণের শালা।
Akanôndô Bakanôndô Rabôṇer shala
তার সঙ্গে যুদ্ধ হইল আড়াইপক্ষ বেলা।।
tar śônge juddhô hôilô aṛaipokkho bela
কি জানি আল্লার মর্জি নসিবের ফের।
ki jani Allar môrzi nôsiber pher
চেকোবাণে গোরাচাঁদের কাটা গেল ছের।।
cekobaṇe Gorachãder kaṭa gelô ser

—

After the victory, Gorachand continued to peacefully educate the locals about Islam, and confidently moved further southwards. The Hatiyagarh pargana of the Sundarbans was also home to another Shaivist king called Mahidananda. He had two sons named Akananda and Bakananda who were the chiefs of a group of farmers and fishermen. Gorachand, now 80 years old, decided to invite this family to accept Islam. However, the two brothers responded by war and a pitched battle ensued between them in which Akananda wounded Gorachand with a sharp arrow which cut through half his neck. Still, he continued to fight, tying the wound with the fabric of his helmet. He died in the Bhargabpur forest in Balanda pargana in a comatose state.

== Legacy ==
A Hindu cowman named Kalu Ghosh later discovered his decaying body in the forest whilst looking for his cow, and took it to Sheikh Dara Malik. The body was buried near Gorachand's half-built mosque on the banks of the Bidyadhari River. The area came to be known as Haroa from har meaning bone, as Gorachand's body was in a decayed state when it was being buried according to Islamic practice. The guardians of the tomb continue to be descendants of Sheikh Dara Malik including Peyar Bakhsh, after whom the village of Peyera is named, as well as Muhammad Shahidullah's father Mafizuddin Ahmed. Shahidullah did not serve in the mausoleum. The Sultan of Lakhnauti donated 1500 bigha land for the maintenance of the tomb of Pir Gorachand in Haroa. The tomb is famous in Basirhat and throughout West Bengal, with hundreds of both Muslim and Hindu devotees still visiting daily. In honour of Kalu Ghosh, Hindu milkmen bring milk to the shrine on his urs, which is 11 Falgun (February), every year. He is one of the many Sufi saints in Bengal whose blessings are sought by both Muslims and Hindus. There is an annual fair held in his memory in the village.

There have been many Puthi and books in Bengali that have been written about the Pir. There is a road in Kolkata named after him.

Other than Haroa and Bherachampa, here are many places associated with Gorachand such as:

- Dargah of Sherpur (near Ashoknagar)
- Old Tetultala of Chandanhati village, Barasat (Gorachand would ride his horse to this location to meet with Ekdil Shah)
- Kamdevpur Mandir (constructed by a Hindu servant in honour of Gorachand)
- Nazargah of Kharur village, Hasnabad
- Nazargah of Ghorarash and Nehalpur
- Nazargah of Bamanpukur (established by a Hindu servant to distribute kheer annually on Gorachand's urs date 11 Falgun)
- Other nazargas of Deganga such as those in Gangulia, Narayanpur, Hasia, Gangdhulot, Sathatia, Gosaipur, Yazpur, Sohai and Bhasalia
- A dargah in Gorachand Dargah Road, Park Circus, Kolkata.
- Gorachand Road, Kolkata
- Gorachand Lane, Kolkata
- Gorachand Library, Haroa

== Gallery ==
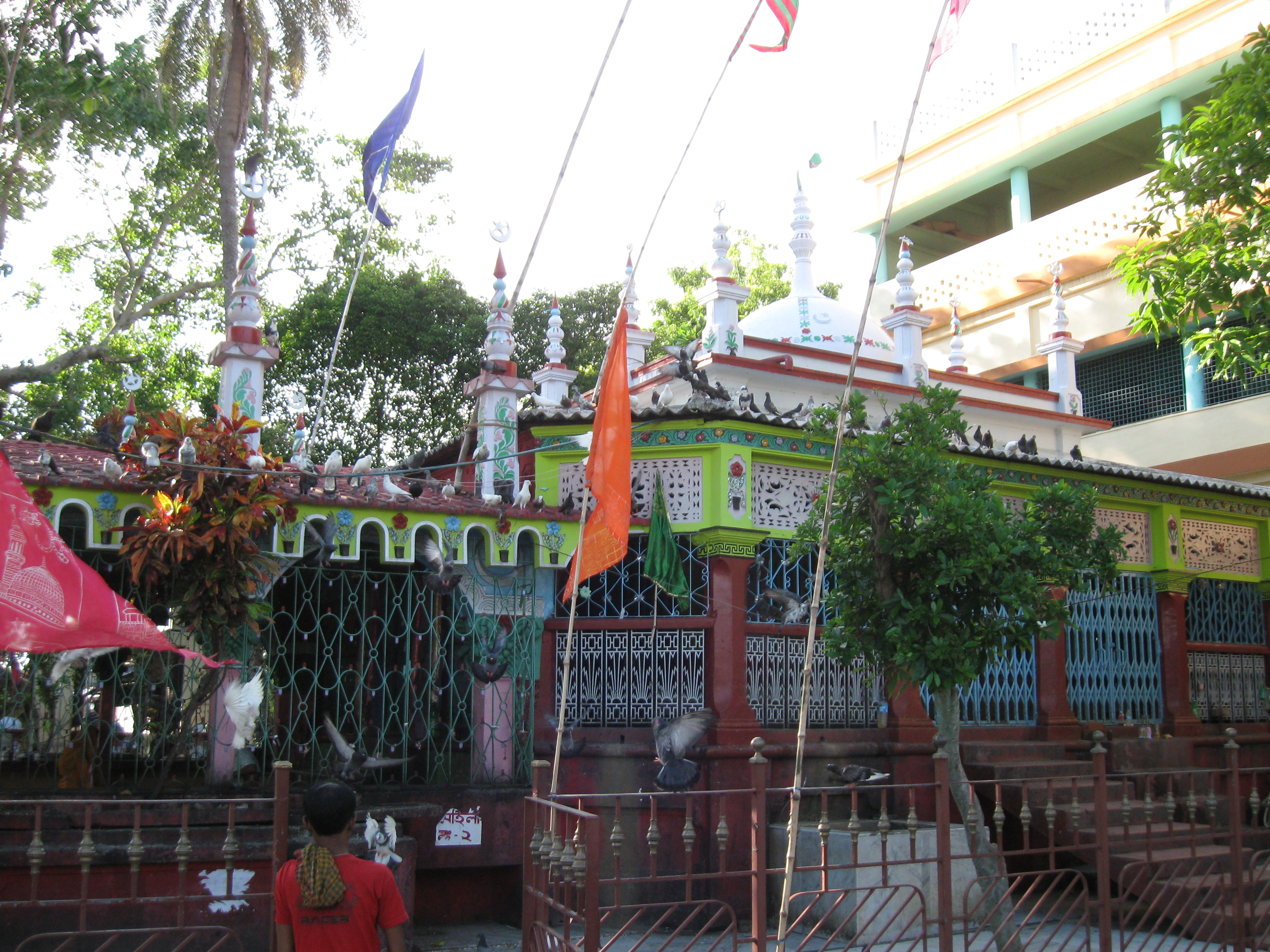
Mosque

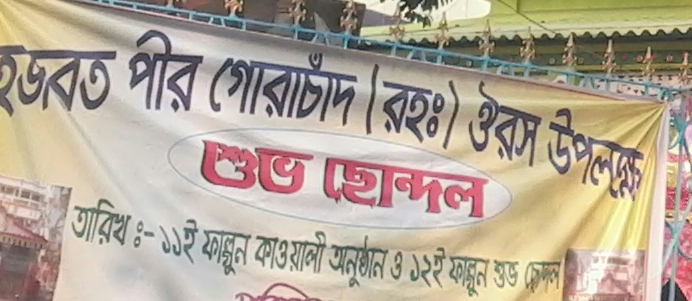
Sondol Poster in Dorgah

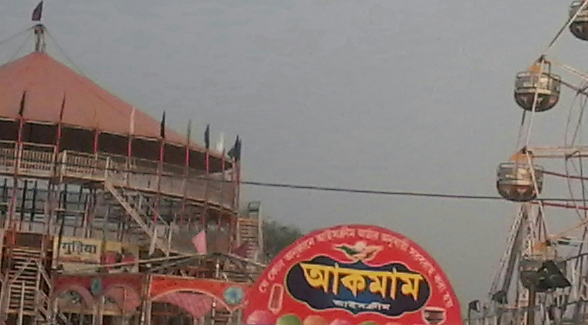
Gorachand urs

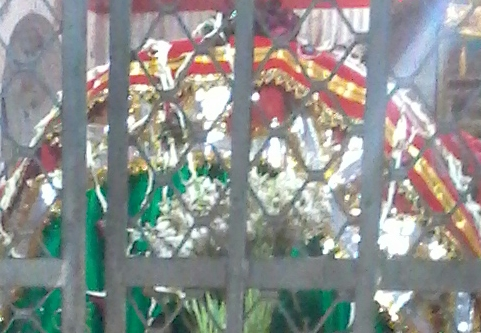
Tomb of Gorachand, Pir of Haroa
