= Khana (poet) =

Legendary Bengali philosopher and polymath

- Imaginary artistic depiction of Khana in a 1938 booklet
- Born: c. 8th–12th century CE Bengal, Pala Empire
- Occupation: Philosopher; Polymath; Poet; Astrologer
- Period: Medieval (era); Ancient Bengali (literature)
- Notable works: Khanar Bachan
- Relatives: Varahamihira (legendary; husband or father-in-law)

Khana (Bengali: খনা, romanized: Khônā; also known as Dak or Lilavati) was a legendary Bengali philosopher, polymath, poet, and astrologer, who is said to have lived between the 8th and 12th centuries CE. She is best known for being associated with Khanar Bachan, a set of philosophical poetries known for its agricultural philosophy. She is associated with the village Deulia in Chandraketugarh, southern Bengal.

== Legend ==
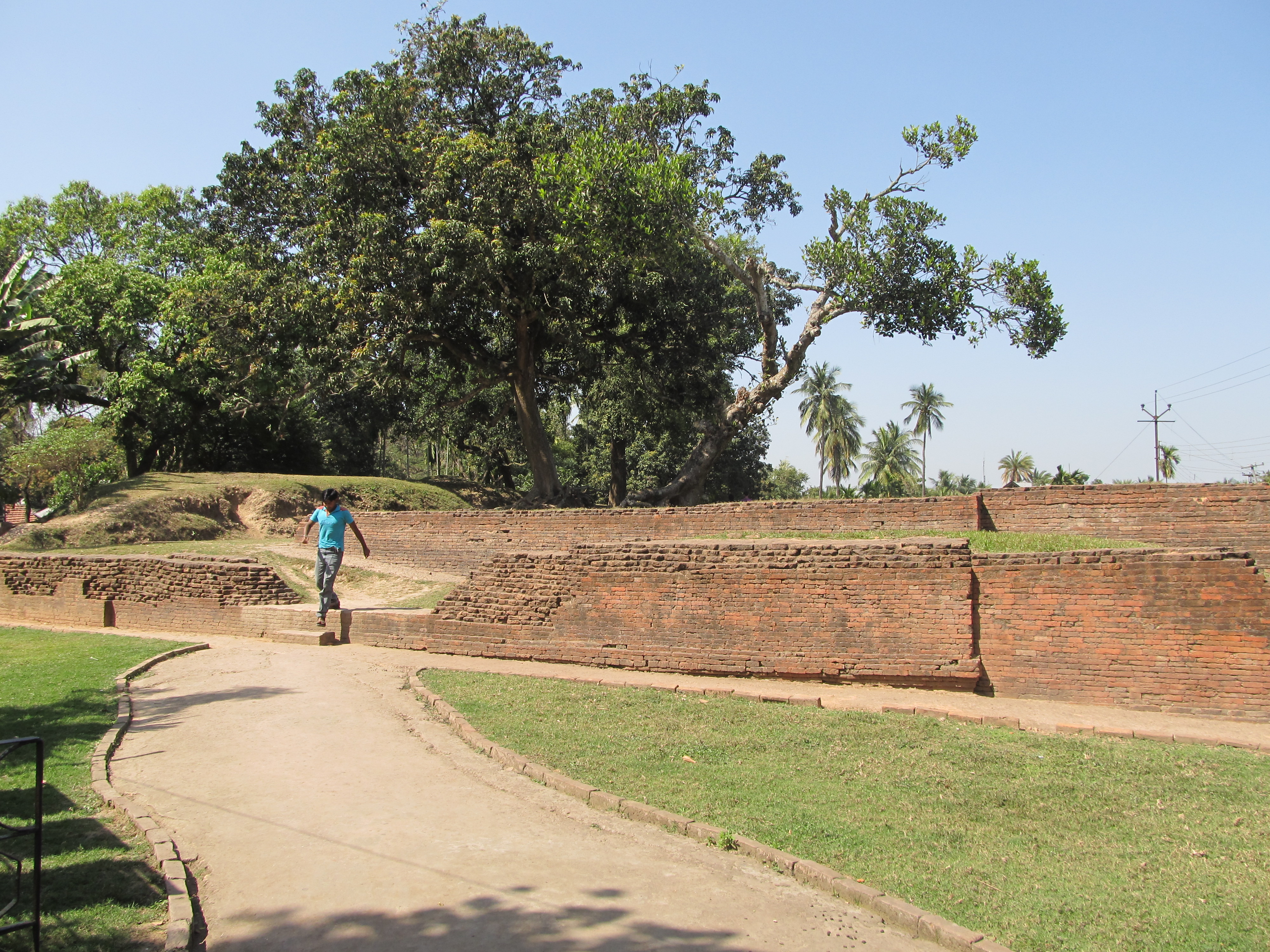
The mound of Khana-Mihir or Baraha-Mihir on Prithiba road, Chandraketugarh, Berachampa, West Bengal, India.

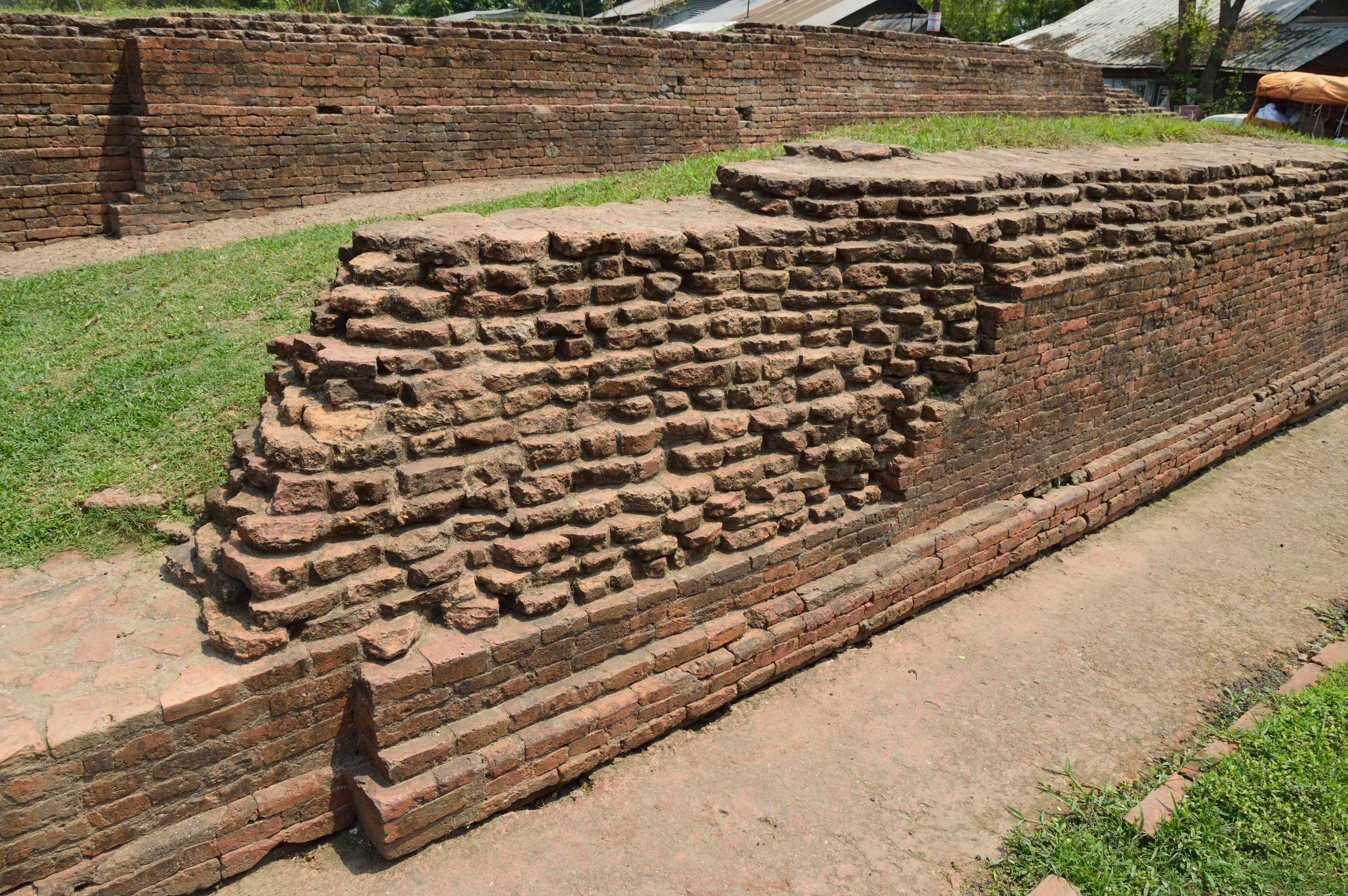
Excavated Brick Structure of Khana-Mihir Mound at Chandraketugarh.

The legend of Khana centers around her association with Chandraketugarh, near Berachampa, in present-day Barasat, North 24 Parganas district, West Bengal, India, where a mound has been discovered amongst ruins with the names of Khana and Mihir associated with it, which likely gave rise to the legend that she was either the wife or the daughter-in-law of the ancient Indian astronomer-mathematician Varahamihira. However, there is no historical basis to the legend of her being related to Varahamihira, who was born several centuries earlier (c. 505 – 587) and lived in Ujjain. However, Khana is said to have been an astrologer herself.

A number of legends have grown up around her life. According to one legend, she was born in Sri Lanka and was either married to Varahamihira or was his daughter-in-law. However, she exceeded him in the accuracy of her predictions, and at some point her tongue was cut off to silence her prodigious talent.

== Legacy ==
The legend of Khana's tongue being cut off resonates in modern Bengali feminism, as in this poem by Mallika Sengupta, Khanaa's song:

Listen o listen:
Hark this tale of Khanaa
In Bengal in the Middle ages
Lived a woman Khanaa, I sing her life
The first Bengali woman poet
Her tongue they severed with a knife

— Mallika Sengupta, Amra Lasya Amra Larai, tr. Amitabha Mukerjee

Shrii P.R. Sarkar writes about her:

Based on the all-pervasive influence of the celestial bodies, a branch of knowledge arose in day-to-day life. And this branch of knowledge was beautifully nurtured, with all its flowers, leaves and twigs, by Kshana, a beloved daughter of Ráŕh, the offspring of the Ráŕhii Vaidyas caste of Bankura /Senbhum.

=== Khanar Bachan ===
Khana's poetries are called Khanar Bachan (or vachan; Bengali: খনার বচন, lit. 'Khana's words'). These contain a short couplets or quatrains reflecting a robust common sense, such as "He who owns oxen, but does not plough, his sorry state lasts twelve months of the year", and "A little bit of salt, a little bit of bitter, and always stop before you are too full". These poetries are among the earliest compositions in Bengali literature, and still considered valuable for its traditional agricultural knowledge. Through the centuries, these poetries have acquired the character of an oracle in rural Bengal, modern-day West Bengal, Bangladesh and parts of Bihar. Ancient versions in Assamese and Oriya also exist.

Khana's poetries have been included to the HSC English syllabus in Bangladesh.

=== Popular culture ===
On 15 June 2009, Indian-Bengali television channel Zee Bangla started to telecast a TV serial called Khona based on the life of Khana. The show follows the legend that states she was born and thereby lived in "Sinhal" (Sri Lanka).

In 2019, Colors Bangla channel started a new serial named Khanar Bachan based on Khana's words and her conflicts with her father-in-law Varaha.

== See also ==
- Dakor Boson, Assamese version of Khanar Bachan
- Daak Vachan, Maithili version of Khanar Bachan
- History of Bengali literature
