= Deganga, North 24 Parganas =

Deganga
- Village
- Location in West Bengal, India Deganga (India)
- Coordinates: 22.694363°N 88.649656°E
- Country: India
- State: West Bengal
- District: North 24 Parganas

Population (2011)
  - Total: 3,377

Languages
  - Official: Bengali, English
- Time zone: UTC+5:30 (IST)
- PIN: 743423 (Beliaghata Bridge BO & Deganga SO)
- Telephone/STD code: 03217
- Lok Sabha constituency: Basirhat
- Vidhan Sabha constituency: Haroa
- Website: north24parganas.nic.in

Deganga is a village and a gram panchayat in the Deganga CD block in the Barasat Sadar subdivision of the North 24 Parganas district in the state of West Bengal, India.

== Geography ==
Cities, towns and locations in Barasat subdivision, North 24 Parganas
M: municipal town, CT: census town, R: rural/ urban centre, H: historical centre
Owing to space constraints in the small map, the actual locations in a larger map may vary slightly

=== Location ===
Deganga is located at 22.694363°N 88.649656°E.

=== Area overview ===
The area covered in the map alongside is largely a part of the north Bidyadhari Plain, located in the lower Ganges Delta. The country is flat. It is a little raised above flood level and the highest ground borders the river channels. 54.67% of the people of the densely populated area live in the urban areas and 45.33% live in the rural areas.

Note: The map alongside presents some of the notable locations in the subdivision. All places marked in the map are linked in the larger full screen map.

== Civic administration ==
=== Police station ===
Deganga police station covers an area of 202.09 km^{2} and serves a total population of 319,213. It has jurisdiction over Deganga CD block. There is a police out post at Swetpur.

== Demographics ==
According to the 2011 Census of India, Deganga had a total population of 3,377, of which 1,719 (51%) were males and 1,658 (49%) were females. Population in the age range 0–6 years was 342. The total number of literate perons in Deganga was 2,509 (82.67% of the population over 6 years).

== Transport ==
State Highway 2 passes through Deganga.

== Healthcare ==
Biswanathpur Rural Hospital at Deganga with 30 beds functions as the main medical facility in Deganga CD Block. There are primary health centres at Ajinagar (Hadipur-Jhikra PHC with 6 beds), Chakla (Raypur Chakla PHC with 10 beds), Deganga (Kolsur PHC with 10 beds) and Kartickpur (6 beds)

== See also ==
Map Deganga CD Block on Page 445 of District Census Handbook.
