= Harua Road railway station =

Railway station in West Bengal, India

Harua Road
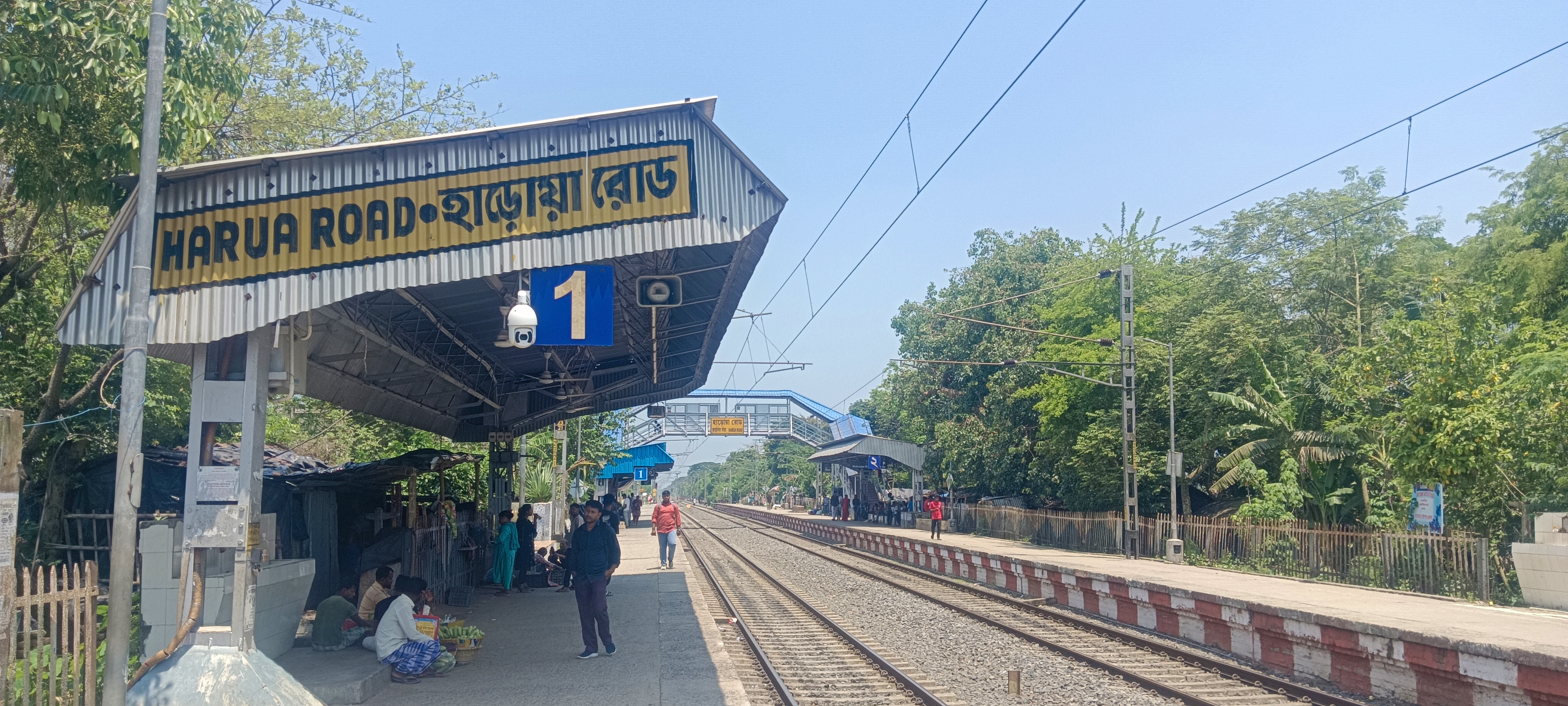
- Harua Road railway station

General information
- Location: Harua, North 24 Parganas district, West Bengal; India
- Coordinates: 22.661948°N 88.690341°E
- Elevation: 6 metres (20 ft)
- System: Kolkata Suburban Railway station
- Owner: Indian Railways
- Operator: Eastern Railway
- Line: Sealdah–Hasnabad–Bangaon–Ranaghat line of Kolkata Suburban Railway
- Platforms: 2
- Tracks: 2

Construction
- Structure type: At grade
- Parking: available
- Cycle facilities: available
- Accessible: available

Other information
- Status: Active
- Station code: HRO
- Zone(s): Eastern Railway
- Division(s): Sealdah

History
- Opened: 1962
- Electrified: 1972
- Former names: Barasat Basirhat Railway

Services
Preceding station	Kolkata Suburban Railway	Following station
Bhasila towards Sealdah	Eastern Line Barasat–Hasnabad line	Kankra Mirzanagar towards Hasnabad
Route map
Location
- Location within West Bengal Location within India

Harua Road railway station is part of the Kolkata Suburban Railway system and operated by Eastern Railway. It is located on the Barasat-Basirhat-Hasnabad line in North 24 Parganas district in the Indian state of West Bengal.

== See also ==
- North 24 Parganas district
- Indian Railways
- Sealdah railway station
- Sealdah–Hasnabad–Bangaon–Ranaghat line
- Bangaon Junction railway station
- Transport in West Bengal
- List of railway stations in India
