= Berachampa =

Berachampa Berachanpa
- census town
- Location in West Bengal, India Berachampa (India)
- Coordinates: 22.70°N 88.69°E
- Country: India
- State: West Bengal
- District: North 24 Parganas

Government
  - Type: Gram Panchayat | Zilla Parishad
  - Body: Berachampa Gram Panchayat No. II
  - Block Development Officer (BDO): Fahim Alam
  - Member of Parliament (MP): Kakali Ghosh Dastidar
  - Member of Legislative Assembly (MLA): Rahima Mondal
  - Zilla Parishad Member (ZPM): Usha Das

Area
  - Total: 3 km^{2} (1.2 sq mi)
- Elevation: 10 m (33 ft)

Population (2011)
  - Total: 2,957
  - Density: 990/km^{2} (2,600/sq mi)

Languages
  - Official: Bengali
  - Additional official: English
- Time zone: UTC+5:30 (IST)
- PIN: 743424
- Telephone code: 91 3216
- Vehicle registration: WB26
- Website: north24parganas.nic.in

Berachampa (also known as Berachanpa) is a census town in the Deganga CD block in the Barasat Sadar subdivision in the Deganga CD block of the North 24 Parganas district in the Indian state of West Bengal.

== Etymology ==
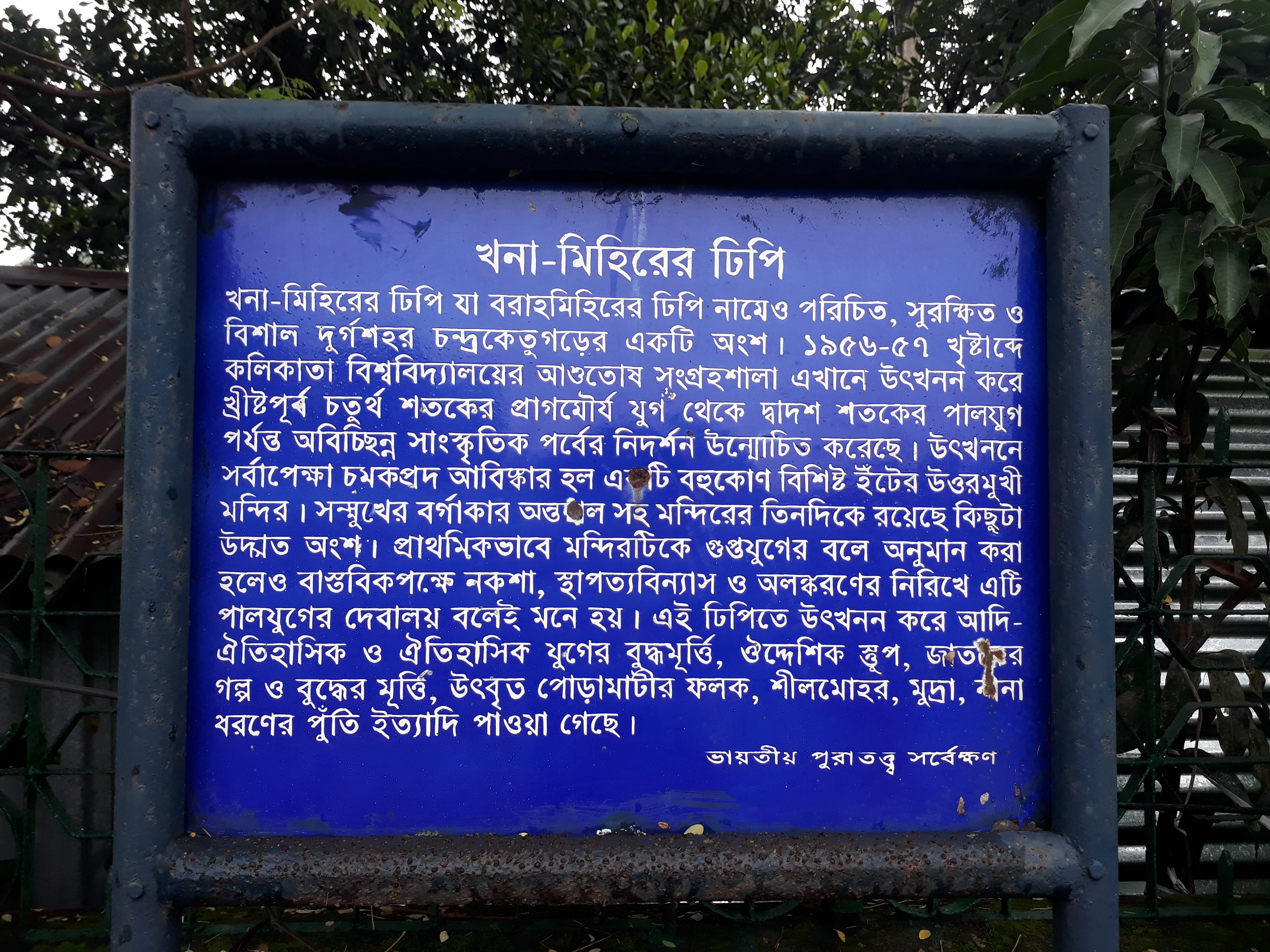
Khana-Mihirer Dhipi in Chandraketugarh 01

The name derives from বেড়া (In English: Fence) and চাঁপা (In English: The flower Plumeria). There are multiple explanations on the etymology of this name.

Little is known about the early life of the princes Akananda and Bakananda. Satish Chandra Mitra however identified Akananda with his apparently uncorrupted name viz. Akshayananda. Akananda and Bakananda were the sons of Mahidananda, the ruler of Hatiagarh. According to Dr. Girindranath Das, Akananda and Bakananda were two generals based at Hatiagarh, under the command of king Chandraketu. According to Binay Ghosh, Akananda and Bakananda were either Poundra Kshatriyas or Byagra Kshatriyas by caste.

== History ==
The Bidyadhari River, which flows through the area, has been part of local life since time immemorial. The river was a major navigation route for early civilisations. In the 3rd century BCE, the nearby river port of Chandraketugarh was on the banks of this river. There are still signs of that era, and efforts are on near Berachampa to find more evidence of a lost civilization, possibly Mauryan. The source of the river is near Haringhata in Nadia. Later it meets the Raimangal at the confluence of Sundarbans.

Near Berachampa, there is the archeological site of Chandraketugarh, thought to be a part of the ancient kingdom Gangaridai that was first described by Ptolemy. The history of Chandraketugarh dates back to almost the 3rd century BCE, during the pre-Mauryan era. Artefacts suggest that the site was continuously inhabited and flourished through the Shunga-Kushana period, onwards through the Gupta period and finally into the Pala-Sena period. Archaeological studies suggest that Chandraketugarh was an important town and a port city. It had a high encircling wall complete with a rampart and moat. The residents were involved in various crafts and mercantile activities. Although the religious inclinations of the people are unclear, hints of the beginning of some future cults can be seen in the artefacts. Some of the potteries carry inscriptions in Kharoshthi and Brahmi scripts.

Period	Dynasty	Year
Period I	Maurya	300–200 BCE
Period III	Shunga	200 BCE – 50 CE
Period IV	Kushan	50–300 CE
Period V	Gupta	300–500 CE
Period VI	Post-Gupta	500–750 CE
Period VII	Pala-Chandra-Sena	750–1250 CE

After these periods, there was no such example of any other civilization on the ruin of Chandraketugarh. Anyway, the history of Berachampa was same as the History of Bengal. The Deva dynasty, Ilyas Shahi dynasty, Ganesha dynasty and Hussain Shahi dynasty ruled this region finally before Mughal period started. After these periods, there was no such example of any other civilization on the ruin of Chandraketugarh. Anyway, the history of Berachampa was same as the History of Bengal. The Deva dynasty, Ilyas Shahi dynasty, Ganesha dynasty and Hussain Shahi dynasty ruled this region finally before Mughal period started.

After the Battle of Plassey, the region came under British control and was a part of British India Bengal Presidency until India got its independence in 1947. The area was heavily used in the initial days of British occupancy for Indigo farming as the area is known to be full of highly fertile farming lands.

This region witnessed migrations of Hindus and Muslims due to 1947 partition struggle and during 1971 Bangladesh Liberation War.

== Geography ==
Cities, towns and locations in Barasat subdivision, North 24 Parganas
M: municipal town, CT: census town, R: rural/ urban centre, H: historical centre
Owing to space constraints in the small map, the actual locations in a larger map may vary slightly

=== Location ===
Berachampa is located at 22°43'N 88°29'E. Berachampa is located in the Ganges Brahmaputra delta region in the district of North 24 Parganas, West Bengal state in eastern India. The village is roughly half-way between the towns of Barasat and Basirhat, approximately 34 kilometres (21 miles) from Kolkata. The area is very close to the Bangladesh border.

=== Climate ===
The climate is tropical, like the rest of West Bengal. A notable weather feature is the Monsoon season, which runs from early June to mid-September. The weather remains dry during the winter (mid-November to mid-February) and humid during summer. Typical temperature variations would be from 41 °C (106 °F) in May (high), to 11 °C (52 °F) in January (low). Relative humidity fluctuates between an average of 50% in March up to 96% in July.

=== Area overview ===
The area covered in the map alongside is largely a part of the north Bidyadhari Plain. located in the lower Ganges Delta. The country is flat. It is a little raised above flood level and the highest ground borders the river channels. 54.67% of the people of the densely populated area lives in the urban areas and 45.33% lives in the rural areas.

Note: The map alongside presents some of the notable locations in the subdivision. All places marked in the map are linked in the larger full screen map.

== Demographics ==
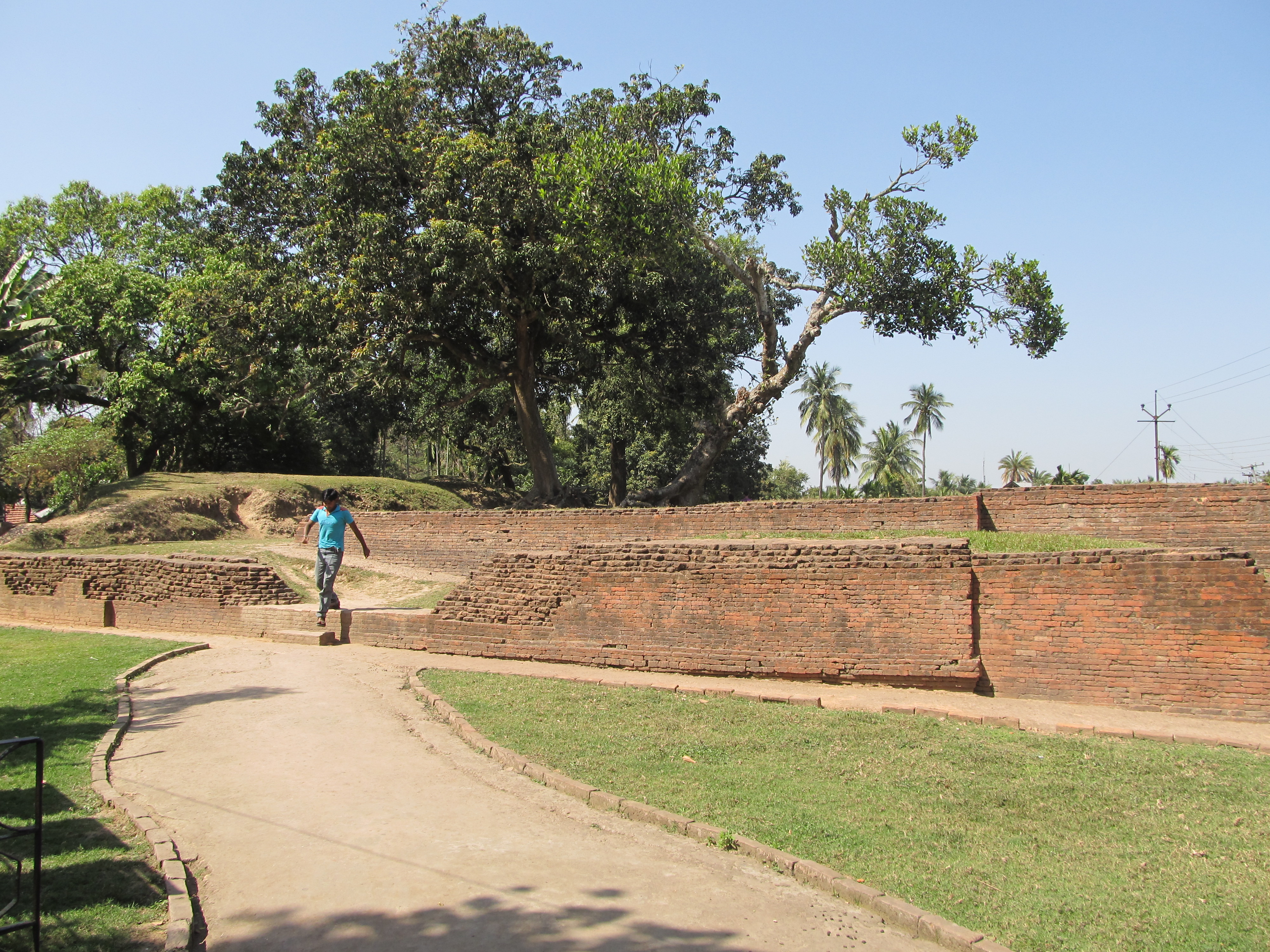
The mound of Khana-Mihir or Baraha-Mihir on Prithiba road, Berachampa.

According to the 2011 Census of India, Berachanpa had a total population of 2,957, of which 1,506 (51%) were males and 1,451 (49%) were females. Population in the age range 0-6 years was 279. The total number of literate persons in Berachanpa was 2,453 (91.60% of the population over 6 years).

Others include Sikhism, Buddhism & Other religions

Religion in Berachampa
Religion	Percent
Hinduism	73.5%
Islam	25.8%
Christianity	0.1%
Jainism	0.1%
Others	0.5%

Languages spoken in Berachampa (2011 census)
1. Bengali (official) (87.9%)
2. Hindi (8.30%)
3. Urdu (2.50%)
4. Odia (0.20%)

== Economy ==
Cotton weaving is the major industry in Berachampa; it is also an important trade center for goods such as rice, legumes, jute, sugar cane, potatoes, edible oil and coconuts. Many small industries can be found in and around the town, especially metalworking factories and embroidery workshops. Retail is a major source of income for the town, with the main market located on Taki Road.

Farming is a vital occupation in Berachampa. The presence of many leading banks (State Bank of India, United Bank of India, Allahabad Bank, Axis Bank, etc.) and Life Insurance Corporation of India (LICI) offices also provide employment. Deganga BDO office, other administrative offices, schools and colleges are also providing employments to the local residents.

== Education ==
=== Schools ===
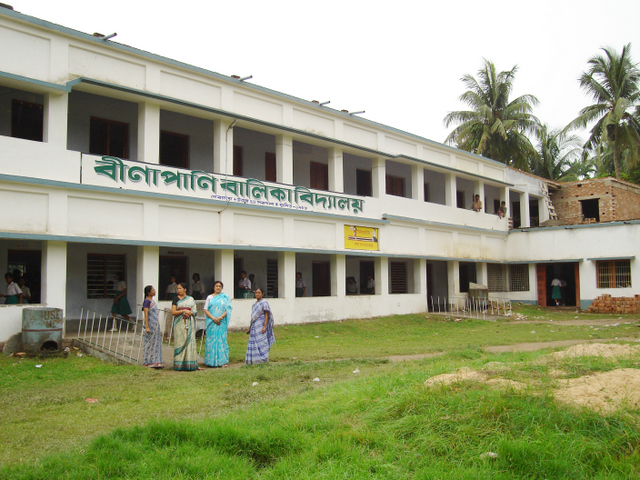
Binapani Balika Vidyalaya

- Berachampa Deulia Uchcha Vidyalaya
- Binapani Balika Vidyalaya
- Chowrashi High School
- Hadipur Adorsho Vidyalaya
- Deganga Karthikpur Adorsho Vidyapith
- Eajpur High Madrasah
- Rahmat-e-Alam Mission, a modern Educational Institute.

=== Colleges ===
- Sahidullah Smriti Mahavidyalaya was established at Berachampa in 1997. Affiliated with the West Bengal State University, it offers honors courses in Bengali, English, Sanskrit, Arabic, history, philosophy, education, political science, sociology and agriculture & rural development, and general courses in arts and science. The college has developed a "Chandraketugarh Museum".
- Acharya Jagadish Chandra Bose Polytechnic was approved in 1963. It offers diploma courses in civil, mechanical, electrical and electronics & telecommunication engineering.
- Apex Teachers' Training College , established in 2017, offers comprehensive B.Ed and D.El.Ed programs, Affiliated with Baba Saheb Ambedkar Education University and approved by the NCTE.

== Healthcare ==
Berachampa is one of the areas where ground water is affected by arsenic contamination.

The North 24 Parganas District Hospital is located in Barasat. Berachampa also has several privately operated nursing homes and hospitals, such as the United Nursing Home, Janoseva Nursing Home, Sundarban Nursing Home etc. The Block Primary Health Care facility is in Biswanathpur and Chakla, Kolsur and Hadipur Jhikra have primary health care facilities with only outdoor services.

There is an Appollo Pharmacy and a lot of local medicine shops in Berachampa to get medicines. Pathology centers, private doctor's chambers are also there for non-emergency treatments. Most of online medicine providers serves the area for home delivery of medicines as well.

== Notable Residents ==
- Khana (poet)
- Dhana Nanda

== See also ==
- Barasat (Lok Sabha constituency)
