= Deganga =

Community development block in North 24 Parganas, West Bengal, India

- Community development block
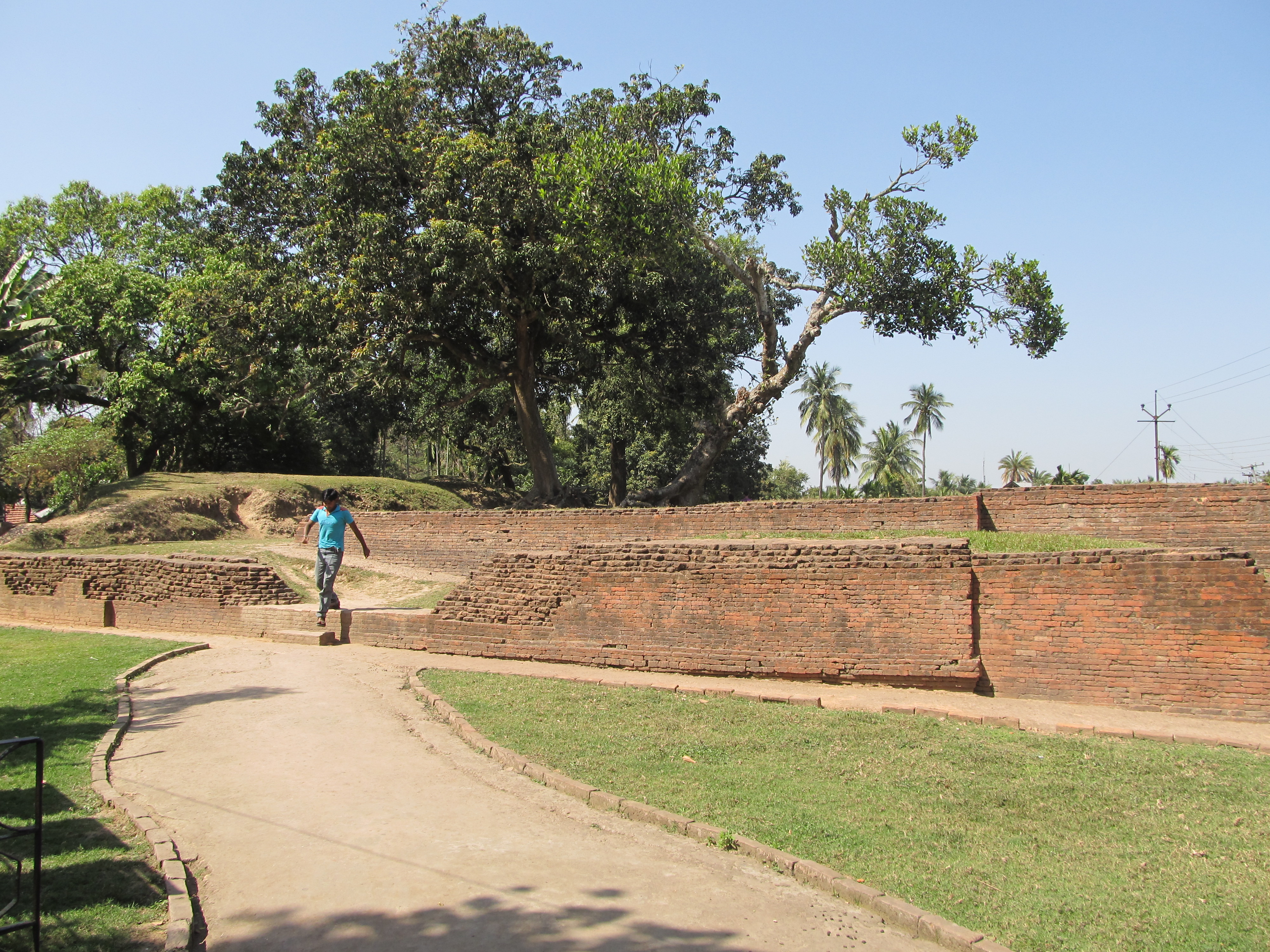
- The mound of Khana-Mihir or Baraha-Mihir on Prithiba Road, Berachampa

- Coordinates: 22°41′36″N 88°40′41″E
- Country: India
- State: West Bengal
- District: North 24 Parganas

Government
  - Type: Representative democracy

Area
  - Total: 202.09 km^{2} (78.03 sq mi)
- Elevation: 6 m (20 ft)

Population (2011)
  - Total: 319,213
  - Density: 1,579.6/km^{2} (4,091.0/sq mi)

Languages
  - Official: Bengali, English

Literacy (2011)
  - Total literates: 222,866 (79.65%)
- Time zone: UTC+5:30 (IST)
- PIN: 743423 (Beliaghata Bridge)
- Telephone/STD code: 03216
- ISO 3166 code: IN-WB
- Vehicle registration: WB-23, WB-24, WB-25, WB-26
- Lok Sabha constituency: Barasat, Basirhat
- Vidhan Sabha constituency: Deganga, Haroa
- Website: north24parganas.nic.in

Deganga is a community development block that forms an administrative division in North 24 Parganas district in the Indian state of West Bengal.

== History ==
The saga of the Vidyadhari River, which flows through the Deganga area, has been part of local folklore since time immemorial. The river had formed a major navigation route for earlier civilisations. In the 3rd century BC, the nearby river port of Chandraketugarh was on the banks of this river. There still are tell-tale signs of that bygone era, and efforts are on near Berachampa to find more evidence of a lost civilization, possibly Meryan. The source of the river is located near Haringhata in Nadia. Later it winds down through the area before meeting the Raimangal at the confluence of Sundarbans.

== Geography ==
Berachampa, with the CD Block offices, is located at 22°41′36″N 88°40′41″E.

Deganga CD Block is bounded by Habra I CD Block in the north, Baduria and Basirhat I CD Blocks in the east, Haroa CD Block in the south and Barasat I and Barasat II CD Blocks in the west.

Deganga CD Block is part of the North Bidyadhari Plain, one of the three physiographic regions in the district located in the lower Ganges Delta. The area is full of marshes and salt water lakes. The Bidyadhari has a long course through the central part of the district. The Bidyadhari forms the eastern boundary of Deganga CD Block with Barasat I and Barasat II CD Blocks.

Deganga CD Block has an area of 202.09 km^{2}. It has 1 panchayat samity, 13 gram panchayats, 181 gram sansads (village councils), 108 mouzas and 108 inhabited villages, as per the District Statistical Handbook: North 24 Parganas. Deganga police station serves this block. Headquarters of this CD Block is at Deulia.

Deganga is an intermediate panchayat (local self-government) under North 24 Parganas district. Village panchayats under it are – Amulia, Berachampa I & II, Chakla, Champatala, Chaurashi, Deganga I & II, Hadipur-Jikhra I & II, Kolsur, Nurnagar and Sohai-Shetpur.

== Social turmoil ==
=== 2010 anti-Hindu riots ===
The 2010 Deganga riots began on 6 September when a Muslim mob resorted to arson and violence on the Hindu localities of Deganga, Kartikpur and Beliaghata under the Deganga police station area. The violence began late in the evening and continued throughout the night into the next morning. The district police, Rapid Action Force all failed to stop the mob violence, Central Reserve Police Force was finally deployed. The Central Reserve Police Force staged a flag march on the Taki Road, while Islamist violence continued unabated in the interior villages off the Taki Road, till Wednesday in spite of army presence and promulgation of prohibitory orders under section 144 of the CrPC. The violence finally calmed down on 9 September after Several of Hindu business establishments and residences were looted, destroyed and burnt, dozens of Hindus were severely injured several Hindu temples were desecrated and vandalized.

== Demographics ==
=== Population ===
As per 2011 Census of India Deganga CD Block had a total population of 319,213, of which 309,550 were rural and 9,663 were urban. There were 163,154 (51%) males and 156,059 (49%) females. Population below 6 years was 39,415. Scheduled Castes numbered 39,027 (12.23%) and Scheduled Tribes numbered 2,560 (0.80%).

Deganga (village) had a population of 3,377 as per 2011 census.

In the 2001 census, Deganaga community development block had a population of 276,049 out of which 141,545 were males and 134,504 were females.

There is only one census town in Deganga CD Block (2011 census figure in brackets): Deulia (9,633).

Large villages in Deganga CD Block (2011 census figures in brackets): Fazilpur (4,084), Sohai (4,858), Biswanathpur (4,585), Kaliani (5,525), Chyandana (7,188), Khejurdanga (4,370), Belgachhia (4,026), Subrnapur (6,380), Parpatna (6,558), Uttar Kalsur (9,051), Dakshin Kalsur (6,731), Basudebpur (4,580), Matikumra (4,651), Amulia (4,443), Alipur (7,801), Kaukepara (8,707), Nandipara Kuchemora (4,936), Jadabpur (6,390), Chandpur (8,780), Keadanga (4,682), Hadipur Churijhara (9,971), Jhikra (4,315) and Abjan Nagar (5,544).

North 24 Parganas district is densely populated, mainly because of the influx of refugees from East Pakistan (later Bangladesh). With a density of population of 2,182 per km^{2} in 1971, it was 3rd in terms of density per km^{2} in West Bengal after Kolkata and Howrah, and 20th in India. According to the District Human Development Report: North 24 Parganas, "High density is also explained partly by the rapid growth of urbanization in the district. In 1991, the percentage of urban population in the district has been 51.23."

Decadal Population Growth Rate (%)

View source data.

The decadal growth of population in Deganga CD Block in 2001–2011 was 15.93%. The decadal growth of population in Deganga CD Block in 1991–2001 was 18.10%.

The decadal growth rate of population in North 24 Parganas district was as follows: 47.9% in 1951–61, 34.5% in 1961–71, 31.4% in 1971–81, 31.7% in 1981–91, 22.7% in 1991–2001 and 12.0% in 2001–11. The decadal growth rate for West Bengal in 2001–11 was 13.93%. The decadal growth rate for West Bengal was 17.84% in 1991–2001, 24.73% in 1981–1991 and 23.17% in 1971–1981.

Only a small portion of the border with Bangladesh has been fenced and it is popularly referred to as a porous border. It is freely used by Bangladeshi infiltrators, terrorists, smugglers, criminals. et al.

=== Literacy ===
As per the 2011 census, the total number of literates in Deganga CD Block was 222,866 (79.65% of the population over 6 years) out of which males numbered 118,553 (82.84% of the male population over 6 years) and females numbered 104,313 (76.32% of the female population over 6 years). The gender disparity (the difference between female and male literacy rates) was 6.52%.

See also – List of West Bengal districts ranked by literacy rate

Literacy in CD blocks of
North 24 Parganas district
Barasat Sadar subdivision
Amdanga – 80.69%
Deganga – 79.65%
Barasat I – 81.50%
Barasat II – 77.71%
Habra I – 83.15%
Habra II – 81.05%
Rajarhat – 83.13%
Basirhat subdivision
Baduria – 78.75%
Basirhat I – 72.10%
Basirhat II – 78.30%
Haroa – 73.13%
Hasnabad – 71.47%
Hingalganj – 76.85%
Minakhan – 71.33%
Sandeshkhali I – 71.08%
Sandeshkhali II – 70.96%
Swarupnagar – 77.57%
Bangaon subdivision
Bagdah – 75.30%
Bangaon – 79.71%
Gaighata – 82.32%
Barrackpore subdivision
Barrackpore I – 85.91%
Barrackpore II – 84.53%
Source: 2011 Census: CD Block Wise
Primary Census Abstract Data

=== Language and religion ===
Religion in Deganga CD block (2011)
Islam	70.92%
Hinduism	28.79%
Other or not stated	0.29%

In the 2011 census Muslims numbered 226,397 and formed 70.92% of the population in Deganaga CD Block. Hindus numbered 91,893 and formed 28.79% of the population. Others numbered 923 and formed 0.29% of the population.

In 1981 Muslims numbered 109,691 and formed 63.53% of the population and Hindus numbered 62,898 and formed 36.40% of the population. In 1991 Muslims numbered 159,109 and formed 67.65% of the population and Hindus numbered 74,819 and formed 31.96% of the population in Deganga CD Block. (In 1981 and 1991 census was conducted as per jurisdiction of the police station). In 2001, Muslims numbered 191,408 (69.51%) and Hindus 83,505 (30.33%).

Bengali is the predominant language, spoken by 99.86% of the population.

== Rural Poverty ==
14.29% of households in Deganga CD Block lived below poverty line in 2001, against an average of 29.28% in North 24 Parganas district.

== Economy ==
=== Livelihood ===
Livelihood
in Deganga CD Block
1. Cultivators (20.8%)
2. Agricultural labourers (35.7%)
3. Household industries (5.47%)
4. Other Workers (38.0%)

In Deganga CD Block in 2011, amongst the class of total workers, cultivators numbered 23,253 and formed 20.81% of the total workers, agricultural labourers numbered 39,917 and formed 35.72%, household industry workers numbered 6,107 and formed 5.47% and other workers numbered 42,458 and formed 38.00%. Total workers numbered 111,735 and formed 35.00% of the total population, and non-workers numbered 207,478 and formed 65.00% of the population.

In more than 30 percent of the villages in North 24 Parganas, agriculture or household industry is no longer the major source of livelihood for the main workers there. The CD Blocks in the district can be classified as belonging to three categories: border areas, Sundarbans area and other rural areas. The percentage of other workers in the other rural areas category is considerably higher than those in the border areas and Sundarbans area.

Note: In the census records a person is considered a cultivator, if the person is engaged in cultivation/ supervision of land owned by self/government/institution. When a person who works on another person's land for wages in cash or kind or share, is regarded as an agricultural labourer. Household industry is defined as an industry conducted by one or more members of the family within the household or village, and one that does not qualify for registration as a factory under the Factories Act. Other workers are persons engaged in some economic activity other than cultivators, agricultural labourers and household workers. It includes factory, mining, plantation, transport and office workers, those engaged in business and commerce, teachers, entertainment artistes and so on.

=== Infrastructure ===
There are 107 inhabited villages in Deganga CD Block, as per the District Census Handbook: North 24 Parganas. 100% villages have power supply. 106 villages (99.07%) have drinking water supply. 18 villages (16.82%) have post offices. 107 villages (100%) have telephones (including landlines, public call offices and mobile phones). 38 villages (35.51%) have a pucca approach road and 35 villages (32.71%) have transport communication (includes bus service, rail facility and navigable waterways). 13 villages (12.15%) have agricultural credit societies and 12 villages (11.21 ) have banks.

=== Agriculture ===
The North 24 Parganas district Human Development Report opines that in spite of agricultural productivity in North 24 Parganas district being rather impressive 81.84% of rural population suffered from shortage of food. With a high urbanisation of 54.3% in 2001, the land use pattern in the district is changing quite fast and the area under cultivation is declining. However, agriculture is still the major source of livelihood in the rural areas of the district.

From 1977 on wards major land reforms took place in West Bengal. Land in excess of land ceiling was acquired and distributed amongst the peasants. Following land reforms land ownership pattern has undergone transformation. In 2010–11, persons engaged in agriculture in Deganga CD Block could be classified as follows: bargadars 2,113 (3.39%), patta (document) holders 5,399 (8.67%), small farmers (possessing land between 1 and 2 hectares) 3,965 (6.37%), marginal farmers (possessing land up to 1 hectare) 25,590 (41.10%) and agricultural labourers 25,202 (40.47%).

Deganga CD Block had no fertiliser depots, no seed stores and no fair price shops in 2010–11.

In 2010–11, Deganga CD Block produced 21,270 tonnes of Aman paddy, the main winter crop from 8,622 hectares, 30,470 tonnes of Boro paddy (spring crop) from 8,827 hectares, 1,172 tonnes of Aus paddy (summer crop) from 450 hectares, 3,146 tonnes of wheat from 1,184 hectares, 118,845 tonnes of jute from 5,068 hectares and 63,363 tonnes of potatoes from 1,398 hectares. It also produced pulses and oilseeds.

In 2010–11, the total area irrigated in Degnaga CD Block was 249 hectares, out of which 212 hectares were irrigated by deep tube well and 37 hectares by shallow tube well.

=== Pisciculture ===
In 2010–11, the net area under effective pisciculture in Deganga CD Block was 1,636.18 hectares. 30,088 persons were engaged in the profession. Approximate annual production was 49,085.4 quintals.

=== Banking ===
In 2010–11, Deganga CD Block had offices of 10 commercial banks and 2 gramin banks.

== Transport ==
SH 2 passes through this CD Block.

== Education ==
In 2010–11, Deganga CD Block had 167 primary schools with 17,737 students, 3 middle schools with 470 students, 9 high schools with 8,429 students and 15 higher secondary schools with 22,806 students. Deganga CD Block had 1 general college with 3,241 students, 1 professional/ technical institution with 567 students and 439 institutions for special and non-formal education with 25,696 students.

As per the 2011 census, in Deganga CD Block, amongst the 107 inhabited villages, 1 village did not have a school, 63 villages had more than 1 primary school, 53 villages had at least 1 primary and 1 middle school and 30 villages had at least 1 middle and 1 secondary school.

Chandraketugarh Sahidullah Smriti Mahavidyalaya was established at Berachampa in 1997.

== Healthcare ==
In 2011, Deganga CD Block had 1 block primary health centre and 3 primary health centres, with total 15 beds and 5 doctors (excluding private bodies). It had 37 family welfare subcentres. 222 patients were treated indoors and 28,019 patients were treated outdoor in the hospitals, health centres and subcentres of the CD Block.

Biswanathpur Rural Hospital at Deganga with 30 beds functions as the main medical facility in Deganga CD Block. There are |primary health centres at Ajinagar (Hadipur-Jhikra PHC with 6 beds), Chakla (Raypur Chakla PHC with 10 beds), Deganga (Kolsur PHC with 10 beds) and Kartickpur (with 6 beds).

Deganga is one of the areas where groundwater is affected by arsenic contamination. In Kolsur in Deganga area, Pal Trockner's arsenic removal technology was used at an expenditure of over Rs 30 million. Experts feel that the entire expenditure has gone waste. Aqua Welfare Society, a non government organization (NGO), has been providing arsenic safe water to the local through rain water harvesting. They are providing the water through modified dugwells, the water which is treated with chlorine regularly. AWS has organised several interactive workshops including one on water at Kolsur High School, on 26 November 2006. The participants were informed that by 2009 the state government had planned to provide water through pipelines that would either be treated river water or water from the third aquifer (deep tubewell) that is arsenic free. However, it was also mentioned that the remote villages where it would be difficult to provide the pipelines the villagers would need to use alternate sources for their drinking water.
