= Barasat I =

- Community development block
- Interactive map of Barasat I
- Coordinates: 22.7672188°N 88.5414362°E
- Country: India
- State: West Bengal
- District: North 24 Parganas

Government
  - Type: Representative democracy

Area
  - Total: 104.97 km^{2} (40.53 sq mi)

Population (2011)
  - Total: 294,628
  - Density: 2,806.8/km^{2} (7,269.5/sq mi)

Languages
  - Official: Bengali, English

Literacy (2011)
  - Total literates: 214,596 (81.50%)
- Time zone: UTC+5:30 (IST)
- Telephone/STD code: 033
- ISO 3166 code: IN-WB
- Vehicle registration: WB-23, WB-24, WB-25, WB-26
- Lok Sabha constituency: Barasat
- Vidhan Sabha constituency: Barasat, Madhyamgram, Deganaga, Amdanga
- Website: north24parganas.nic.in

Barasat I is a community development block that forms an administrative division in Barasat Sadar subdivision of North 24 Parganas district in the Indian state of West Bengal.

== Geography ==
Barasat I block is located at 22°46′02″N 88°32′29″E.

Barasat I CD Block is bounded by Habra I, Habra II and Amdanga CD Blocks in the north, Deganga CD Block in the east, Barasat II CD Block in the south and Barrackpore II CD Block in the west. The Barrackpore industrial area with such municipalities as New Barrackpore, Madhyamgram and North Dumdum is in the west, and Barasat municipality is in the south.

Barasat I CD Block is part of the North Hooghly Flat, one of the three physiographic regions in the district located in the lower Ganges Delta. It is a raised alluvium area along the Hooghly, which forms the western boundary of the district.

Barasat I CD Block has an area of 104.97 km^{2}. It has 1 panchayat samity, 9 gram panchayats, 152 gram sansads (village councils), 81 mouzas and 81 inhabited villages as per the District Statistical Handbook: North 24 Parganas.Duttapukur police station has jurisdiction over Barasat I CD Block. Headquarters of this CD Block is at Chhota Jagulia.

Gram panchayats of Barasat I block/panchayat samiti are: Chhota Jagulia, Ichhapur–Nilganj, Kotra, Purba Khilkapur, Dattapukur I, Kadambagachhi, Paschim Khilkapur, Dattapukur II, and Kashimpur.

== Demographics ==
=== Population ===
As per 2011 Census of India, Barasat I CD Block had a total population of 294,628, of which 175,226 were rural and 119,402 were urban. There were 150,919 (51%) males and 143,709 (49%) females. The population below 6 years was 31,333. Scheduled Castes numbered 47,026 (15.96%) and Scheduled Tribes numbered 2,546 (0.86%).

As per 2001 census, Barasat I block had a total population of 237,783, out of which 122,560 were males and 115,223 were females.

There are several census towns in Barasat I CD Block (2011 census figures in brackets): Kokapur (6,317), Shibalaya (5,830), Gangapur (6,301), Chandrapur (5,047), Nebadhai Duttapukur (25,557), Chatta Baria (12,537), Joypul (16,134), Digha (8,159), Kulberia (6,993), Bamangachhi (6,824), Chak Barbaria (8,088) and Koyra (11,615).

Large villages in Barasat I CD Block (2011 census figures in brackets): Khilkapur (4,501), Maynagadi (P) (4,058), Barbaria (4,764), Patincha (4,474), Kashimpur (5,427), Sikdeshpukhuria (4,355), Mandalganti (5,151), Murali (4,056), Pirgachha (4,526), Bara (P) (5,412), Chhota Jagulia (4,043), Bahera (5,369), Jirat (5,337), Ula (4,058), Kanthalia (5,724) and Kadambagachhi (8,240).

North 24 Parganas district is densely populated, mainly because of the influx of refugees from East Pakistan (later Bangladesh). With a population density of population of 2,182 per km^{2} in 1971, it was 3rd in terms of density per km^{2} in West Bengal after Kolkata and Howrah, and 20th in India. According to the District Human Development Report: North 24 Parganas, “High density is also explained partly by the rapid growth of urbanization in the district. In 1991, the percentage of urban population in the district has been 51.23.”

Decadal Population Growth Rate (%)

The decadal growth of population in Barasat I CD Block in 2001-2011 was 23.75%. The decadal growth of population in Barasat I CD Block in 1991-2001 was -4.63%. The decadal growth of population in Barasat municipality in 1991-2001 was 125.52%.

The decadal growth rate of population in North 24 Parganas district was as follows: 47.9% in 1951–61, 34.5% in 1961–71, 31.4% in 1971–81, 31.7% in 1981–91, 22.7% in 1991-2001 and 12.0% in 2001-11. The decadal growth rate for West Bengal in 2001-11 was 13.93%. The decadal growth rate for West Bengal was 17.84% in 1991-2001, 24.73% in 1981-1991, and 23.17% in 1971-1981.

Only a small portion of the border with Bangladesh has been fenced, and it is popularly referred to as a porous border. It is freely used by Bangladeshi infiltrators, terrorists, smugglers, criminals, et al.

=== Literacy ===
As per the 2011 census, the total number of literates in Barasat I CD Block was 214,596 (81.50% of the population over 6 years) out of which males numbered 113,770 (84.42% of the male population over 6 years) and females numbered 100,826 (78.44% of the female population over 6 years). The gender disparity (the difference between female and male literacy rates) was 5.98%. It is the lowest gender disparity in literacy among the CD Blocks in North 24 Parganas district.

See also – List of West Bengal districts ranked by literacy rate

Literacy in CD blocks of
North 24 Parganas district
Barasat Sadar subdivision
Amdanga – 80.69%
Deganga – 79.65%
Barasat I – 81.50%
Barasat II – 77.71%
Habra I – 83.15%
Habra II – 81.05%
Rajarhat – 83.13%
Basirhat subdivision
Baduria – 78.75%
Basirhat I – 72.10%
Basirhat II – 78.30%
Haroa – 73.13%
Hasnabad – 71.47%
Hingalganj – 76.85%
Minakhan – 71.33%
Sandeshkhali I – 71.08%
Sandeshkhali II – 70.96%
Swarupnagar – 77.57%
Bangaon subdivision
Bagdah – 75.30%
Bangaon – 79.71%
Gaighata – 82.32%
Barrackpore subdivision
Barrackpore I – 85.91%
Barrackpore II – 84.53%
Source: 2011 Census: CD Block Wise
Primary Census Abstract Data

=== Language and religion ===
Religion in Barasat I CD block (2011)
Hinduism	57.10%
Islam	42.08%
Other or not stated	0.49%

In the 2011 census, Hindus numbered 170,302 and formed 57.10% of the population in Barasat I CD Block. Muslims numbered 129,870 and formed 42.08% of the population. Others numbered 1,456 and formed 0.49% of the population.

In 1981, Hindus numbered 100,485 and formed 45.96% of the population and Muslims numbered 118,012 and formed 53.94% of the population in Barasat I CD Block. In 1991, Hindus numbered 289,932 and formed 59.25% of the population and Muslims numbered 198,458 and formed 40.56% of the population in Barasat I and Barasat II CD Blocks taken together. (In 1981 and 1991, census was conducted as per jurisdiction of the police station). In 2001, Hindus numbered 133,158 (55.93%) and Muslims 104,451 (43.87%).

Languages of Barasat I CD block (2011)
1. Bengali (98.6%)
2. Hindi (1.20%)
3. Others (0.22%)

At the time of the 2011 census, 98.58% of the population spoke Bengali and 1.20% Hindi as their first language.

== Rural Poverty ==
8.63% of households in Barasat I CD Block lived below poverty line in 2001, against an average of 29.28% in North 24 Parganas district.

== Economy ==
=== Livelihood ===
Livelihood
in Barasat I CD Block
1. Cultivators (7.31%)
2. Agricultural labourers (15.2%)
3. Household industries (6.59%)
4. Other Workers (70.9%)

In Barasat I CD Block in 2011, amongst the class of total workers, cultivators numbered 7,635 and formed 7.31% of the total workers, agricultural labourers numbered 15,880 and formed 15.20%, household industry workers numbered 6,885 and formed 6.59% and other workers numbered 74,046 and formed 70.89%. Total workers numbered 104,446 and formed 35.45% of the total population, and non-workers numbered 190,182 and formed 64.55% of the population.

In more than 30 percent of the villages in North 24 Parganas, agriculture or household industry is no longer the major source of livelihood for the main workers there. The CD Blocks in the district can be classified as belonging to three categories: border areas, Sundarbans area and other rural areas. The percentage of other workers in the other rural areas category is considerably higher than those in the border areas and Sundarbans area.

Note: In the census records a person is considered a cultivator, if the person is engaged in cultivation/ supervision of land owned by self/government/institution. When a person who works on another person's land for wages in cash or kind or share, is regarded as an agricultural labourer. Household industry is defined as an industry conducted by one or more members of the family within the household or village, and one that does not qualify for registration as a factory under the Factories Act. Other workers are persons engaged in some economic activity other than cultivators, agricultural labourers and household workers. It includes factory, mining, plantation, transport and office workers, those engaged in business and commerce, teachers, entertainment artistes and so on.

=== Infrastructure ===
There are 70 inhabited villages in Barasat I CD Block, as per the District Census Handbook: North 24 Parganas. 100% villages have power supply and drinking water supply. 8 villages (11.43%) have post offices. 62 villages (88.57%) have telephones (including landlines, public call offices and mobile phones). 55 villages (78.57%) have a pucca approach road and 16 villages (22.86%) have transport communication (includes bus service, rail facility and navigable waterways). 3 villages (4.29%) have agricultural credit societies and 7 villages (10.00%) have banks.

=== Agriculture ===
The North 24 Parganas district Human Development Report opines that in spite of agricultural productivity in North 24 Parganas district being rather impressive 81.84% of rural population suffered from shortage of food. With a high urbanisation of 54.3% in 2001, the land use pattern in the district is changing quite fast and the area under cultivation is declining. However, agriculture is still the major source of livelihood in the rural areas of the district.

From 1977 on wards major land reforms took place in West Bengal. Land in excess of land ceiling was acquired and distributed among the peasants. Following land reforms, and ownership pattern has undergone transformation. In 2010–11, persons engaged in agriculture in Barasat I CD Block could be classified as follows: bargadars 913 (3.85%), patta (document) holders 2,680 (11.31%), small farmers (possessing land between 1 and 2 hectares) 248 (1.05%), marginal farmers (possessing land up to 1 hectare) 10,145 (42.80%) and agricultural labourers 9,719 (41.00%).

Barasat I CD Block had 42 fertiliser depots and 41 seed stores in 2010-11.

In 2010–11, Barasat I CD Block produced 7,470 tonnes of Aman paddy, the main winter crop from 3,010 hectares, 5,089 tonnes of Boro paddy (spring crop) from 1,642 hectares, 19,581 tonnes of jute from 1,308 hectares and 1,689 tonnes of potatoes from 49 hectares. It also produced pulses and oilseeds.

In 2010–11, the total area irrigated in Barasat I CD Block was 488 hectares, out of which 88 hectares were irrigated by canal water, 100 hectares by river lift irrigation, 350 hectares by deep tube well and 38 hectares by shallow tube well.

=== Pisciculture ===
In 2010–11, the net area under effective pisciculture in Barasat I CD Block was 734.16 hectares. 16,808 persons were engaged in the profession. Approximate annual production was 22,024.8 quintals.

=== Banking ===
In 2010–11, Barasat I CD Block had offices of 16 commercial banks and 1 gramin bank.

== Transport ==
In 2010–11, Barasat I CD Block had 13 originating/ terminating bus routes.

NH 12 (old numbering NH 34) (part of the stretch from Kolkata to Barasat is also known as Jessore Road) passes through this CD Block and (NH 112 (old numbering NH 35) (also known as Jessore Road) from Barasat.

There are Duttapukur railway station, Bamangachhi railway station, Barasat Junction railway station, Hridaypur railway station and Madhyamgram railway station on the Sealdah-Bangaon line. There is Kazipara railway station on the Barasat-Hasnabad line.

== Education ==
In 2010–11, Barasat I CD Block had 93 primary schools with 13,270 students, 2 middle schools with 34 students, 9 high schools with 7,891 students and 12 higher secondary schools with 18,358 students. Barasat I CD Block had 1 general college with 531 students, 3 professional/ technical institutions with 519 students, 371 institutions for special and non-formal education with 18,497 students.

As per the 2011 census, in Barasat I CD Block, amongst the 70 inhabited villages, 2 villages did not have a school, 26 villages had more than 1 primary school, 29 villages had at least 1 primary and 1 middle school and 16 villages had at least 1 middle and 1 secondary school.

West Bengal State University was established at Berunanpukuria in 2008.

Kingston College of Science was established at Berunanpukuria in 2004.

Adamas Institute of Technology was established at Barbaria, PO Jagannathpur, in 2008-2009.

== Healthcare ==
In 2011, Barasat I CD Block had 1 block primary health centre and 2 primary health centres, with total 15 beds and 4 doctors (excluding private bodies). It had 36 family welfare subcentres. 1,836 patients were treated indoors and 76,390 patients were treated outdoor in the hospitals, health centres and subcentres of the CD Block.

Chhota Jagulia block primary health centre at Chhota Jagulia with 15 beds functions as the main medical facility in Barasat I CD Block. There are primary health centres at Kadambagachi (with 10 beds) and Duttapukur (with 6 beds).

Barasat I block is one of the areas where ground water is affected by arsenic contamination.
