= Chhota Jagulia =

- Village
- Location in West Bengal, India Chhota Jagulia (India)
- Coordinates: 22.747219°N 88.535436°E
- Country: India
- State: West Bengal
- District: North 24 Parganas

Population (2011)
  - Total: 4,043

Languages
  - Official: Bengali, English
- Time zone: UTC+5:30 (IST)
- PIN: 743294 (Chhota Jagulia)
- Telephone/STD code: 033
- Lok Sabha constituency: Barasat
- Vidhan Sabha constituency: Barasat
- Website: north24parganas.nic.in

Chhota Jagulia is a village and a gram panchayat in the Barasat I CD Block in the Barasat Sadar subdivision of the North 24 Parganas district in the state of West Bengal, India.

== Geography ==
Cities, towns and locations in Barasat subdivision, North 24 Parganas
M: municipal town, CT: census town, R: rural/ urban centre, H: historical centre
Owing to space constraints in the small map, the actual locations in a larger map may vary slightly

=== Location ===
Chhota Jagulia is located at 22.747219°N 88.535436°E

Towns/ villages in Chhota Jagulia gram panchayat are:Bahera, Bamangachhi, Bara, Bazitpur, Chhota Jagulia, Kulberia, Maliakur, Malikapur, Mandalganti, Murali, Sikdeshpukhuria and Tentulia.

=== Area overview ===
The area covered in the map alongside is largely a part of the north Bidyadhari Plain. located in the lower Ganges Delta. The country is flat. It is a little raised above flood level and the highest ground borders the river channels. 54.67% of the people of the densely populated area lives in the urban areas and 45.33% lives in the rural areas.

Note: The map alongside presents some of the notable locations in the subdivision. All places marked in the map are linked in the larger full screen map.

== Civic administration ==
=== CD block HQ ===
The headquarters of Barasat I CD block are located at Chhota Jagulia.

== Demographics ==
According to the 2011 Census of India, Chhota Jagulia had a total population of 4,043, of which 2,087 (52%) were males and 1,956 (48%) were females. Population in the age range 0–6 years was 279. The total number of literate persons in Chhota Jagulia was 3,208 (87.67% of the population over 6 years).

== Transport ==
Chhota Jagulia is located off NH 35 (Jessore Road).

== Education ==
Chhota Jagulia High School, a Bengali medium co-educational higher secondary school was established in 1847. It is one of the oldest school in Bengal and has arrangements for teaching from class V to XII.

== Healthcare ==
Chhota Jagulia block primary health centre with 15 beds is the main medical facility in Barasat I CD block. There are primary health centres at Kadambagachi (with 10 beds) and Duttapukur (with 6 beds).

== See also ==
Map of Barasat I CD Block on Page 393 of District Census Handbook.
