= Barasat Sadar subdivision =

- Subdivision
- Interactive map of Barasat Sadar subdivision
- Coordinates: 22.72°N 88.48°E
- Country: India
- State: West Bengal
- District: North 24 Parganas
- Headquarters: Barasat

Area
  - Total: 1,002.48 km^{2} (387.06 sq mi)

Population (2011)
  - Total: 2,789,611
  - Density: 2,782.71/km^{2} (7,207.19/sq mi)

Languages
  - Official: Bengali, English
- Time zone: UTC+5:30 (IST)
- ISO 3166 code: ISO 3166-2:IN

Barasat Sadar subdivision is an administrative subdivision of the North 24 Parganas district in the Indian state of West Bengal.

== History ==
In 1757, the East India Company obtained the zamindari or land-holders rights of the 24 Parganas Zamindari from Mir Jafar, the new Nawab of Bengal. Full proprietary status was handed over to Robert Clive in 1759 by a sanad or deed granting him the 24 Parganas as a jagir. After Clive's death in 1774, full proprietary rights of the 24 Parganas zamindari reverted to the East India Company. In 1814, the district consisted of two parts – the suburbs of Kolkata (referred to as Dihi Panchannagram) and the rest. In 1834, several parganas of Jessore and Nadia were added to the 24 Parganas. The district was divided into two divisions. The Alipore division comprised territories originally ceded to the company and the Barasat division comprised territories added from Jessore and Nadia. The two divisions were replaced by eight subdivisions in 1861 – Diamond Harbour, Baruipur, Alipore, Dum Dum, Barrackpore, Barasat, Basirhat and Satkhira. The Satkhira subdivision was transferred to the newly formed Khulna district in 1882, the Baruipur subdivision was abolished in 1883 and the Dum Dum and Barrackpore subdivisions were abolished in 1893. Barrackpore subdivision was reconstituted in 1904 with portions of Barasat and Alipore subdivisions. In 2015, Rajarhat-Gopalpur Municipality and Mahisbathan II gram panchayat were merged with the new-formed Bidhannagar Municipal Corporation. Subsequently Rajarhat-Gopalpur Municipality and Rajarhat (Community development block) were transferred to Bidhannagar subdivision and thus the area of Barasat Sadar subdivision is reduced.

== Geography ==
Cities, towns and locations in Barasat subdivision, North 24 Parganas
M: municipal town, CT: census town, R: rural/ urban centre, H: historical centre
Owing to space constraints in the small map, the actual locations in a larger map may vary slightly

Some areas of Barasat Sadar subdivision are part of the North Hooghly Flat and other areas are part of the North Bidyadhari Plain, two of the three physiographic regions in the district located in the lower Ganges Delta. The country is flat. It is a little raised above flood level and the highest ground borders the river channels. The sturdy peasants raise crops of rice, jute and sugarcane from the alluvial soil. There are clumps of palm and fruit trees in which village homesteads nestle.

== Subdivisions ==

North 24 Parganas district is divided into the following administrative subdivisions:

Subdivision	Headquarters	Area km^{2}	Population (2011)	Urban Population % (2011)	Rural Population % (2011)
Bangaon	Bangaon	838.17	1,063,028	16.33	83.67
Barasat Sadar	Barasat	1,002.48	2,789,611	54.67	45.33
Barrackpore	Barrackpore	334.51	3,668,653	96.02	3.98
Bidhannagar	Bidhannagar	33.50	216,609	100.00	0
Basirhat	Basirhat	1,777.02	2,271,880	12.96	87.04
North 24 Parganas district	Barasat	4,094.00	10,009,781	57.27	42.73

== Religion ==
Given below is an overview of the religion-wise break-up of the population across the subdivisions of North 24 Parganas district, as per 2011 census:

Subdivision	Population (2011)	Hindu %	Muslim %	Christian %	Others %
Bangaon	1,063,028	85.63	13.73	0.26	0.38
Barasat Sadar	2,789,611	65.18	34.26	0.16	0.40
Barrackpore	3,668,653	88.61	10.32	0.35	0.71
Bidhannagar	216,609	95.26	2.56	0.45	1.73
Basirhat	2,271,880	51.37	48.37	0.14	0.13
North 24 Parganas district	10,009,781	73.45	25.82	0.24	0.48

North 24 Parganas district with 24.22% Muslims (in 2001) has been identified as a minority concentrated district by the Ministry of Minority Affairs, Government of India. A baseline survey on religious minority population has been carried out under the aegis of Indian Council of Social Science Research and funded by the Ministry of Minority Affairs. For information on the survey see North 24 Parganas: minority concentrated district.

== Population movement ==
North 24 Parganas district is densely populated, mainly because of the influx of refugees from East Pakistan (later Bangladesh). With a density of population of 2,182 per km^{2} in 1971, it was 3rd in terms of density per km^{2} in West Bengal after Kolkata and Howrah, and 20th in India. According to the District Human Development Report: North 24 Parganas, "High density is also explained partly by the rapid growth of urbanization in the district. In 1991, the percentage of urban population in the district has been 51.23."

As per the Refugee Relief and Rehabilitation Department of the Government of West Bengal, the census figures show the number of refugees from East Pakistan in 1971 was nearly 6 million (60 lakhs) and in 1981, the number was assessed at 8 million (80 lakhs). A district-wise break-up in 1971, shows the main thrust of the refugee influx was on 24-Parganas (22.3% of the total refugees), Nadia (20.3%), Bankura (19.1%) and Kolkata (12.9%).

The North 24 Paraganas district has a 352 km long international border with Bangladesh, out of which 160 km is land border and 192 km is riverine border. Only a small portion of the border has been fenced and it is popularly referred to as a porous border. There are reports of Bangladeshi infiltrators. The CD Block pages carry Decadal Population Growth information.

An estimate made in 2000 places the total number of illegal Bangladeshi immigrants in India at 1.5 crore, with around 3 lakh entering every year. The thumb rule for such illegal immigrants is that for each illegal person caught four get through. While many immigrants have settled in the border areas, some have moved on, even to far way places such as Mumbai and Delhi. The border is guarded by the Border Security Force. During the UPA government, Sriprakash Jaiswal, Union Minister of State for Home Affairs, had made a statement in Parliament on 14 July 2004, that there were 12 million illegal Bangladeshi infiltrators living in India, and West Bengal topped the list with 5.7 million Bangladeshis. More recently, Kiren Rijiju, Minister of State for Home Affairs in the NDA government has put the figure at around 20 million.

== Administrative units ==
Barasat Sadar subdivision has 13 police stations (now 9), 7 community development blocks (now 6), 7 panchayat samitis (now 6), 58 gram panchayats (now 52), 523 mouzas, 493 inhabited villages, 6 municipalities (now 5) and 34 census towns (now 25).

The municipalities are at Barasat, Habra, Gobardanga, Ashoknagar Kalyangarh, Madhyamgram and Rajarhat-Gopalpur (made part of Bidhannagar Municipal Corporation in 2015 and also transferred to Bidhannagar subdivision).

The census towns are: Nokpul, Maslandapur, Sadpur, Betpuli, Anarbaria, Purba Narayanpur, Guma, Bara Bamonia, Khordabamonia, Bira, Dhania, Kokapur, Shibalaya, Gangapur, Chandrapur, Nebadhai Duttapukur, Chatta Baria, Joypul, Digha, Kulberia, Bamangachhi, Chak Barbaria, Koyra, Deara, Deulia, Raigachhi^{1}, Rekjuani^{1}, Bhatenda^{1}, Basina^{1}, Bishnupur^{1}, Chandpur Champagachhi^{1}, Jatragachhi^{1}, Ghuni^{1} and Sulangari^{1}. The subdivision has its headquarters at Barasat.

Note 1: In 2015, these 9 census towns were transferred to Bidhannagar subdivision.

== Kolkata Urban Agglomeration ==
The following Municipalities and Census Towns in Barasat Sadar subdivision were part of Kolkata Urban Agglomeration in the 2011 census: Barasat (M), Madhyamgram (M), Rajarhat-Gopalpur (M) (made part of Bidhannagar Municipal Corporation in 2015 and also transferred to Bidhannagar subdivision) and Raigachhi (CT) (transferred to Bidhannagar subdivision in 2015).

== Police stations ==
Police stations in Barasat Sadar subdivision have the following features and jurisdiction:

Police station	Area covered (km^{2})	Border (km)	Municipal town/ city	CD Block
Habra	n/a	-	Habra,	Habra I
Ashoknagar	174.5	-	Ashoknagar Kalyangarh	Habra II
Shasan	n/a	-	-	Barasat II partly
Duttapukur	104.34	-	-	Barasat I
Barasat	4.6	-	Barasat municipal area	-
Madhyamgram	n/a	-	Madhyamgram	Barasat II partly
Amdanga	138.8	-	-	Amdanga
Deganga	202.09	-	-	Deganga
Women PS (Barasat)	n/a	-	n/a	n/a

== Blocks ==

Community development blocks in Barasat Sadar subdivision are:

CD Block	Headquarters	Area km^{2}	Population (2011)	SC %	ST %	Hindus %	Muslims %	Literacy rate %	Census Towns
Habra I	Habra	117.36	225,200	34.62	2.83	73.51	25.81	83.15	6
Habra II	Guma	112.67	176,490	17.94	2.31	50.85	48.76	81.05	4
Amdanga	Amdanga	139.27	191,673	18.16	1.50	41.30	58.48	80.69	1
Barasat I	Chhota Jagulia	104.97	294,628	15.96	0.86	55.43	44.08	81.50	12
Barasat II	Krishnapur Madanpur	114.04	200,918	10.47	1.27	25.93	73.81	77.71	1
Deganga	Deulia	202.09	319,213	12.23	0.80	28.79	70.92	79.65	1
Rajarhat^{1}	Rajarhat	72.90	189,893	35.05	0.62	59.41	39.90	83.13	9

Note 1: In 2015, Rajarhat (community development block) was transferred to Bidhannagar subdivision.

== Gram panchayats ==
The subdivision contains 58 (now 52) gram panchayats under 7 (now 6) community development blocks:

- Gram panchayats in Barasat I CD Block are: Chhoto Jagulia, Ichhapur–Nilganj, Kotra, Purba Khilkapur, Dattapukur–I, Kadambagachhi, Paschim Khilkapur, Dattapukur–II and Kashimpur.
- Gram panchayats in Barasat II CD Block are: Chandigarh–Rohanda, Falti Beliaghata, Kemia Khamarpara, Kirtipur–I, Dadpur, Kiritipur–II and Shason.
- Gram panchayats in Amdanga CD Block are: Adhata, Bodai, Maricha, Amdanga, Chandigarh, Sadhanpur, Beraberia and Taraberia.
- Gram panchayats in Deganga CD Block are: Amulia, Champatala, Hadipur Jhikra–I, Sohai–Shwetpur, Berachampa–I, Chaurashi, Hadipur Jhikra–II, Berachampa–II, Deganga–I, Kolsur, Chakla, Deganga–II and Nurnagar.
- Gram panchayats in Habra I CD Block are: Bargum–I, Kumra, Machhlandapur–II, Rautara, Bargum–II, Machhlandapur–I and Prithiba.
- Gram panchayats in Habra II CD Block are: Banspole, Bhurkunda, Guma–I, Rajibpur Bira, Beraberi, Dighara Malikberia, Guma–II and Srikrishnapur.
- Gram panchayats in Rajarhat CD Block^{1} are: Chandpur, Mahisbathan–II, Rajarhat Bishnupur–I, Jangrahatiara–II, Patharghata and Rajarhat Bishnupur–II.

Note 1: In 2015, this CD Block was completely transferred to Bidhannagar subdivision.

== Municipal towns/ cities ==
An overview of the municipal towns and cities in Barasat Sadar subdivision is given below.

Municipal town/city	Area (km^{2})	Population (2011)	Hindu %	Muslim %	Slum population %	BPL Households % (2006)	Literacy% (2001)
Barasat	31.41	278,435	87.23	11.98	15.52	9.97	84.74
Habra	22.68	147,221	98.32	1.44	15.60	28.84	86.34
Gobardanga	10.36	45,377	96.47	3.13	-	47.88	87.28
Ashokanagar Kalyangarh	20.48	121,592	97.18	2.45	23.39	13.53	88.21
Madhyamgram	21.32	196,127	89.36	9.76	-	14.27	83.88
Rajarhat-Gopalpur^{1}	34.97	402,844	84.13	14.91	9.13	15.51	84.31

Note 1: Bidhannagar Municipal Corporation was formed in 2015 and Rajarhat-Gopalpur Municipality has been part of it and also transferred to Bidhannagar subdivision.

== Education ==
North 24 Parganas district had a literacy rate of 84.06% (for population of 7 years and above), as per the 2011 census. Bangaon subdivision had a literacy rate of 80.57%, Barasat Sadar subdivision 84.90%, Barrackpur subdivision 89.09%, Bidhannagar subdivision 89.16% and Basirhat subdivision 75.67%.

Given in the table below (data in numbers) is a comprehensive picture of the education scenario in North 24 Parganas district for the year 2012-13:

Subdivision	Primary School		Middle School		High School		Higher Secondary School		General College, Univ		Technical / Professional Instt		Non-formal Education	
Subdivision	Institution	Student	Institution	Student	Institution	Student	Institution	Student	Institution	Student	Institution	Student	Institution	Student
Bangaon	533	54,361	1	36	31	14,654	83	107,745	4	11,031	1	95	1,594	54,016
Barasat Sadar	920	120,670	19	2,734	93	63,707	171	246,098	14	40,466	23	6,190	2,887	130,522
Barrackpore	948	126,453	29	5,716	193	165,924	205	215,713	25	44,818	20	6,345	2,483	160,236
Bidhannagar	20	12,317	-	-	1	900	17	22,536	1	865	15	5,432	1	552
Basirhat	1,256	139,737	25	10,165	124	101,536	118	105,724	5	15,248	-	-	3,800	164,833
North 24 Parganas district	3,677	453,538	74	18,651	442	346,721	594	697,816	49	112,428	59	18,062	10,765	439,560

Note: Primary schools include junior basic schools; middle schools, high schools and higher secondary schools include madrasahs; technical schools include junior technical schools, junior government polytechnics, industrial technical institutes, industrial training centres, nursing training institutes etc.; technical and professional colleges include engineering colleges, medical colleges, para-medical institutes, management colleges, teachers training and nursing training colleges, law colleges, art colleges, music colleges etc. Special and non-formal education centres include sishu siksha kendras, madhyamik siksha kendras, centres of Rabindra mukta vidyalaya, recognised Sanskrit tols, institutions for the blind and other handicapped persons, Anganwadi centres, reformatory schools etc.

The following institutes are located in Barasat Sadar subdivision:

- West Bengal State University was established at Berunanpukuria in 2008. In 2018, WBSU has made it to the comprehensive list of the best public universities in Bengal. The rating was by Careers 369, the country's largest education and career counselling portal.
- Barasat Government College was established at Barasat in 1950.
- Barasat Government Medical College and Hospital was established at Barasat in 2022.
- Barasat College was established at Barasat in 1972.
- Sarada Ma Girl's College was established at Nabapally, Barasat in 2006.
- Gobardanga Hindu College was established at Gobardanga in 1947.
- Kingston College of Science was established at Berunanpukuria in 2004.
- Vivekananda College was established at Madhyamgram in 1986.
- Sree Chaitanya College was established at Habra in 1956.
- Sree Chaitanya Mahavidyalaya (formerly Sree Chaitanya College of Commerce) was established at Habra in 1965.
- Netaji Satabarshiki Mahavidyalaya was established at Ashoknagar in 2000.
- Banipur Mahila Mahavidyalaya was established at Banipur, Habra, in 1999.
- Chandraketugarh Sahidullah Smriti Mahavidyalaya was established at Berachampa in 1997.
- Amdanga Jugal Kishore Mahavidyalaya was established at Sadhanpur in 2007.
- Techno India, Banipur is a private engineering college.
- Savita Devi Education Trust – Brainware Group of Institutions, established at Barasat in 2010, offers courses in engineering and management.
- Camellia School of Engineering & Technology was established at Barasat in 2006.
- Derozio Memorial College^{1} was established at Rajarhat in 1996.
- Dr. A.P.J. Abdul Kalam Government College^{1} was established at New Town, Kolkata in 2013.
- St. Xavier's University, Kolkata^{1}, a private Jesuit university, was established at New Town, Kolkata in January 2017.
- University of Engineering & Management (UEM), Kolkata^{1}, a private university, was established at New Town, Kolkata in 2015.
- Amity University, Kolkata^{1}, a private university, was established at New Town, Kolkata in 2015.
- Aliah University^{1} was initially founded as Mohammedan College in 1880 and was elevated as a university in 2008. The main campus of the university is located at New Town, Kolkata.
- B. P. Poddar Institute of Management & Technology^{1} was established near Netaji Subhas Chandra Bose International Airport in 1999.

Note 1: Bidhannagar Municipal Corporation was formed in 2015 and Rajarhat-Gopalpur Municipality has been part of it and also transferred to Bidhannagar subdivision. Hence all the educational institutions in Rajarhat-Gopalpur Municipality are now in Bidhannagar subdivision, not in Barasat Sadar Subdivision.

== Healthcare ==
The table below (all data in numbers) presents an overview of the medical facilities available and patients treated in the hospitals, health centres and sub-centres in 2013 in North 24 Parganas district.

Subdivision	Health & Family Welfare Deptt, WB				Other State Govt Deptts**	Local bodies**	Central Govt Deptts / PSUs**	NGO / Private Nursing Homes**	Total	Total Number of Beds	Total Number of Doctors*	Indoor Patients	Outdoor Patients
Subdivision	Hospitals	Rural Hospitals	Block Primary Health Centres	Primary Health Centres	Other State Govt Deptts**	Local bodies**	Central Govt Deptts / PSUs**	NGO / Private Nursing Homes**	Total	Total Number of Beds	Total Number of Doctors*	Indoor Patients	Outdoor Patients
Bangaon	1	1	2	10	-	-	-	-	14	417	24	11,587	650,349
Barasat Sadar	3	1	6	15	-	-	-	-	25	1,084	45	125,000	1,397,574
Barrackpore	7	-	2	2	-	-	-	-	11	1,081	8	94,042	1,010,820
Bidhannagar	1	-	-	-	-	-	-	`	1	100	-	6,567	117,136
Basirhat	1	5	5	23	-	-	-	-	34	703	77	69,034	897,725
North 24 Parganas district	13	7	15	50	6	27	3	233	354	3,385	154	306,230	4,073,604

.* Excluding nursing homes.
**Subdivision-wise break up for certain items not available.

Medical facilities available in Barasat Sadar subdivision are as follows:

Hospitals: (Name, location, beds)
District Hospital, Barasat, 500 beds
District Jail Hospital, Barasat, 15 beds
Ashoknagar State General Hospital, Ashoknagar, 50 beds
Habra State General Hospital, Habra, 131 beds
NSC Bose Specialised Hospital, Madhyamgram, 60 beds
Vidyasagar Matri Sadan, Rajarhat, 20 beds^{1}
Jyangra CH Care Hospital, Baguiati^{1}

Rural Hospitals: (Name, block, location, beds)
Madhyamgram Rural Hospital, Madhyamgram, 30 beds
Maslandapur Rural Hospital, Maslandapur, 30 beds
Sabdalpur Rural Hospital, Sabdalpur, 30 beds
Amdanga Rural Hospital, Amdanga, 30 beds
Biswanathpur Rural Hospital, Deganga, 30 beds
Rekjoani Rural Hospital, Rajarhat, 30 beds

Block Primary Health Centres: (Name, block, location, beds)
Chhota Jagulia BPHC, Chhota Jagulia, 15 beds

Primary Health Centres: (CD Block-wise)(CD Block, PHC location, beds)
Habra I CD Block: Rautara PHC (10)
Habra II CD Block: Pukurkona PHC, Bira Ballabhpur (10), Pumlia PHC, Sendanga (6)
Barasat I CD Block: Kadambagachi PHC (10), Duttapukur PHC (6)
Barasat II CD Block: Mitpukuria PHC, Shasan (10), Bagband Siberia (Kemia Kamarpara) PHC, Kirtipur (6)
Amdanga CD Block: Adhata-Joypur PHC, Adhata (6), Marich PHC, Masunda (10), Baraberia PHC (6)
Deganga CD Block: Hadipur-Jhikra PHC, Ajinagar (6), Raypur Chakla PHC, Chakla (10), Kolsur PHC, Deganga (10), Kartickpur (6)
Rajarhat CD Block: Chandpur PHC (Arbelia), Badu (10), Patharghata PHC(10)
Note 1: Bidhannagar Municipal Corporation was formed in 2015 and Rajarhat-Gopalpur Municipality has been part of it and also transferred to Bidhannagar subdivision. Hence all the hospitals in Rajarhat-Gopalpur Municipality are now in Bidhannagar subdivision, not in Barasat Sadar Subdivision.

== Electoral constituencies ==
Lok Sabha (parliamentary) and Vidhan Sabha (state assembly) constituencies in Barasat subdivision were as follows:

Lok Sabha constituency	Reservation	Vidhan Sabha constituency	Reservation	CD Block and/or Gram panchayats and/or municipal areas
Bangaon	Reserved for SC	Gaighata in Bangaon subdivision	Reserved for SC	Gobardanga Municipality, Dharmapur I, Dharmapur II, Ichapur I, Ichapur II, Jaleswar I, Shimulpur and Sutia GPs of Gaighata CD Block, and Bergum I, Bergum II and Machhalandpur I GPs of Habra I CD Block
		Other assembly segments outside Barasat Sadar subdivision		
Basirhat	None	Haroa	None	Falti Beleghata, Dadpur, Kiritipur I, Kiritipur II, Shashan GPs of Barasat II CD Block, Champatala, Deganga I, Deganga II, Hadipur Jhikra II GPs of Deganga CD Block and Gopalpur I, Gopalpur II, Haroa and Khasbalanda GPs of Haroa CD Block
		Other assembly segments outside Barasat Sadar subdivision		
Barasat	None	Habra	None	Habra Municipality, and Kumra, Pritibha, Rautara and Machhalandpur II GPs of Habra I CD Block
		Ashoknagar	None	Ashoknagar Kalyangarh Municipality, and Habra II CD Block
		Rajarhat New Town^{1}	None	Rajarhat-Gopalpur Municipality (now Ward Nos. 1-6 and 10-13 & 27 of Bidhannagar Municipal Corporation) and Rajarhat CD Block
		Madhyamgram	None	Madhyamgram Municipality, Chandipur Rohanda, Kemia Khamarpara GPs of Barasat II CD Block, and Ichhapur Nilganj, Paschim Khilkapur and Purba Khilkapur GPs of Barasat I CD Block
		Barasat	None	Barasat Municipality and Chhoto Jagulia GP of Barasat I CD Block
		Deganga	None	Kadambagachhi and Katra GPs of Barasat I CD Block, and Amulia, Berachampa I, Berachampa II, Chakla, Chaurasi, Hadipur Jhikra I, Kalsur, Nur Nagar and Sohai-Shwetpur GPs of Deganga CD Block
		Other assembly segments outside Barasat Sadar subdivision		
Barrackpore	None	Amdanga	None	Amdanga CD Block, and Dattapukur I, Dattapukur II and Kashimpur GPs of Barasat I CD Block.
		Other assembly segments outside Barasat Sadar subdivision		
Dum Dum	None	Rajrahat Gopalpur^{1}	None	Ward Nos. 6–11,15-19,22-26 of Bidhannagar Municipal Corporation( Before 2015 Rajarhat-Gopalpur Municipality) and Ward Nos.18 and 21 to 27 of South Dum Dum Municipality
		Other assembly segments outside Barasat Sadar subdivision		

Note 1: In 2015, these Vidhan Sabha Constituencies were transferred to Bidhannagar subdivision.
