= Digha, North 24 Parganas =

Digha
- Census Town
- Location in West Bengal, India Digha (India)
- Coordinates: 22.755326°N 88.524742°E
- Country: India
- State: West Bengal
- District: North 24 Parganas

Area
  - Total: 1.40 km^{2} (0.54 sq mi)

Population (2011)
  - Total: 8,159
  - Density: 5,830/km^{2} (15,100/sq mi)

Languages
  - Official: Bengali, English
- Time zone: UTC+5:30 (IST)
- Telephone code: +91 33
- Vehicle registration: WB
- Lok Sabha constituency: Barasat
- Website: north24parganas.nic.in

Digha is a census town in the Barasat I CD block in the Barasat Sadar subdivision in the North 24 Parganas district in the Indian state of West Bengal.

== Geography ==
Cities, towns and locations in Barasat subdivision, North 24 Parganas
M: municipal town, CT: census town, R: rural/ urban centre, H: historical centre
Owing to space constraints in the small map, the actual locations in a larger map may vary slightly

=== Location ===
Digha is located at 22.755326°N 88.524742°E.

Bamangachhi, Digha and Kulberia form a cluster of census towns. The entire cluster has a very high density of population. (See the infobox of each census town for density of population).

Duttapukur police station has jurisdiction over Barasat I CD Block.

=== Area overview ===
The area covered in the map alongside is largely a part of the north Bidyadhari Plain. located in the lower Ganges Delta. The country is flat. It is a little raised above flood level and the highest ground borders the river channels.54.67% of the people of the densely populated area lives in the urban areas and 45.33% lives in the rural areas.

Note: The map alongside presents some of the notable locations in the subdivision. All places marked in the map are linked in the larger full screen map.

== Demographics ==
As of 2011 India census, Digha had a population of 8,159; of this, 4,162 are male, 3,997 female. It has an average literacy rate of 73.2%, lower than the national average of 74.04%.

== Infrastructure ==
As per District Census Handbook 2011, Digha covered an area of 1.3969 km^{2}. It had 2 primary schools, the nearest middle school, secondary school and senior secondary school were 0.5 km away at Sikdarpukuria, and the nearest degree college was 7 km away at Barasat. The nearest dispensary/ health centre (without any bed) was available 1 km away.

== Transport ==
Digha is on National Highway 112 (Jessore Road).

The Duttapukur railway station on the Sealdah-Bangaon line, which is part of the Kolkata Suburban Railway railway system and is located nearby.

== Healthcare ==
There is a primary health centre at Duttapukur.

North 24 Parganas district has been identified as one of the areas where ground water is affected by arsenic contamination.

== See also ==
Map of Barasat I CD Block on Page 393 of District Census Handbook.
