= Chatta Baria =

Chatta Baria Chaltabaria
- Census Town
- Location in West Bengal, India Chatta Baria (India)
- Coordinates: 22.778326°N 88.562542°E
- Country: India
- State: West Bengal
- District: North 24 Parganas

Area
  - Total: 2.34 km^{2} (0.90 sq mi)

Population (2011)
  - Total: 12,537
  - Density: 5,360/km^{2} (13,900/sq mi)

Languages
  - Official: Bengali, English
- Time zone: UTC+5:30 (IST)
- Telephone code: +91 33
- Vehicle registration: WB
- Lok Sabha constituency: Barasat
- Website: north24parganas.nic.in

Chatta Baria (also called Chaltabaria) is a census town in the Barasat I CD block in the Barasat Sadar subdivision in the North 24 Parganas district in the Indian state of West Bengal.

== Geography ==
Cities, towns and locations in Barasat subdivision, North 24 Parganas
M: municipal town, CT: census town, R: rural/ urban centre, H: historical centre
Owing to space constraints in the small map, the actual locations in a larger map may vary slightly

=== Location ===
Chatta Baria is located at 22.778326°N 88.562542°E.

Duttapukur, Shibalaya, Chandrapur, Gangapur, Chatta Baria and Joypul form a cluster of census towns in the northern part of the CD block. The entire cluster has a very high density of population. (See the infobox of each census town for density of population).

Duttapukur police station has jurisdiction over Barasat I CD Block.

=== Area overview ===
The area covered in the map alongside is largely a part of the north Bidyadhari Plain. located in the lower Ganges Delta. The country is flat. It is a little raised above flood level and the highest ground borders the river channels.54.67% of the people of the densely populated area lives in the urban areas and 45.33% lives in the rural areas.

Note: The map alongside presents some of the notable locations in the subdivision. All places marked in the map are linked in the larger full screen map.

== Demographics ==
As of 2011 India census, Chatta Baria had a population of 12,537; of this,6,410 are male, 6,127 female. It has an average literacy rate of 74.26%, higher than the national average of 74.04%.

== Infrastructure ==
As per District Census Handbook 2011, Chatta Baria covered an area of 2.3437 km^{2}. It had 2 primary schools and 1 middle school, the nearest secondary school and senior secondary were 1 km away at Duttapukur, and the nearest degree college is 8 km away at Barasat. Chatta Baria had 2 family welfare centres and 2 maternity and child welfare centres (both without any bed).

== Transport ==
Chatta Baria is beside National Highway 112 (Jessore Road).

Duttapukur railway station and Bira railway station on the Sealdah-Bangaon line, which is part the Kolkata Suburban Railway railway system, are located nearby.

== Healthcare ==
There is a primary health centre at Duttapukur. For other medical facilities in the area see Barasat Sadar subdivision.

North 24 Parganas district has been identified as one of the areas where ground water is affected by arsenic contamination.

== See also ==
Map of Barasat I CD Block on Page 393 of District Census Handbook.
