= Duttapukur blast =

2023 fireworks blast in West Bengal, India

2023 Duttapukur fireworks factory disaster
- Date: 27 August 2023; 3 years ago
- Time: approx 08:00 IST
- Location: Mochpol village, North 24 Parganas, west Bengal, India; 22.7358°N 88.4464°E
- Type: Fireworks disaster
- Deaths: 9
- Injuries: 12

An explosion took place on 27 August 2023 at a firecracker factory at Mochpol village under Duttapukur police station, 6 kilometres (3.7 mi) from Barasat. The factory was on the second floor of a two-storey building, where the explosion and a major fire took place. No exact information was available on how many people were working in the factory at the time of the explosion. The explosion killed 9 people, and injured 12 others.

After the incident, the West Bengal Police started a preliminary investigation. Chief Minister of West Bengal Mamata Banerjee instructed the Chief Secretary of West Bengal on 28 August 2023 to deal with the situation. On behalf of the West Bengal Police were suspended Shubharata Ghosh, IC of Duttapukur, and Himadri Dogra, OC of Nilganj outpost, for dereliction of duty.

== Background ==
According to the local residents, Ajibar Rahman was the owner of this illegal firecracker factory of Mochpol village. He built this factory in a rented house from Shamsul Ali. The business was run by local resident Keramat Ali, who previously run a firecracker factory in Neem Pukuria area. After the 2023 Purba Medinipur blast, police moved to crack down on illegal firecracker factories across the West Bengal, when Keramat was arrested because his firecracker factory at Neem Pukuria did not have a license after 2021. After getting bail, he again started a betting factory in Mochpol village of Duttapukur.

== Explosion ==
According to eyewitnesses, there was a massive explosion in the factory. The first explosion occurred around 8:30 am (local time). The two-storied building collapsed in the blast including the factory. The roof of the factory was torn off by the force of the blast, and the second floor was completely destroyed. Buildings around the factory were damaged.

The entire area was practically turned into rubble as a result of the blast. Factory workers get burnt, and body parts fell on the roofs and yards of neighboring houses a few hundred meters away from the factory.

== Casualties ==
It was not possible to know how many people were present at the time of the explosion. 9 people died due to the explosion at Mochpol village. Two of the dead had succumbed to their injuries. Among the dead were owner of the house and son of the factory owner. After the explosion, the West Bengal Police started searching for the causers. Police arrested one person on August 28, 2023.

== Investigation ==
On August 27, a police search continued throughout the night in Mochpol village; A large quantity of soda powder and banned firecrackers were recovered. Police arrested Safiqul Islam, a partner of the firecracker factory, from Nilganj on 28 August. A total of 4 people have been charged under sections 286, 304, 308, 34, 9B of the Explosives Act and 24/26 Fire Service Act of the Indian Penal Code in connection with the explosion.

Police investigations also found another illegal firecracker factory within a kilometer of the blast site at Duttapukur. A preliminary forensic report indicated that the ignition of a large quantity of 'low-intensity explosives' caused the powerful explosion at Mochpol village of Dattapukur in North 24 Parganas. An investigating officer said that there was a large stockpile of low-intensity explosives, which are normally used in small quantities in making firecrackers, and other raw materials and chemicals in the house unsafely could have led to the massive explosion.

West Bengal's Special Task Force arrested the accused supplying chemicals to the illegal firecrackers factory in Duttapukur outside the Kolkata airport late on 31 August.
