= Koyra =

Koyra may refer to:

- Koyra Chiini language, spoken in Mali
- Koyra language or Koore language, spoken in Ethiopia
- Koyra Upazila, in Khulna District, Bangladesh
- Koyra, West Bengal, a census town in Barasat I CD Block, North 24 Parganas, West Bengal, India.
