= Kulberia =

- Census Town
- Location in West Bengal, India Kulberia (India)
- Coordinates: 22.751543°N 88.517276°E
- Country: India
- State: West Bengal
- District: South 24 Parganas

Area
  - Total: 0.52 km^{2} (0.20 sq mi)

Population (2011)
  - Total: 6,993
  - Density: 13,000/km^{2} (35,000/sq mi)

Languages
  - Official: Bengali, English
- Time zone: UTC+5:30 (IST)
- Telephone code: +91 33
- Vehicle registration: WB
- Lok Sabha constituency: Jadavpur
- Vidhan Sabha constituency: Bhangar
- Website: www s24ps.gov.in

Kulberia is a census town in the Bhangar II CD block in the Baruipur subdivision in the South 24 Parganas district in the Indian state of West Bengal. It is a part of Kolkata Urban Agglomeration.

== Geography ==
Cities, towns and locations in Barasat subdivision, North 24 Parganas
M: municipal town, CT: census town, R: rural/ urban centre, H: historical centre
Owing to space constraints in the small map, the actual locations in a larger map may vary slightly

=== Location ===
Kulberia is located at 22.751543°N 88.517276°E.

Bamangachhi, Digha and Kulberia form a cluster of census towns. The entire cluster has a very high density of population. (See the infobox of each census town for density of population).

Duttapukur police station has jurisdiction over Barasat I CD Block.

=== Area overview ===
The area covered in the map alongside is largely a part of the north Bidyadhari Plain, located in the lower Ganges Delta. The country is flat. It is a little raised above flood level and the highest ground borders the river channels.54.67% of the people of the densely populated area live in the urban areas and 45.33% live in the rural areas.

Note: The map alongside presents some of the notable locations in the subdivision. All places marked in the map are linked in the larger full screen map.

== Demographics ==
As of 2011 India census, Kulberia had a population of 6,993; of this, 3,543 are male, 3,450 female. It has an average literacy rate of 81.15%, higher than the national average of 74.04%.

== Infrastructure ==
As per District Census Handbook 2011, Kulberia covered an area of 0.5227 km^{2} (0.2018 sq mi). It had one primary school; the nearest middle school was 5 km (3.1 mi) away at Tentulia; the nearest secondary school and senior secondary school were 1.5 km (0.93 mi) away at Mondalganth. The nearest dispensary/ health centre (without any bed) was available 1 km (0.62 mi) away.

== Transport ==
Local roads link Kulberia to Chhota Jagulia on National Highway 112 (Jessore Road).

The Bamangachhi railway station on the Sealdah-Bangaon line, which is part of the Kolkata Suburban Railway railway system, is located nearby.

== Healthcare ==
South 24 Parganas district has been identified as one of the areas where ground water is affected by arsenic contamination.

== See also ==
Map of Bhangar II CD Block on Page 393 of District Census Handbook.
