= NH 112 =

NH 112 may refer to:

- National Highway 112 (India)
- New Hampshire Route 112, United States
