= Koyra, West Bengal =

Koyra
- Census Town
- Location in West Bengal, India Koyra (India)
- Coordinates: 22.706176°N 88.541103°E
- Country: India
- State: West Bengal
- District: North 24 Parganas

Area
  - Total: 1.57 km^{2} (0.61 sq mi)

Population (2011)
  - Total: 11,615
  - Density: 7,400/km^{2} (19,200/sq mi)

Languages
  - Official: Bengali, English
- Time zone: UTC+5:30 (IST)
- PIN: 700125
- Telephone code: +91 33
- ISO 3166 code: IN-WB
- Vehicle registration: WB
- Lok Sabha constituency: Barasat
- Website: north24parganas.nic.in

Koyra is a census town in the Barasat I CD block in the Barasat Sadar subdivision in the North 24 Parganas district in the Indian state of West Bengal.

== Geography ==
Cities, towns and locations in Barasat subdivision, North 24 Parganas
M: municipal town, CT: census town, R: rural/ urban centre, H: historical centre
Owing to space constraints in the small map, the actual locations in a larger map may vary slightly

=== Location ===
Koyra is located at 22.706176°N 88.541103°E'

Duttapukur police station has jurisdiction over Barasat I CD block.

=== Area overview ===
The area covered in the map alongside is largely a part of the north Bidyadhari Plain. located in the lower Ganges Delta. The country is flat. It is a little raised above flood level and the highest ground borders the river channels. 54.67% of the people of the densely populated area lives in the urban areas and 45.33% lives in the rural areas.

Note: The map alongside presents some of the notable locations in the subdivision. All places marked in the map are linked in the larger full screen map.

== Demographics ==
As of 2011 India census, Koyra had a population of 11,615; of this, 5,789 are male, 5,826 female. It has an average literacy rate of 68.72%, lower than the national average of 74.04%.

== Infrastructure ==
As per the District Census Handbook 2011, Koyra covered an area of 1.5657 km^{2}. It had 6 primary schools, 2 secondary schools and 2 senior secondary schools. The nearest hospital was available 4 km away, the nearest dispensary/ health centre (without any beds) 1 km away, the nearest family welfare centre 8 km away, the nearest maternity and child welfare centre 8 km away and the nearest maternity home 8 km away.

== Transport ==
Karea Kadambagachhi railway station is on the Barasat-Hasnabad line, which is part the Kolkata Suburban Railway railway system.

Koyra is beside the State Highway 2 (locally known as Taki Road).

== Healthcare ==
North 24 Parganas district has been identified as one of the areas where ground water is affected by arsenic contamination.

== See also ==
Map of Barasat I CD Block on Page 393 of District Census Handbook.
