= Amdanga, North 24 Parganas =

Amdanga
- Town
- Location in West Bengal, India Amdanga (India)
- Coordinates: 22.805256°N 88.506543°E
- Country: India
- State: West Bengal
- District: North 24 Parganas

Population (2011)
  - Total: 3,855

Languages
  - Official: Bengali, English
- Time zone: UTC+5:30 (IST)
- PIN: 743221 (Arkhali Amdanga)
- Telephone/STD code: 03217
- Lok Sabha constituency: Barrackpore
- Vidhan Sabha constituency: Amdanga
- Website: north24parganas.nic.in

Amdanga is a Census Town and a panchayat in the Amdanga CD block in the Barasat Sadar subdivision of the North 24 Parganas district in the state of West Bengal, India.

== Geography ==
Cities, towns and locations in Barasat subdivision, North 24 Parganas
M: municipal town, CT: census town, R: rural/ urban centre, H: historical centre
Owing to space constraints in the small map, the actual locations in a larger map may vary slightly

=== Location ===
Amdanga is located at 22.805256°N 88.506543°E.

=== Area overview ===
The area covered in the map alongside is largely a part of the north Bidyadhari Plain. located in the lower Ganges Delta. The country is flat. It is a little raised above flood level and the highest ground borders the river channels. 54.67% of the people of the densely populated area lives in the urban areas and 45.33% lives in the rural areas.

Note: The map alongside presents some of the notable locations in the subdivision. All places marked in the map are linked in the larger full screen map.

== Civic administration ==
=== Police station ===
Amdanga police station covers an area of 138.8 km^{2} and serves a total population of 139,328. It has jurisdiction over Amdanga CD Block.

=== CD block HQ ===
The headquarters of Amdanga CD block are located at Amdanga village.

== Demographics ==
According to the 2011 Census of India, Amdanga had a total population of 3,855, of which 1,989 (52%) were males and 1,866 (48%) were females. Population in the age range 0–6 years was 430. The total number of literate persons in Amdanga was 2,720 (79.42% of the population over 6 years).

== Transport ==
National Highway 12 (old numbering NH 34) passes through Amdanga.

== Healthcare ==
Amdanga Rural Hospital with 30 beds functions as the main medical facility in Amdanga CD block. There are primary health centres at Adhata (Adhata-Joypur PHC with 6 beds), Masunda (Marich PHC with 10 beds) and Baraberia PHC (with 6 beds).

== See also ==
Map of Amdanga CD Block on Page 339 of District Census Handbook.
