= Dhania, West Bengal =

Dhania
- Census Town
- Location in West Bengal, India Dhania (India)
- Coordinates: 22.911256°N 88.534543°E
- Country: India
- State: West Bengal
- District: North 24 Parganas

Area
  - Total: 3.65 km^{2} (1.41 sq mi)

Population (2011)
  - Total: 6,659
  - Density: 1,820/km^{2} (4,730/sq mi)

Languages
  - Official: Bengali, English
- Time zone: UTC+5:30 (IST)
- ISO 3166 code: IN-WB
- Vehicle registration: WB
- Lok Sabha constituency: Barasat
- Website: north24parganas.nic.in

Dhania is a census town in the Amdanga CD block in the Barasat Sadar subdivision in the North 24 Parganas district in the Indian state of West Bengal.

== Geography ==
Cities, towns and locations in Barasat subdivision, North 24 Parganas
M: municipal town, CT: census town, R: rural/ urban centre, H: historical centre
Owing to space constraints in the small map, the actual locations in a larger map may vary slightly

=== Location ===
Dhania is located at 22.911256°N 88.534543°E.

=== Area overview ===
The area covered in the map alongside is largely a part of the north Bidyadhari Plain, located in the lower Ganges Delta. The country is flat. It is a little raised above flood level and the highest ground borders the river channels. 54.67% of the people of the densely populated area live in the urban areas and 45.33% live in the rural areas.

Note: The map alongside presents some of the notable locations in the subdivision. All places marked in the map are linked in the larger full screen map.

== Demographics ==
As of 2011 India census, Dhania had a population of 6659; of this, 3403 are male, 3256 female. Dhania has an average literacy rate of 81%, higher than the national average of 74.04%.

== Transport ==
National Highway 12 (old numbering NH 34) passes through Dhania.

== Infrastructure ==
As per District Census Handbook 2011, Dhania covered an area of 3.6511 km^{2}. It had 1 primary school. The nearest hospital was 6 km away, the nearest dispensary/ health centre was 4 km away, the nearest family welfare centre was 6 km away, the nearest maternity and child welfare clinic was 7 km away and the nearest maternity home was 6 km away.

== Healthcare ==
North 24 Parganas district has been identified as one of the areas where ground water is affected by arsenic contamination.

== See also ==
Map of Amdanga CD Block on Page 339 of District Census Handbook.
