= Bamangachhi =

- Village
- Location in West Bengal, India Bamangachhi (India)
- Coordinates: 22.74°N 88.51°E
- Country: India
- State: West Bengal
- District: North 24 Parganas

Area
  - Total: 1.36 km^{2} (0.53 sq mi)

Population (2011)
  - Total: 6,824
  - Density: 5,020/km^{2} (13,000/sq mi)

Languages
  - Official: Bengali, English
- Time zone: UTC+5:30 (IST)
- PIN: 743248
- Telephone code: +91 33
- Vehicle registration: WB
- Lok Sabha constituency: Barasat
- Vidhan Sabha constituency: Barasat
- Website: north24parganas.nic.in

Bamangachhi is a Village in the Barasat I CD block in the Barasat Sadar subdivision of the North 24 Parganas district in the state of West Bengal, India.

== Demographics ==
As per the 2011 Census of India, Bamangachhi had a total population of 6,824, of which 3,468 (51%) were males and 3,356 (49%) were females. Population below 6 years was 557. The total number of literates in Bamangachhi was 5,554 (88.62% of the population over 6 years).

== Etymology ==
The exact reason to be named as Bamangachhi is not known, but according to local lore, it may have been derived the name "bamun para" (literally meaning the neighbourhood of Brahmins), which is an old Brahmin-predominant locality of here.

== Geography ==
Cities, towns and locations in Barasat subdivision, North 24 Parganas
M: municipal town, CT: census town, R: rural/ urban centre, H: historical centre
Owing to space constraints in the small map, the actual locations in a larger map may vary slightly

=== Location ===
Bamangachhi is located at 22.74°N 88.51°E.

Bamangachi, Digha and Kulberia form a cluster of census towns. Mondalganth Natun para observes a prayer day on Saturday at the temple located nearby. The entire cluster has a high density of population.

Duttapukur police station has jurisdiction over Barasat I CD Block.

=== Climate ===
The climate of Bamangachhi is tropical, like the rest of the Gangetic West Bengal. The hallmark is the Monsoon, which lasts from early June to mid September. The weather remains dry during the winter (mid November to mid February) and humid during summer.

=== Area overview ===
The area covered in the map alongside is largely a part of the north Bidyadhari Plain. located in the lower Ganges Delta. The country is flat. It is a little raised above flood level and the highest ground borders the river channels. 54.67% of the people of the densely populated area lives in the urban areas and 45.33% lives in the rural areas.

Note: The map alongside presents some of the notable locations in the subdivision. All places marked in the map are linked in the larger full screen map.

== Economy ==
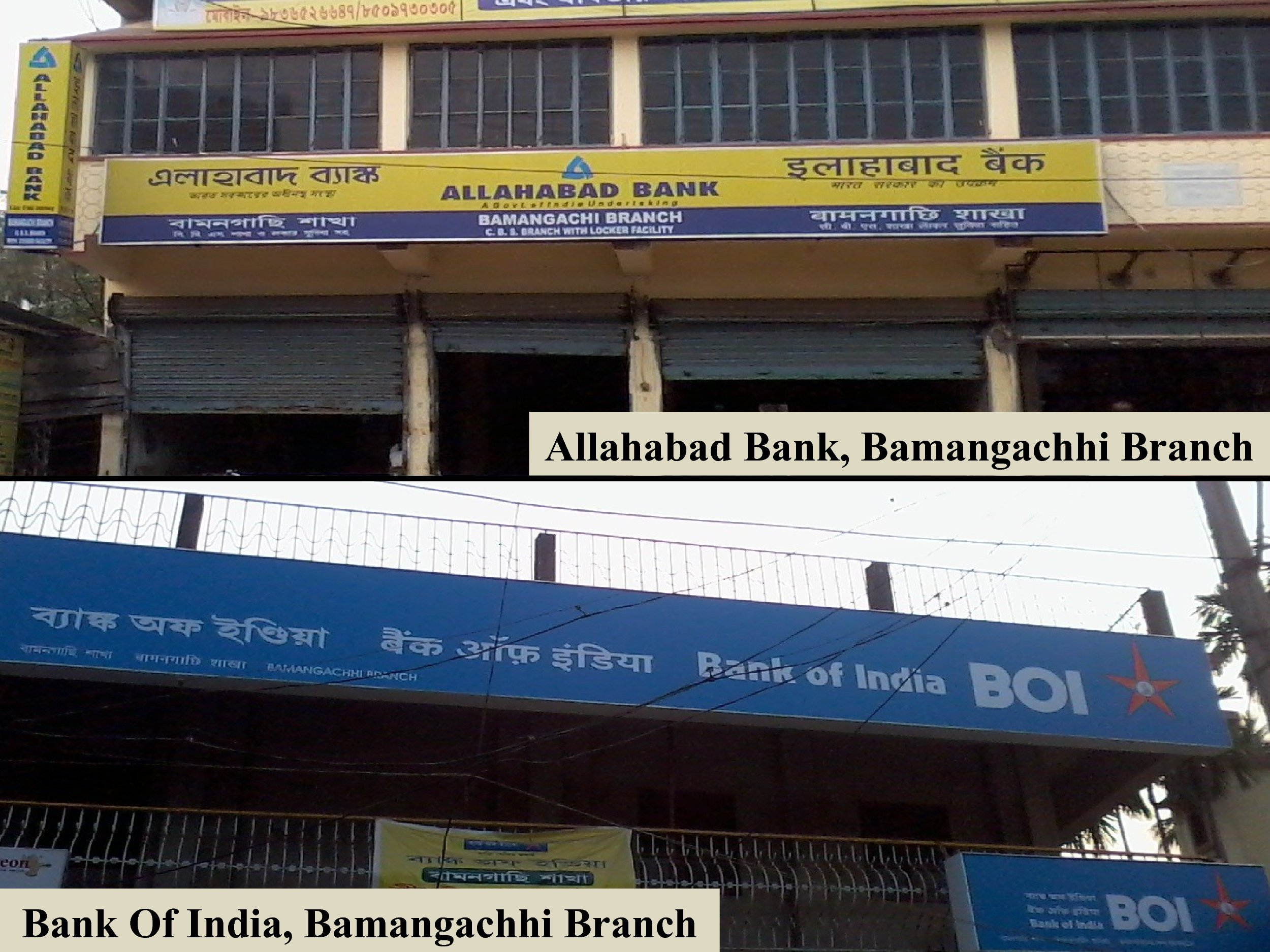
Banks in Bamangachhi

Occupations for most of the people in Bamangachhi Town is service or business. A large number of people lives in Chhota Jagulia Gram Panchayat . The people from the villages like Maliakur, Bahera, Sankargachhi, Boropole, Nityananda Sarani, Marait, Murali are mostly involved in agriculture and allied activities. Most of the people of Bamangachhi belong to middle class economy. A large number of people are poor.

=== Regent Garment and Apparel Park, Murali, Bamangachhi ===
RDB Industries is setting up a mega garment and apparel park at Murali, Bamangachhi. The entire park is expected to cover 120 acres of land (approximately) beside Jessore Road near Bamangachhi Chowmatha. IIS is designing and managing the execution of the Infrastructure for the Park. The company is investing Rs 4 billion for setting up the park in phased manner. The phase I is under construction with 18 blocks, one Guest House and a Commercial Block. The Phase I will be able to accommodate close to 200 units. The infrastructure consists of state of the art road network with separate storm water & sewer lines. Environment friendly STP, Rain Water Harvesting and Water Treatment minimising discharge. The entire park is expected to be completed by 2018. On completion, the park will be able to house around 1,000 manufacturing units.

== Infrastructure ==
As per District Census Handbook 2011, Bamangachhi covered an area of 1.3599 km^{2}. It had 5 primary schools, the nearest middle school was 6 km away at Tentulia, the nearest secondary school and senior secondary schools were 1.5 km away at Mondalganth.

== Transport ==
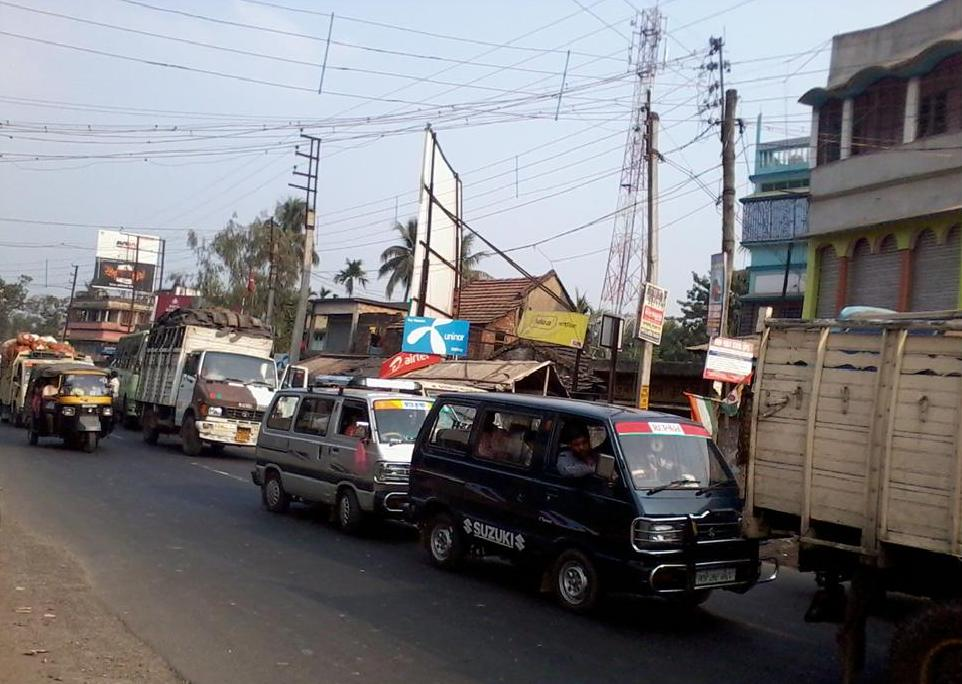
NH-35 @ Bamangachhi

Bamangachhi is approximately 26 kilometres (16 mi) from Kolkata, and 4 kilometres (2.5 mi) from North 24 Pargana's district headquarters Barasat. It is well connected by rail and roads with the major destinations in North 24 Parganas and Kolkata. The Bamangachhi railway station is a part of Kolkata Suburban Railway under the Sealdah-Bongaon division. The station had been upgraded as the Adarsh Railway Station (model railway station) by the former Railway Minister Mamata Banerjee in the Railway Budget 2011–12 (Upgradation of Bamangachhi Railway Station will provide safe drinking water, pay & use toilets, high-level platforms, better accessibility for the physically challenged among many other facilities at the station.).

Bamangachhi is situated between the two major National Highways, NH-34 and NH-35 (Jessore Road). The National Highway 34 connects Kolkata to Siliguri (in North Bengal) and National Highway 35 connects Kolkata to Jessore, a city in Bangladesh. Bamangachhi is about 16 kilometres (9.9 mi) away from the Netaji Subhas Chandra Bose International Airport, Kolkata and 26 kilometres (16 mi) from Sealdah Railway Station. A major P.W.D. Road, which is known as Bamangachhi-Bamunmura Road has passed across the town and connects Taki Road, NH 35, Bamangachhi Station and NH 34. The other main roads which connects the localities inside Bamangachhi are Station Road, Kashimpur Road, Post Office Road, Nityananda Sarani, B.D.Office Road, Suripukur Road etc.

The former RAF Baigachi was nearby and the following units were deployed there:

- No. 5 Squadron RAF
- No. 11 Squadron RAF
- No. 30 Squadron RAF
- No. 34 Squadron RAF
- No. 60 Squadron RAF
- No. 67 Squadron RAF
- No. 81 Squadron RAF
- No. 84 Squadron RAF
- No. 89 Squadron RAF
- No. 123 Squadron RAF
- No. 131 Squadron RAF
- No. 134 Squadron RAF
- No. 136 Squadron RAF
- No. 146 Squadron RAF
- No. 152 Squadron RAF
- No. 155 Squadron RAF
- No. 176 Squadron RAF
- No. 258 Squadron RAF
- No. 261 Squadron RAF
- No. 607 Squadron RAF
- No. 615 Squadron RAF
- Air Headquarters Burma Communication Squadron RAF was formed here
- Headquarters Royal Air Force Burma Communication Squadron RAF was formed here
- Royal Air Force Bengal/Burma Communication Squadron RAF was formed here

== Education ==
=== High school ===
- Bamangachhi Bholanath High School
- Chhota Jagulia High School
- Bamangachhi Sarada Ramakrishna Missionary School.
- Kalyani Public School, Moina Godi
- Kashimpur High School
- Kashimpur Girl's High School
- Jafrabad High School

=== Madrasah ===
- Tentulia Abujafiria Siddiquia Kharejia Madrasah.

== Culture ==
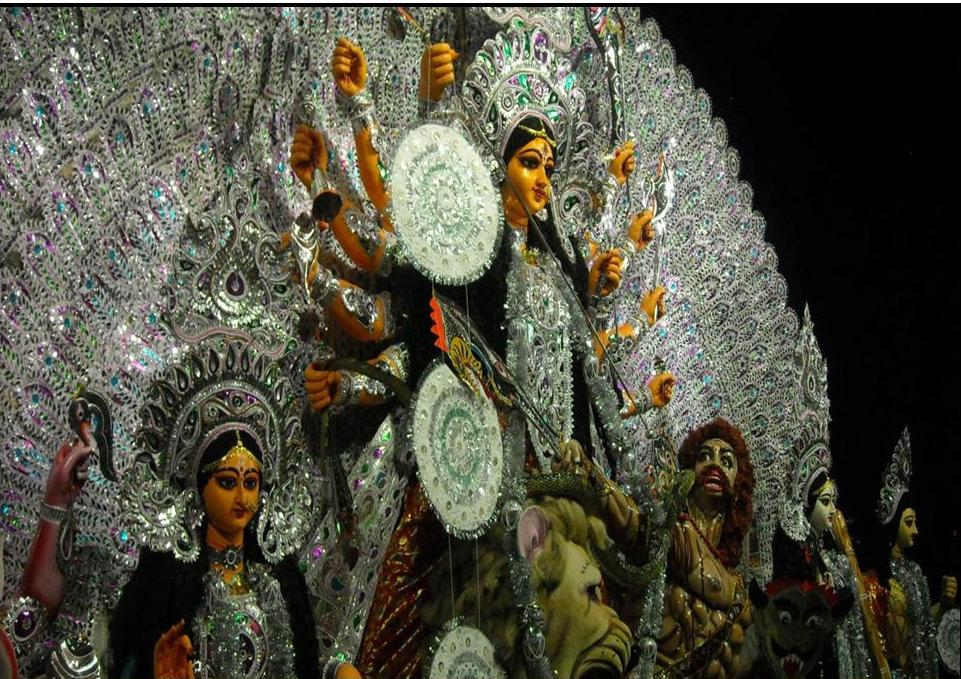
50th year Durga Puja celebration by Agrani Sangha, Bamangachhi

As in most parts of West Bengal, the major festivals in Bamangachhi are New Year, Republic & Independence Day, Durgapuja, Diwali, Kalipuja, Laxmipuja, Eid–Uz–Zuha, Christmas.

== See also ==
- Barasat I CD Block
- Map of Barasat I CD Block on Page 393 of District Census Handbook.
