= Amdanga =

- Town
- Interactive map of Amdanga
- Coordinates: 22°48′20″N 88°30′30″E
- Country: India
- State: West Bengal
- District: North 24 Parganas

Government
  - Type: Representative democracy

Area
  - Total: 139.27 km^{2} (53.77 sq mi)
- Elevation: 13 m (43 ft)

Population (2011)
  - Total: 191,673
  - Density: 1,376.3/km^{2} (3,564.5/sq mi)

Languages
  - Official: Bengali, English

Literacy (2011)
  - Total literates: 136,350 (80.69%)
- Time zone: UTC+5:30 (IST)
- PIN: 743221 (Arkhali Amdanga)
- Telephone code: 91 3216
- ISO 3166 code: IN-WB
- Vehicle registration: WB-23, WB-24, WB-25, WB-26
- Lok Sabha constituency: Barrackpore
- Vidhan Sabha constituency: Amdanga
- Website: north24parganas.gov.in/n24p/index.php

Amdanga is a Town in North 24 Parganas district in the Indian state of West Bengal.

== Geography ==
Amdanga, the eponymous CD Block headquarters, is located at 22°48′20″N 88°30′30″E.

Amdanga CD Block is bounded by Haringhata CD Block in Nadia district in the north, Habra II CD Block in the east, Barasat I CD Block in the south, and Barrackpore I and Barrackpore II CD Blocks in the west.

Amdanga CD Block is part of the North Hooghly Flat, one of the three physiographic regions in the district located in the lower Ganges Delta. It is a raised alluvium area along the Hooghly, which forms the western boundary of the district.

Amdanga CD Block has an area of 139.27 km^{2}. It has 1 panchayat samity, 8 gram panchayats, 117 gram sansads, 81 mouzas, as per the District Statistical Handbook: North 24 Parganas. Amdanga police station serves this block. Headquarters of this CD Block is at Amdanga.

panchayats in Amdanga CD Block are: Adhata, Bodai, Maricha, Amdanga, Chandigarh, Sadhanpur, Beraberia and Taraberia.

== Demographics ==
=== Population ===
As per 2011 Census of India Amdanga CD Block had a total population of 191,673, of which 185,054 were rural and 6,659 were urban. There were 98,618 (51%) males and 93,055 (49%) females. Population below 6 years was 19,756. Scheduled Castes numbered 34,810 (18.16%) and Scheduled Tribes numbered 2,876 (1.50%).

Amdanga (village) had a population of 3,855 in 2011.

In the 2001 census, Amdanga community development block had a total population of 165, 771, out of which 85, 826 were males and 79,943 were females.

There is only one census town in Amdanga CD Block (2011 census figure in brackets): Dhania (6,659).

Large Town in Amdanga CD Block were (2011 census figures in brackets): Adhata (4,883), Sikra (4,194), Dariapur (5,748), Dangatanga Tangi (5,657), Bodai (6,971), Arkhali (4,033) and Beraberia (8,969).

North 24 Parganas district is densely populated, mainly because of the influx of refugees from East Pakistan (later Bangladesh). With a density of population of 2,182 per km^{2} in 1971, it was 3rd in terms of density per km^{2} in West Bengal after Kolkata and Howrah, and 20th in India. According to the District Human Development Report: North 24 Parganas, “High density is also explained partly by the rapid growth of urbanization in the district. In 1991, the percentage of urban population in the district has been 51.23.”

Decadal Population Growth Rate (%)

The decadal growth of population in Amdanga CD Block in 2001-2011 was 15.61%. The decadal growth of population in Amdanga CD Block in 1991-2001 was 19.28%.

The decadal growth rate of population in North 24 Parganas district was as follows: 47.9% in 1951-61, 34.5% in 1961-71, 31.4% in 1971-81, 31.7% in 1981-91, 22.7% in 1991-2001 and 12.0% in 2001-11. The decadal growth rate for West Bengal in 2001-11 was 13.93%. The decadal growth rate for West Bengal was 17.84% in 1991-2001, 24.73% in 1981-1991 and 23.17% in 1971-1981.

Only a small portion of the border with Bangladesh has been fenced and it is popularly referred to as a porous border. It is freely used by Bangladeshi infiltrators, terrorists, smugglers, criminals et al.

=== Literacy ===
As per the 2011 census, the total number of literates in Amdanga CD Block was 136,350 (80.69% of the population over 6 years) out of which males numbered 73,244 (84.09% of the male population over 6 years) and females numbered 63,106 (77.07% of the female population over 6 years). The gender disparity (the difference between female and male literacy rates) was 7.02%.

See also – List of West Bengal districts ranked by literacy rate

Literacy in CD blocks of
North 24 Parganas district
Barasat Sadar subdivision
Amdanga – 80.69%
Deganga – 79.65%
Barasat I – 81.50%
Barasat II – 77.71%
Habra I – 83.15%
Habra II – 81.05%
Rajarhat – 83.13%
Basirhat subdivision
Baduria – 78.75%
Basirhat I – 72.10%
Basirhat II – 78.30%
Haroa – 73.13%
Hasnabad – 71.47%
Hingalganj – 76.85%
Minakhan – 71.33%
Sandeshkhali I – 71.08%
Sandeshkhali II – 70.96%
Swarupnagar – 77.57%
Bangaon subdivision
Bagdah – 75.30%
Bangaon – 79.71%
Gaighata – 82.32%
Barrackpore subdivision
Barrackpore I – 85.91%
Barrackpore II – 84.53%
Source: 2011 Census: CD Block Wise
Primary Census Abstract Data

=== Language and religion ===
Religion in Amdanga CD block (2011)
Islam	58.48%
Hinduism	41.30%
Other or not stated	0.22%

In the 2011 census Muslims numbered 112,093 and formed 58.48% of the population in Amdanga CD Block. Hindus numbered 79,159 and formed 41.30% of the population. Others numbered 421 and formed 0.22% of the population.

In 1981 Muslims numbered 54,630 and formed 51.69% of the population and Hindus numbered 51,050 and formed 48.20% of the population. In 1991 Muslims numbered 75,360 and formed 54.21% of the population and Hindus numbered 63,545 and formed 45.72% of the population in Amdanga CD Block. (In 1981 and 1991 census was conducted as per jurisdiction of the police station). In 2001, Hindus numbered 72,687 (43.84%) and Muslims 92,837 (56.00%).

Bengali is the predominant language, spoken by 98.94% of the population.

== Rural poverty ==
33.05% of households in Amdanga CD Block lived below poverty line in 2001, against an average of 29.28% in North 24 Parganas district.

== Economy ==
=== Livelihood ===
Livelihood
in Amdanga CD Block
1. Cultivators (19.4%)
2. Agricultural labourers (35.6%)
3. Household industries (2.74%)
4. Other Workers (42.2%)

In Amdanga CD Block in 2011, amongst the class of total workers, cultivators numbered 13,543 and formed 19.42% of the total workers, agricultural labourers numbered 24,815 and formed 35.59%, household industry workers numbered 1,910 and formed 2.74% and other workers numbered 29,453 and formed 42.24%. Total workers numbered 69,721 and formed 36.37% of the total population, and non-workers numbered 121,952 and formed 63.63% of the population.

In more than 30 percent of the villages in North 24 Parganas, agriculture or household industry is no longer the major source of livelihood for the main workers there. The CD Blocks in the district can be classified as belonging to three categories: border areas, Sundarbans area and other rural areas. The percentage of other workers in the other rural areas category is considerably higher than those in the border areas and Sundarbans area.

Note: In the census records a person is considered a cultivator, if the person is engaged in cultivation/ supervision of land owned by self/government/institution. When a person who works on another person’s land for wages in cash or kind or share, is regarded as an agricultural labourer. Household industry is defined as an industry conducted by one or more members of the family within the household or village, and one that does not qualify for registration as a factory under the Factories Act. Other workers are persons engaged in some economic activity other than cultivators, agricultural labourers and household workers. It includes factory, mining, plantation, transport and office workers, those engaged in business and commerce, teachers, entertainment artistes and so on.

=== Infrastructure ===
There are 79 inhabited villages in Amdanga CD Block, as per the District Census Handbook: North 24 Parganas. 100% villages have power supply and drinking water supply. 16 villages (20.25%) have post offices. 79 villages (100%) have telephones (including landlines, public call offices and mobile phones). 52 villages (65.82%) have a pucca approach road and 38 villages (48.10%) have transport communication (includes bus service, rail facility and navigable waterways). 8 villages (10.13%) have agricultural credit societies and 10 villages (12.66 ) have banks.

=== Agriculture ===
The North 24 Parganas district Human Development Report opines that in spite of agricultural productivity in North 24 Parganas district being rather impressive 81.84% of rural population suffered from shortage of food. With a high urbanisation of 54.3% in 2001, the land use pattern in the district is changing quite fast and the area under cultivation is declining. However, agriculture is still the major source of livelihood in the rural areas of the district.

From 1977 on wards major land reforms took place in West Bengal. Land in excess of land ceiling was acquired and distributed amongst the peasants. Following land reforms land ownership pattern has undergone transformation. In 2010-11, persons engaged in agriculture in Amdanga CD Block could be classified as follows: bargadars 1,872 (4.77%), patta (document) holders 2,270 (5.78%), small farmers (possessing land between 1 and 2 hectares) 1,960 (4.99%), marginal farmers (possessing land up to 1 hectare) 17,080 (43.49%) and agricultural labourers 16,093 (40.98%).

Amdanga CD Block had 228 fertiliser depots, 129 seed stores and 33 fair price shops in 2010-11.

In 2010-11, Amdanga CD Block produced 17,609 tonnes of Aman paddy, the main winter crop from 7,286 hectares, 20,993 tonnes of Boro paddy (spring crop) from 6,605 hectares, 2,582 tonnes of Aus paddy (summer crop) from 1,193 hectares, 60,159 tonnes of jute from 3,992 hectares, 10,876 tonnes of potatoes from 370 hectares and 18,511 tonnes of sugar cane from 228 hectares. It also produced pulses and oilseeds.

In 2010-11, the total area irrigated in Amdanga CD Block was 536 hectares, all of which were irrigated by deep tube well.

=== Pisciculture ===
In 2010-11, the net area under effective pisciculture in Amdanga CD Block was 909.79 hectares. 17,430 persons were engaged in the profession. Approximate annual production was 27,293.7 quintals.

=== Banking ===
In 2010-11, Amdanga CD Block had offices of 10 commercial banks and 3 gramin banks.

== Transport ==
The nearest railway station is 11 km from CD Block headquarters.

NH 12 (old numbering NH 34) passes through this CD Block.

== Education ==
In 2010-11, Amdanga CD Block had 82 primary schools with 11,407 students, 3 middle schools with 561 students, 5 high schools with 4,149 students and 12 higher secondary schools with 17,724 students. Amdanga CD Block had 1 general college with 247 students and 246 institutions for special and non-formal education with 12,126 students.

As per the 2011 census, in Amdanga CD Block, amongst the 79 inhabited villages, 2 villages did not have a school, 25 villages had more than 1 primary school, 24 villages had at least 1 primary and 1 middle school and 13 villages had at least 1 middle and 1 secondary school.

Amdanga Jugal Kishore Mahavidyalaya was established at Sadhanpur in 2007.

== Healthcare ==
In 2011, Amdanga CD Block had 1 block primary health centre and 3 primary health centres, with total 15 beds and 5 doctors (excluding private bodies). It had 25 family welfare subcentres. 1,814 patients were treated indoors and 72,521 patients were treated outdoor in the hospitals, health centres and subcentres of the CD Block.

Amdanga Rural Hospital at Amdanga with 30 beds functions as the main medical facility in Amdanga CD Block. There are primary health centres at Adhata (Adhata-Joypur PHC with 6 beds), Masunda (Marich PHC with 10 beds) and Baraberia (with 6 beds).

Amdanga is one of the areas where ground water is affected by arsenic contamination.
