= Bamangachhi railway station =

Railway station in West Bengal, India

Bamangachhi
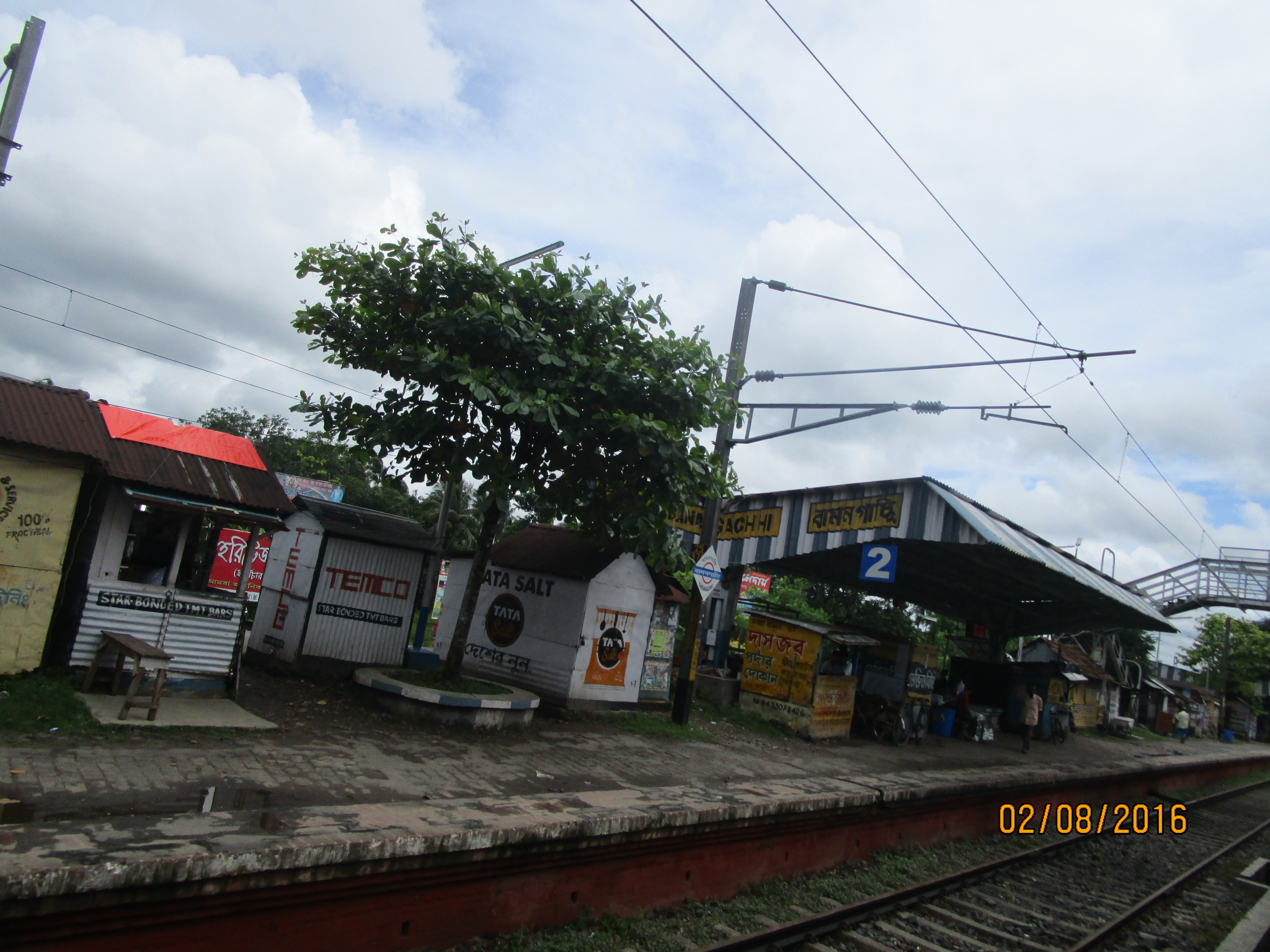

General information
- Location: Bamangachhi, North 24 Parganas district, West Bengal; India
- Coordinates: 22.748797°N 88.509769°E
- Elevation: 9 metres (30 ft)
- System: Kolkata Suburban Railway
- Owner: Indian Railways
- Operator: Eastern Railway
- Line: Sealdah–Hasnabad–Bangaon–Ranaghat line of Kolkata Suburban Railway
- Platforms: 3
- Tracks: 3

Construction
- Structure type: At grade
- Parking: No
- Cycle facilities: No

Other information
- Status: Active
- Station code: BMG
- Zone(s): Eastern Railway
- Division(s): Sealdah

History
- Opened: 1906; 120 years ago
- Electrified: 1972; 54 years ago

Services
Preceding station	Kolkata Suburban Railway	Following station
Barasat Junction towards Sealdah	Eastern Line Dum Dum–Bangaon branch line	Duttapukur towards Bangaon Junction
Route map
Location
- Location within West Bengal Location within India

Bamangachhi railway station is a small railway station in North 24 Parganas district, West Bengal. Its code is BMG. It serves Bamangachhi town and its surrounding areas. It lies between the Duttapukur railway station and the Barasat Junction railway station.

== Station Complex ==
The infrastructure of the station is terrestrial. This station has 3 platforms. Bamangachi railway station has 3 railway lines or railtracks. Passengers are issued tickets from the platform no.1. in the station ticket office for rail travel.

The station has seating, platform canopies, drinking water facilities for passenger convenience. There is no parking facility at the station.

== Rail Service ==
This station provides rail services to its surrounding area of the station. Trains approach for Bangaon, Sealdah, Barasat and Majerhat run through this station. Local trains of Kolkata Suburban Railway serve rail passengers daily at this station.

== History ==
Bamangachhi is located on Sealdah–Hasnabad–Bangaon–Ranaghat line of Kolkata Suburban Railway. Link between Dum Dum to Khulna now in Bangladesh, via Bangaon was constructed by Bengal Central Railway Company in 1882–84.

== Railway ==
Bamangachi railway station is located on the Sealdah - Bangaon railway line that stretches between Kolkata district and North 24 Parganas district. This railway consists of 4 rail lines or rail tracks from Sealdah to Dum Dum and the other 2 from Dum Dum to Bangaon.

== Electrification ==
Bamangachi railway station has electric trains running on the tracks. Electrification of this railway was completed in 1972.

== Securities ==
Belgharia railway station belongs to Sealdah Railway Division of Eastern Railway Zone of Indian Railways. All the responsibilities of station management are given on the head of the station "Station Master". Apart from this, temporary mobile GRP personnel are employed for the security of the station and its premises. The security of station adjoining areas is provided by the local police administration.

== See also ==
- North 24 Parganas district
- Indian Railways
- Sealdah
- Sealdah–Hasnabad–Bangaon–Ranaghat line
- Bangaon Junction
- Transport in West Bengal
- List of railway stations in India
