= Barasat Junction railway station =

Railway station in West Bengal, India

Barasat Junction
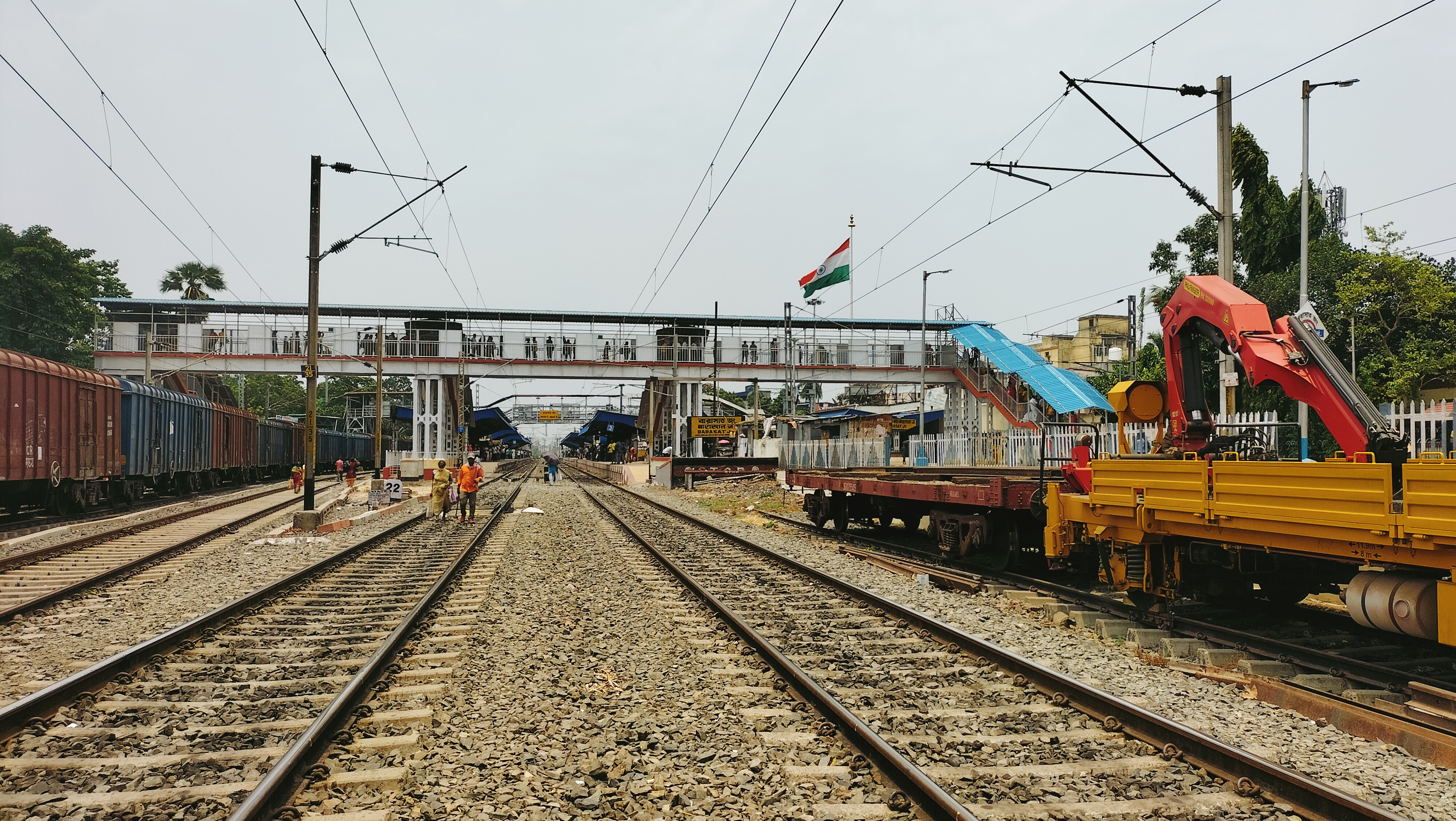
- Barasat Junction railway station

General information
- Location: Barasat, North 24 Parganas, West Bengal; India
- Coordinates: 22.723940°N 88.483665°E
- Elevation: 12 metres (39 ft)
- System: Kolkata Suburban Railway
- Owner: Indian Railways
- Operator: Eastern Railway
- Platforms: 6(A1,1,2,3,4,5)
- Tracks: 6

Construction
- Structure type: At grade
- Parking: Not available

Other information
- Status: Active
- Station code: BT
- Zone(s): Eastern Railway
- Division(s): Sealdah

History
- Opened: 1906; 120 years ago
- Electrified: 1972; 54 years ago

Services
Preceding station	Kolkata Suburban Railway	Following station
Hridaypur towards Sealdah	Eastern Line Dum Dum–Bangaon branch line	Bamangachhi towards Bangaon Junction
Hridaypur towards Sealdah	Eastern Line Dum Dum–Bangaon branch line	Kazipara towards Hasnabad
Route map
Location
- Location within West Bengal Location within India

Barasat Berachampa Junction is a Kolkata Suburban Railway station in Barasat. It is one of the minor suburban railway stations in North 24 Parganas district, West Bengal, India. Generally, people commuting daily use this station for travelling to Kolkata's Central Business District or Bashirhat , with the busiest times at the station being the morning and evening peak periods. This station provides the facility of separate rest rooms for both male & female passengers. Barasat Junction Railway station consists of 6 permanent platforms (Platform no: 1–6).

== Station complex ==
A reservation counter for booking long-distance railway tickets in the early morning and regular non-reservation tickets booking are all time available. Tickets can be collected from the main ticket counter at the junction of platform no. 1. Two smart card booths are operational for ticket purchasing through the use computerised smart cards.

A railway car shade forms a part of the station's overall structure, having been designed to cover two trains for rail engine and car maintenance.

=== Redevelopment ===
In 2024, Ministry of Railways allocated ₹28.83 crore (US$3.0 million) for the redevelopment purpose of this station under the Amrit Bharat Station Scheme.

== Barasat Basirhat Railway ==
Barasat Basirhat Railway (BBR) was a 2 ft 6 in (762 mm) gauge railway line started by Martin & Co. in 1914 as part of their wide network of narrow gauge operations under the name of Martin's Light Railways. The line connected the two towns of Barasat and Basirhat near Calcutta (now Kolkata), in West Bengal, India. The line was closed in 1955, after Indian independence (in 1947), when all privately run lines were taken over by the government or were closed. BBR got a fresh lease of life when Indian Railways placed the line under its Eastern Railways zone, Sealdah division and converted the route partly to broad gauge in 1962. Later on, this route was fully restored to 5 ft 6 in (1,676 mm) (Indian gauge) and local trains started using the route.

== Metro Railway Kolkata expansion plan ==
Recently, the government-owned Indian Railways corporation approved a proposal for an underground metro railway station connecting Barasat Junction to Noapara metro station. The construction of the project has started in October 2011.

Extension plan from Noapara to Barasat: The proposed Kolkata Metro Yellow Line extension alignment pass through Dum Dum Cantonment and Jessore Road up to Biman Bandar station. From there, the line would run under Jessore Road until New Barrackpore before reaching the surface at Madhyamgram station. From Madhyamgram to Barasat, the alignment would be elevated. However, for crossing the existing road overbridge at Madhyamgram and Barasat, the alignment would descend gradually to ground level and rise again on viaduct. This is supposed to be beneficial for the people of North 24 Parganas district and will bring them closer to Kolkata's Business district. This would reduce the heavy pressure on Sealdah–Barasat section of Eastern Railways. The Madhyamgram Metro railway station is to be constructed in the Madhyamgram-Barasat section.

Work for the Noapara–Barasat (via NSC Bose Airport) metro extension came to a halt in 2013 as construction giant L&T has pulled out of the 20 km metro corridor project. L&T was unable to get on with the work due to huge encroachment problems on railway land.

L&T has moved out all major equipment from the project site at Barasat and has closed down two of the three site offices. The lone site office is under locked.

After almost 7 years with the ongoing land acquisition problems, Barasat metro was in the brink of getting cancelled. The development of New Barrackpore to Barasat (phase 3 of Yellow Line) was supposed to go elevated to cut down the expenses, but the stretch was in doubt due to huge encroachment problem. But in February 2021, Prime Minister Narendra Modi gave his nod to construct this stretch underground, giving respite to thousands of families who were supposed to be evicted for the development of the elevated stretch.

Yellow Line has now been divided into 3 phases :

- Phase 1: Noapara - Biman Bandar (Services to start from March 2025)
- Phase 2: Biman Bandar - New Barrackpore (under construction)
- Phase 3: New Barrackpore - Barasat (construction to begin soon)

== Gallery ==
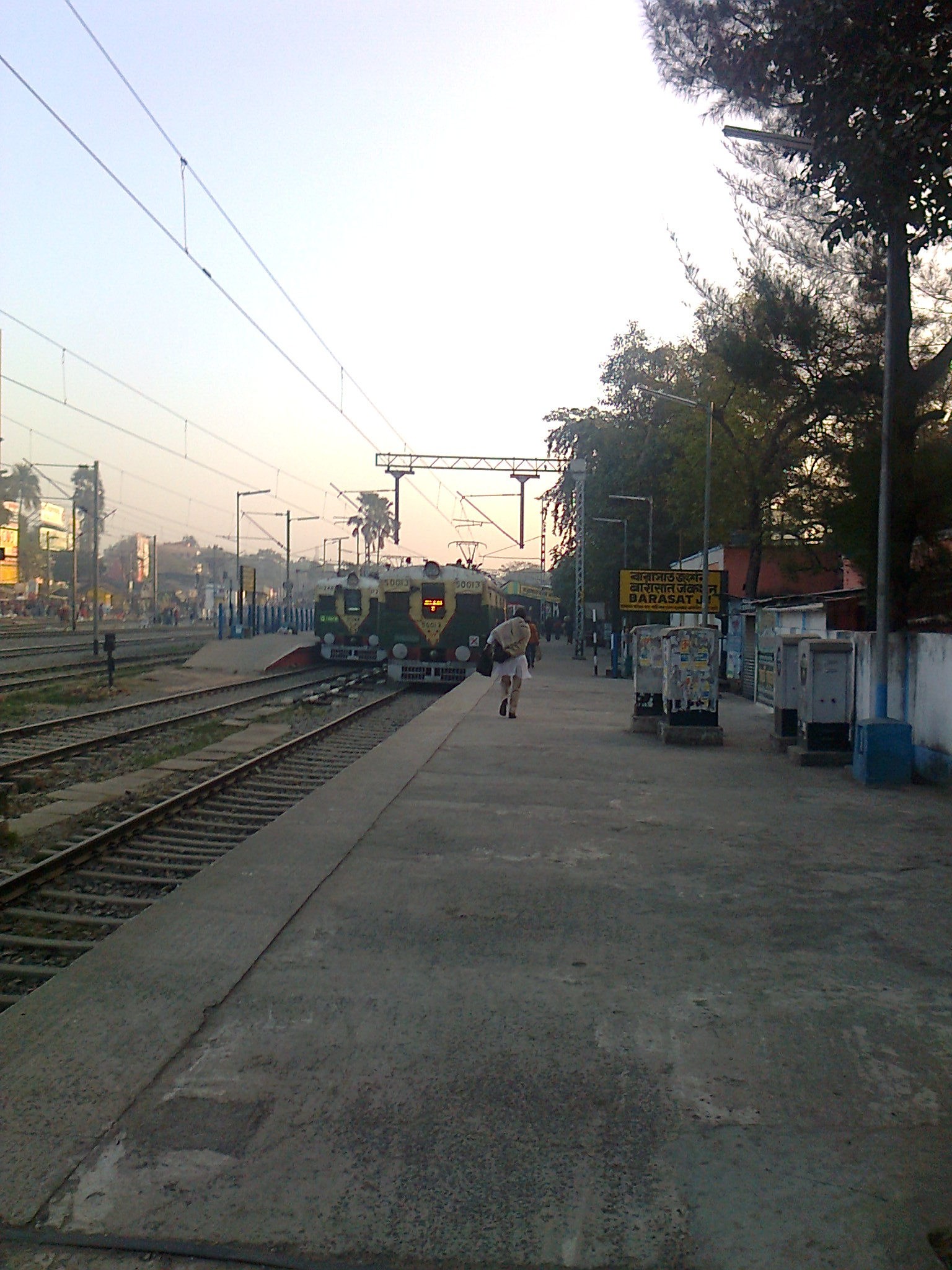
Up and Down Trains in Barasat railway station at platform Number 1 and 2.

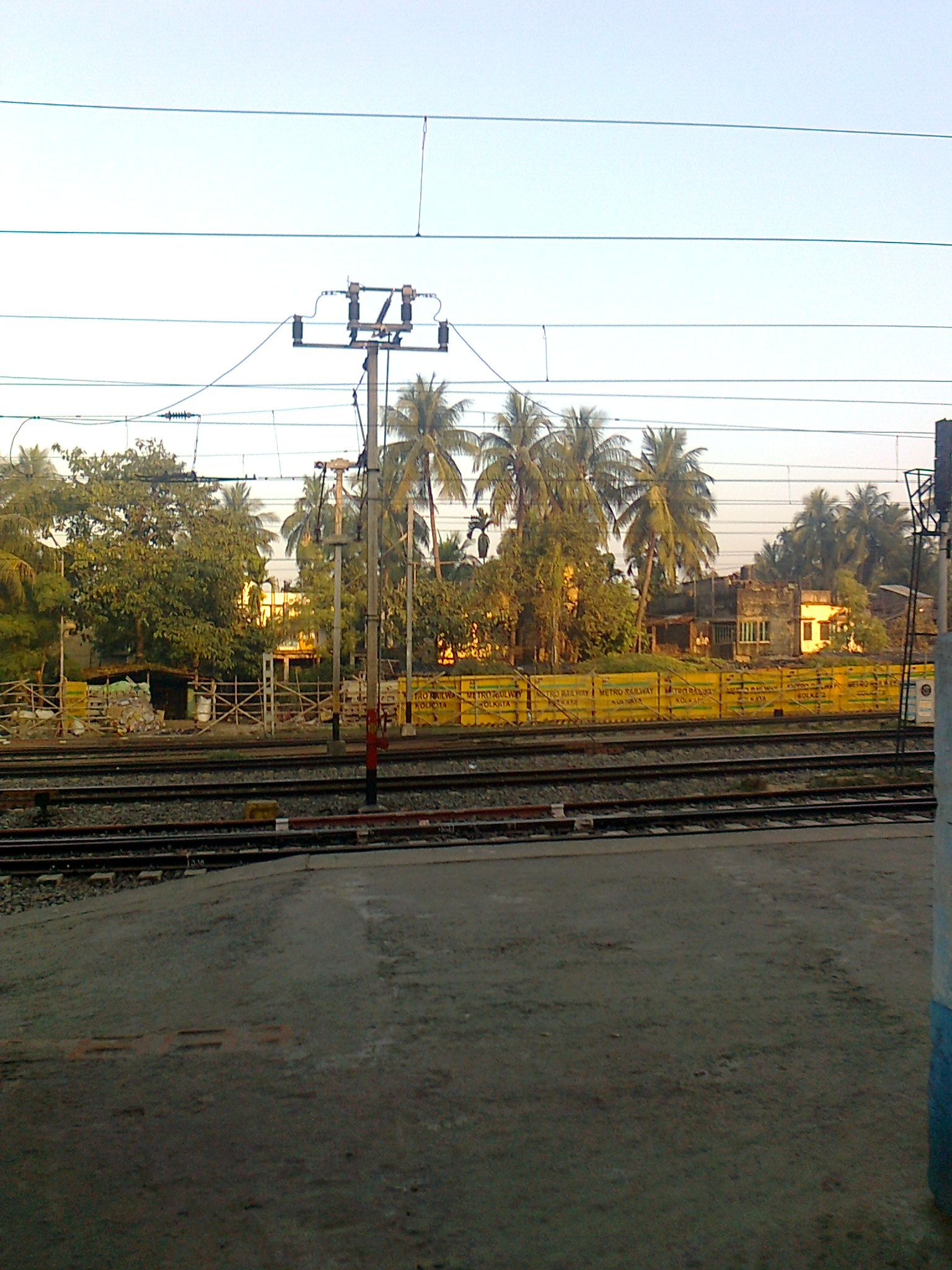
Metro railway construction going on near Barasat Junction

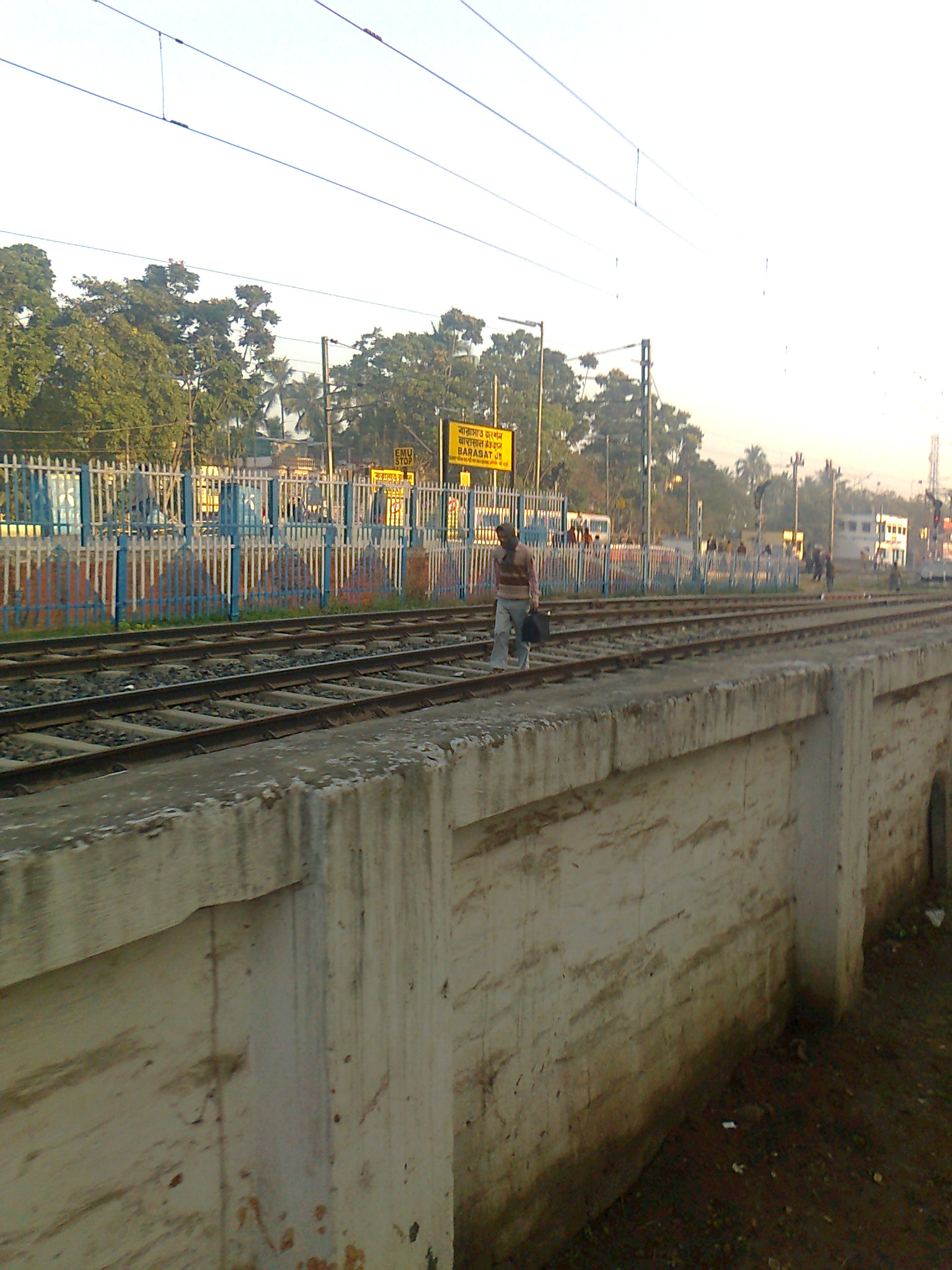
Passengers are walking on the railway tracks at Barasat

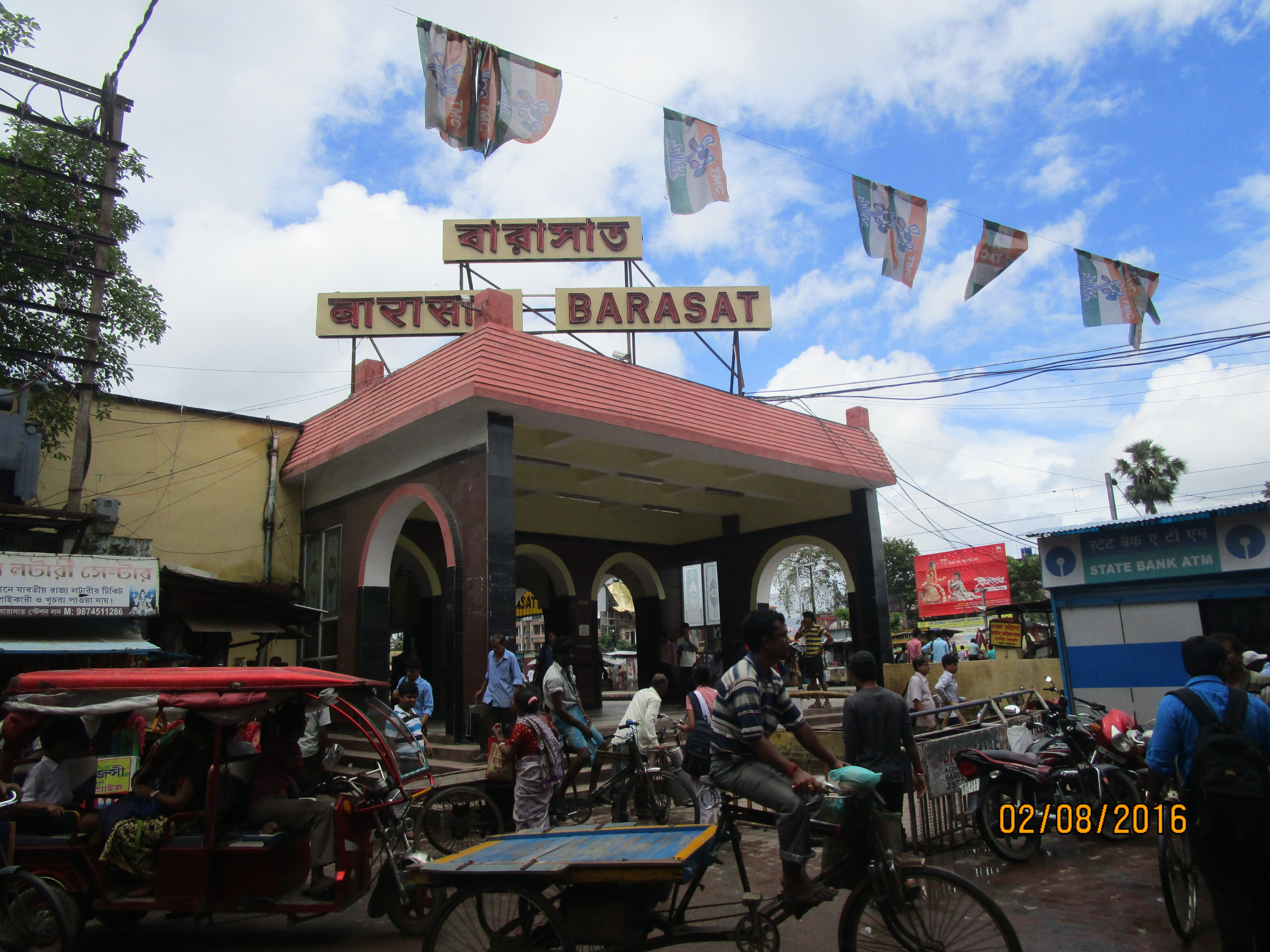
Barasat Junction railway station

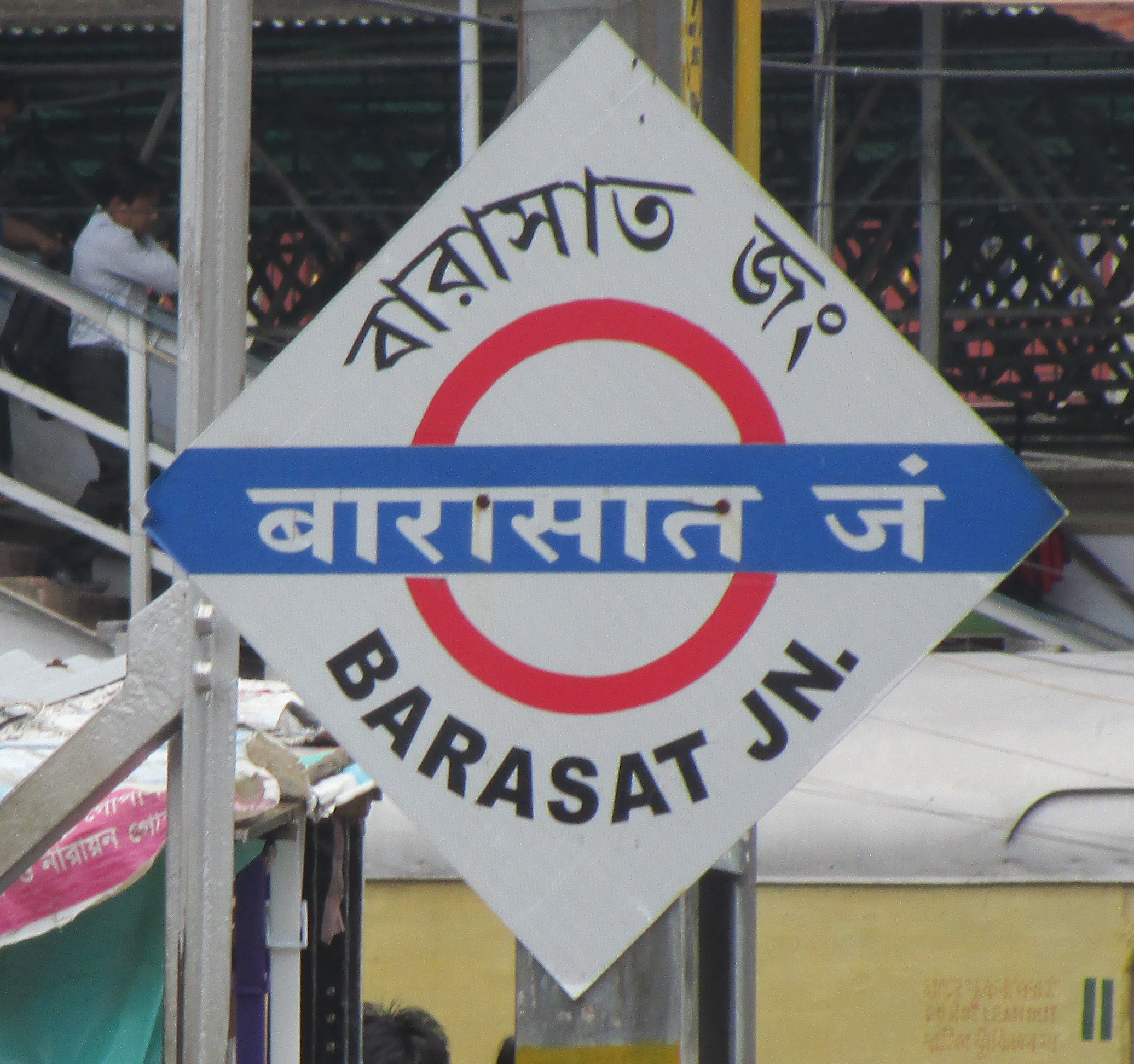
Barasat Junction platformboard

== See also ==
- Bangaon Junction railway station
- Dum Dum Junction railway station
- Indian Railways
- List of Kolkata metro stations
