= Duttapukur railway station =

Railway Station in West Bengal, India

Dattapukur
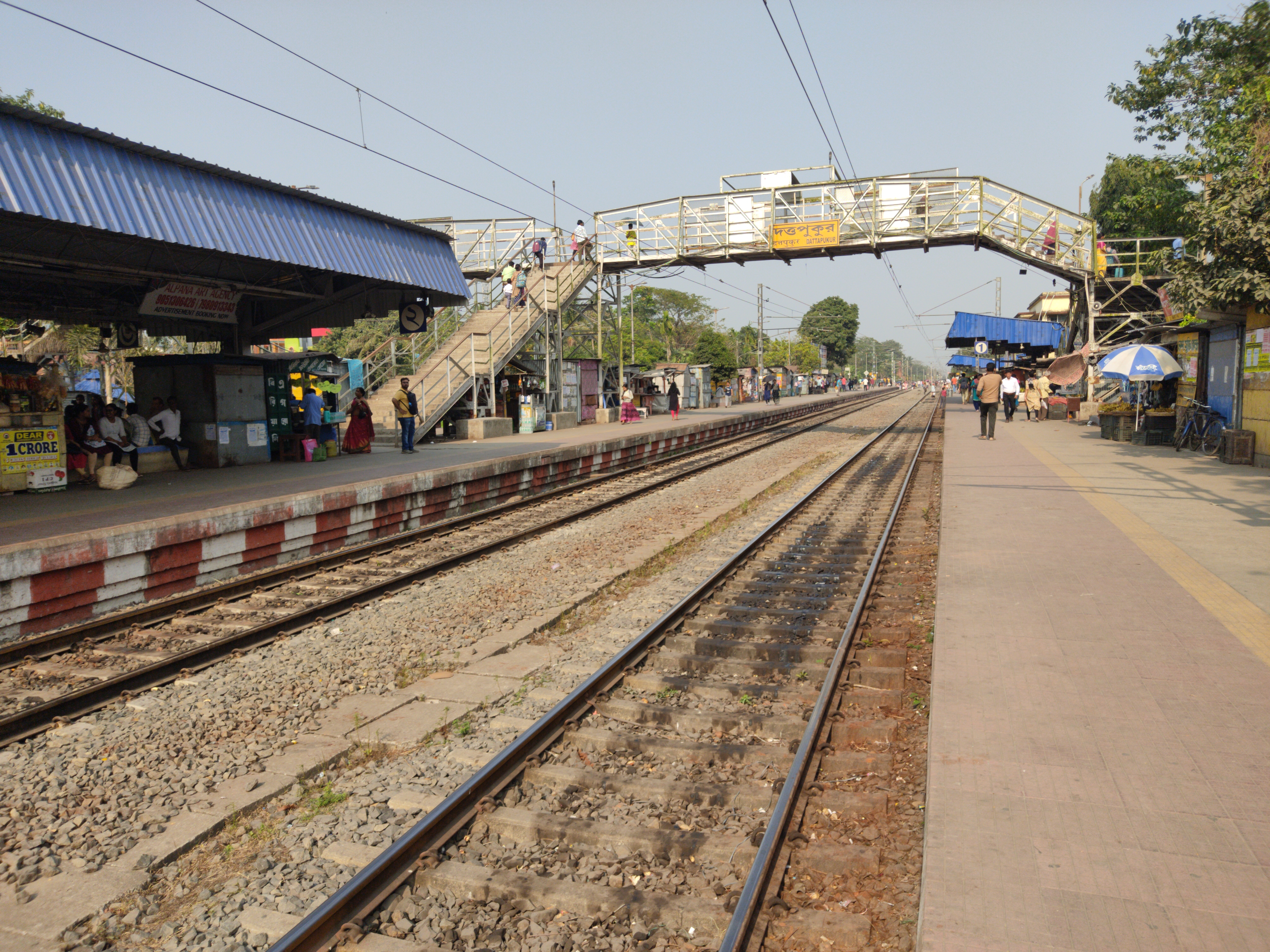

General information
- Location: Duttapukur, North 24 Parganas district, West Bengal; India
- Coordinates: 22.768406°N 88.539646°E
- Elevation: 12.89 metres (42.3 ft)
- System: Kolkata Suburban Railway Station
- Owner: Indian Railways
- Operator: Eastern Railway
- Line: Sealdah–Hasnabad–Bangaon–Ranaghat line of Kolkata Suburban Railway
- Platforms: 3
- Tracks: 3

Construction
- Structure type: At grade
- Parking: No
- Cycle facilities: No

Other information
- Status: Functional
- Station code: DTK
- Zone(s): Eastern Railway
- Division(s): Sealdah

History
- Opened: 1906; 120 years ago
- Electrified: 1972; 54 years ago

Services
Preceding station	Kolkata Suburban Railway	Following station
Bamangachhi towards Sealdah	Eastern Line Dum Dum–Bangaon branch line	Bira towards Bangaon Junction
Route map
Location
- Location within West Bengal Location within India

Dattapukur (also known as Duttapukur) (Code: DTK) is a railway station in North 24 Parganas district, West Bengal on Sealdah-Bangaon line. It serves the town of Duttapukur. The station consists of 3 platforms. The station lacks many facilities including water, sanitation and it being fully sheltered.

== The Station ==
=== Location ===
The station is located on Sealdah–Hasnabad–Bangaon–Ranaghat line of Kolkata Suburban Railway. Link between Dum Dum to Khulna now in Bangladesh, via Bangaon was constructed by Bengal Central Railway Company in 1882–84. The Sealdah–Dum Dum–Barasat–Bangaon sector was electrified in 1963–64.

== Services ==
Eastern Railway operates a couple of local train services, which originate and terminate at this station. They're popularly known as Dattapukur Local among commuters. There are two routes of this type of services, one serves between Sealdah & Dattapukur and another between Majerhat & Dattapukur.

== See also ==
- North 24 Parganas district
- Indian Railways
- Sealdah
- Sealdah–Hasnabad–Bangaon–Ranaghat line
- Bangaon Junction
- Transport in West Bengal
- List of railway stations in India
