= National Highway 112 (India) =

National highway in India

National Highway 112
- Map of National Highway 112 in red

Route information
- Auxiliary route of NH 12
- Part of AH1
- Length: 59 km (37 mi)

Major junctions
- South end: Barasat
- NH 12 – Barasat; SH 2 – Campadadali; NH 312 – Gaighata; N706 / N711 – Petrapole border Crossing
- North end: Bangaon-Petrapole Border

Location
- Country: India
- States: West Bengal

Highway system
- Roads in India; Expressways; National; State; Asian
| ← NH 12 | → NH 112 |

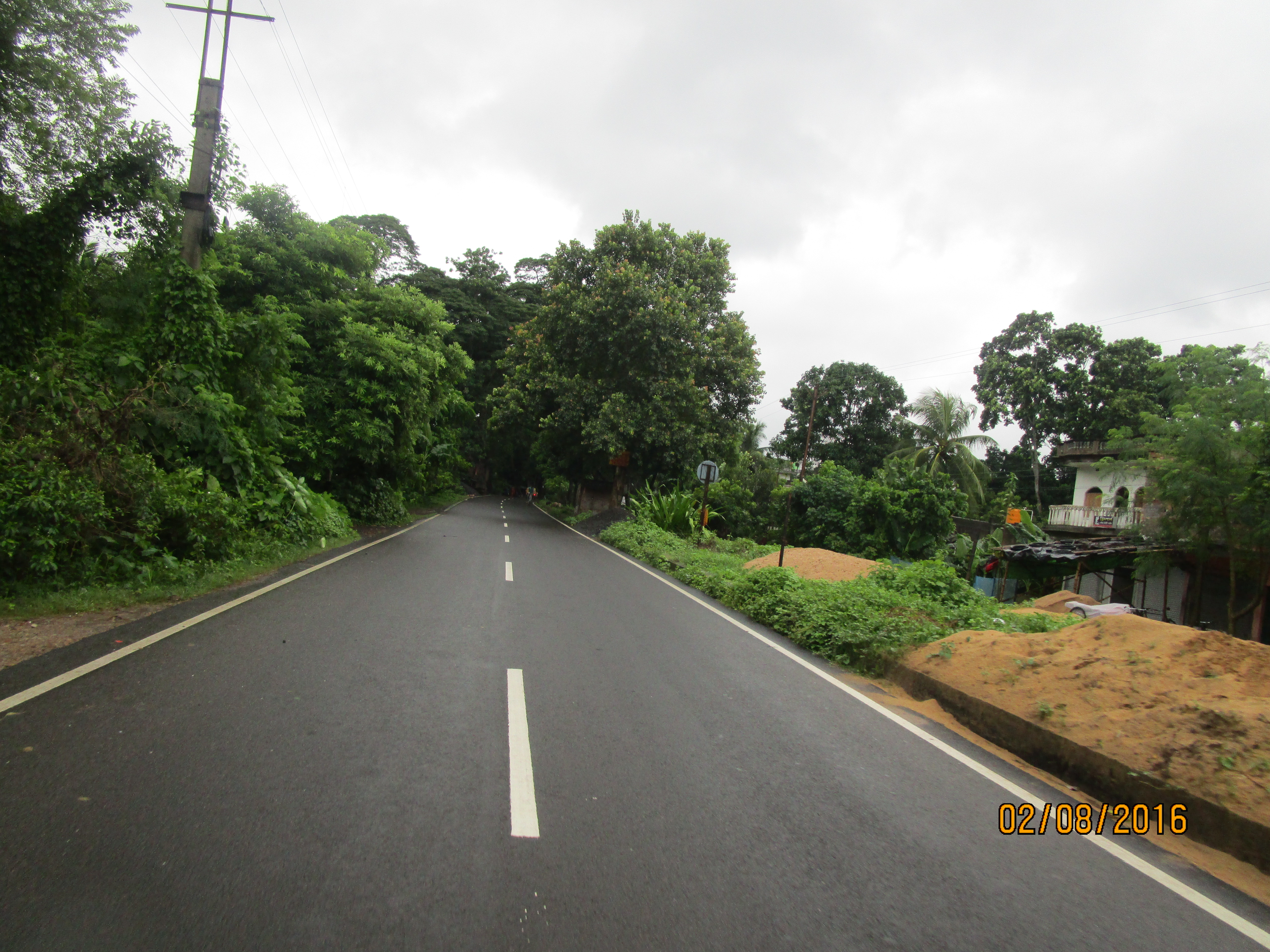
NH 112 at Chhaigharia, Bangaon subdivision

National Highway 112 (NH 112) is a highway in the Indian state of West Bengal. It runs from Barasat to Petrapole border with Bangladesh. The road also known as Jessore road.

NH 112 was earlier denoted as NH 35.

It is one of the most important connecting links between Kolkata and Bangladesh. It is a part of the historic Jessore Road which runs from Shyambazar in North Kolkata to Jessore in Bangladesh.

NH 112 originates from National Highway 12 at Barasat Dak bangalow More and ends at Petrapole near Bangaon, traversing the district of North 24 Parganas. Its eastward continuation, N706 extends to Jessore District in Bangladesh.

== Places off NH 112 ==
- Barasat
- Duttapukur
- Bamangachi
- Guma
- Ashoknagar
- Habra
- Gaighata
- Thakurnagar ( East Side from Jessore Road)
- Sonatikiri
- Chandpara
- Bangaon
- Petrapole

== Junctions ==
NH 12 Terminal near Barasat
NH 312
N706 Terminal at Petrapole on India-Bangladesh border

== Asian Highway Network ==
The highway is also the part of projected highway network of Asian Highway 1 which starts from Tokyo, Japan and end in Istanbul, Turkey.

== See also ==
- List of national highways in India
- National Highways Development Project
