= Duttapukur =

- Census Town
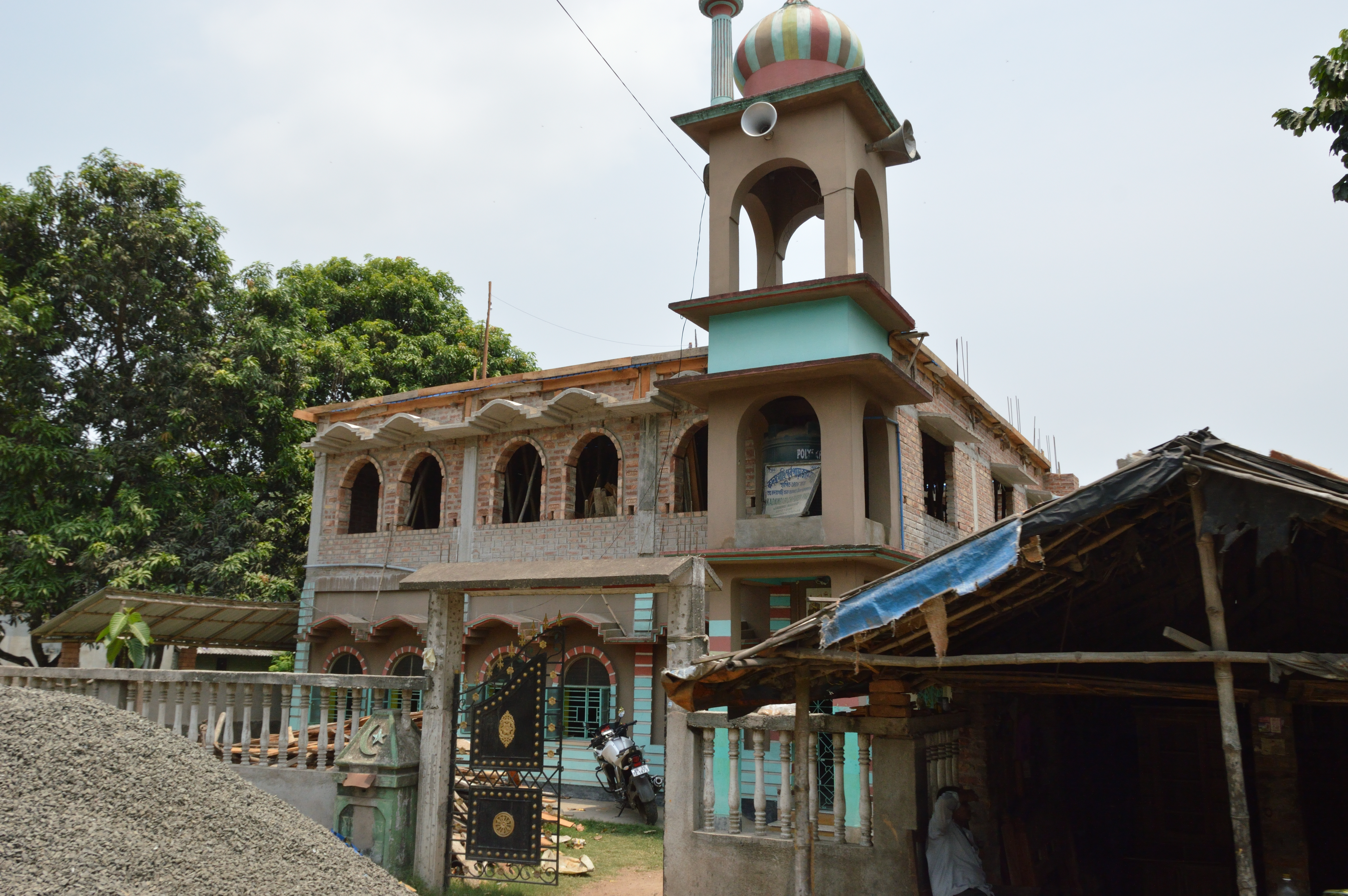
- East Qadambagchi Jame Mosque, Duttapukur

- Location in West Bengal, India Duttapukur (India)
- Coordinates: 22.7728°N 88.5447°E
- Country: India
- State: West Bengal
- District: North 24 Parganas

Area
  - Total: 3.29 km^{2} (1.27 sq mi)

Population (2011)
  - Total: 25,557
  - Density: 7,770/km^{2} (20,100/sq mi)

Languages
  - Official: Bengali, English
- Time zone: UTC+5:30 (IST)
- PIN: 743248
- Telephone code: +91 33
- Vehicle registration: WB
- Lok Sabha constituency: Barrackpore
- Vidhan Sabha constituency: Amdanga

Duttapukur (also known as Nebadhai Duttapukur ) is a Census Town in the Barasat I CD block in the North 24 Parganas district in the Indian state of West Bengal.

== Geography ==
Cities, towns and locations in Barasat subdivision, North 24 Parganas
M: municipal town, CT: census town, R: rural/ urban centre, H: historical centre
Owing to space constraints in the small map, the actual locations in a larger map may vary slightly

=== Location ===
Duttapukur is located at 22.7728°N 88.5447°E.

Duttapukur is located in the Ganges Brahmaputra delta region in the district of North 24 parganas, West Bengal state in the Eastern part of India. A tributary of Bidyadhari River known as Suti flows through Duttapukur. Duttapukur is 30 km from Sealdah & 35 km from Howrah, 7 km from Barasat and 32 km from Bongaon on the Sealdah-Bangaon section of Eastern Railway

As per District Census Handbook 2011, Duttapukur covered an area of 3.29 km^{2}

Duttapukur, Shibalaya, Chandrapur, Gangapur, Chalta Baria and Joypul form a cluster of census towns in the northern part of the CD block. The entire cluster has a very high density of population. (See the infobox of each census town for density of population).

=== Area overview ===
The area covered in the map alongside is largely a part of the north Bidyadhari Plain. located in the lower Ganges Delta. The country is flat. It is a little raised above flood level and the highest ground borders the river channels. 54.67% of the people of the densely populated area lives in the urban areas and 45.33% lives in the rural areas.

Note: The map alongside presents some of the notable locations in the subdivision. All places marked in the map are linked in the larger full screen map.

== Demographics ==
As of 2011 India census, Nebadhai Duttapukur a Census Town had a population of 25,557; of this, 12,902 are male, 12,655 female .

As of 2001 India census, Nebadhai Duttapukur had a population of 19,882. Males constitute 51% of the population and females 49%. Nebadhai Duttapukur has an average literacy rate of 77%, higher than the national average of 59.5%; with 82% of the males and 73% of females literate. 9% of the population is under 6 years of age.
