= North 24 Parganas district =

District in West Bengal, India

North 24 Parganas district Uttor Chobbish Pôrgônā Jelā (Bengali)
- District of West Bengal
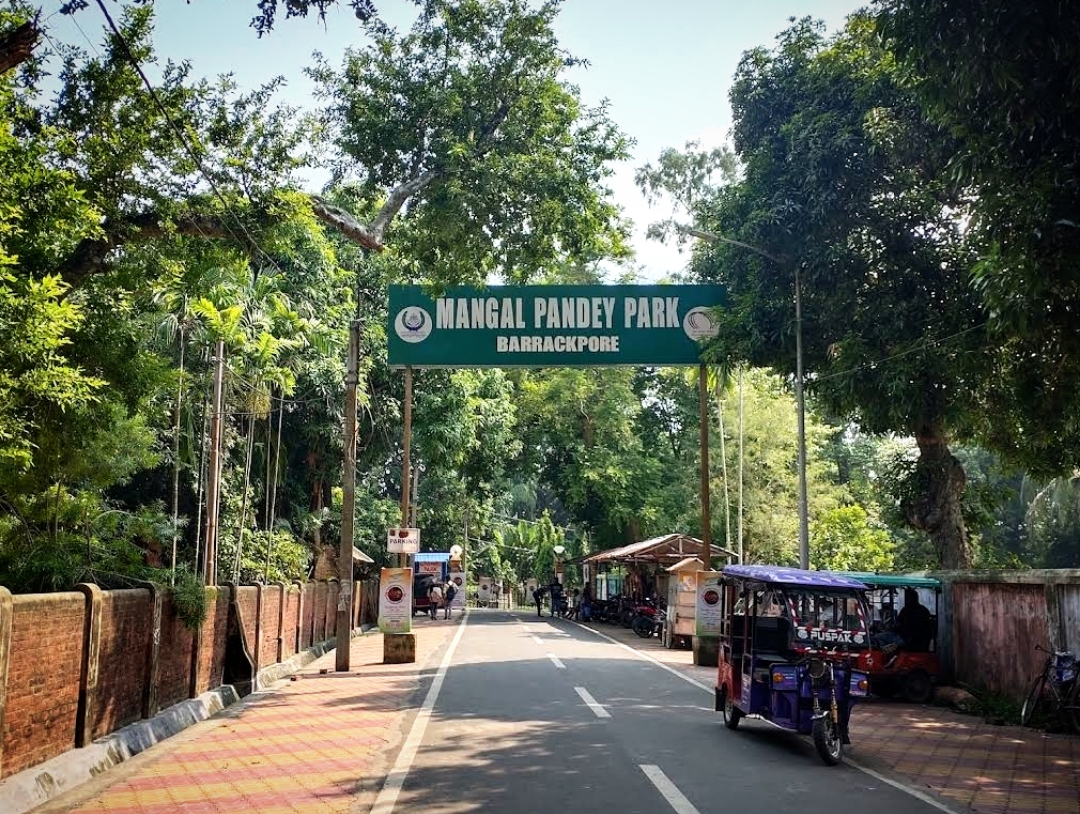
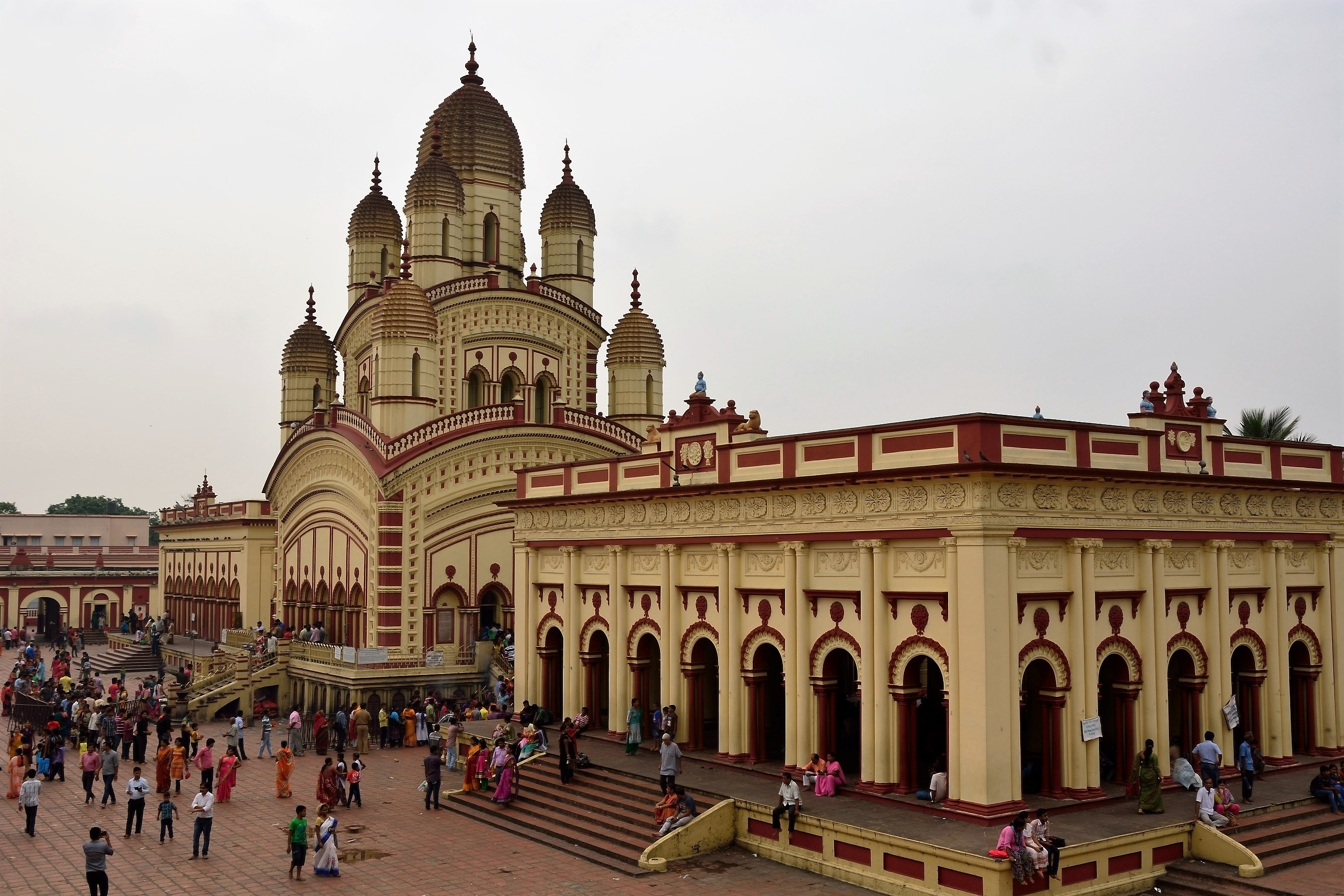
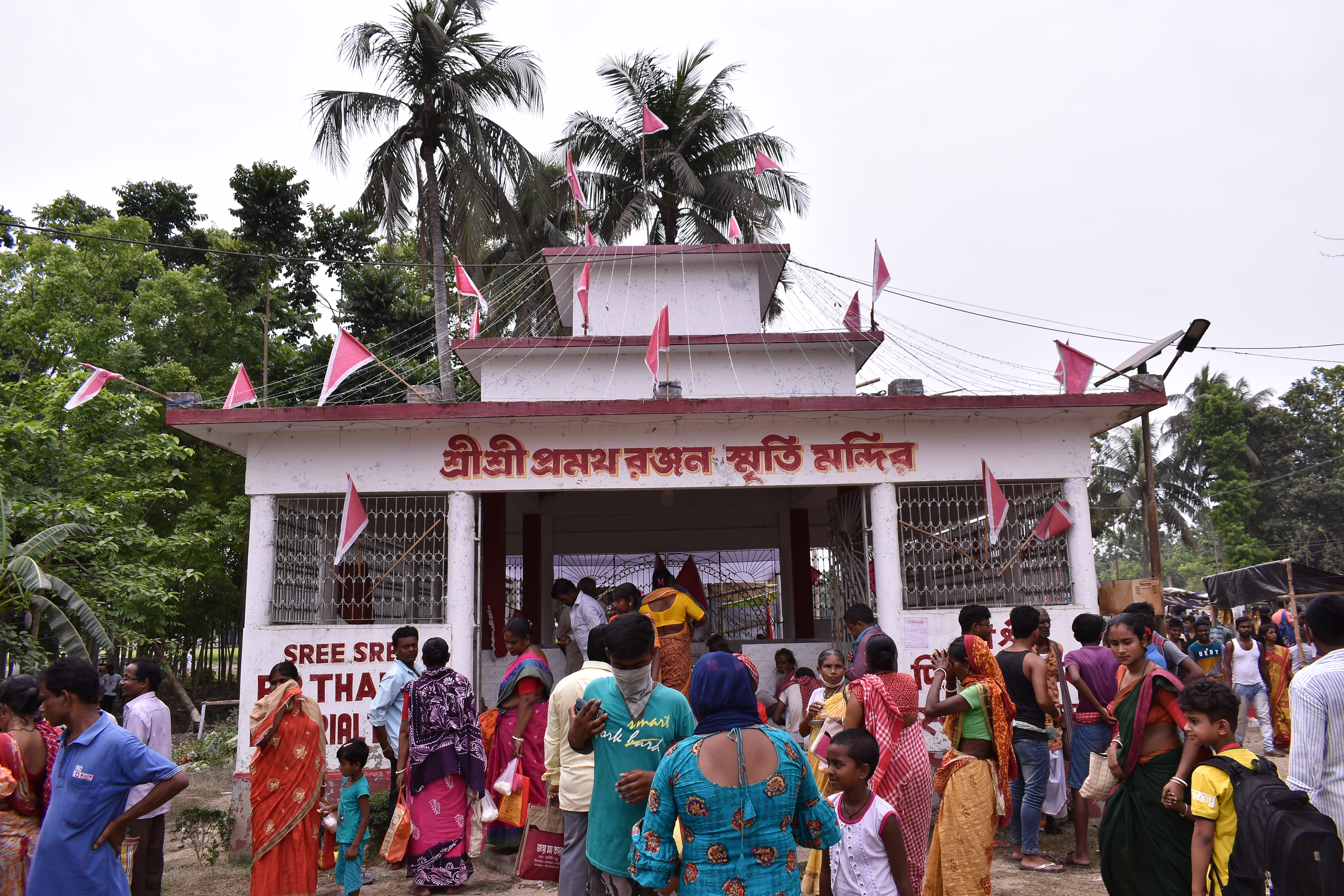
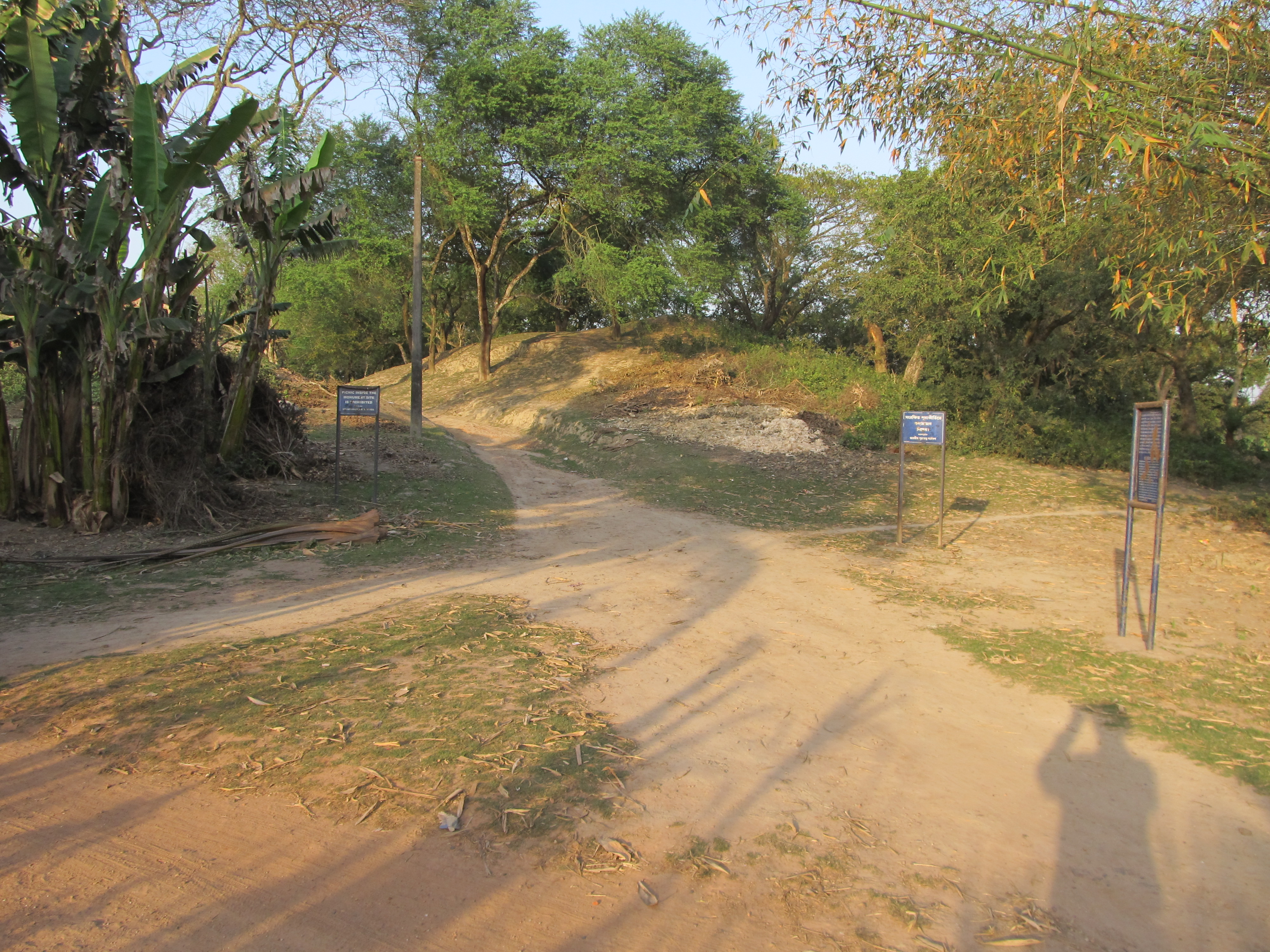
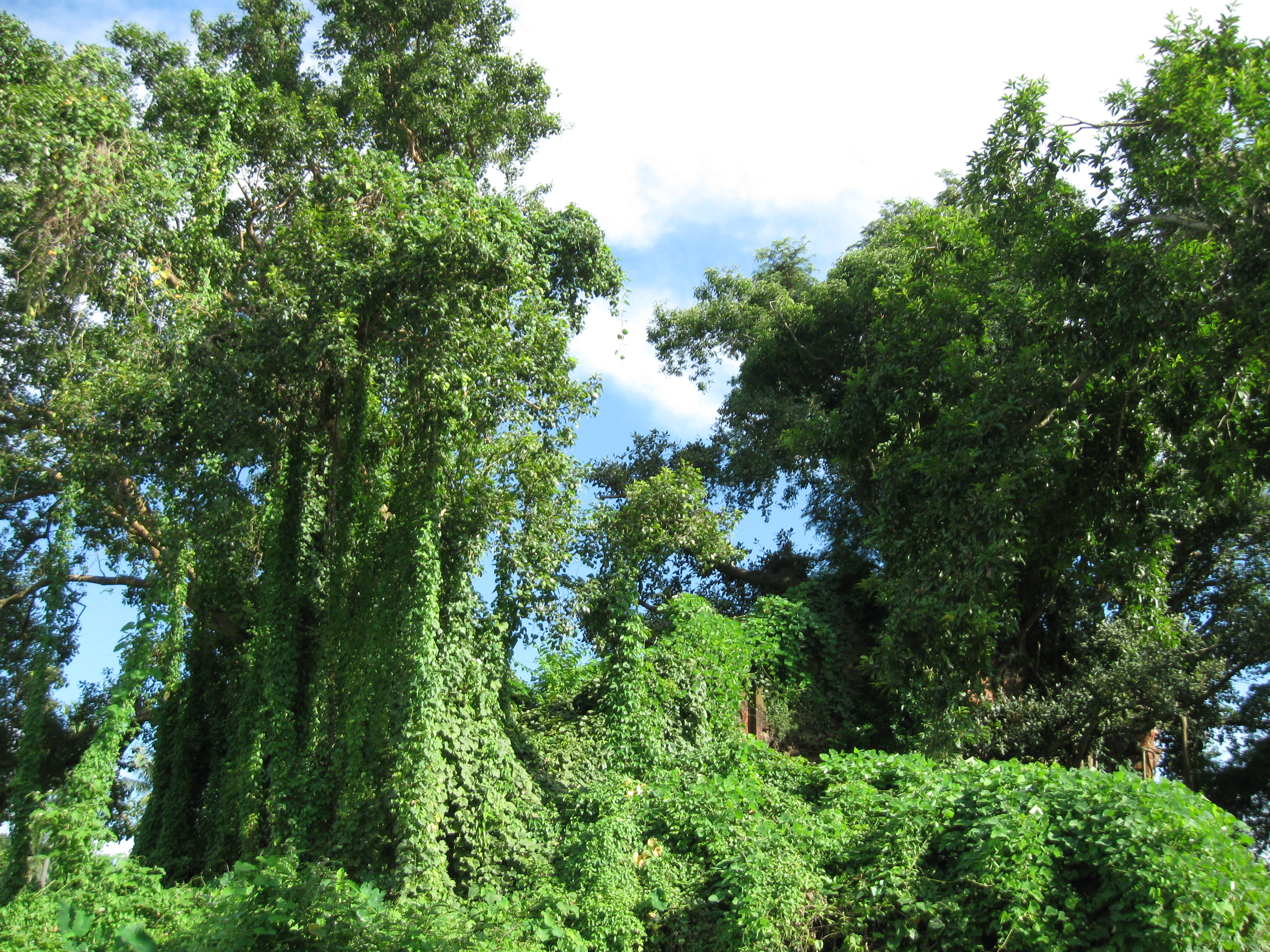
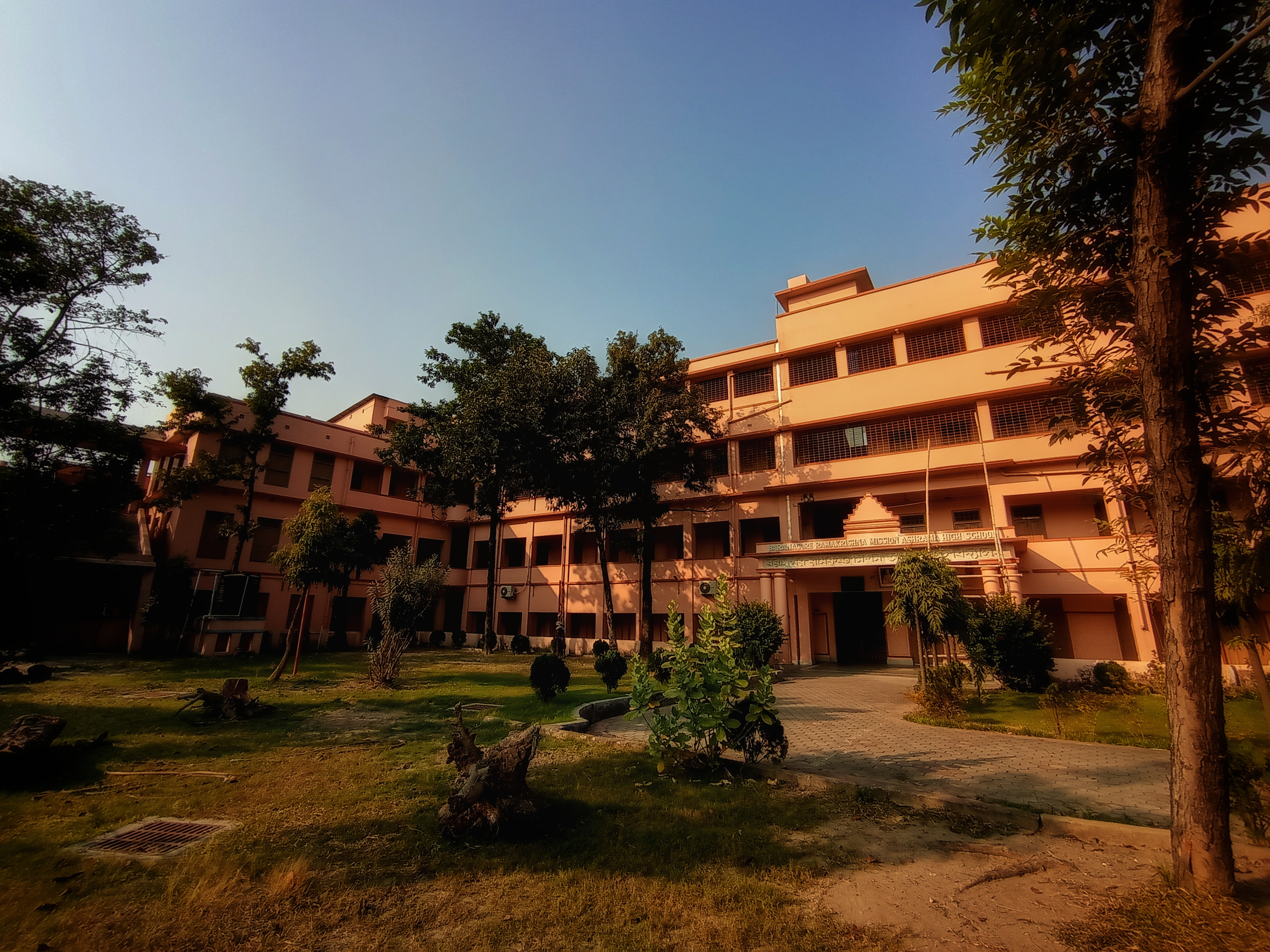
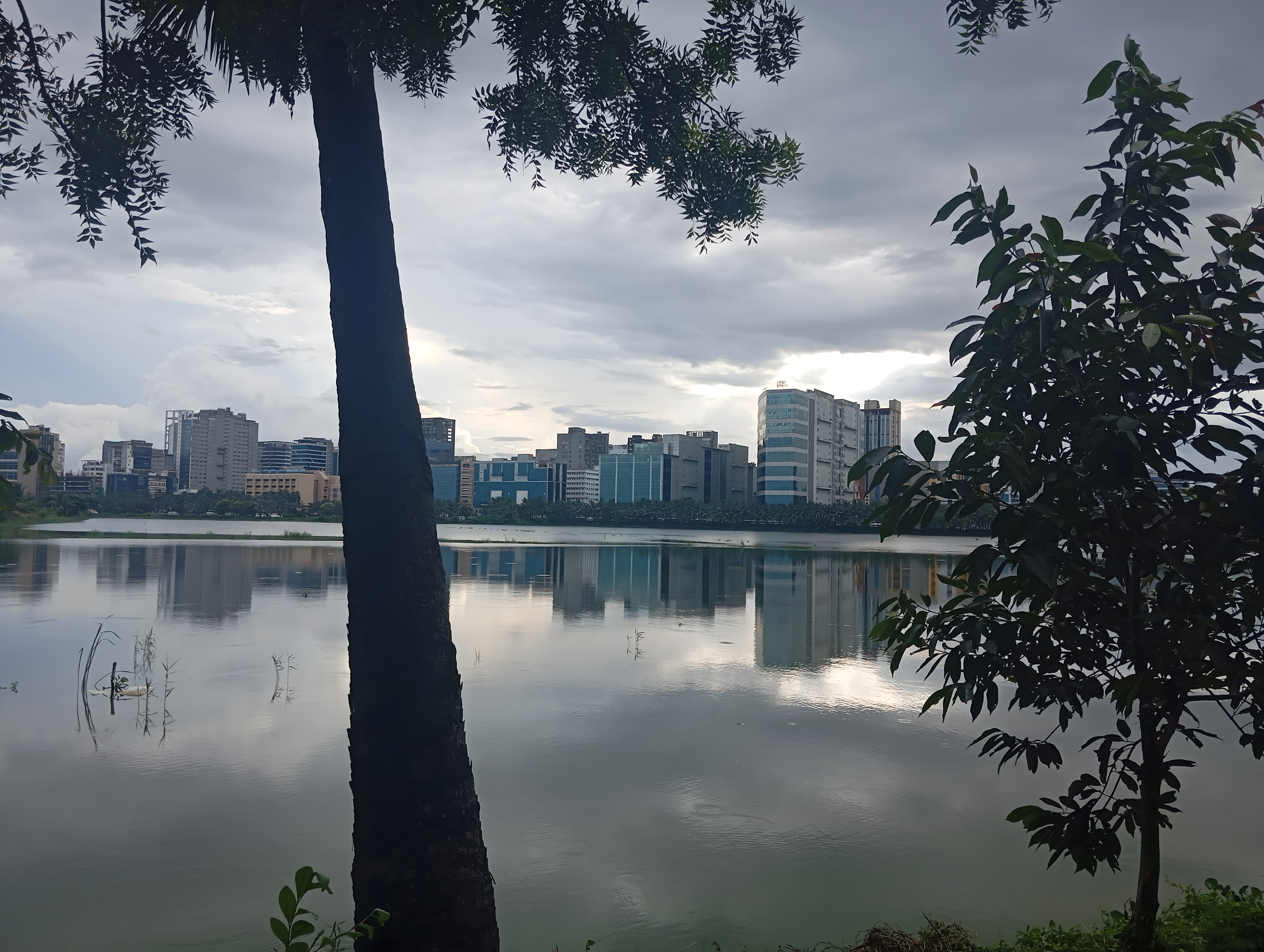
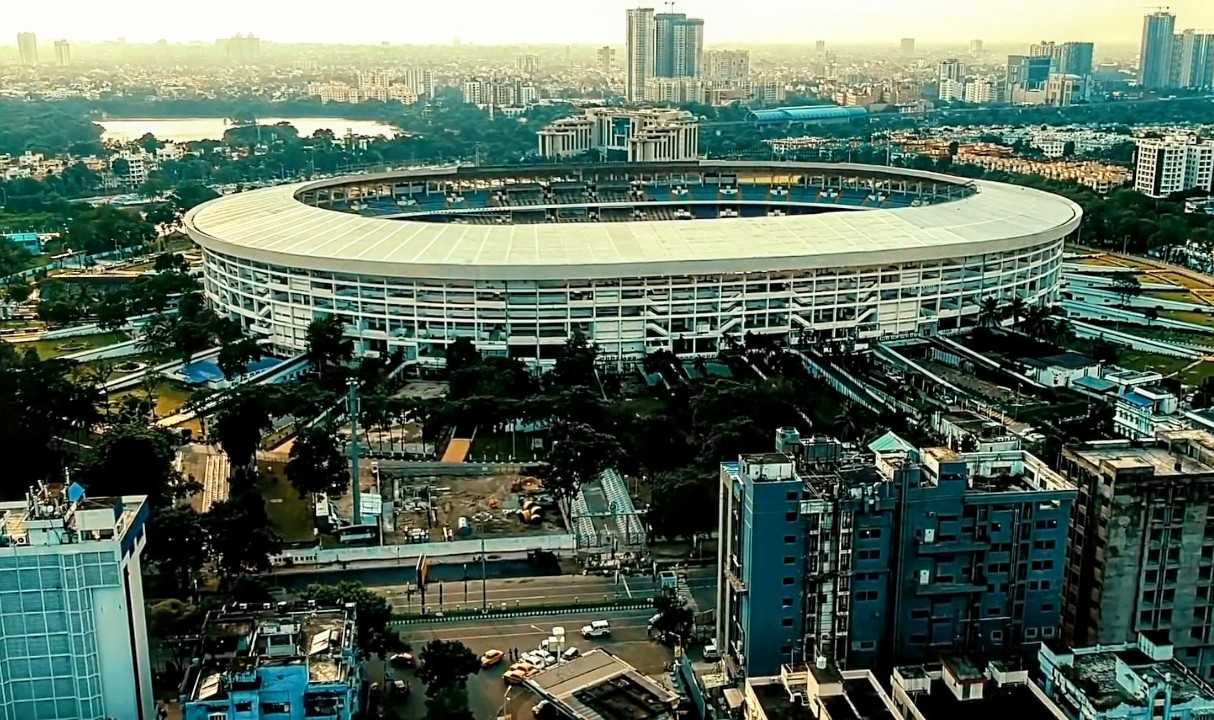
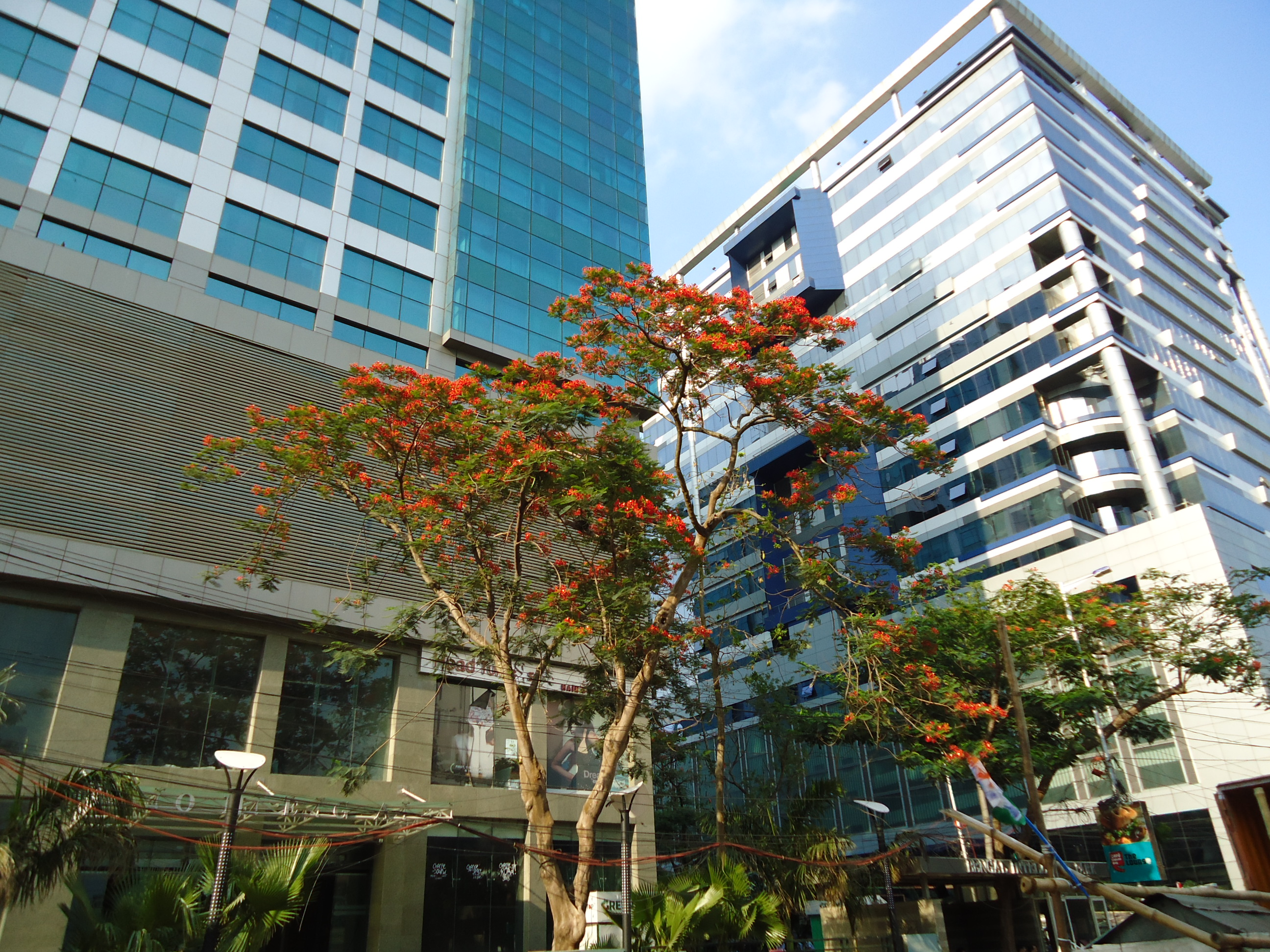
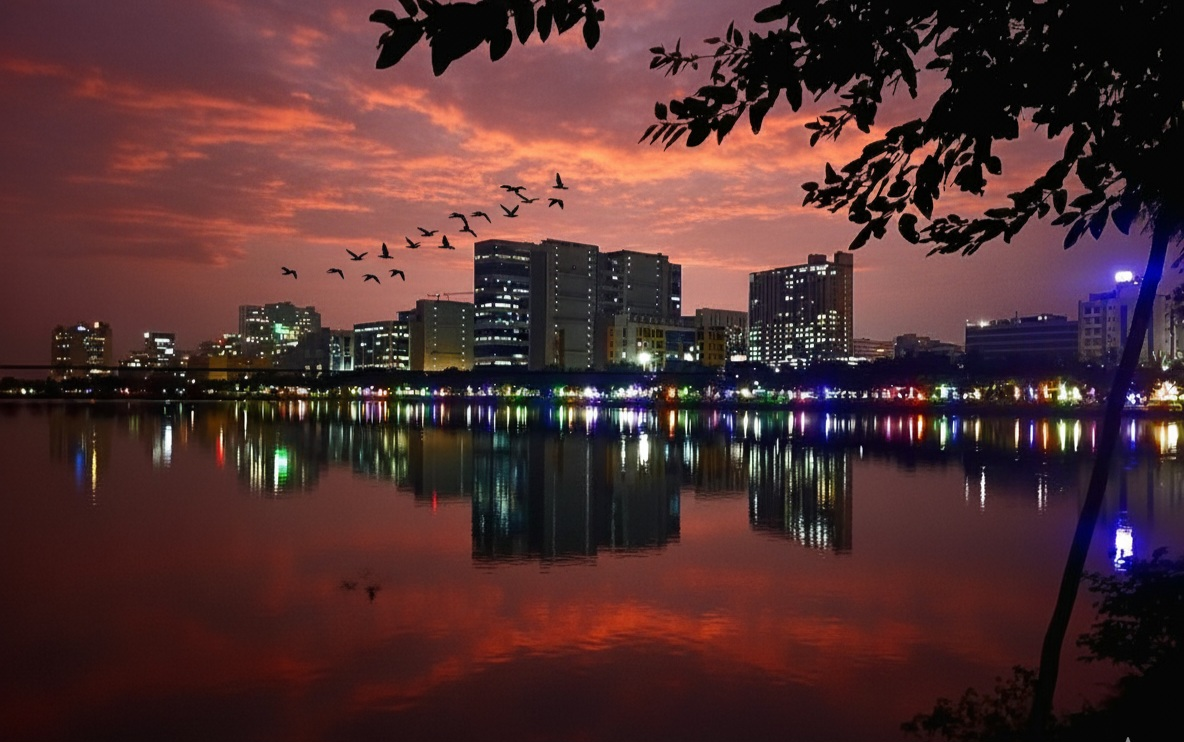
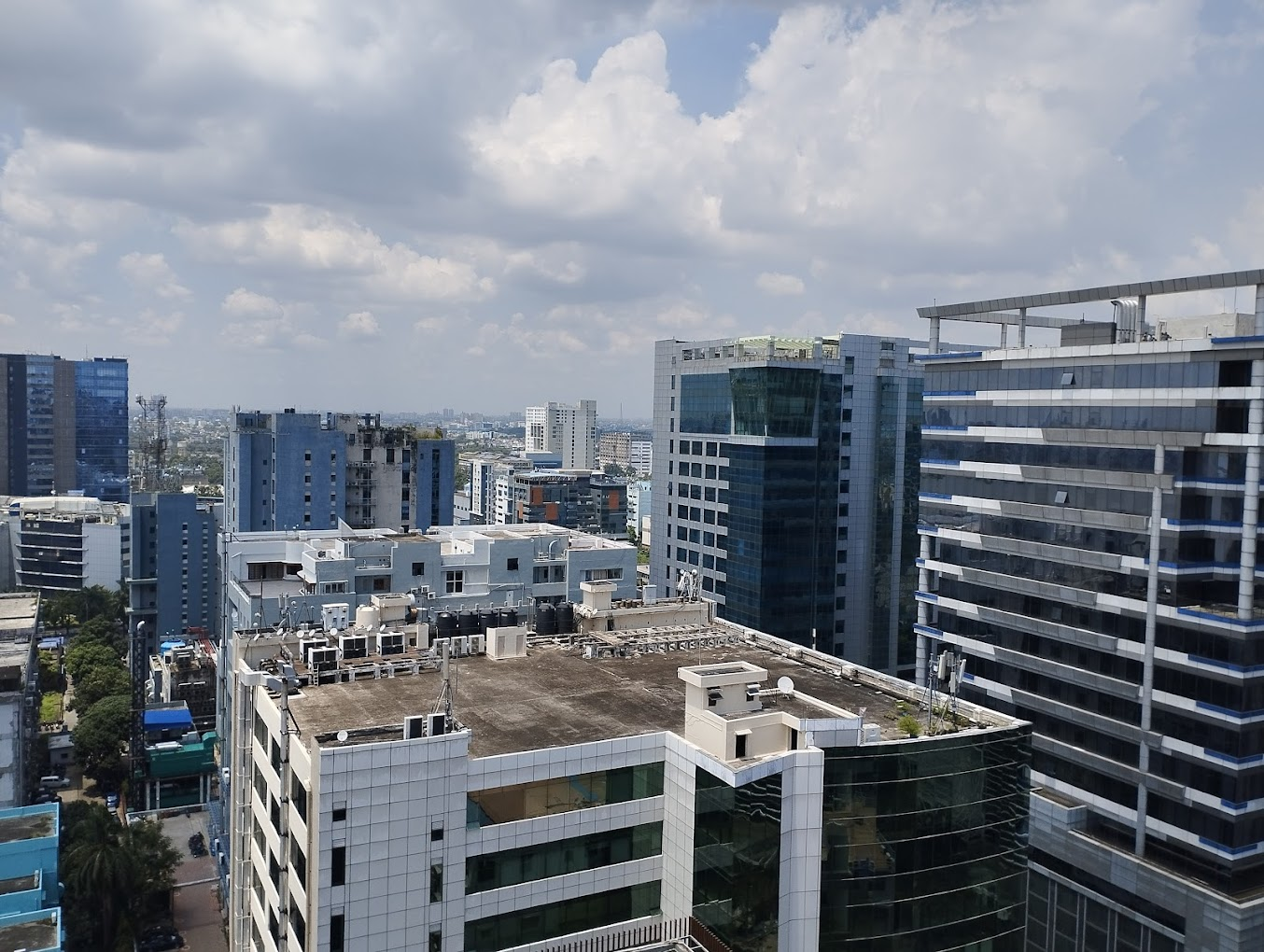
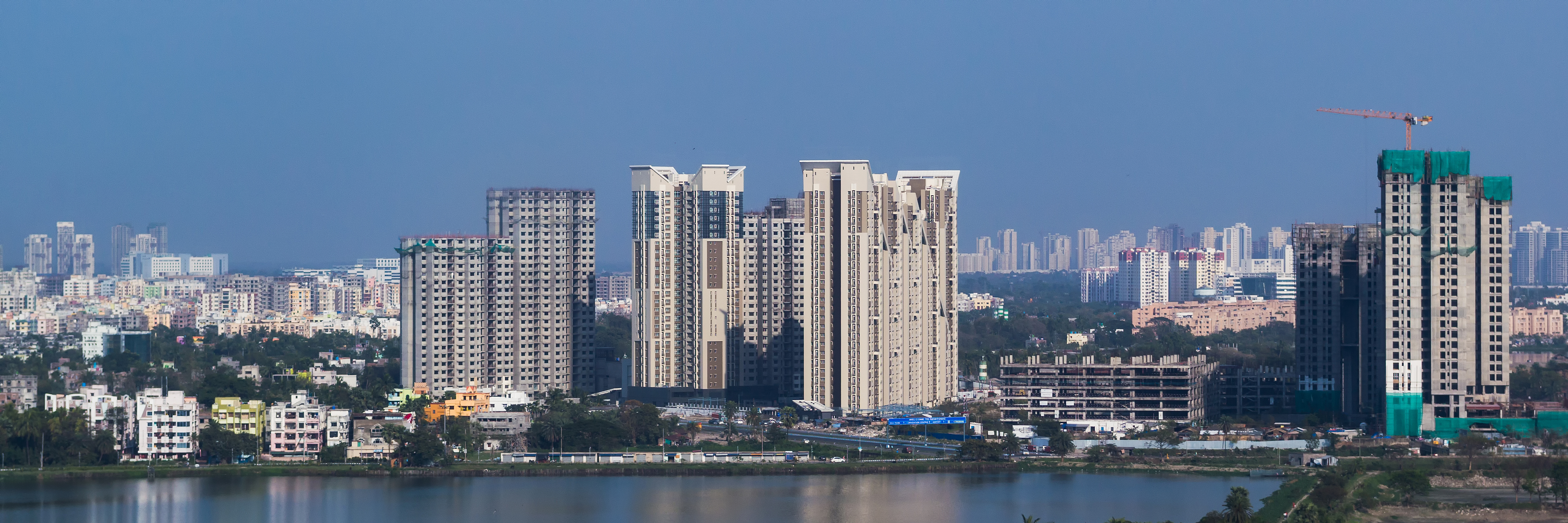
- Top to bottom, left to right: Mangal Pandey Park in Barrackpore; Dakshineswar Kali temple; Matua Mahasangha headquarters in Thakurnagar; Chandraketugarh; Lal Masjid in Berachampa; Baranagar Ramakrishna Mission; Sector-5 skyline; Salt Lake Stadium; Omega and Infinity Benchmark; Salt Lake Sector V Sunset; Salt Lake Sector-V; View of Mahishbathan
- Interactive Map Outlining North 24 Parganas District
- Location of North 24 Parganas district in West Bengal
- Coordinates: 22°43′N 88°29′E
- Country: India
- State: West Bengal
- Division: Presidency
- Headquarters: Barasat

Government
  - DM & DC: Smt. Shilpa Gourisaria, IAS
  - Subdivisions: Bidhannagar, Barrackpore, Barasat Sadar, Bangaon, Basirhat
  - CD Blocks: Rajarhat, Barrackpore I, Barrackpore II, Barasat I, Barasat II, Amdanga, Deganga, Habra I, Habra II, Bagdah, Bangaon, Gaighata, Baduria, Swarupnagar, Basirhat I, Basirhat II, Haroa, Minakhan, Hasnabad, Sandeshkhali I, Sandeshkhali II, Hingalganj
  - Lok Sabha constituencies: Bangaon, Barrackpore, Dum Dum, Barasat, Basirhat
  - Vidhan Sabha constituencies: Bagdah, Bangaon Uttar, Bangaon Dakshin, Gaighata, Swarupnagar, Baduria, Habra, Ashoknagar, Amdanga, Bijpur, Naihati, Bhatpara, Jagatdal, Noapara, Barrackpore, Khardaha, Dum Dum Uttar, Panihati, Kamarhati, Baranagar, Dum Dum, Madhyamgram, Barasat, Rajarhat New Town, Bidhannagar, Rajarhat Gopalpur, Deganga, Haroa, Minakhan, Sandeshkhali, Basirhat Dakshin, Basirhat Uttar, Hingalganj

Area
  - Total: 4,094 km^{2} (1,581 sq mi)

Population (2011)
  - Total: 10,009,781
  - Density: 2,445/km^{2} (6,332/sq mi)
  - Urban: 5,732,162

Demographics
  - Literacy: 84.95 per cent
  - Gender ratio: 1000 ♂/955 ♀

Languages
  - Official: Bengali
  - Additional official: English
- Time zone: UTC+05:30 (IST)
- Website: north24parganas.gov.in

North 24 Parganas (abv. 24 PGS (N)) or sometimes North Twenty Four Parganas is a district in southern West Bengal, of eastern India. North 24 Parganas extends in the tropical zone from latitude 22°11′6″ N to 23°15′2″ N and from longitude 88°20′ E to 89°5′ E. Barasat is the district headquarters of North 24 Parganas. North 24 Parganas is West Bengal's most populous district and also (since 2014) the most populated district in the whole of India. It is the tenth-largest district in the State by area.

== History ==
=== Pre-independence ===
The territory of Greater 24 Parganas were under the Satgaon (ancient Saptagram, now in Hoogly district) administration during the Mughal era and later it was included in Hoogly chakla (district under post-Mughal Nawabi rule) during the rule of Murshid Quli Khan. In 1757, after the Battle of Plassey, Nawab Mir Jafar conferred the Zamindari of 24 parganas and janglimahals (small administrative units) upon the British East India Company. These Parganas are (O'Mally, L.S.S. (1914) Bengal District Gazetteers: 24 Parganas. Page 44):

1. Akbarpur
2. Amirpur
3. Asimabad
4. Balia
5. Baridhati
6. Basandhari
7. Birati
8. Calcutta
9. Dakshin Sagar
10. Garh
11. Hathiagarh
12. Ikhtiarpur
13. Kharijuri
14. Khaspur
15. Maidanmal or Mednimall
16. Magura
17. Mayda
18. Manpur
19. Murnagacha
20. Paika
21. Pechakul
22. Satal
23. Shahnagar
24. Shahpur
25. Uttar Pargana

Since then, this entire territory is known as '24 Parganas'.

In 1751, the Company assigned John Zephaniah Holwell as zemindar of the District. In 1759, after the Bengali War of 1756–1757, the Company assigned it to Lord Clive as a personal Jaghir (zamindari) and after his death it again came under the direct authority of the company.

In 1793, during the rule of Lord Cornwallis, entire Sunderbans were in Twentyfour Parganas. In 1802, some parganas on the western banks of river Hoogly were included into it. These parganas were in Nadia earlier. In 1814, a separate collectorate was established in Twenty-four Parganas. In 1817, Falta and Baranagar and in 1820, some portions of Nadia's Balanda and Anwarpur were encompassed to it. In 1824, portions of Barasat, Khulna and Bakhargunge (now in Bangladesh) were also included to it. In 1824, the district headquarters was shifted from Kolkata to Baruipur, but in 1828, it was removed to Alipore. In 1834, the district was split into two districts – Alipore and Barasat, but later these were united again.

In 1905, some portion of this district around the Sunderbans was detached and linked to Khulna and Barisal. These parts remained in Bangladesh territories where Jessore's Bangaon was joined to Twentyfour Pargana after the 1947 partition.

=== After Independence ===
In 1980, an administrative reform committee under the chairmanship of Dr. Ashok Mitra suggested splitting the district into two and as per the recommendation of the committee in 1983, on 1 March 1986, two new districts – North 24 Parganas (24 PGS (N)) and South 24 Parganas (24 PGS (S)) were created. The North 24 Parganas which was included in the Presidency division has been formed with five sub-divisions of the Greater 24 Parganas, namely Barasat Sadar (Headquarters), Barrackpore, Basirhat, Bangaon, and Bidhannagar (a satellite township of Kolkata, popularly known as Salt Lake).

On 1 August 2022, the Chief Minister of West Bengal Mamata Banerjee announced to create two more districts named Ichamati district consisting of Bangaon subdivision and a yet unnamed district consisting of Basirhat subdivision by bifurcating the district for better development and smooth administration purpose.

== Geography ==
The district lies within the Ganga–Brahmaputra delta. The major distributary of river Ganga that is river Hooghly flows along the western border of the district. There are many other distributary branches, sub-branches of Ganga river and other local rivers, which include the Ichhamati, Jamuna, and Bidyadhari.

== Economy ==
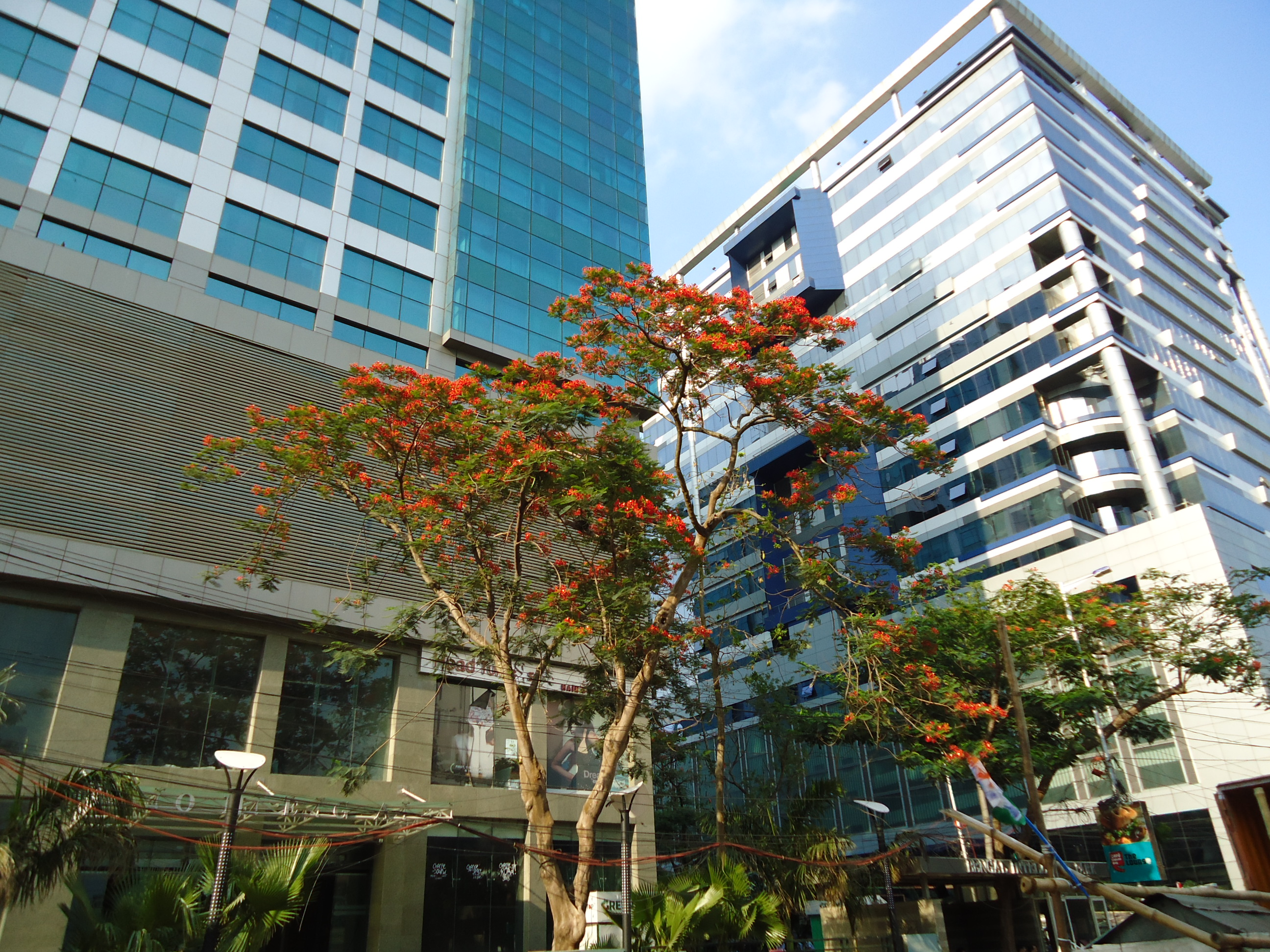
Omega and Infinity Benchmark, office buildings in Salt Lake, Kolkata

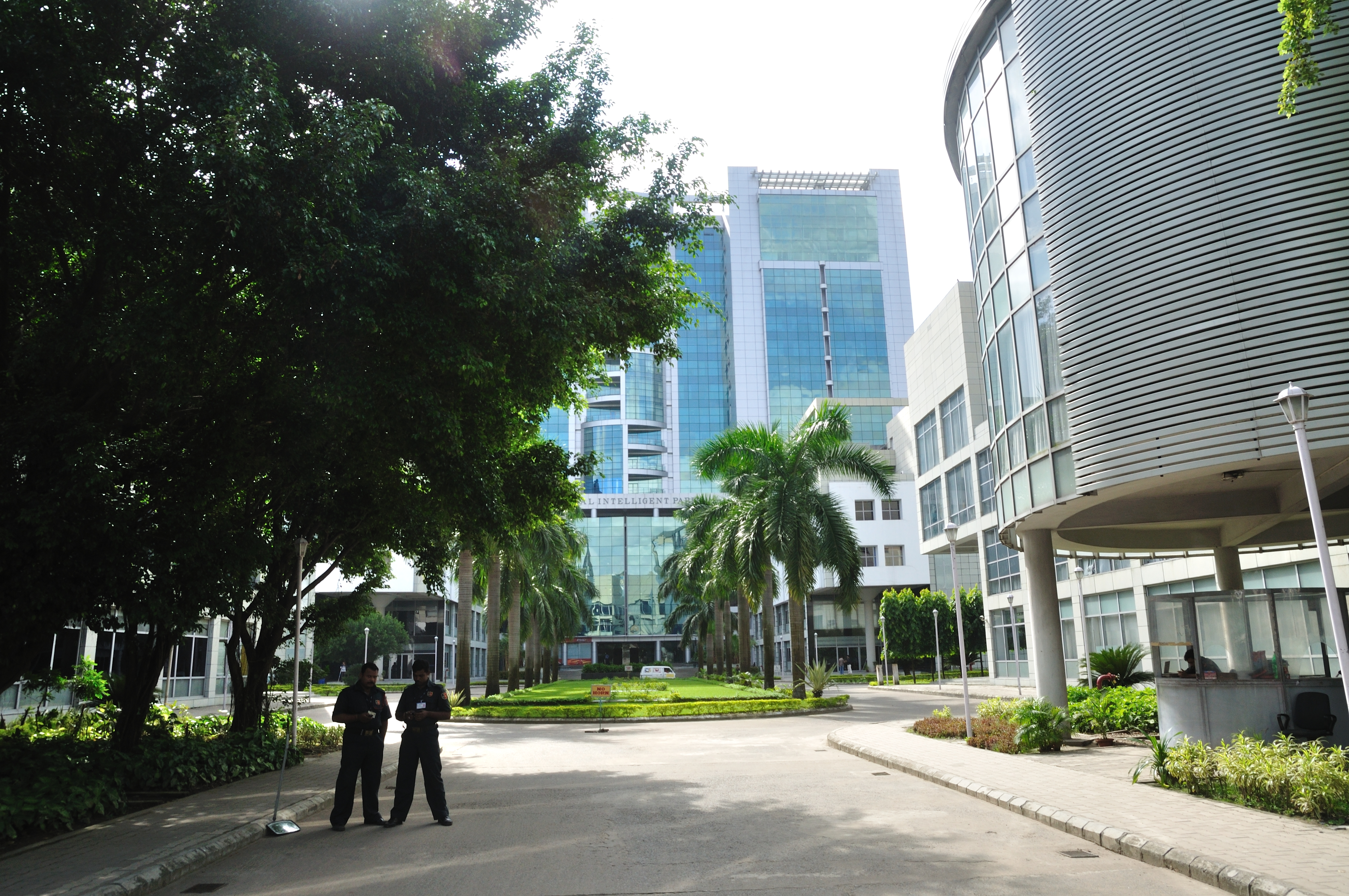
The Bengal Intelligent Park in Sector V.

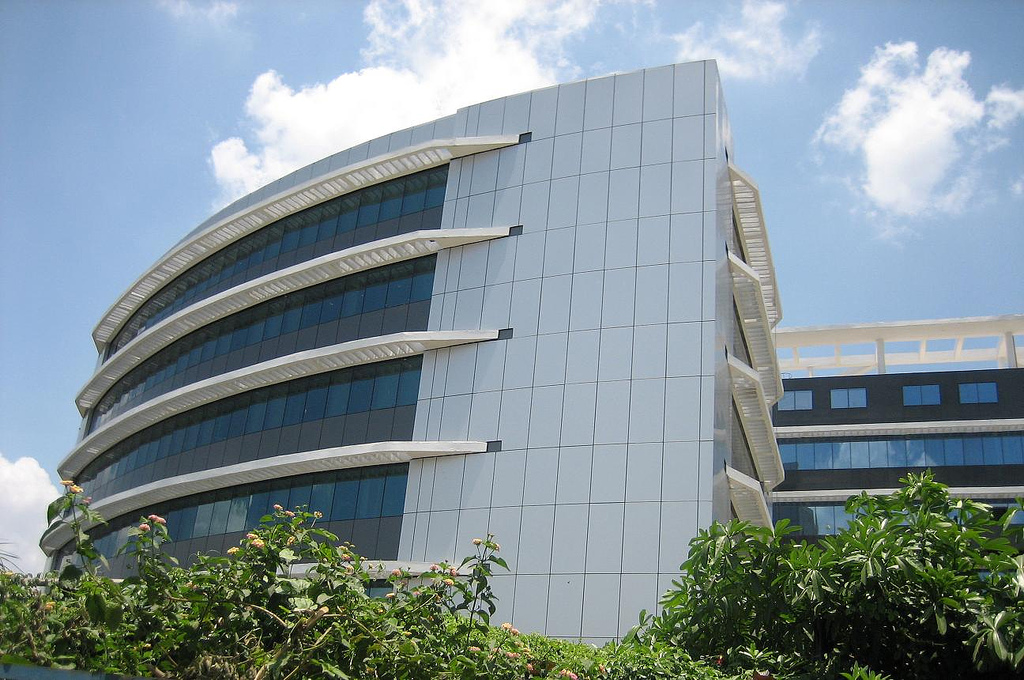
The Cognizant Technology Solutions office in Sector V.

People are mainly engaged in farming, fishing and other agricultural activities. The average size of agricultural landholdings is about 3.2 Bighas. North 24 Parganas is one of the economically developed districts of West Bengal, but there is chronic poverty in the southern half of the district (the Sundarbans area).

IT Hub

The information technology hub of Kolkata is at this district, which is the centre of some of the notable IT/ITES Indian and multinational companies. Approximately 1,500 companies have their offices in Sector V. Majority of the corporate offices are situated in Sector V and Sector III. Around 3.5 Lakh (by 2017) people are employed in Salt Lake City.

== Divisions ==
=== Administrative subdivisions ===
Administrative Map of North 24 Parganas

The district comprises five subdivisions: Barrackpore, Barasat Sadar, Basirhat, Bangaon and Bidhannagar.

- Barrackpore Subdivision consists of 16 municipalities (Kanchrapara, Halisahar, Naihati, Bhatpara, Garulia, Barrackpore, North Barrackpur, New Barrackpur, Titagarh, Khardaha, Panihati, Kamarhati, Baranagar, Dum Dum, North Dumdum and South Dumdum (25 Wards)) and 2 community development blocks: Barrackpore I and Barrackpore II.
- Barasat Sadar Subdivision consists of 5 municipalities (Barasat, Habra, Ashoknagar Kalyangarh, Madhyamgram, and Gobardanga) and 7 community development blocks: Barasat I, Barasat II, Amdanga, Deganga, Habra I and Habra II
- Bongaon Subdivision, consists of Bangaon municipality and 3 community development blocks: Bagdah, Bangaon and Gaighata.
- Basirhat Subdivision consists of 3 municipalities (Basirhat, Baduria and Taki) and 10 community development blocks: Baduria, Basirhat I, Basirhat II, Haroa, Hasnabad, Hingalganj, Minakhan, Sandeshkhali I, Sandeshkhali II, Swarupnagar.
- Bidhannagar Subdivision consists of Bidhannagar Municipal Corporation, South Dum Dum Municipality (10 wards) and one community development block: Rajarhat.

Barasat is the district headquarters. There are 35 police stations, 22 development blocks, 27 municipalities, 200 gram panchayats and 1599 villages in this district.

Other than municipality area, each subdivision contains community development blocks which in turn are divided into rural areas and census towns. In total there are 48 urban units: 27 municipalities and 20 census towns and 1 cantonment board.

==== Barrackpore subdivision ====
- 16 municipalities: Kanchrapara, Halisahar, Naihati, Bhatpara, Garulia, Barrackpore, North Barrackpur, New Barrackpur, Titagarh, Khardaha, Panihati, Kamarhati, Baranagar, Dum Dum, North Dumdum and South Dumdum.
- One Cantonment Board: Barrackpur Cantonment.
- One census town: Ichhapur Defence Estate.
- Barrackpore I (Community development block) consists of rural areas with 8 gram panchayats and three census towns: Jetia, Garshyamnagar and Kaugachhi.
- Barrackpore II (Community development block) consists of rural areas with 6 gram panchayats and six census towns: Jafarpur, Talbandha, Muragachha, Patulia, Ruiya and Chandpur.
- Panchayet: Duttapukur

==== Barasat Sadar subdivision ====
- 5 municipalities: Barasat, Habra, Ashoknagar Kalyangarh, Madhyamgram and Gobardanga.
- Barasat I (Community development block) consists of rural areas with 9 gram panchayats and 1 census town: Duttapukur.
- Barasat II (Community development block) consists of rural areas only with 7 gram panchayats.
- Amdanga (Community development block) consists of rural areas only with 8 gram panchayats.
- Deganga (Community development block) consists of rural areas only with 13 gram panchayats.
- Habra I (Community development block) consists of rural areas with 7 gram panchayats and 3 census towns: Nokpul, Maslandapur and Sadpur.
- Habra II (Community development block) consists of rural areas with 8 gram panchayats and 2 census towns: Bara Bamonia and Guma.
- Rajarhat (Community development block) (now shifted to Bidhannagar Subdivision) consists of rural areas with 6 gram panchayats (after Mahishbathan II gram panchayat was shifted to Bidhannagar Municipal Corporation, number of gram panchayats became 5) and 1 census town: Raigachhi.

==== Bangaon subdivision ====
- 1 municipality: Bangaon.
- Bagdah (Community development block) consists of rural areas only with 9 gram panchayats.
- Bangaon (Community development block) consists of rural areas only with 16 gram panchayats.
- Gaighata (Community development block) consists of rural areas with 13 gram panchayats and 7 census towns: Chandpara (7,113), Chhekati (4,995), Sonatikiri (6,919), Dhakuria (10,165), Chikanpara (9,594), Shimulpur (20,803) and Bara (5,172).

==== Basirhat subdivision ====
- Three municipalities: Basirhat, Baduria and Taki.
- Baduria (Community development block) consists of rural areas only with 14 gram panchayats.
- Basirhat I (Community development block) consists of rural areas only with 7 gram panchayats.
- Basirhat II (Community development block) consists of rural areas with 9 gram panchayats and one census town: Dhanyakuria.
- Haroa (Community development block) consists of rural areas only with 8 gram panchayats.
- Hasnabad (Community development block) consists of rural areas only with 9 gram panchayats.
- Hingalganj (Community development block) consists of rural areas only with 9 gram panchayats.
- Minakhan (Community development block) consists of rural areas only with 8 gram panchayats.
- Sandeshkhali I (Community development block) consists of rural areas only with 8 gram panchayats.
- Sandeshkhali II (Community development block) consists of rural areas only with 8 gram panchayats.
- Swarupnagar (Community development block) consists of rural areas only with 10 gram panchayats.

==== Bidhannagar subdivision ====
This subdivision consists of the Bidhannagar Municipal Corporation.

- Rajarhat (Community development block) is also shifted to this subdivision now.

== Assembly constituencies ==
As per order of the Delimitation Commission in respect of the delimitation of constituencies in the West Bengal, the district is divided into 33 assembly constituencies:

No.	Constituency	Lok Sabha	MLA	2026 Winner	2024 Lead
94	Bagdah (SC)	Bangaon	Soma Thakur	Bharatiya Janata Party	Bharatiya Janata Party
95	Bangaon Uttar (SC)	Bangaon	Ashok Kirtania	Bharatiya Janata Party	Bharatiya Janata Party
96	Bangaon Dakshin (SC)	Bangaon	Swapan Majumder	Bharatiya Janata Party	Bharatiya Janata Party
97	Gaighata (SC)	Bangaon	Subrata Thakur	Bharatiya Janata Party	Bharatiya Janata Party
98	Swarupnagar (SC)	Bangaon	Bina Mondal	Trinamool Congress	Trinamool Congress
99	Baduria	Basirhat	Burhanul Mukaddim	Trinamool Congress	Trinamool Congress
100	Habra	Barasat	Debdas Mondal	Bharatiya Janata Party	Bharatiya Janata Party
101	Ashoknagar	Barasat	Sumay Hira	Bharatiya Janata Party	Trinamool Congress
102	Amdanga	Barrackpore	Kasem Siddiqui	Trinamool Congress	Trinamool Congress
103	Bijpur	Barrackpore	Sudipta Das	Bharatiya Janata Party	Trinamool Congress
104	Naihati	Barrackpore	Sumitro Chatterjee	Bharatiya Janata Party	Trinamool Congress
105	Bhatpara	Barrackpore	Pawan Singh	Bharatiya Janata Party	Bharatiya Janata Party
106	Jagatdal	Barrackpore	Rajesh Kumar	Bharatiya Janata Party	Trinamool Congress
107	Noapara	Barrackpore	Arjun Singh	Bharatiya Janata Party	Trinamool Congress
108	Barrackpore	Barrackpore	Kaustav Bagchi	Bharatiya Janata Party	Trinamool Congress
109	Khardaha	Dum Dum	Kalyan Chakraborty	Bharatiya Janata Party	Trinamool Congress
110	Dum Dum Uttar	Dum Dum	Sourav Sikder	Bharatiya Janata Party	Trinamool Congress
111	Panihati	Dum Dum	Ratna Debnath	Bharatiya Janata Party	Trinamool Congress
112	Kamarhati	Dum Dum	Madan Mitra	Trinamool Congress	Trinamool Congress
113	Baranagar	Dum Dum	Sajal Ghosh	Bharatiya Janata Party	Trinamool Congress
114	Dum Dum	Dum Dum	Arijit Bakshi	Bharatiya Janata Party	Trinamool Congress
115	Rajarhat New Town	Barasat	Piyush Kanodia	Bharatiya Janata Party	Trinamool Congress
116	Bidhannagar	Barasat	Sharadwat Mukhopadhyay	Bharatiya Janata Party	Bharatiya Janata Party
117	Rajarhat Gopalpur	Dum Dum	Tarunjyoti Tiwari	Bharatiya Janata Party	Trinamool Congress
118	Madhyamgram	Barasat	Rathin Ghosh	Trinamool Congress	Trinamool Congress
119	Barasat	Barasat	Shankar Chatterjee	Bharatiya Janata Party	Trinamool Congress
120	Deganga	Barasat	Anisur Rahaman	Trinamool Congress	Trinamool Congress
121	Haroa	Basirhat	Abdul Maten Muhammad	Trinamool Congress	Trinamool Congress
122	Minakhan (SC)	Basirhat	Usha Rani Mondal	Trinamool Congress	Trinamool Congress
123	Sandeshkhali (ST)	Basirhat	Sanat Sardar	Bharatiya Janata Party	Bharatiya Janata Party
124	Basirhat Dakshin	Basirhat	Surajit Mitra	Trinamool Congress	Trinamool Congress
125	Basirhat Uttar	Basirhat	Tauseffur Rahaman	Trinamool Congress	Trinamool Congress
126	Hingalganj (SC)	Basirhat	Rekha Patra	Bharatiya Janata Party	Trinamool Congress

- Bagdah, Bangaon Uttar and Dakshin, Gaighata, Swarupnagar, Minakhan and Hingalganj constituencies are reserved for Scheduled Castes (SC) candidates while Sandeshkhali is reserved for Schedule Tribe (ST).
- Bagdaha, Bangaon Uttar and Dakshin, Gaighata, Swarupnagar, and Kalyani and Haringhata (two assembly constituencies from Nadia) assembly constituencies form the Bangaon (Lok Sabha constituency) which is reserved for Schedule Caste (SC) candidate.
- Habra, Ashoknagar, Rajarhat-New Town, Bidhannagar, Madhyagram, Barasat, Deganga assembly constituencies form the Barasat (Lok Sabha constituency).
- Khardaha, Dum Dum, Dum Dum Uttar, Panihati, Kamarhati, Baranagar, Rajarhat Gopalpur assembly constituencies form the Dum Dum (Lok Sabha constituency).
- Amdanga, Bijpur, Naihati, Bhatpara, Jagatdal, Noapara, Barrackpore assembly constituencies form the Barrackpore (Lok Sabha constituency).
- Baduria, Haroa, Minakhan, Sandeshkhali, Basirhat Uttar, Basirhat Dakshin, Hingalganj constituencies are part of the Basirhat (Lok Sabha constituency).

== Education ==
=== Universities ===
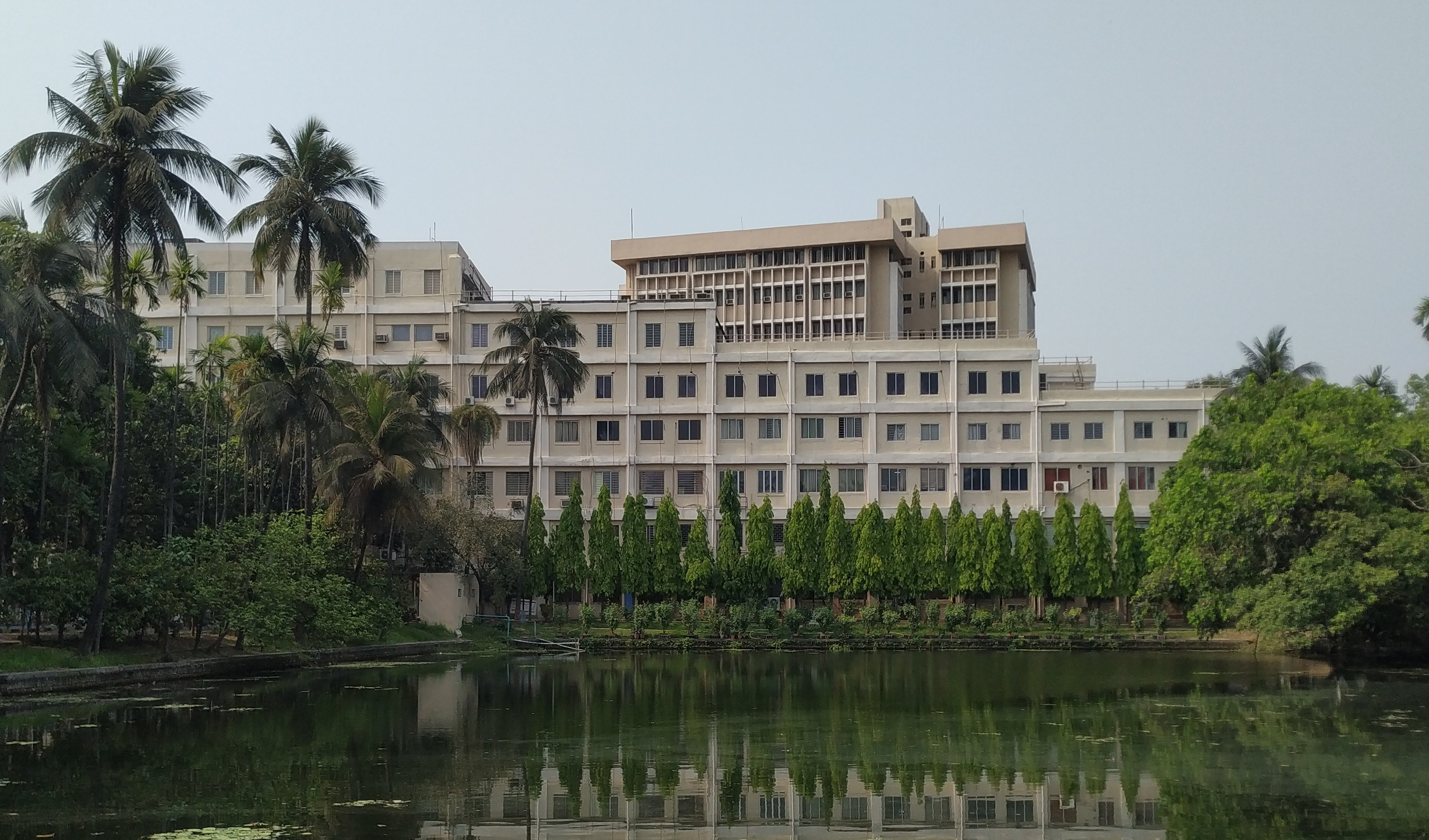
Indian Statistical Institute, Baranagar

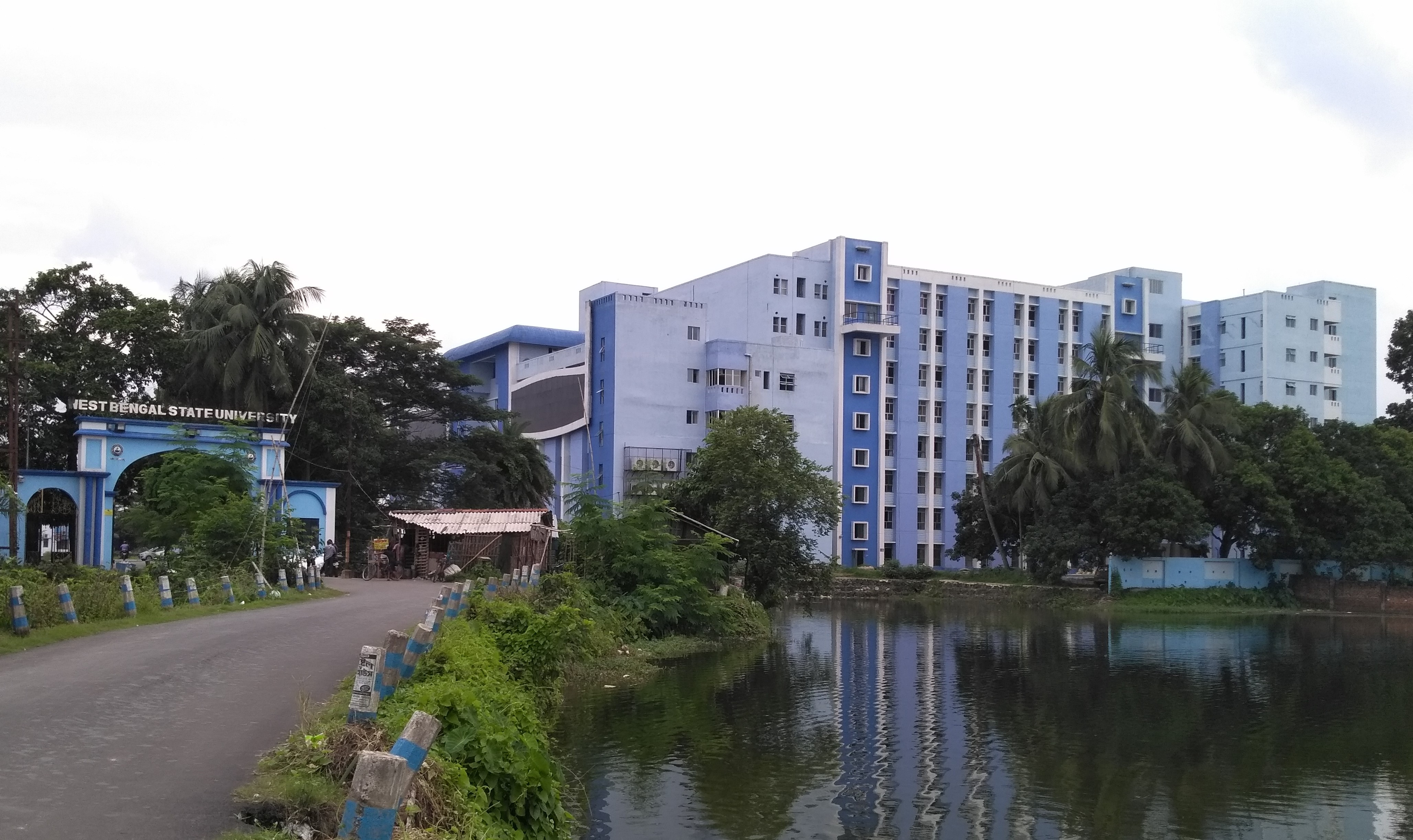
West Bengal State University, Barasat, the general degree university of the district

- Adamas University
- Aliah University
- Amity University
- Brainware University
- Indian Statistical Institute
- Jadavpur University (Second Campus)
- JIS University
- Maulana Abul Kalam Azad University of Technology
- Netaji Subhas Open University
- Sister Nivedita University
- St. Xavier's University, Kolkata
- Techno India University
- University of Calcutta (Technological Campus)
- West Bengal State University

=== Colleges ===
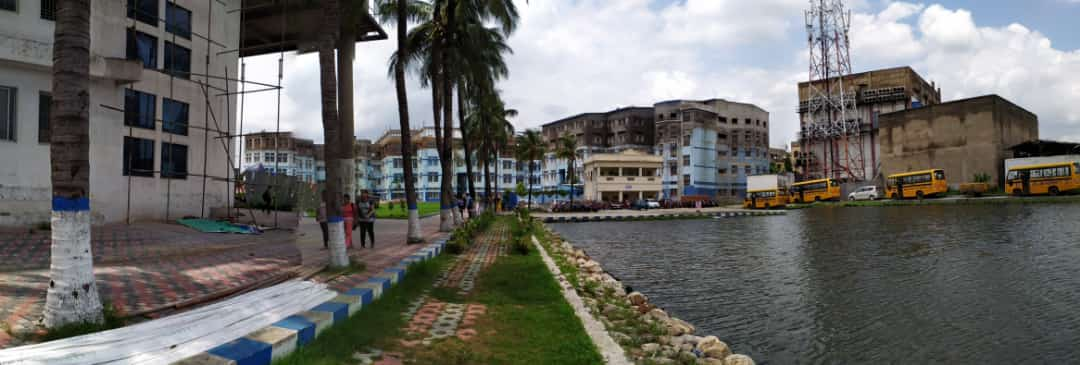
Narula Institute of Technology

- Acharya Prafulla Chandra College
- Barasat College
- Barasat Government College
- Barasat Government Medical College and Hospital
- Basirhat College
- Bidhannagar College
- Brahmananda Keshab Chandra College
- College of Medicine & Sagore Dutta Hospital
- Dinabandhu Mahavidyalay
- Gobardanga Hindu College
- Government College of Engineering and Leather Technology
- Guru Nanak Institute of Dental Sciences and Research
- Guru Nanak Institute of Technology
- Institute of Engineering and Management
- Narula Institute of Technology
- Prasanta Chandra Mahalanobis Mahavidyalaya
- Ramakrishna Mission Vivekananda Centenary College
- Sree Chaitanya College

=== Schools ===
- Barasat, Aditya Academy Secondary School
- Barrackpore Government High School
- Basirhat High School
- Baranagar Central Modern School
- Barrackpore Kendriya Vidyalaya
- Sodepur High School
- St. Xavier's Institution (Panihati)

== Culture ==
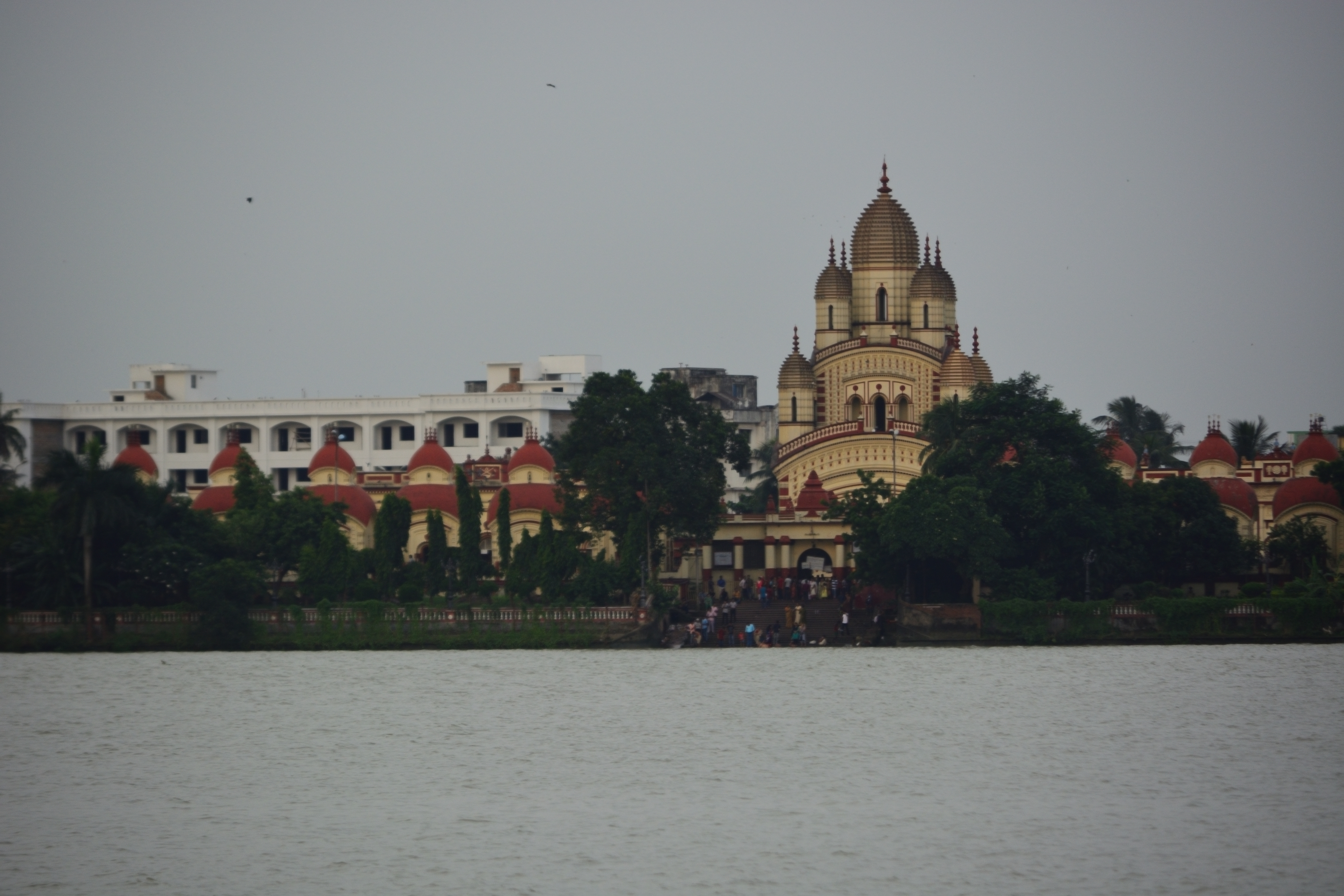
Dakshineswar Kali Temple

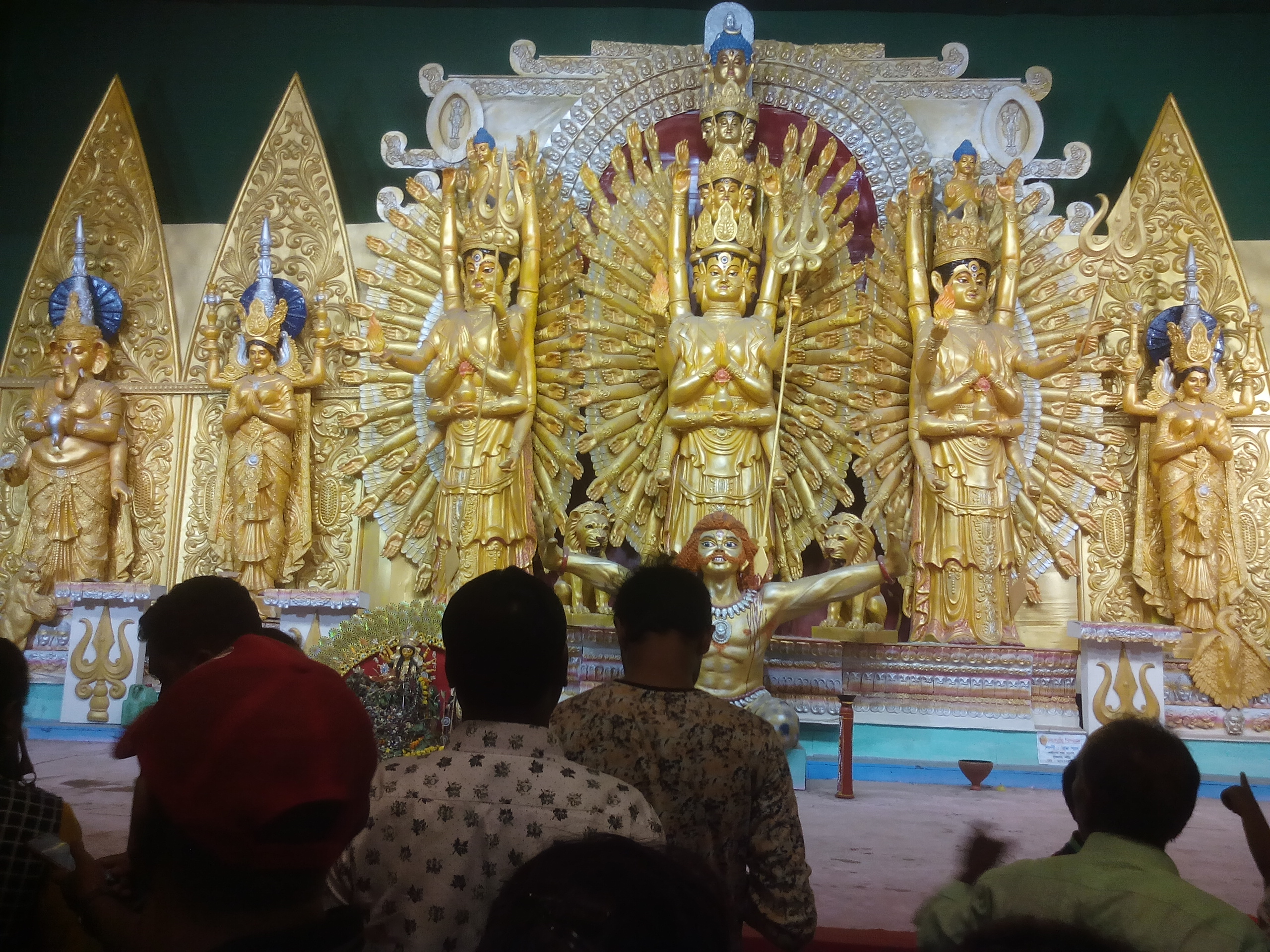
Durga idol at a pandel in Baranagar

This district is rich in culture. Many famous places like Dakshineswar Kali Temple, Naihati Boro Maa Kali Temple, Basirhat Dakshina Kali Temple, Baranagar Math (first monastery of Ramakrishna Order) are situated in this district.

Many places of this district are famous for festivals –

The scale and intensity of Durga Puja celebrations in Basirhat are among the largest in North 24 Parganas district. In terms of the number of Durga Puja pandals, the city ranks fourth in West Bengal, following Kolkata, Asansol-Durgapur, and Siliguri. Other cities like Baranagar, Barrackpore, Bongaon are also organise many Durga Pujas.

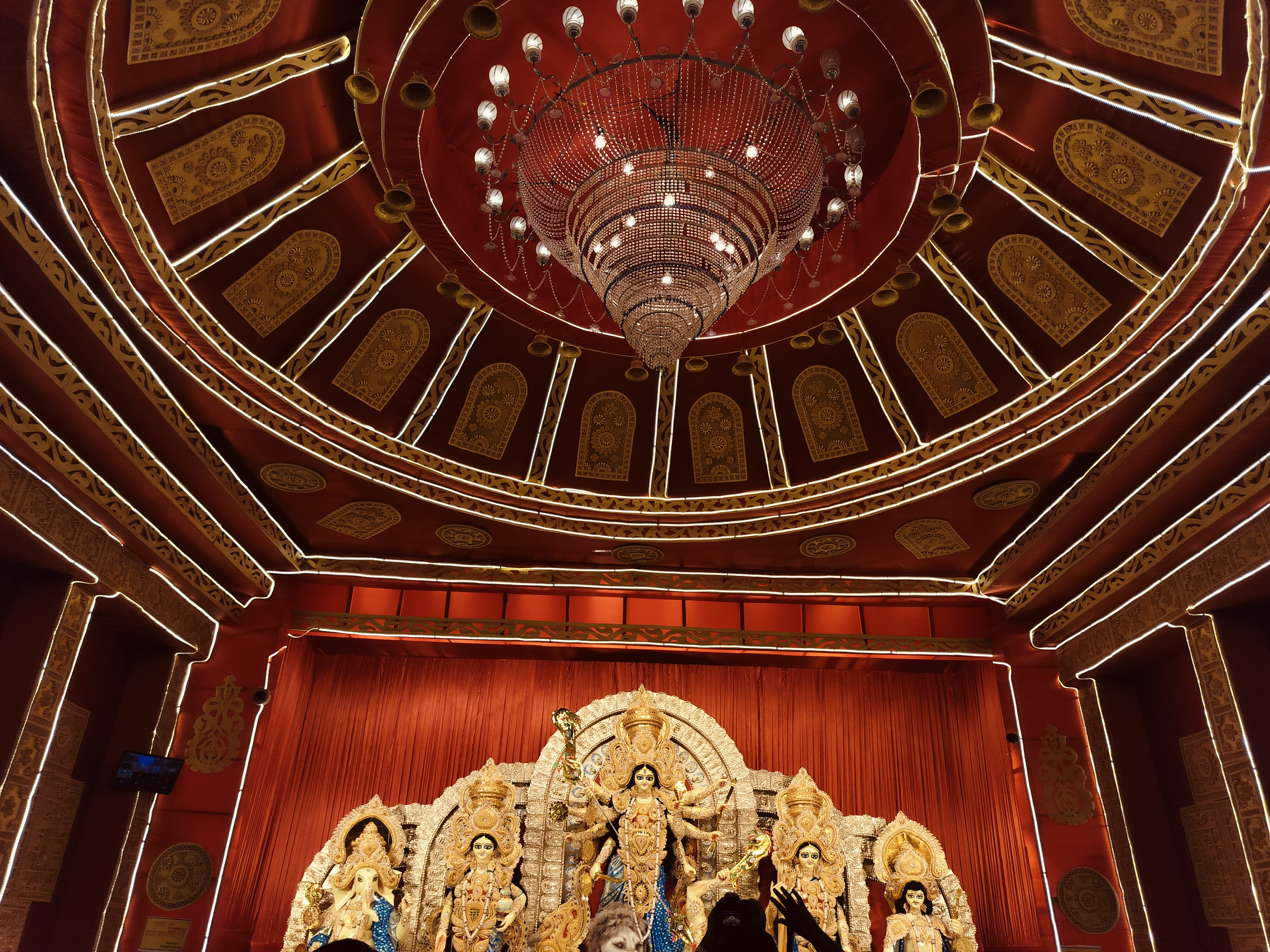
Grand decorations reflecting the richness of art and culture of Basirhat's Durgapuja in Sobuj Sangha.

Kali Puja of Barasat, Madhyamgram and Naihati are also quite famous in whole West Bengal because of its large scale celebration. Habra, Barrackpore, Basirhat, Belgharia also celebrates Kali Puja vibrantly.

Ashoknagar Kalyangarh is famous for Jagatdhatri puja.

== Transport ==
=== Railways ===
The electrified suburban rail network of the ER is extensive and penetrates far and deep into the neighbouring districts of Kolkata, South 24 Parganas, Nadia, Howrah, Hooghly etc.

The Circular Rail encircles the entire city of Kolkata, and also used to provide an offshoot to connect the Dum Dum Airport, but now it is limited up to Dum Dum Cantonment. Jessore Road and Biman Bandar railway stations are closed for the construction work of Noapara–Barasat metro corridor (Yellow Line).

Kolkata Metro is also a transport medium for parts of the district. Four stations of Blue Line are located here, Dum Dum metro station at Dum Dum, Baranagar metro station at Baranagar, Dakshineswar metro station at Dakshineswar and Noapara metro station at Noapara.

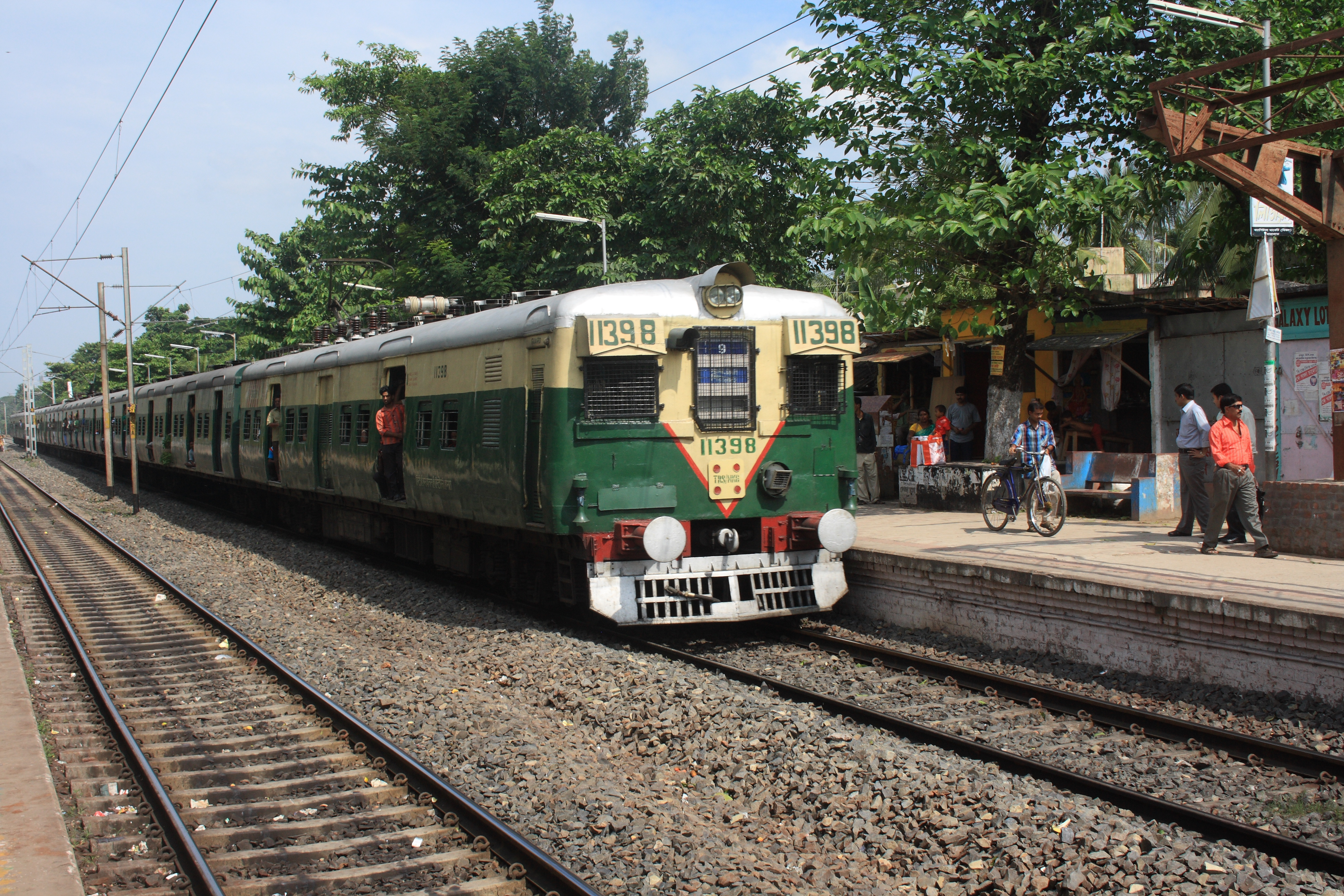
Kolkata Suburban EMU Train

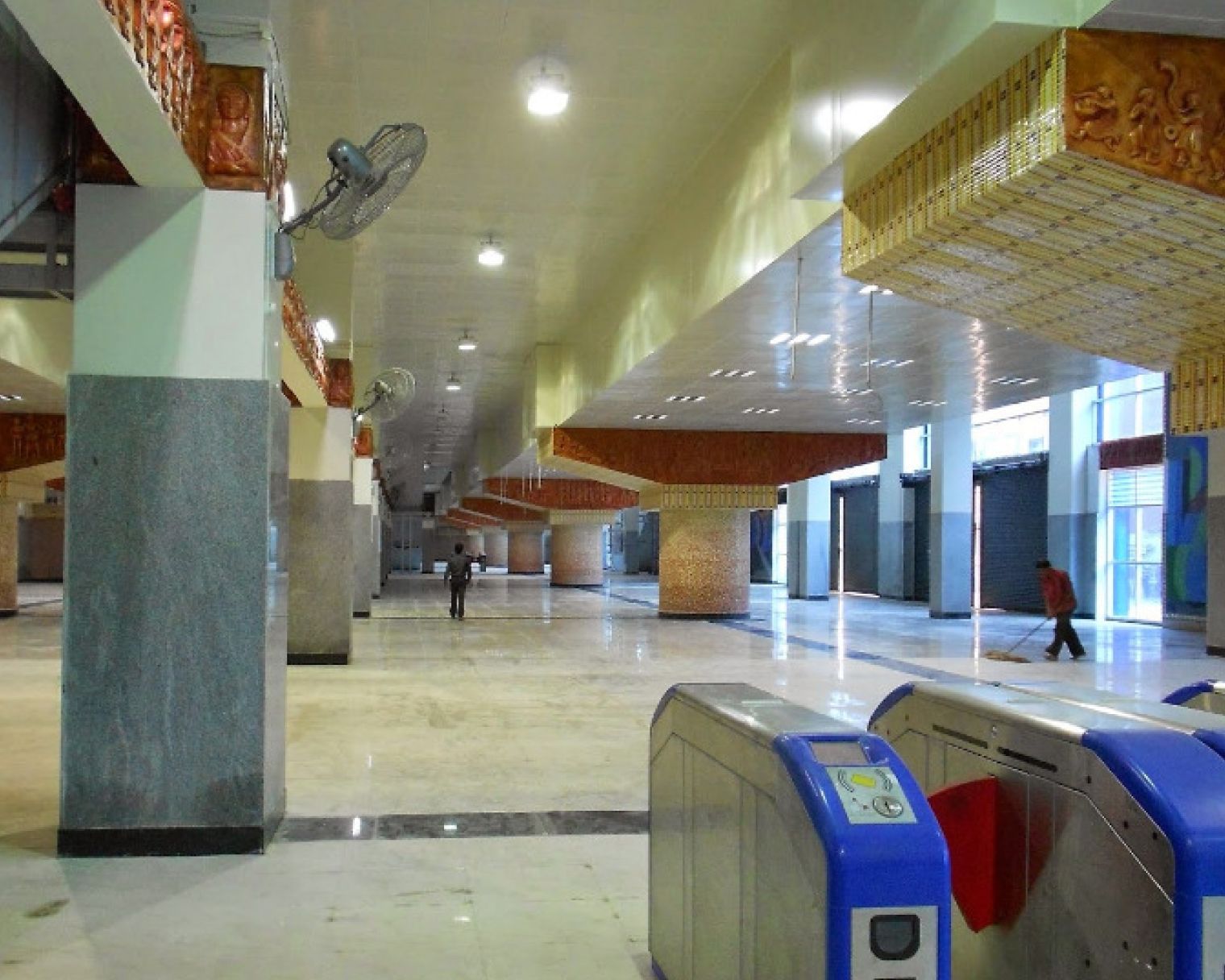
Kolkata Metro's Noapara metro station at Noapara, Baranagar

=== Airports ===
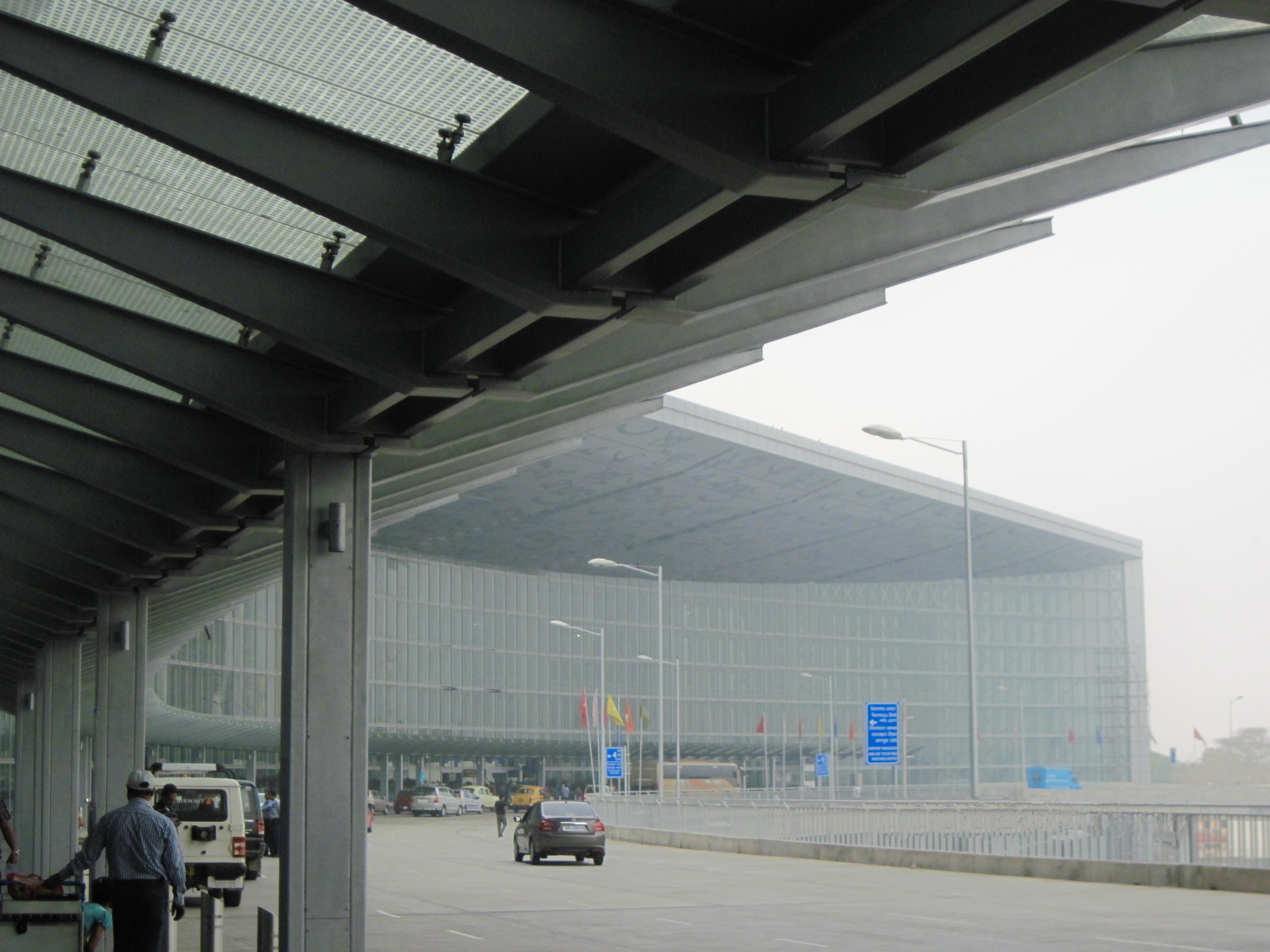
Cityside view of the new Integrated Terminal of Netaji Subhash Chandra Bose International Airport

The Netaji Subhash Chandra Bose International Airport (IATA code:CCU), which is at Dum Dum (previously known as Dum Dum Airport) in North 24 Parganas, is the only airport serving the city Kolkata. It operates both domestic and international flights. It is a gateway to North-East India, Bangkok, and Bangladesh. The number of people using the airport has consistently increased over the last few years.

=== Roadways ===
The road network is fairly well developed. Sparsed across by state-highways, it provides a convenient means of transport. NH 12 connects the district with northern and southern region of the state and its sub road NH 112 connects the district headquarter Barasat with the border town Bangaon and Petrapole, the largest land port of India.

== Demographics ==
Historical population
Year	Pop.	±% p.a.
1901	1,016,001	—
1911	1,166,158	+1.39%
1921	1,239,719	+0.61%
1931	1,357,831	+0.91%
1941	1,711,806	+2.34%
1951	2,114,097	+2.13%
1961	3,127,685	+3.99%
1971	4,207,420	+3.01%
1981	5,529,497	+2.77%
1991	7,281,881	+2.79%
2001	8,934,286	+2.07%
2011	10,009,781	+1.14%

According to the 2011 census North 24 Parganas district has a population of 10,009,781, roughly equal to the nation of Bolivia or the US state of Michigan. This gave it a ranking of second in India (out of a total of 640) and first in its state. However, in 2014 the Thane district (in Maharashtra), which had been ranked first in India in 2011, was divided into two, thus promoting North 24 Parganas District to first in India. The district has a population density of 2,463 inhabitants per square kilometre (6,380/sq mi). Its population growth rate over the decade 2001–2011 was 12.86%. North Twenty Four Parganas has a sex ratio of 949 females for every 1000 males, and a literacy rate of 84.95%. 57.28% of the population lives in urban areas. Scheduled Castes and Scheduled Tribes make up 21.67% and 2.64% of the population respectively.

- Population Density: 2959 per square km
- Sex ratio: 982 females per 1000 males
- Growth Rate (1991–2000): 24.64% (approximately 2.5% per annum)
- Literacy rate (excluding 0–6 age group), in percentage: 87.66 (highest in West Bengal).
  - Male: 93.14; Female: 81.81

=== Religion ===
Religion in North 24 Parganas district (2011 census)
1. Hinduism (73.5%)
2. Islam (25.8%)
3. Christianity (0.27%)
4. No religion (0.23%)
5. Sikhism (0.09%)
6. Buddhism (0.06%)
7. Jainism (0.04%)
8. Other religions (0.03%)

Religion in present-day North 24 Parganas district (Note: Barrackpore, Barasat and Basirhat subdivisions, along with Bongaon and Gaighata thanas of Bongaon subdivision in Jessore district.)
Religion	Population (1941)	Percentage (1941)	Population (2011)	Percentage (2011)
Hinduism	927,418	57.09%	7,396,769	73.76%
Islam	648,920	39.95%	2,584,684	25.52%
Tribal religion	41,105	2.53%	2,930	0.03%
Others (Note: Including Jainism, Christianity, Buddhism, Zoroastrianism, Judaism, Ad-Dharmis, or not stated)	6,994	0.43%	69,398	0.69%
Total Population	1,624,437	100%	10,009,781	100%

Hinduism is the main religion in the district, and especially dominates urban areas where they are nearly 90% of the population. Most Muslims are rural, and in the rural areas Hindus and Muslims are in equal proportions. In Bongaon and Sandeshkhali regions, Hindus, mainly descendants of refugees from present-day Bangladesh, dominate the rural population. But in the rest of the district, Muslims dominate the rural population.

Population by religion in CD blocks
CD Block	Hindu	Muslim	Other
Bagdah	82.00%	17.42%	0.58%
Bongaon	78.17%	20.83%	1.00%
Gaighata	93.27%	6.42%	0.31%
Swarupnagar	52.17%	47.58%	0.25%
Habra I	73.51%	25.81%	0.68%
Habra II	53.85%	45.76%	0.39%
Amdanga	41.30%	58.48%	0.22%
Barrackpur I	84.38%	14.46%	1.15%
Barrackpur II	77.71%	21.45%	0.84%
Barasat I	57.10%	42.08%	0.49%
Barasat II	25.93%	73.81%	0.26%
Deganga	28.79%	70.92%	0.29%
Baduria	34.35%	65.48%	0.17%
Basirhat I	31.24%	68.54%	0.22%
Basirhat II	29.67%	70.10%	0.23%
Haroa	38.76%	61.12%	0.12%
Rajarhat	59.41%	39.90%	0.69%
Minakhan	48.77%	50.60%	0.63%
Sandeshkhali I	69.19%	30.42%	0.39%
Sandeshkhali II	77.17%	22.27%	0.55%
Hasnabad	43.35%	56.51%	0.14%
Hingalganj	87.97%	11.82%	0.21%
Area not under any Sub-district	89.17%	9.84%	0.99%

=== Languages ===
Languages of North 24 Parganas district (2011)
1. Bengali (88.9%)
2. Hindi (7.69%)
3. Urdu (2.28%)
4. Others (1.12%)

According to the 2011 census, 88.91% of the population spoke Bengali, 7.69% Hindi and 2.28% Urdu as their first language.

== Flora and fauna ==
The district is also home to the Bibhutibhushan Wildlife Sanctuary, which was established in 1985 and has an area of 0.6 km^{2} (0.2 mi^{2}).

== Health facilities ==
- District Hospitals: 10 with 2500 beds
- Sub Divisional Hospitals: 14 with 1870 beds
- State General Hospitals: 18 with 1870 beds
- ESI Hospital: 01 with 200 beds
- Rural Hospitals: 07 with 228 beds
- Block Primary Health Centers: 15

== Notable people ==
- Troilokyanath Mukhopadhyay, writer
- Ramkamal Sen, diwan and social reformer
- Mathurmohan Biswas, Zamindar, social reformer and philanthropist
- Kshirode Prasad Vidyavinode, poet, novelist, dramatist and nationalist
- Harinath De, Indian linguist, polyglot, Indologist and an academician
- Bibhutibhushan Bandyopadhyay, writer, novelist
- Manik Bandopadhay, writer, novelist
- Mohitlal Majumdar, Poet
- Rakhaldas Bandyopadhyay, archaeologist
- Vidyadhar Bhattacharya, chief architect and city planner of Jaipur, Rajasthan.
- Rajendra Nath Mookerjee, Indian Industrialist.
- Sanghamitra Bandyopadhyay, Director Indian Statistical Institute
- Taradas Bandyopadhyay, writer, scholar
- Chittaprosad Bhattacharya, Indian political person and artist of the mid-20th century.
- Dola Banerjee, athlete
- Masudur Rahman Baidya, Indian swimmer and was the world's first physically disabled swimmer to swim across the Strait of Gibraltar.
- Rahul Banerjee, athlete
- Raj Chakraborty, Indian film director, actor, producer and politician.
- Ratan Lal Basu, Fiction Writer in English, Economist, Indologist, Yoga & Tantra Specialist
- Pramatha Nath Bose, Geologist and Paleontologist
- Pravanalini Bhandari, Indian revolutionary
- Ajoy Chakrabarty, Musician
- Abhishek Chatterjee, actor
- Biswanath Basu, actor and comedian
- Bankim Chandra Chatterjee, writer, novelist
- Sanjib Chandra Chattopadhyay, Bengali writer, poet and journalist.
- Sasipada Banerji, a teacher, social worker and leader of the Brahmo Samaj
- Jeet Ganguly, musician
- Ishwar Chandra Gupta, Bengali poet and writer
- Ujjwal Maulik, Computer Scientist
- Dinabandhu Mitra, Bengali novelist
- Barun Biswas, teacher and a social activist
- Tanmoy Bhattacharya, Politician
- Shyamal Mitra, singer, musician
- Arunoday Mondal, physician
- Samir Mondal, Indian Painter
- Samir Roychoudhury, Poet and Writer
- Satyendranath Dutta, Poet
- Shiboprosad Mukherjee, film director
- Rani Rashmoni, philanthropist
- Prabhavathi Devi Saraswathi, Bengali writer and novelist
- Ramprasad Sen, poet
- Muhammad Shahidullah, educationist, writer, philologist and linguist
- Anisuzzaman, educationist, writer, scholar
- Kamal Kumar Majumdar, writer
- Bimal Kar, writer and novelist
