= List of colleges in West Bengal =

== Colleges affiliated with University of Calcutta ==
For the list of colleges under University of Calcutta, see the article.

== Colleges affiliated with Bankura University ==
- Bankura Christian College
- Bankura Sammilani College
- Bankura Zilla Saradamani Mahila Mahavidyapith
- Barjora College
- Birsha Munda Memorial College
- Chatra Ramai Pandit Mahavidyalaya
- Chhatna Chandidas Mahavidyalaya
- Gobindaprasad Mahavidyalaya
- Indas Mahavidyalaya
- Jamini Roy College
- Kabi Jagadram Roy Government General Degree College
- Khatra Adibasi Mahavidyalaya
- Onda Thana Mahavidyalaya
- Panchmura Mahavidyalaya
- Pandit Raghunath Murmu Smriti Mahavidyalaya
- Patrasayer Mahavidyalaya
- Raipur Block Mahavidyalaya
- Ramananda College
- Saldiha College
- Saltora Netaji Centenary College
- Sonamukhi College
- Swami Dhananjoy Das Kathiababa Mahavidyalaya
- Government General Degree College, Ranibandh
- Akui Kamalabala Women's College

== Colleges affiliated with The University of Burdwan ==
- Abhedananda Mahavidyalaya
- Acharya Sukumar Sen Mahavidyalaya
- Aghorekamini Prakashchandra Mahavidyalaya
- Arambagh Girls' College
- Balagarh Bijoy Krishna Mahavidyalaya
- Bejoy Narayan Mahavidyalaya
- Bengal Law College
- Birbhum Mahavidyalaya
- Bolpur College
- Burdwan Raj College
- Chandernagore Government College
- Chandidas Mahavidyalaya
- Chandrapur College
- Dasarathi Hazra Memorial College
- Deshbandhu Mahavidyalaya
- Dr. Bhupendra Nath Dutta Smriti Mahavidyalaya
- Dr. Gourmohan Roy College
- Galsi Mahavidyalaya
- Gushkara Mahavidyalaya
- Hiralal Bhakat College
- Hooghly Mohsin College
- Hooghly Women's College

== Colleges affiliated with Kazi Nazrul University ==
- Asansol Girls' College
- Banwarilal Bhalotia College
- Bidhan Chandra College, Asansol
- St. Xavier's College, Asansol
- Kulti College
- Deshbandhu Mahavidyalaya
- Kazi Nazrul Islam Mahavidyalaya
- Triveni Devi Bhalotia College
- Raniganj Girls' College
- Durgapur Government College
- Michael Madhusudan Memorial College
- Durgapur Women's College
- Durgapur College of Commerce and Science
- Khandra College
- Pandaveswar College

== Colleges affiliated with University of Kalyani ==
- Asannagar Madan Mohan Tarkalankar College
- Berhampore College
- Berhampore Girls' College
- Bethuadahari College
- Chakdaha College
- Chapra Bangaljhi Mahavidyalaya
- Chapra Government College
- Domkal Girls' College
- Dr. B.R. Ambedkar College
- Dukhulal Nibaran Chandra College
- Dumkal College
- Dwijendralal College
- G.D.College
- Haringhata Mahavidyalaya
- Hazi A.K. Khan College
- Jalangi Mahavidyalaya
- Jangipur College
- Jatindra Rajendra Mahavidyalaya
- Kaliganj Government College
- Kalyani Mahavidyalaya
- Kanchrapara College
- Kandi Raj College
- Karimpur Pannadevi College
- Krishnagar Government College
- Krishnagar Women's College
- Krishnath College
- Lalgola College
- Muragacha Government College
- Murshidabad Adarsha Mahavidyalaya
- Muzaffar Ahmed Mahavidyalaya
- Nabadwip Vidyasagar College
- Nabagram Amar Chand Kundu College
- Nagar College
- Nur Mohammad Smriti Mahavidyalaya
- Panchthupi Haripada Gouribala College
- Plassey College
- Pritilata Mahila Mahavidyalaya
- Prof. Sayed Nurul Hasan College
- Raja Birendra Chandra College
- Ranaghat College
- Rani Dhanya Kumari College
- Sagardighi Kamada Kinkar Smriti Mahavidyalaya
- Santipur College
- Srikrishna College
- Sripat Singh College
- Sewnarayan Rameswar Fatepuria College
- Subhas Chandra Bose Centenary College
- Sudhiranjan Lahiri Mahavidyalaya
- Tehatta Government College
- Tagore School of Rural Development and Agriculture Management
- Snehangshu Kanta Acharya Institute of Law
- J.R.S.E.T. College of Law
- Mohammad Abdul Bari Institute of Juridical Science

== Colleges affiliated with Sidho-Kanho-Birsha University ==
- Achhruram Memorial College
- Ananda Marga College
- Arsha College
- Balarampur College
- Bandwan Mahavidyalaya
- Barabazar Bikram Tudu Memorial College
- Bikramjit Goswami Memorial College
- Chitta Mahato Memorial College
- Government General Degree College, Manbazar II
- J. K. College
- Kashipur Michael Madhusudhan Mahavidyalaya
- Kotshila Mahavidyalaya
- Mahatma Gandhi College, Purulia
- Manbhum Mahavidyalaya
- Netaji Subhash Ashram Mahavidyalaya
- Nistarini Women's College
- Panchakot Mahavidyalaya
- Raghunathpur College
- Ramananda Centenary College
- Santaldih College
- Sitaram Mahato Memorial College

== Colleges affiliated with Vidyasagar University ==
- Ambigeria Government College
- Bajkul Milani Mahavidyalaya
- Belda College
- Bhatter College
- Chaipat S.P.B. Mahavidyalaya
- Chandrakona Vidyasagar Mahavidyalaya
- Debra Thana Sahid Kshudiram Smriti Mahavidyalaya
- Deshapran Mahavidyalaya
- Egra Sarada Shashi Bhusan College
- Garhbeta College
- Gourav Guin Memorial College
- Government General Degree College, Gopiballavpur-II
- Government General Degree College, Mohanpur
- Haldia Government College
- Haldia Law College
- Hijli College
- Jhargram Raj College
- Jhargram Raj College (Girls' Wing)
- K.D. College of Commerce and General Studies
- Keshiary Government College
- Kharagpur College
- Khejuri College
- Lalgarh Government College
- Maharaja Nandakumar Mahavidyalaya
- Mahishadal Girls' College
- Mahishadal Raj College
- Midnapore College
- Midnapore Law College
- MIES R.M. Law College
- Moyna College
- Mugberia Gangadhar Mahavidyalaya
- Narajole Raj College
- Nayagram Pandit Raghunath Murmu Government College
- Oriental Institute of Science and Technology, Midnapore
- Panskura Banamali College
- Pingla Thana Mahavidyalaya
- Prabhat Kumar College
- Rabindra Bharati Mahavidyalaya
- Raja Narendra Lal Khan Women's College
- Ramnagar College
- Sabang Sajanikanta Mahavidyalaya
- Salboni Government College
- Sankrail Anil Biswas Smriti Mahavidyalaya
- Santal Bidroha Sardha Satabarsiki Mahavidyalaya
- Seva Bharati Mahavidyalaya
- Shahid Matangini Hazra Government College for Women
- Siddhinath Mahavidyalaya
- Silda Chandra Sekhar College
- Sitananda College
- Subarnarekha Mahavidyalaya
- Sukumar Sengupta Mahavidyalaya
- Swarnamoyee Jogendranath Mahavidyalaya
- Tamralipta Mahavidyalaya
- Vidyasagar Institute of Health
- Vidyasagar School of Social Work
- Vivekananda Mission Mahavidyalaya
- Vivekananda Satavarshiki Mahavidyalaya
- Yogoda Satsanga Palpara Mahavidyalaya

== Colleges affiliated with West Bengal State University ==
The column contains the list of colleges under West Bengal State University

- Acharya Prafulla Chandra College, New Barrackpore
- Ali Yavar Jung National Institute of Speech and Hearing Disabilities
- Amdanga Jugal Kishore Mahavidyalaya
- Bamanpukur Humayun Kabir Mahavidyalaya
- Banipur Mahila Mahavidyalaya
- Barasat College
- Barasat Government College
- Barrackpore Rastraguru Surendranath College
- Basirhat College
- Bhairab Ganguly College
- Bidhannagar College
- Bikashayan, 40, Bonhoogly Govt Colony, Alambazar
- Brahmananda Keshab Chandra College
- Chandraketugarh Sahidullah Smriti Mahavidyalaya
- Derozio Memorial College
- Dinabandhu Mahavidyalay
- Dr. A.P.J. Abdul Kalam Government College
- Dr. B. R. Ambedkar Satabarshiki Mahavidyalaya
- Dum Dum Motijheel Rabindra Mahavidyalaya
- Dum Dum Motijheel College
- East Calcutta Girls' College
- Gobardanga Hindu College
- GLF Business School, Sector I, Salt Lake
- Hingalganj Mahavidyalaya
- Hiralal Majumdar Memorial College for Women
- Kalinagar Mahavidyalaya
- Kingston College of Science
- Kingston Law College
- Mahadevananda Mahavidyalaya
- Morning Star College
- Mrinalini Dutta Mahavidyapith
- Maharajah's College, (Balisa) Bira
- Naba Barrackpore Prafulla Chandra Mahavidyalaya
- Nahata Jogendranath Mandal Smriti Mahavidyalaya
- National Institute for the Mentally Handicapped, B.T. Road, Bon Hoogly
- Netaji Satabarshiki Mahavidyalaya
- P. N. Das College
- P. R. Thakur Government College
- Panihati Mahavidyalaya
- Post Graduate Government Institute for Physical Education
- Prasanta Chandra Mahalanobis Mahavidyalaya
- Ramakrishna Sarada Mission Vivekananda Vidyabhavan
- Ramakrishna Mission Vivekananda Centenary College
- Rishi Bankim Chandra College
- Sarojini Naidu College for Women
- Saheed Nurul Islam Mahavidyalaya
- Sarada Ma Girls' College
- Sree Chaitanya College
- Sree Chaitanya Mahavidyalaya
- Taki Government College
- Vivekananda College
- Institute of Science and Advanced Research

== Colleges affiliated with Cooch Behar Panchanan Barma University ==
- Acharya Brojendra Nath Seal College
- Bakshirhat Mahavidyalaya
- Baneswar Sarathibala Mahavidyalaya
- Cooch Behar College
- Dewanhat Mahavidyalaya
- Dinhata College
- Thakur Panchanan Mahila Mahavidyalaya
- Mathabhanga College
- Netaji Subhas Mahavidyalaya
- Mekliganj College
- Sitalkuchi College
- Government College of Physical Education for Women
- Baneswar Sarathibala Mahavidyalaya
- Ghoksadanga Birendranath Mahavidyalaya
- Bakshirhat Mahavidyalaya
- Dewanhat Mahavidyalaya
- Madhusudan Hore Mahavidyalaya
- Tufanganj Mahavidyalaya

== Colleges affiliated with University of North Bengal ==
- Acharya Prafulla Chandra Roy Government College
- Alipurduar College
- Alipurduar Mahila Mahavidyalaya
- Ananda Chandra College
- Ananda Chandra College of Commerce
- Banarhat Kartik Oraon Hindi Government College
- Bijanbari Degree College
- Birpara College
- Birsa Munda College
- Chopra Kamala Paul Smriti Mahavidyalaya
- Cluny Women's College
- Darjeeling Government College
- Dhupguri Girls' College
- Falakata College
- Ghoom-Jorebunglow Degree College
- Government General Degree College, Gorubathan
- Government General Degree College, Pedong
- Gyan Jyoti College
- Indian Institute of Legal Studies
- Islampur College
- Jalpaiguri Law College
- Kalimpong College
- Kalipada Ghosh Tarai Mahavidyalaya
- Kurseong College
- Lilabati Mahavidyalaya
- Maynaguri College
- Munshi Premchand Mahavidyalaya
- Nakshalbari College
- Model B.P.Ed. College
- Nani Bhattacharya Smarak Mahavidyalaya
- North Bengal St. Xavier's College
- P.D. Women's College
- Parimal Mitra Smriti Mahavidyalaya
- Pijushkanti Mukherjee Mahavidyalaya
- Rajganj College
- saheed kshudiram college
- St Joseph's College, Darjeeling
- Salesian College, Darjeeling
- Samuktala Sidhu Kanhu College
- Siliguri College
- Siliguri College of Commerce
- Siliguri Mahila Mahavidyalaya
- Sonada Degree College
- Southfield College
- Sukanta Mahavidyalaya
- Suniti Academy
- Surya Sen Mahavidyalaya
- Vivekananda College, Alipurduar
- University B.T. & Evening College

== Colleges affiliated with University of Gour Banga ==
- Balurghat College
- Balurghat Law College
- Balurghat Mahila Mahavidyalaya
- Buniadpur Mahavidyalaya
- Chanchal College
- Dr. Meghnad Saha College
- Gangarampur B.Ed College
- Gangarampur College
- Gazole Mahavidyalaya
- Gour Mahavidyalaya
- Jamini Majumdar Memorial College
- Kaliachak College
- Kaliyaganj College
- Kumarganj College
- Kushmandi Government College
- Malda College
- Manikchak College
- Nathaniyal Murmu Memorial College
- Pakuahat Degree College
- Raiganj Surendranath Mahavidyalaya
- Samsi College
- Shree Agrasen Mahavidyalaya
- South Malda College

== See also ==
- List of institutions of higher education in India
- List of schools in India
