= Dinabandhu Mahavidyalay =

College in Bongaon, West Bengal

- Type: Undergraduate college
- Established: 1947
- Affiliations: West Bengal State University
- President: Sri Aniruddha Bhattacharya
- Principal: Dr. Biswajit Ghosh
- Location: Bongaon, West Bengal, 743235, India; 23.0563675°N 88.8264631°E
- Campus: Urban
- Website: www.dinabandhumahavidyalaya.org

- Location within West Bengal Location within India

Dinabandhu Mahavidyalay, is a general degree college in Bongaon, North 24 Parganas in the Indian state of West Bengal. It mainly offers undergraduate courses in arts, science and commerce. It is currently affiliated to West Bengal State University (formerly affiliated to University of Calcutta).

== History ==
It was established in 1947 when Bongaon High School served as its birthplace. The college is named after Dinabandhu Mitra, a Bengali dramatist, who is primarily known for his play Nil Darpan, which is about the plight of indigo farmers. This college was established for providing quality higher education to the largely middle and lower-middle class population of the town of Bongaon and its rural areas because that point of time there was no college in this locality. In 2022, the college observed its 75th anniversary.

== Departments and courses ==
The college offers different undergraduate and postgraduate courses and aims at imparting education to the undergraduates of lower- and middle-class people of Bongaon and its adjoining areas. Post-Graduate course in Bengali started from the session 2008-2009 under West Bengal State University. It also offers Post-Graduation courses under the Directorate of Open and Distance Learning of University of Kalyani in History, English, Bengali and Education from the 2009-2010 session.

=== Science ===
Science faculty consists of the departments of Chemistry, Physics, Mathematics, Computer Science & Application, Botany, Zoology, Anthropology, and Economics.

=== Arts & Commerce ===
Arts and Commerce faculty consists of departments of Bengali, English, Sanskrit, History, Geography, Political Science, Philosophy, Education, and Commerce.

== Accreditation ==
Dinabandhu Mahavidyalay is recognized by the University Grants Commission (UGC). It was accredited by the National Assessment and Accreditation Council (NAAC), and awarded B grade, an accreditation that has since then expired.

== Notable alumni ==
- Ashok Kirtania, Minister of Food and Supplies, Government of West Bengal.

== See also ==
- Education in India
- List of colleges in West Bengal
- Education in West Bengal
