= Acharya Prafulla Chandra College =

College in West Bengal, India

- আচার্য প্রফুল্লচন্দ্র কলেজ
- Former name: New Barrackpore College
- Motto: Service, Knowledge, Sacrifice
- Type: Public State and Central Government Sponsored
- Established: c. 16 August 1960; 66 years ago
- Founder: Late Haripada Biswas
- Accreditation: NAAC
- Academic affiliations: WBSU; UGC; MoE; RUSA; DST
- Endowment: ₹14.877 crore (US$1.5 million) (FY2022–23 est.)
- President: Nikhil Chandra Halder
- Principal: Syed Rafi Ahmed
- Academic staff: 119 (2024)
- Administrative staff: 33
- Students: 4,181 (2024)
- Undergraduates: 3,912 (2024)
- Postgraduates: 269 (2024)
- Location: Baghajati Road, New Barrackpore, North 24 Parganas, West Bengal, 700131, India; 22.6975243°N 88.4378712°E
- Campus: Urban, Large city 8.56 acres (3.46 ha)
- Language: English, Bengali
- Collection of Writings (Journal): Acharya Prafulla Chandra Roy Rachana Sankalan
- Colors: Blue, white, Atomic tangerine
- Website: www.apccollege.ac.in

Acharya Prafulla Chandra College (APC College), also known as New Barrackpore College, is a Government Higher Educational Institution (College) located in North 24 Paragana, West Bengal, India. It is one of the glorious educational institution founded on 16 August 1960, under the Dispersal Scheme with the joint participation of the State Government and Central Government name as "New Barrackpore College" has completed its 64 years of journey and achieved the status one of the best colleges in the district as well as the state West Bengal. It is affiliated with West Bengal State University. It offers co-educational 27 undergraduate and 8 postgraduate degree studies/courses for Science and Arts Subjects. The college is awarded and has been rated as Grade "A" by the Indian National Assessment and Accreditation Council (NAAC).

== History ==
In 1960, Acharya Prafulla Chandra College was founded under the joint participation of State and Central Government of India with the name of New Barrackpore College. The Founder secretary of this college at that time, Late Haripada Biswas. Later New Barrackpore College renamed as "Acharya Prafulla Chandra College", after Prafulla Chandra Ray, a Bengali chemist considered the father of Indian chemistry.

During India's partition, individuals from East Pakistan (now Bangladesh) moved to West Bengal in large numbers. New Barrackpore was one of the several refugee communities that emerged. Right after the necessity for food and shelter was addressed, as well as Demand for educational institutions increased. This led to the establishment of this college named as Acharya Prafulla Chandra College (Formerly New Barrackpore College). This resulted in the birth of this college with the initiative and endeavor of Late Haripada Biswas. The college had a quite humble Beginning with a handful of pupils starting their studies in a few rented rooms of New Barrackpore Colony Boys' High School. Although, today's Picture is one of the complete make over. Struggle still exists, but it is no longer a basic struggle for survival, but rather a continuous effort to achieve perfection.

Since its inception in 1960, the institution has grown steadily and has achieved the status of one of the best college in the district North 24 Paragana and as well as state.

== Mission ==
The college's semi-urban setting meets the demands of students from the grassroots level, some of whom are first-generation learners. The college is working hard to establish a pedagogical aim that is less hectoring and didactic and more learner-centered.

The college aims to balance tradition with experimentation. It has a stated goal of providing value-based quality education with a market-driven research orientation in order to produce a technologically skilled and ethically aware global workforce. The college also aims to instill in students a concern for the environment so that they will use cleaner and greener technologies in their professional lives.

With the implementation of NEP 2020, the emphasis will be on holistic growth without rigid topic boundaries in Acharya Prafulla Chandra College.

== Location ==
The college is situated on the Sodepur Road. The close proximity of the college to New Barrackpore and Madhyamgram railway stations has helped it draw students from far-flung areas of North 24 Parganas. Bus routes also conveniently connect the college with both Jessore Road and B. T. Road.

== RUSA-2.0 project ==
Rashtriya Uchchatar Shiksha Abhiyan (RUSA) is a Centrally Sponsored Scheme (CSS), launched in 2013 aims at providing strategic funding to eligible state higher educational institutions. Acharya Prafulla Chandra College received approval for a grant of Rs. 2 crore under RUSA-2.0 Project in 2018.

== Departments ==
The college has the following departments, offering Under graduate degree[Honours(Major) and General(Multidisciplinary Course)]:

Departments of Science, Acharya Prafulla Chandra College (UG)
- Anthropology
- Botany
- Chemistry
- Computer Science
- Electronics
- Economics
- Food and Nutrition
- Industrial Fish and Fisheries (IFF)
- Geography
- Mathematics
- Microbiology
- Molecular Biology & Biotechnology
- Physics
- Statistics
- Zoology

Departments of Arts, Acharya Prafulla Chandra College (UG)
- Advertising management (ASP/ASPV)
- Bengali
- Economics
- Education
- English
- Geography
- History
- Human Development
- Journalism and Mass Communication
- Philosophy
- Physical Education
- Political Science
- Sanskrit

The college also offers Post-graduate degree in following departments :

Departments of Science, Acharya Prafulla Chandra College (PG)
- Chemistry
- Computer Science
- Electronic Science
- Mathematics
- Microbiology
- Physics

Departments of Arts, Acharya Prafulla Chandra College (PG)
- Bengali
- History

== Accreditation ==
The college is recognised by NAAC and UGC.

== Notable alumni ==
- Sayantan Ghosal, Indian screenplay writer and filmmaker
- Rubel Das, actor

== See also ==
- Education in India
- List of colleges in West Bengal
- Education in West Bengal
