= Bidhannagar College =

College in Kolkata, West Bengal

Bidhannagar Government College
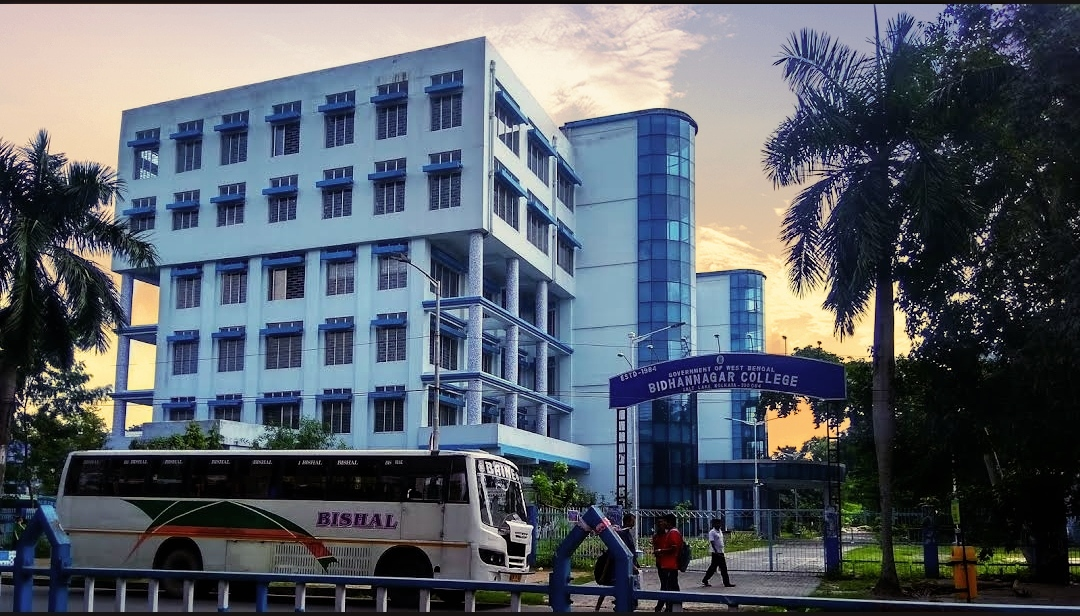
- New Building of Bidhannagar Government College
- Type: Government
- Established: 25 June 1984
- Director: Government of West Bengal
- Location: EB-2, Sector-I, Salt Lake, Kolkata, West Bengal, India; 22°35′04.88″N 88°24′10.73″E
- Campus: Urban
- Website: www.bnc.ac.in//
- Location within West Bengal Location within India

Bidhannagar Government College in Salt Lake, Kolkata, established on 25 June 1984, is a West Bengal State University affiliated college run by the Government of West Bengal. It was formerly affiliated to the University of Calcutta. Apart from undergraduate courses, the college offers postgraduate courses in Anthropology, Botany, Chemistry, Education, Microbiology and Zoology.

== History ==
Bidhannagar Government College started on 25 June 1984 in a small building at BF-142, Salt Lake, Kolkata 700064 with a student strength of 52. The founder principal was Dr. Subes Chandra Sarkar. Undergraduate courses in Mathematics and Economics began from the day of opening, while the physics and chemistry departments became functional from the academic session of 1985–86. Honours subjects offered in the Humanities were English, Bengali, history, political science and philosophy. Honours courses in Anthropology, Botany and Microbiology opened during the 2002–2003 session. M.Sc. courses in zoology and microbiology started in 2004. In 2009 Department of Education started their journey.

With the gradual increase in the number of departments and the corresponding student strength, the original building became inadequate. A new, larger mega size urban hi-tech building at EB 2, Salt Lake, Kolkata 700064 was constructed and after construction total area became 25.6 acres (104,000 m^{2}).

== Main building ==
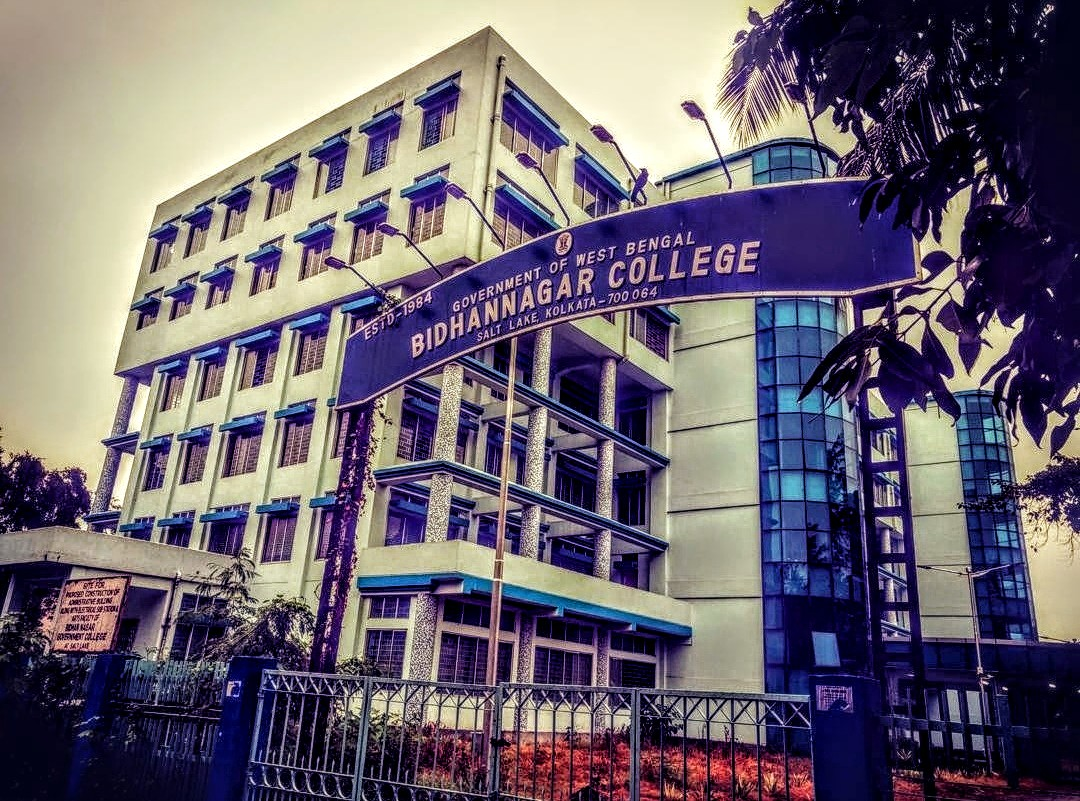
New Building Bidhannagar Government College

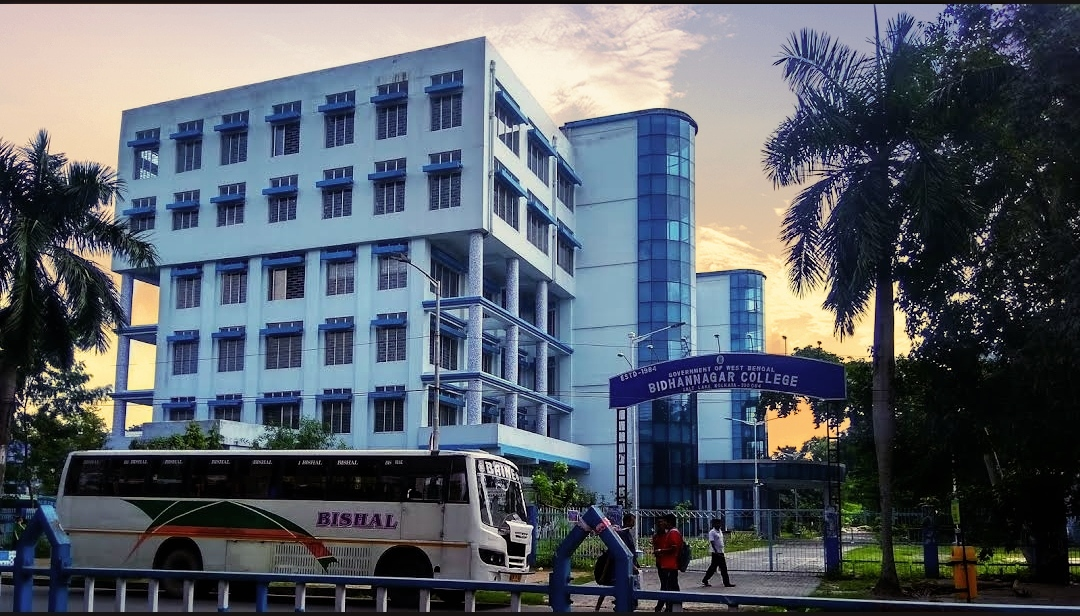
New Building of Bidhannagar Government College

The present hi-tech mega size building, located on prime real estate, is a three-storey structure with front gardens and a playground for students. A new annex is currently under construction, to which the Humanities and Social Science departments and the Library shall be moved.

== Courses ==
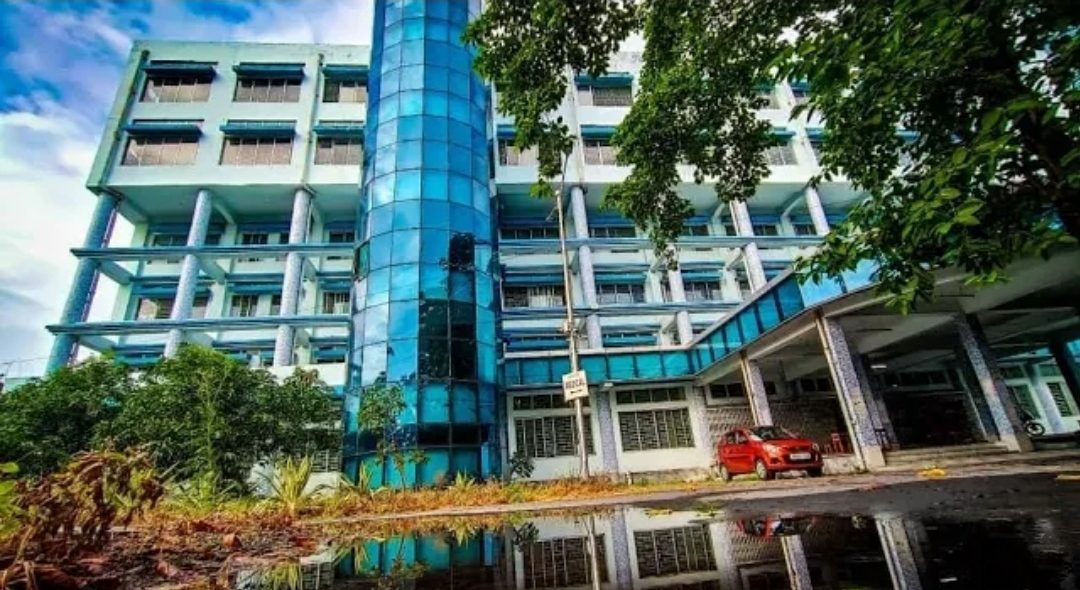
Main Campus

=== Undergraduate courses ===
- Education
- English
- Bengali
- Political Science
- History
- Philosophy
- Economics
- Physics
- Chemistry
- Mathematics
- Zoology
- Statistics
- Botany
- Microbiology
- Geography
- Anthropology

=== Postgraduate courses ===
- Botany
- Anthropology
- Education
- Microbiology
- Zoology
- Chemistry

== Department of Education ==
=== Overview ===
The Department of Education in Bidhannagar Government College was established in 2008. The Department offers undergraduate honours course on the basis of annual based credit system. The department provides the infrastructural facilities such as departmental library, common seminar library room, three computers with printer and one common classroom with ICT facilities. The number of sanctioned teaching posts is six in number. At present there are five permanent faculty members and one part-time teacher.

=== Course offered ===
- B.A (Hons) in Education - 3 years
- M.A in Education (Regular) - 2 years

== Notable alumni ==
- Chandril Bhattacharya
- Solanki Roy

== See also ==
- Education in India
- List of colleges in West Bengal
- Education in West Bengal
