= Prasanta Chandra Mahalanobis Mahavidyalaya =

Undergraduate college in Baranagar, India

- Type: Undergraduate college
- Established: 1965; 61 years ago
- Affiliations: West Bengal State University
- Principal: Dr. Arnab Ghosh
- Location: 111, 3, Barrackpore Trunk Road, Baranagar, Kolkata, West Bengal, 700108, India; 22.6476766°N 88.3810711°E
- Campus: Urban
- Website: pcmm.edu.in
- Location within West Bengal Location within India

Prasanta Chandra Mahalanobis Mahavidyalaya (formerly Bon Hooghly College of Commerce), established in 1965, is a general degree college in Baranagar, Kolkata. It offers undergraduate courses in arts, commerce and sciences. It is affiliated to West Bengal State University. The National Assessment and Accreditation Council (NAAC) visited the college in 2024 and accredited it with 'B+' grade.

== Accreditation ==
The National Assessment and Accreditation Council (NAAC) visited the college in 2008 and accredited it with 'B' grade. The National Assessment and Accreditation Council (NAAC) visited the college in 2019 and accredited it with 'C' grade. The National Assessment and Accreditation Council (NAAC) visited the college in 2024 and accredited it with 'B+' grade.

== History ==
Prasanta Chandra Mahalanobis Mahavidyalaya (Formerly Bon Hooghly College of Commerce) was established in 1965 as a private evening Commerce College affiliated to the University of Calcutta.

== Academic departments ==
=== Science ===
- Physics
- Chemistry
- Mathematics
- Computer Science
- Food and Nutrition

=== Arts ===
- Bengali
- English
- History
- Philosophy
- Education
- Political Science
- Geography
- Sociology
- Economics

=== Commerce ===
- Accountancy

== National Service Scheme ==
National Service Scheme unit of Prasanta Chandra Mahalanobis Mahavidyalaya has successfully collaborated with 16 different NGOs and Government organizations to conduct .

== See also ==
- Education in India
- List of colleges in West Bengal
- Education in West Bengal
