= Barasat College =

College in Barsat, Kolkata, West Bengal, India

- Former name: Barasat Evening College
- Type: Undergraduate college
- Established: 1972; 54 years ago
- Academic affiliations: West Bengal State University
- Principal: Dr. Partha Pratim Dasgupta
- Location: Kalyani Road, Barasat, West Bengal, 700126, India; 22°42′58.62″N 88°28′22.47″E
- Campus: Urban
- Language: Bengali
- Website: https://www.barasatcollege.ac.in/

- Location within West Bengal Location within India

Barasat College, previously named as Barasat Evening College (Bengali: বারাসাত সান্ধ্য কলেজ), was established in 1972, is the general degree college in Barasat, Kolkata. It offers undergraduate courses in arts, commerce and sciences. It is affiliated to West Bengal State University.

== Departments ==
=== Science ===
- Chemistry
- Geography
- Physics
- Mathematics
- Botany
- Zoology
- Computer Science

=== Arts ===
- Bengali
- English
- History
- Political Science
- Philosophy
- Economics
- Education
- Sociology
- Commerce

=== Commerce ===
- Accountancy
- Marketing

== Accreditation ==
Barasat College is recognized by the University Grants Commission (UGC). The college has been accredited B grade by NAAC.

== Controversy ==
The college has been often in the news for various chaos that occurred in the college.

== See also ==
- Education in India
- List of colleges in West Bengal
- Education in West Bengal
