= Ghuni =

- Census Town
- Location in West Bengal, India Ghuni (India)
- Coordinates: 22.599647°N 88.458344°E
- Country: India
- State: West Bengal
- District: North 24 Parganas

Area
  - Total: 3.8918 km^{2} (1.5026 sq mi)

Population (2011)
  - Total: 24,249
  - Density: 6,230.8/km^{2} (16,138/sq mi)

Languages
  - Official: Bengali, English
- Time zone: UTC+5:30 (IST)
- PIN: 700135
- Telephone code: 03174
- Vehicle registration: WB-23, WB-24, WB-25, WB-26
- Lok Sabha constituency: Barasat
- Vidhan Sabha constituency: Rajarhat New Town

Ghuni is a census town in the Rajarhat CD block in the Bidhannagar subdivision of the North 24 Parganas district in the state of West Bengal, India.

== Geography ==
Cities, towns and locations in Bidhannagar subdivision, North 24 Parganas
M: municipal town, CT: census town, R: rural/ urban centre, F: facilities
Abbreviation: UEM - University of Engineering & Management
Owing to space constraints in the small map, the actual locations in a larger map may vary slightly

=== Location ===
Ghuni is located at 22.599647°N 88.458344°E.

== Demographics ==
According to the 2011 Census of India, Ghuni had a total population of 24,249, of which 12,618 (52%) were males and 11,631 (48%) were females. Population in the age range 0-6 years was 3,017. The total number of literate persons in Ghuni was 17,165 (80.84% of the population over 6 years).

== Infrastructure ==
According to the District Census Handbook, North Twenty Four Parganas, 2011, Ghuni covered an area of 3.8918 km^{2}. It had 6 km roads, with open drains. The protected water-supply involved overhead tank, tube well/ bore well, hand pump. It had 4,500 domestic electric connections, 40 road light points. Among the medical facilities it had 3 medicine shops. Among the educational facilities, it had 7 primary schools, middle, secondary, senior secondary schools at Hatiara 4 km away. The nearest college was 14 km away at Kolkata. It had the branch office of 1 agricultural credit society.

== Healthcare ==
Rekjoani Rural Hospital at Rekjuani with 30 beds functions as the main medical facility in Rajarhat CD block.
