= Raigachhi =

Raigachi
- Census Town
- Location in West Bengal, India Raigachi (India)
- Coordinates: 22.63722°N 88.473232°E
- Country: India
- State: West Bengal
- District: North 24 Parganas

Area
  - Total: 1.52 km^{2} (0.59 sq mi)

Population (2011)
  - Total: 8,245
  - Density: 5,420/km^{2} (14,000/sq mi)

Languages
  - Official: Bengali, English
- Time zone: UTC+5:30 (IST)
- PIN: 700135
- Telephone code: +91 33
- ISO 3166 code: IN-WB
- Vehicle registration: WB
- Lok Sabha constituency: Barasat
- Vidhan Sabha constituency: Rajarhat New Town
- Website: north24parganas.nic.in

Raigachi is a census town in the Rajarhat CD block in the Barasat Sadar subdivision in North 24 Parganas district in the Indian state of West Bengal.

== Geography ==
Cities, towns and locations in Bidhannagar subdivision, North 24 Parganas
M: municipal town, CT: census town, R: rural/ urban centre, F: facilities
Abbreviation: UEM - University of Engineering & Management
Owing to space constraints in the small map, the actual locations in a larger map may vary slightly

=== Location ===
Raigachi is close to Action Area II C and II D of New Town. Deara is located nearby.

=== Area overview ===
Rajarhat, a rural area earlier, adjacent to Kolkata, is being transformed into an upmarket satellite township, with modern business hubs, luxury real estate and eye-catching shopping malls. With enormous construction activity taking place all around, things are changing fast, leaving behind a description at any given point of time as outdated in no time. Bidhannagar subdivision consists of Bidhannagar Municipality, Mahishbathan II Gram Panchayat and Rajarhat-Gopalpur Municipality (subsequently merged to form Bidhannagar Municipal Corporation since 2015), including Nabadiganta Industrial Township (Bidhannagar Sector - V) and Rajarhat (Community development block).

Note: The map alongside presents some of the notable locations in the subdivision. All places marked in the map are linked in the larger full screen map.

== Demographics ==
=== Population ===
According to the 2011 Census of India, Raigachi had a total population of 8,245, of which 4,196 (51%) were males and 4,049 (49%) were females. Population in the age range 0–6 years was 1,045. The total number of literate persons in Raigachi was 5,604 (77.83% of the population over 6 years).

As of 2001 India census, Raigachi had a population of 6728. Males constitute 51% of the population and females 49%. Raigachi has an average literacy rate of 55%, lower than the national average of 59.5%: male literacy is 58% and female literacy is 52%. In Raigachhi, 16% of the population is under 6 years of age.

=== Kolkata Urban Agglomeration ===
The following Municipalities and Census Town in Barasat Sadar subdivision were part of Kolkata Urban Agglomeration, according to the 2011 census: Barasat (M), Madhyamgram (M), Rajarhat-Gopalpur (M) (made part of Bidhannagar Municipal Corporation in 2015) and Raigachi (CT).

== Infrastructure ==
As per District Census Handbook 2011, Raigachi covered an area of 1.57 km^{2}. It had 6 primary schools, 3 middle schools and 3 secondary schools. The nearest degree college was 3 km away at Krishnapur. The nearest hospital with 20 beds was 1 km away.

== Transport ==
SRCM Road and Rajarhat Main Road (part of State Highway 3) pass along the north and south boundaries of Raigachhi.

=== Bus ===
==== Private Bus ====
- 91 Shyambazar - Bhangar Kanthalia (via SRCM Road)
- 91A Shyambazar - Haroa (via SRCM Road)
- 91C Shyambazar - Lauhati (via SRCM Road)
- 211 Ahiritola - Kharibari/Patharghata (via Rajarhat Main Road)
- 211A Ahiritola - Langalpota (via Rajarhat Main Road)

==== Bus Routes Without Numbers ====
- Nabanna - Rajarhat Chowmatha (via Rajarhat Main Road)
- Shyambazar - Polerhat (via Rajarhat Main Road)

== Healthcare ==
North 24 Parganas district has been identified as one of the areas where ground water is affected by arsenic contamination.

== See also ==
Map Rajarhat CD Block on Page 605 of District Census Handbook.
