= Chandpur Champagachhi =

- Census Town
- Location in West Bengal, India Chandpur Champagachhi (India)
- Coordinates: 22.611267°N 88.538344°E
- Country: India
- State: West Bengal
- District: North 24 Parganas

Area
  - Total: 2.1409 km^{2} (0.8266 sq mi)

Population (2011)
  - Total: 6,431
  - Density: 3,004/km^{2} (7,780/sq mi)

Languages
  - Official: Bengali, English
- Time zone: UTC+5:30 (IST)
- PIN: 700135
- Telephone code: 03174
- Vehicle registration: WB-23, WB-24, WB-25, WB-26
- Lok Sabha constituency: Barasat
- Vidhan Sabha constituency: Rajarhat New Town

Chandpur Champagachhi (also written as Chandapur Champagachhi) is a census town in the Rajarhat CD block in the Bidhannagar subdivision of the North 24 Parganas district in the state of West Bengal, India.

== Geography ==
Cities, towns and locations in Bidhannagar subdivision, North 24 Parganas
M: municipal town, CT: census town, R: rural/ urban centre, F: facilities
Abbreviation: UEM - University of Engineering & Management
Owing to space constraints in the small map, the actual locations in a larger map may vary slightly

=== Location ===
Chandapur Champagachhi is located at 22.611267°N 88.538344°E.

=== Area overview ===
Rajarhat, a rural area earlier, adjacent to Kolkata, is being transformed into an upmarket satellite township, with modern business hubs, luxury real estate and eye-catching shopping malls. With enormous construction activity taking place all around, things are changing fast, leaving behind a description at any given point of time as outdated in no time. Bidhannagar subdivision consists of Bidhannagar Municipality, Mahishbathan II Gram Panchayat and Rajarhat-Gopalpur Municipality (subsequently merged to form Bidhannagar Municipal Corporation since 2015), including Nabadiganta Industrial Township (Bidhannagar Sector - V) and Rajarhat (Community development block).

Note: The map alongside presents some of the notable locations in the subdivision. All places marked in the map are linked in the larger full screen map.

== Demographics ==
According to the 2011 Census of India, Chandapur Champagachhi had a total population of 6,431, of which 3,260 (51%) were males and 3,171 (49%) were females. Population in the age range 0–6 years was 844. The total number of literate persons in Chandapur Champagachhi was 4,494 (80.44% of the population over 6 years).

== Infrastructure ==
According to the District Census Handbook, North Twenty Four Parganas, 2011, Chandapur Champagachhi covered an area of 2.1409 km^{2}. It had 5 km roads, with open drains. The protected water-supply involved tap water from treated sources, hand pumps. It had 1,000 domestic electric connections, 70 road light points. Among the medical facilities it had 3 medicine shops. Among the educational facilities, it had 2 primary schools, 2 middle schools, 1 secondary school, 1 senior secondary school. The nearest college was 12 km away at Bidhannagar.

== Healthcare ==
Rekjoani Rural Hospital at Rekjuani with 30 beds functions as the main medical facility in Rajarhat CD block.
