= Bhatenda =

- Census Town
- Location in West Bengal, India Bhatenda (India)
- Coordinates: 22.632167°N 88.489344°E22.632167,88.489344
- Country: India
- State: West Bengal
- District: North 24 Parganas

Area
  - Total: 1.1086 km^{2} (0.4280 sq mi)

Population (2011)
  - Total: 6,349
  - Density: 5,727/km^{2} (14,830/sq mi)

Languages
  - Official: Bengali, English
- Time zone: UTC+5:30 (IST)
- PIN: 700135
- Telephone code: 03174
- Vehicle registration: WB-23, WB-24, WB-25, WB-26
- Lok Sabha constituency: Barasat
- Vidhan Sabha constituency: Rajarhat New Town

Bhatenda is a census town in the Rajarhat CD block in the Bidhannagar subdivision of the North 24 Parganas district in the state of West Bengal, India.

== Geography ==
Cities, towns and locations in Bidhannagar subdivision, North 24 Parganas
M: municipal town, CT: census town, R: rural/ urban centre, F: facilities
Abbreviation: UEM - University of Engineering & Management
Owing to space constraints in the small map, the actual locations in a larger map may vary slightly

=== Location ===
Bhatenda is located at 22.632167°N 88.489344°E.

=== Area overview ===
Rajarhat, a rural area earlier, adjacent to Kolkata, is being transformed into an upmarket satellite township, with modern business hubs, luxury real estate and eye-catching shopping malls. With enormous construction activity taking place all around, things are changing fast, leaving behind a description at any given point of time as outdated in no time. Bidhannagar subdivision consists of Bidhannagar Municipality, Mahishbathan II Gram Panchayat and Rajarhat-Gopalpur Municipality (subsequently merged to form Bidhannagar Municipal Corporation since 2015), including Nabadiganta Industrial Township (Bidhannagar Sector - V) and Rajarhat (Community development block).

Note: The map alongside presents some of the notable locations in the subdivision. All places marked in the map are linked in the larger full screen map.

== Demographics ==
According to the 2011 Census of India, Bhatenda had a total population of 6,349, of which 3,231 (51%) were males and 3,116 (49%) were females. Population in the age range 0–6 years was 542. The total number of literate persons in Bhatenda was 5,419 (93.32% of the population over 6 years).

== Infrastructure ==
According to the District Census Handbook, North Twenty Four Parganas, 2011, Bhatenda covered an area of 1.1086 km^{2}. The protected water-supply involved tap water from treated sources, tank, pond, lake. It had 639 domestic electric connections. Among the educational facilities, it had 4 primary schools, 3 middle schools, 3 secondary schools, 3 senior secondary schools. The nearest college was 5 km away at Gopalpur. It had 3 recognised shorthand, typewriting and vocational training institutions. Among the social, cultural and recreational facilities, it had 1 cinema theatre, 1 auditorium/community hall, 1 public library. It had branch offices of 1 nationalised bank and 1 cooperative bank.

== Healthcare ==
Rekjoani Rural Hospital at Rekjuani with 30 beds functions as the main medical facility in Rajarhat CD block.
