= Basina, North 24 Parganas =

Basina
- Census Town
- Location in West Bengal, India Basina (India)
- Coordinates: 22.613467°N 88.494344°E
- Country: India
- State: West Bengal
- District: North 24 Parganas

Area
  - Total: 1.3206 km^{2} (0.5099 sq mi)

Population (2011)
  - Total: 5,413
  - Density: 4,099/km^{2} (10,620/sq mi)

Languages
  - Official: Bengali, English
- Time zone: UTC+5:30 (IST)
- PIN: 700135
- Telephone code: 03174
- Vehicle registration: WB-23, WB-24, WB-25, WB-26
- Lok Sabha constituency: Barasat
- Vidhan Sabha constituency: Rajarhat New Town

Basina is a census town in the Rajarhat CD block in the Bidhannagar subdivision of the North 24 Parganas district in the state of West Bengal, India.

== Geography ==
Cities, towns and locations in Bidhannagar subdivision, North 24 Parganas
M: municipal town, CT: census town, R: rural/ urban centre, F: facilities
Abbreviation: UEM - University of Engineering & Management
Owing to space constraints in the small map, the actual locations in a larger map may vary slightly

=== Location ===
Basina is located at 22.613467°N 88.494344°E.

=== Area overview ===
Rajarhat, a rural area earlier, adjacent to Kolkata, is being transformed into an upmarket satellite township, with modern business hubs, luxury real estate and eye-catching shopping malls. With enormous construction activity taking place all around, things are changing fast, leaving behind a description at any given point of time as outdated in no time. Bidhannagar subdivision consists of Bidhannagar Municipality, Mahishbathan II Gram Panchayat and Rajarhat-Gopalpur Municipality (subsequently merged to form Bidhannagar Municipal Corporation since 2015), including Nabadiganta Industrial Township (Bidhannagar Sector - V) and Rajarhat (Community development block).

Note: The map alongside presents some of the notable locations in the subdivision. All places marked in the map are linked in the larger full screen map.

== Demographics ==
According to the 2011 Census of India, Basina had a total population of 5,413, of which 2,772 (51%) were males and 2,641 (49%) were females. Population in the age range 0–6 years was 685. The total number of literate persons in Basina was 3,907 (82.64% of the population over 6 years).

== Infrastructure ==
According to the District Census Handbook, North Twenty Four Parganas, 2011, Basina covered an area of 1.3206 km^{2}. It had 6 km roads, with open drains. The protected water-supply involved tap water from untreated sources, hand pumps. It had 476 domestic electric connections. Among the medical facilities it had 9 medicine shops. Among the educational facilities, it had 1 primary school, secondary and senior secondary schools at Bidhannagar 4 km away. The nearest college was 10 km away at New Town. It is well known for polythene pipes. It had branch offices of 1 private commercial bank.

== Healthcare ==
Rekjoani Rural Hospital at Rekjuani with 30 beds functions as the main medical facility in Rajarhat CD block.
