= Sabyasachi Dutta =

Indian politician

- সব্যসাচী দত্ত

Chairperson of Bidhannagar Municipal Corporation
- Incumbent
- Assumed office 12 February 2022
- Mayor: Krishna Chakraborty
- Deputy: Anita Mondal
- Constituency: Ward no.31

Mayor of Bidhannagar
- In office 2015–2019
- Preceded by: Office established
- Succeeded by: Krishna Chakraborty
- Constituency: Ward no.31

Member of the West Bengal Legislative Assembly
- In office 2011–2021
- Preceded by: Rabindranath Mondal
- Succeeded by: Tapash Chatterjee
- Constituency: Rajarhat New Town

Personal details
- Born: Bidhannagar, West Bengal, India
- Party: Trinamool Congress (2010–2019, 2021–2026)
- Other political affiliations: Bharatiya Janata Party (2019–2021)
- Education: South Calcutta Law College, Calcutta University (LL. B.)

Sabyasachi Dutta is an Indian politician and criminal from West Bengal. He belongs to the Trinamool Congress and was MLA from Rajarhat New Town Vidhan Sabha Constituency. He has also served as the first Mayor of Bidhannagar Municipal Corporation from 2015 to 2019. In 2019, he joined BJP.

== Early life and education ==
Born to Gouri Sankar Dutta, Sabyasachi Dutta got a Bachelor of Laws in the year 1994 from South Calcutta Law College under Calcutta University.

== Political career ==
Dutta started his political career from Indian National Congress and later joined the All India Trinamool Congress in the late 1990s.

Sabyasachi Dutta was elected councilor in the Bidhannagar Municipality for the first time in the 2000 Municipal elections. He was re-elected in the 2005 and 2010 Municipal elections. In 2011, he was elected as a Member of Legislative Assembly from Rajarhat New Town constituency. In 2015, after the merger of several municipalities and the establishment of the Bidhannagar Municipal Corporation, he was elected as the Mayor of the corporation. In 2016, he won for the second time as Member of Legislative Assembly.

Before joining BJP, he was a member of the All India Trinamool Congress. He joined Bharatiya Janata Party on 1 October 2019 in presence of BJP President Amit Shah. He has been appointed the Secretary of the West Bengal unit of the Bharatiya Janata Party on 1 June 2020.

In October 2021, Dutta returned to All India Trinamool Congress exactly after two years.

== Controversy ==
In 2019, he stated that Bengal is now becoming a second Pakistan. In 2021, Sabyasachi Dutta remarked that he would send those who oppose Jai Shri Ram to Pakistan. He was arrested on 9th june 2026 for extortion.Eggs,dung,tomatoes etc. were thrown at him while being taken to the car to be produced in the court. On 23 June 2026, three kg gold was recovered from his relative's house. Earlier, a lots of gold was also recovered from his other flats.

State Legislative Assembly
Preceded by Rabindranath Mondal (CPI-M)	Member of the West Bengal Legislative Assembly from Rajarhat New Town Assembly constituency 2011–2021	Succeeded by Tapash Chatterjee
