= Basina =

Basina may refer to:

== People ==
- Basina Kloos (born 1940), German religious sister
- Basina of Neustria, daughter of Chilperic I, nun who led a revolt in Poitiers
- Basina, Queen of Thuringia
- Slavic feminine form of the surname Basin

== Places ==
- Basina, North 24 Parganas, a census town in West Bengal, India
- Basina, Belarus, village
