= Lauhati =

- Village
- Location in West Bengal, India Lauhati (India)
- Coordinates: 22°36′36″N 88°30′55″E
- Country: India
- State: West Bengal
- District: North 24 Parganas
- CD block: Rajarhat

Languages
  - Official: Bengali
  - Additional official: English
- Time zone: UTC+5:30 (IST)
- PIN: 700135
- Telephone code: 03174
- Lok Sabha constituency: Barasat
- Vidhan Sabha constituency: Rajarhat Newtown
- Website: north24parganas.gov.in

Lauhati is a village in the Rajarhat CD block in the Bidhannagar subdivision in North 24 Parganas in the Indian state of West Bengal.

== Geography ==
Cities, towns and locations in Bidhannagar subdivision, North 24 Parganas
M: municipal town, CT: census town, R: rural/ urban centre, F: facilities
Abbreviation: UEM - University of Engineering & Management
Owing to space constraints in the small map, the actual locations in a larger map may vary slightly

The nearest villages are Kamduni, Langalpota, Haroa, Patharghata, and Kharibari.

== Transportation ==
Bus

Private Bus

- 91 Shyambazar - Bhangar Kanthalia (via SRCM Road)
- 91A Shyambazar - Haroa (via SRCM Road)
- 91B Shyambazar - Haroa (via SRCM Road)
- 91C Shyambazar - Lauhati (via SRCM Road)
- 211B Shikarpur - Ahiritola (via Rajarhat Main Road)
