= Piyush Kanodia =

Indian politician (1983)

Member of the West Bengal Legislative Assembly
- Incumbent
- Assumed office 4 May 2026
- Preceded by: Tapash Chatterjee
- Constituency: Rajarhat NewTown

Personal details
- Party: Bharatiya Janata Party

Piyush Kanodia (born 1983) is an Indian politician from West Bengal. He is a member of the West Bengal Legislative Assembly from the Rajarhat New Town Assembly constituency in North 24 Parganas district representing the Bharatiya Janata Party.

== Early life and education ==
Kanodia is from Rajarhat Gopalpur, North 24 Parganas district, West Bengal. He is the son of Aditya Kumar Kanodia. He studied at Calcutta Public School and passed Class 10 in 2000. He and his wife run the family business. He declared assets worth Rs.7 crore in his affidavit to the Election Commission of India.

== Career ==
Kanodia won the Rajarhat New Town Assembly constituency representing the Bharatiya Janata Party in the 2026 West Bengal Legislative Assembly election. He polled 1,06,564 votes and defeated his nearest rival and sitting MLA, Tapash Chatterjee of the All India Trinamool Congress by a margin of 316 votes. A recount was done on 5 May 2026 and Kanodia was declared elected by a margin of 316 votes.
