= Barasat II =

- Community development block
- Interactive map of Barasat II
- Coordinates: 22.6487300°N 88.4908300°E
- Country: India
- State: West Bengal
- District: North 24 Parganas

Government
  - Type: Representative democracy

Area
  - Total: 114.04 km^{2} (44.03 sq mi)
- Elevation: 13 m (43 ft)

Population (2011)
  - Total: 200,918
  - Density: 1,761.8/km^{2} (4,563.1/sq mi)

Languages
  - Official: Bengali, English

Literacy (2011)
  - Total literates: 135,695 (77.71%)
- Time zone: UTC+5:30 (IST)
- Telephone/STD code: 033
- ISO 3166 code: IN-WB
- Vehicle registration: WB-23, WB-24, WB-25, WB-26
- Lok Sabha constituency: Barasat, Basirhat
- Vidhan Sabha constituency: Madhyamgram, Haroa
- Website: north24parganas.nic.in

Barasat II is a community development block that forms an administrative division in Barasat Sadar subdivision of North 24 Parganas district in the Indian state of West Bengal.

== Geography ==
Rohanda, a constituent panchayat of Barasat II block, is located at 22.661732°N 88.485628°E.

Barasat II CD Block is bounded by Barasat I CD Block in the north, Deganga and Haroa CD Blocks in the west and Rajarhat CD Block in the south. The Barrackpore industrial area with such municipalities as Madhyamgram, Dum Dum and Rajarhat-Gopalpur (now merged with Bidhannagar Municipal Corporation) is in the west and Barasat municipality is in the north.

Barasat II CD Block is part of the North Hooghly Flat, one of the three physiographic regions in the district located in the lower Ganges Delta. It is a raised alluvium area along the Hooghly, which forms the western boundary of the district. The Bidyadhari forms the eastern boundary of Barasat II CD Block with Deganga CD Block, and as such it is partly in the North Bidyadhari Plain.

Barasat II CD Block has an area of 114.04 km^{2}. It has 1 panchayat samity, 7 gram panchayats, 109 gram sansads (village councils), 78 mouzas and 77 inhabited villages, as per the District Statistical Handbook: North 24 Parganas. Madhyamgram and Shasan police stations serve this block. Headquarters of this CD Block is at Krishnapur Madanpur.

Gram panchayats of Barasat II block/ panchayat samiti are: Chandigarh–Rohanda, Falti Beliaghata, Kemia Khamarpara, Kirtipur I, Dadpur, Kiritipur II and Shason.

== Demographics ==
=== Population ===
As per 2011 Census of India Barasat II CD Block had a total population of 200,918, of which 188,294 were rural and 11,994 were urban. There were 104,253 (52%) males and 96,665 (48%) females. Population below 6 years was 26,305. Scheduled Castes numbered 21,025 (10.47%) and Scheduled Tribes numbered 2,556 (1.27%).

As per 2001 census, Barasat II block has a total population of 168,828 out of which 87,997 were males and 80,831 were females.

There is only one census town in Barasat II CD Block (2011 census figure in brackets): Deara (11,994).

Large villages in Barasat II CD Block (2011 census figures in brackets): Gopalpur Chandigar (7,204), Jojra (4,052), Kayemba (4,687), Chaumuha (4,780), Matiagachha (8,223), Mahishgadi (6,468), Sasan (5,818) and Falti-Banpur (6,418).

North 24 Parganas district is densely populated, mainly because of the influx of refugees from East Bengal (later Bangladesh). With a density of population of 2,182 per km^{2} in 1971, it was 3rd in terms of density per km^{2} in West Bengal after Kolkata and Howrah, and 20th in India. According to the District Human Development Report: North 24 Parganas, “High density is also explained partly by the rapid growth of urbanization in the district. In 1991, the percentage of urban population in the district has been 51.23.”

Decadal Population Growth Rate (%)

The decadal growth of population in Barasat II CD Block in 2001-2011 was 18.82%. The decadal growth of population in Barasat II CD Block in 1991-2001 was -29.45%. Decadal growth of population in Barasat municipality in 1991-2001 was 125.52%.

The decadal growth rate of population in North 24 Parganas district was as follows: 47.9% in 1951–61, 34.5% in 1961–71, 31.4% in 1971–81, 31.7% in 1981–91, 22.7% in 1991-2001 and 12.0% in 2001-11. The decadal growth rate for West Bengal in 2001-11 was 13.93%. The decadal growth rate for West Bengal was 17.84% in 1991-2001, 24.73% in 1981-1991 and 23.17% in 1971-1981.

Only a small portion of the border with Bangladesh has been fenced and it is popularly referred to as a porous border. It is freely used by Bangladeshi infiltrators, terrorists, smugglers, criminals et al.

=== Literacy ===
As per the 2011 census, the total number of literates in Barasat II CD Block was 135,695 (77.71% of the population over 6 years) out of which males numbered 74,011 (81.50% of the male population over 6 years) and females numbered 61,684 (73.60% of the female population over 6 years). The gender disparity (the difference between female and male literacy rates) was 7.90%.

See also – List of West Bengal districts ranked by literacy rate

Literacy in CD blocks of
North 24 Parganas district
Barasat Sadar subdivision
Amdanga – 80.69%
Deganga – 79.65%
Barasat I – 81.50%
Barasat II – 77.71%
Habra I – 83.15%
Habra II – 81.05%
Rajarhat – 83.13%
Basirhat subdivision
Baduria – 78.75%
Basirhat I – 72.10%
Basirhat II – 78.30%
Haroa – 73.13%
Hasnabad – 71.47%
Hingalganj – 76.85%
Minakhan – 71.33%
Sandeshkhali I – 71.08%
Sandeshkhali II – 70.96%
Swarupnagar – 77.57%
Bangaon subdivision
Bagdah – 75.30%
Bangaon – 79.71%
Gaighata – 82.32%
Barrackpore subdivision
Barrackpore I – 85.91%
Barrackpore II – 84.53%
Source: 2011 Census: CD Block Wise
Primary Census Abstract Data

=== Language and religion ===
Religion in Barasat II CD block (2011)
Islam	73.81%
Hinduism	25.93%
Other or not stated	0.26%

In the 2011 census Muslims numbered 148,296 (73.81%) of the population in Barasat II CD Block. Hindus numbered 52,105 (25.93%) and others numbered 517 (0.26%).

In 1981 Hindus numbered 87,684 and formed 54.55% of the population and Muslims numbered 73,013 and formed 45.45% of the population in Barasat II CD Block. In 1991 Hindus numbered 289,932 and formed 59.25% of the population and Muslims numbered 198,458 and formed 40.56% of the population in Barasat I and Barasat II CD Blocks taken together. (In 1981 and 1991 census was conducted as per jurisdiction of the police station). In 2001, Muslims numbered 123,253 (72.89%) and Hindus 45,570 (26.95%).

Languages of Barasat II CD block (2011)
1. Bengali (96.7%)
2. Hindi (2.21%)
3. Others (1.05%)

At the time of the 2011 census, 96.74% of the population spoke Bengali and 2.21% Hindi as their first language.

== Rural Poverty ==
23.11% of households in Barasat II CD Block lived below poverty line in 2001, against an average of 29.28% in North 24 Parganas district.

== Economy ==
=== Livelihood ===
Livelihood
in Barasat II CD Block
1. Cultivators (13.7%)
2. Agricultural labourers (26.8%)
3. Household industries (3.96%)
4. Other Workers (55.5%)

In Barasat II CD Block in 2011, amongst the class of total workers, cultivators numbered 9,080 and formed 13.73% of the total workers, agricultural labourers numbered 17,727 and formed 26.80%, household industry workers numbered 2,618 and formed 3.96% and other workers numbered 35,714 and formed 55.51%. Total workers numbered 66,139 and formed 32.12% of the total population, and non-workers numbered 134,779 and formed 67.08% of the population.

In more than 30 percent of the villages in North 24 Parganas, agriculture or household industry is no longer the major source of livelihood for the main workers there. The CD Blocks in the district can be classified as belonging to three categories: border areas, Sundarbans area and other rural areas. The percentage of other workers in the other rural areas category is considerably higher than those in the border areas and Sundarbans area.

Note: In the census records a person is considered a cultivator, if the person is engaged in cultivation/ supervision of land owned by self/government/institution. When a person who works on another person's land for wages in cash or kind or share, is regarded as an agricultural labourer. Household industry is defined as an industry conducted by one or more members of the family within the household or village, and one that does not qualify for registration as a factory under the Factories Act. Other workers are persons engaged in some economic activity other than cultivators, agricultural labourers and household workers. It includes factory, mining, plantation, transport and office workers, those engaged in business and commerce, teachers, entertainment artistes and so on.

=== Infrastructure ===
There are 76 inhabited villages in Barasat II CD Block, as per the District Census Handbook: North 24 Parganas. 100% villages have power supply and drinking water supply. 11 villages (14.47%) have post offices. 73 villages (76.05%) have telephones (including landlines, public call offices and mobile phones). 39 villages (51.32%) have a pucca approach road and 44 villages (57.89%) have transport communication (includes bus service, rail facility and navigable waterways). 5 villages (6.58%) have agricultural credit societies and 7 villages (9.21 ) have banks.

=== Agriculture ===
The North 24 Parganas district Human Development Report opines that in spite of agricultural productivity in North 24 Parganas district being rather impressive 81.84% of rural population suffered from shortage of food. With a high urbanisation of 54.3% in 2001, the land use pattern in the district is changing quite fast and the area under cultivation is declining. However, agriculture is still the major source of livelihood in the rural areas of the district.

From 1977 on wards major land reforms took place in West Bengal. Land in excess of land ceiling was acquired and distributed amongst the peasants. Following land reforms land ownership pattern has undergone transformation. In 2010–11, persons engaged in agriculture in Barasat II CD Block could be classified as follows: bargadars 3,535 (9.80%), patta (document) holders 2,776 (7.69%), small farmers (possessing land between 1 and 2 hectares) 1,620 (4.49%), marginal farmers (possessing land up to 1 hectare) 15,095 (41.83%) and agricultural labourers 13,057 (36.19%).

Barasat II CD Block had 105 fertiliser depots, 23 seed stores and 55 fair price shops in 2010-11.

In 2010–11, Barasat II CD Block produced 9,429 tonnes of Aman paddy, the main winter crop from 4,262 hectares, 6,084 tonnes of Boro paddy (spring crop) from 2,167 hectares, 31 tonnes of Aus paddy (summer crop) from 14 hectares, 557 tonnes of wheat from 262 hectares, 43,205 tonnes of jute from 3,124 hectares and 4,836 tonnes of potatoes from 194 hectares. It also produced pulses and oilseeds.

In 2010–11, the total area irrigated in Barasat II CD Block was 241 hectares, all of which were irrigated by deep tube well.

=== Pisciculture ===
In 2010–11, the net area under effective pisciculture in Barasat II CD Block was 2,752.76 hectares. 15,874 persons were engaged in the profession. Approximate annual production was 82,582.8 quintals.

=== Banking ===
In 2010–11, Barasat II CD Block had offices of 6 commercial banks and 3 gramin banks.

== Transport ==
In 2010–11, Barasat II CD Block had 6 originating/ terminating bus routes. The nearest railway station is 11 km from CD Block headquarters.

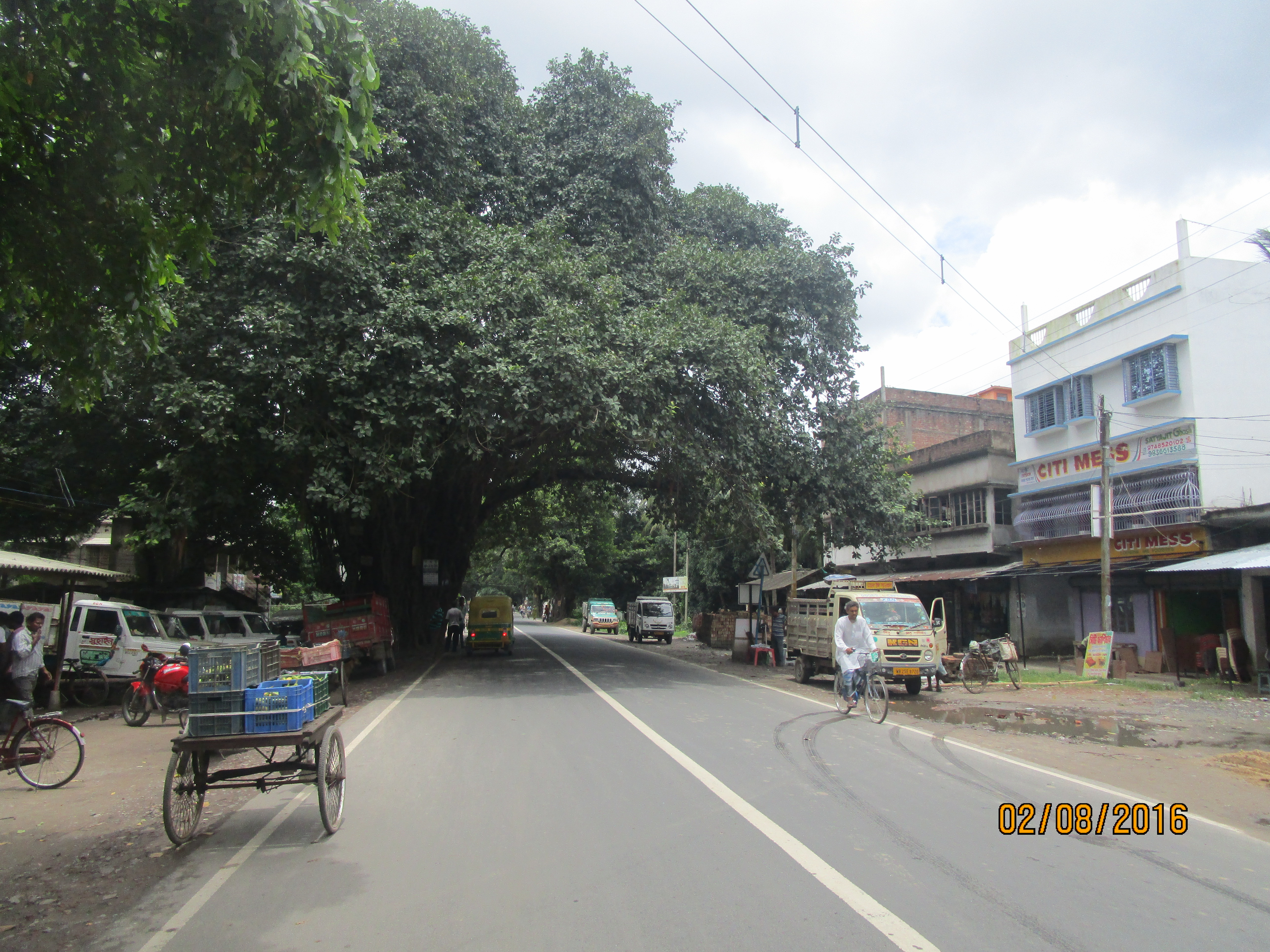
SH 2 at Kajibari, Uttarpara

SH 2 passes through this CD Block.

There are Karea Kadambagachhi railway station, Bahira Kalibari railway station, Sondalia railway station and Beliaghata Road railway station on the Barasat-Hasnabad line.

== Education ==
In 2010–11, Barasat II CD Block had 76 primary schools with 10,922 students, 2 middle schools with 189 students, 4 high schools with 4,578 students and 7 higher secondary schools with 13,465 students. Barasat II CD Block had 287 institutions for special and non-formal education with 12,901 students.

As per the 2011 census, in Barasat II CD Block, amongst the 76 inhabited villages, 2 villages did not have a school, 36 villages had more than 1 primary school, 29 villages had at least 1 primary and 1 middle school and 14 villages had at least 1 middle and 1 secondary school.

== Healthcare ==
In 2011, Barasat II CD Block had 1 rural hospital and 2 primary health centres, with total 42 beds and 7 doctors (excluding private bodies). It had 32 family welfare subcentres. 1,763 patients were treated indoors and 88,770 patients were treated outdoor in the hospitals, health centres and subcentres of the CD Block.

Madhyamgram Rural Hospital at Madhyamgram with 30 beds functions as the main medical facility in Barasat II CD Block. There are primary health centres at Shasan (Mitpukuria PHC with 10 beds) and Kiritipur (Bagband Siberia (Kemia Kamarpara) PHC with 6 beds).

Barasat II block is one of the areas where ground water is affected by arsenic contamination.
