= Kloos =

Kloos is a surname. Notable people with the surname include:

- Basina Kloos (born 1940), German nun
- Cornelis Kloos (1895-1976), Dutch painter
- Elimar Kloos (1908–1991), German boxer
- Justin Kloos (born 1993), American ice hockey player
- Marko Kloos, German author
- Rick Kloos, (born 1966), American politician
- Willem Kloos (1859–1938), Dutch poet and literary critic

== See also ==
- Kroos
