= Krishnapur Madanpur =

- Village
- Location in West Bengal, India Krishnapur Madanpur (India)
- Coordinates: 22.66973°N 88.521183°E
- Country: India
- State: West Bengal
- District: North 24 Parganas

Population (2011)
  - Total: 3,015

Languages
  - Official: Bengali, English
- Time zone: UTC+5:30 (IST)
- PIN: 700135
- Telephone/STD code: 033
- Lok Sabha constituency: Basirhat
- Vidhan Sabha constituency: Haroa
- Website: north24parganas.nic.in

Krishnapur Madanpur is a village in the Barasat II CD block in the Barasat Sadar subdivision of the North 24 Parganas district in the state of West Bengal, India.

== Geography ==
Cities, towns and locations in Barasat subdivision, North 24 Parganas
M: municipal town, CT: census town, R: rural/ urban centre, H: historical centre
Owing to space constraints in the small map, the actual locations in a larger map may vary slightly

=== Location ===
Krishna Madanpur is located at 22.66973°N 88.521183°E.

=== Area overview ===
The area covered in the map alongside is largely a part of the north Bidyadhari Plain. located in the lower Ganges Delta. The country is flat. It is a little raised above flood level and the highest ground borders the river channels. 54.67% of the people of the densely populated area lives in the urban areas and 45.33% lives in the rural areas.

Note: The map alongside presents some of the notable locations in the subdivision. All places marked in the map are linked in the larger full screen map.

== Civic administration ==
=== CD block HQ ===
The headquarters of Barasat II CD block are located at Krishnapur Madanpur.

== Demographics ==
According to the 2011 Census of India, Krishnapur Madanpur had a total population of 3,015, of which 1,570 (52%) were males and 1,445 (48%) were females. Population in the age range 0–6 years was 365. The total number of literate persons in Krishnapur Madanpur was 2,040 (76.98% of the population over 6 years).

== Transport ==
Badu Road links Krishnapur Madanpur to National Highway 12 (old numbering NH 34) at Madhyamgram and a link from Badu Road connects it to State Highway 2 (locally known as Taki Road).

== Healthcare ==
Bagband Siberia primary health centre is located nearby.

== See also ==
Map of Barasat II CD Block on Page 419 of District Census Handbook.
