= Madhyamgram =

City in West Bengal, India

- City
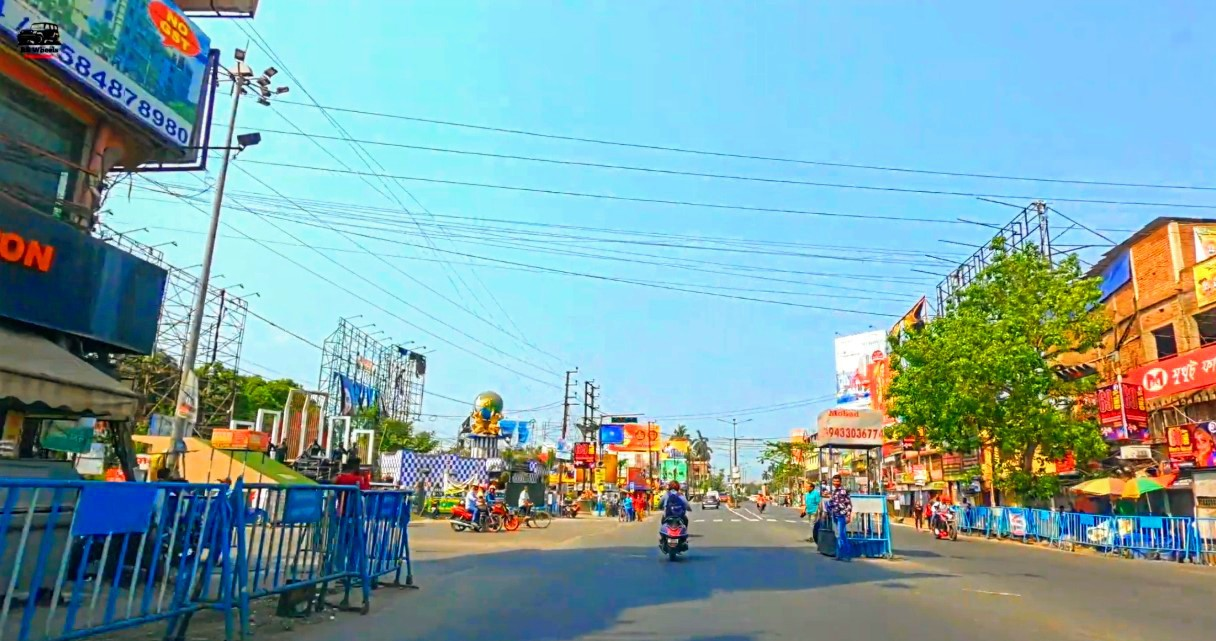
- Madhyamgram Chowmatha on Jessore Road

- Location in West Bengal, India Madhyamgram (India)
- Coordinates: 22.70°N 88.45°E
- Country: India
- State: West Bengal
- Division: Presidency
- District: North 24 Parganas

Government
  - Type: Municipality
  - Body: Madhyamgram Municipality
  - Chairman: Nemai Ghosh

Area
  - Total: 21.32 km^{2} (8.23 sq mi)
- Elevation: 15 m (49 ft)

Population (2020)
  - Total: 370,488
  - Density: 17,380/km^{2} (45,010/sq mi)

Languages
  - Official: Bengali
  - Additional official: English
- Time zone: UTC+5:30 (IST)
- PIN: 700127, 700128, 700129, 700130, 700133, 700155
- Telephone code: +91 33
- Vehicle registration: WB
- Lok Sabha constituency: Barasat
- Vidhan Sabha constituency: Madhyamgram
- Website: Madhyamgram Municipality

Madhyamgram is a city and a municipality of North 24 Parganas district in the Indian state of West Bengal. It is a part of the area covered by Kolkata Metropolitan Development Authority (KMDA).

== History ==
Madhyamgram was one of the twelve feudal provinces of Bengal. It was under Pratapaditya Roy, ruler of Jessore during the Mughal Empire.

On 21 December 1757, Mir Jafar, the Nawab of Bengal, presented twenty-four parganas to the East India Company as dowry which also included Madhyamgram, under Anwarpur Pargana, adjacent to Barasat.

The first railway line from Madhyamgram to Duttapukur was commissioned in 1882 and the station was called Chandipur. Madhyamgram was then named as Majher Gaon, probably because the area was situated between Badu (Chakradharpur Mouza) and Sajirhat (Guchuria Mouza).

The present narrow Noai Canal, now acting as a dividing border line between New Barrackpore and Madhyamgram, stretching from the south of Ganganagar to Sajirhat in the west, used to be a wide river, once called Labanyabati, which through colloquial transformation became the Noai River, and after years of silt depositions, turned into Noai Canal.

At that time, Anwarpur Pargana was notable for its tobacco trade and a special sweet-smelling blended tobacco was manufactured in Madhyamgram.

Madhyamgram was also a big paddy growing area, and the Labanya River was a medium of navigation for the transport of those products. Madhyamgram was also notable for its fine embroidery works that attracted appreciation from Delhi and Bombay (now Mumbai). Many families maintained a livelihood through those works.

== Geography ==
Cities, towns and locations in Barasat subdivision, North 24 Parganas
M: municipal town, CT: census town, R: rural/ urban centre, H: historical centre
Owing to space constraints in the small map, the actual locations in a larger map may vary slightly

=== Location ===
Madhyamgram is bounded by Barasat II in the east; Barasat II, Rajarhat (community development block), Bidhannagar Municipal Corporation and North Dum Dum in the south; New Barrackpore and Barrackpore II in the west and Barasat in the north.

=== Area overview ===
The area covered in the map alongside is largely a part of the north Bidyadhari Plain. located in the lower Ganges Delta. The country is flat. It is a little raised above flood level and the highest ground borders the river channels. 54.67% of the people of the densely populated area live in the urban areas and 45.33% in the rural areas.

Note: The map alongside presents some of the notable locations in the subdivision. All places marked in the map are linked in the larger full screen map.

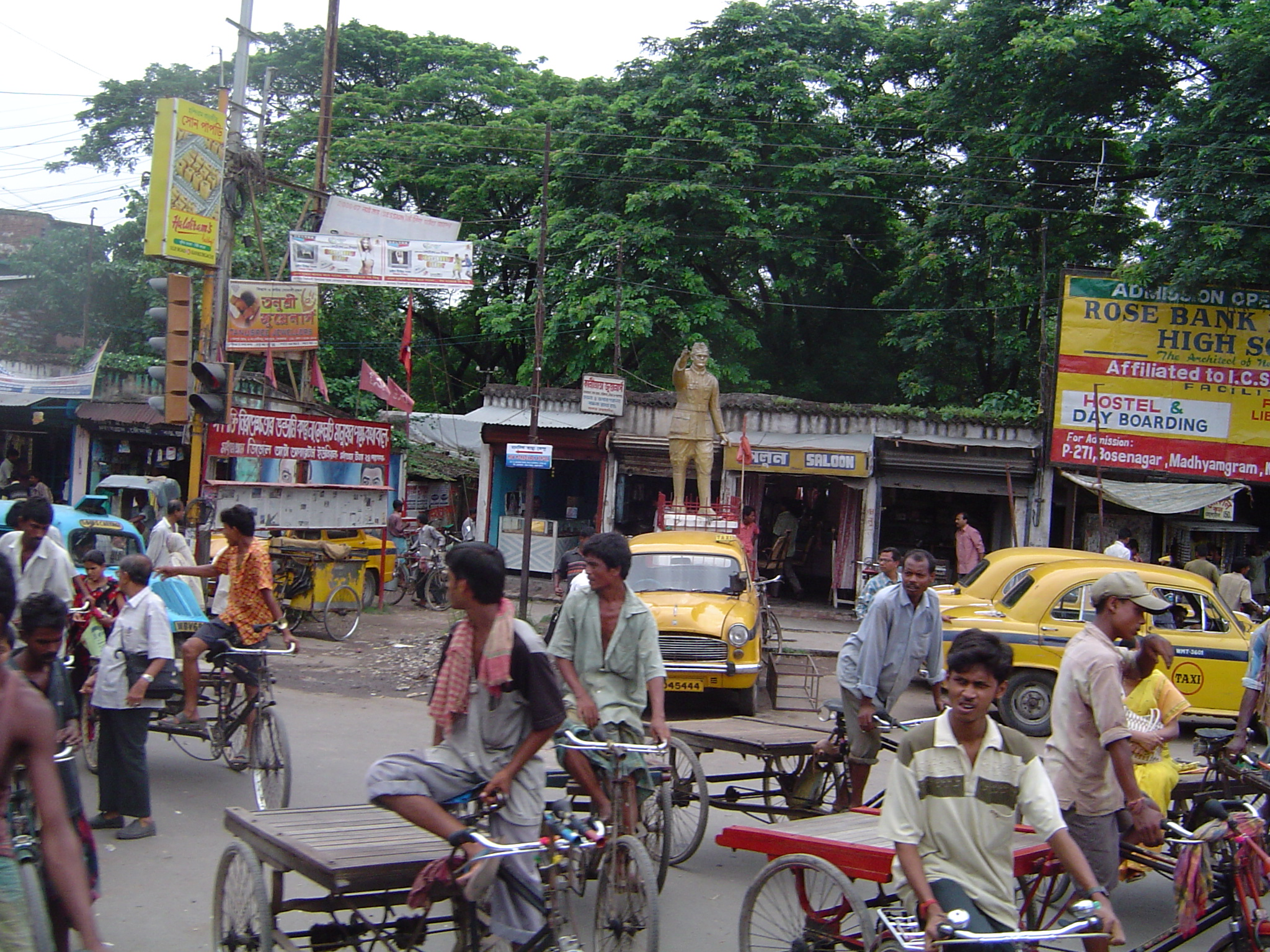
Madhyamgram Crossing on Jessore Road; Traffic jam, including the "Cycle-van"s

=== Climate ===
The climate is tropical, like the rest of the Gangetic West Bengal. The hallmark season is the Monsoon—which occurs from early June to mid September. The weather remains dry during the winter (mid-November to mid-February) and humid during summer.

Temperature: 41 °C in May (max) and 8.3 °C in January (min).

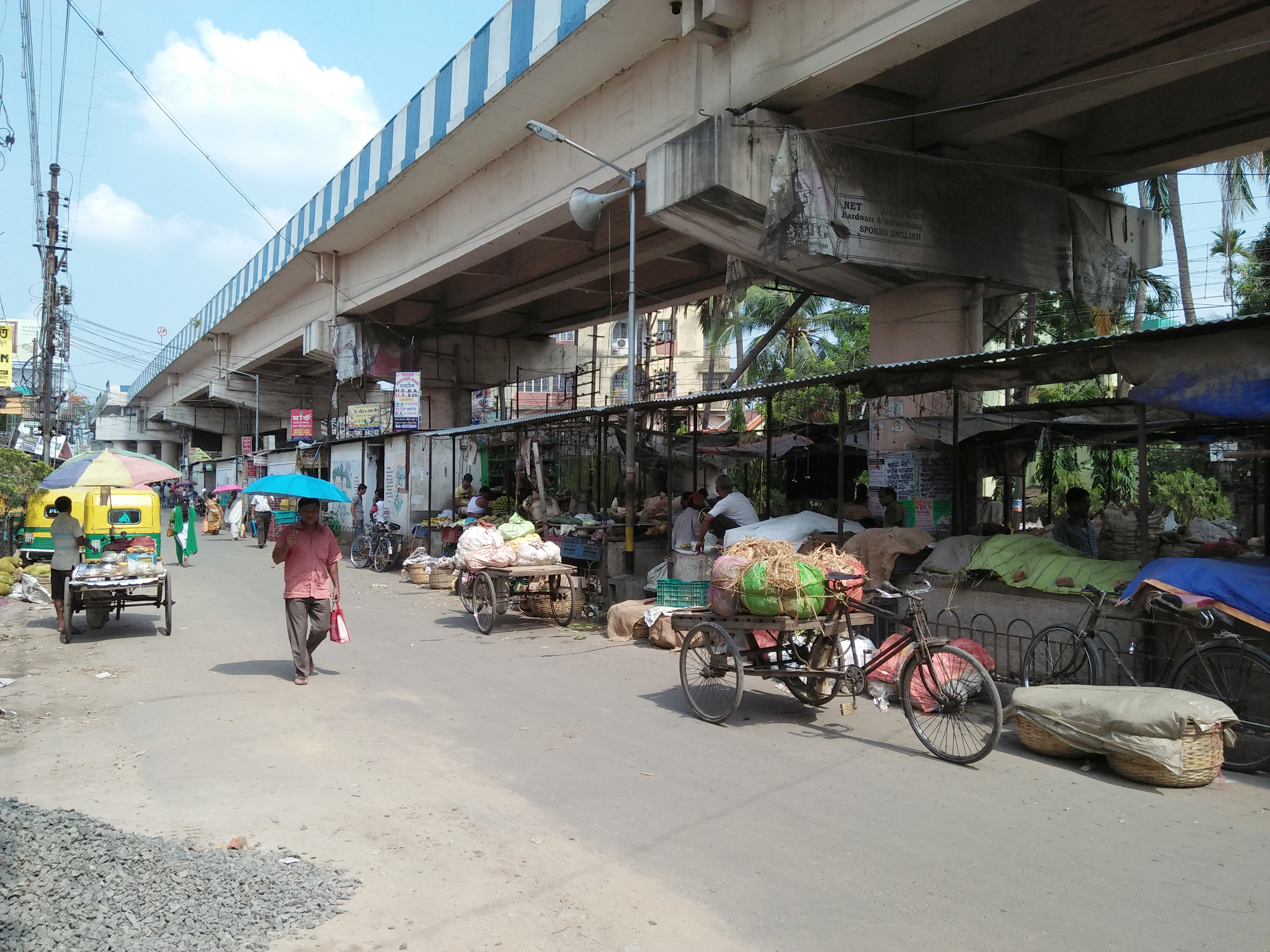
Madhyamgram Rail Overbridge and Market, Sodepur-Barasat Road

== Demographics ==
=== Population ===
Historical population
Year	Pop.	±%
1961	18,483	—
1971	31,629	+71.1%
1981	47,914	+51.5%
1991	79,844	+66.6%
2001	155,451	+94.7%
2011	196,127	+26.2%
2021	254,000	+29.5%
2022	261,000	+2.8%
Source: Government of India

According to the 2011 Census of India, Madhyamgram had a total population of 196,127, of which 98,864 were males and 97,263 were females. Population in the age range 0 to 6 years was 16,351. The total number of literate persons in Madhyamgram was 161,087. The effective literacy (7+) of population over 6 years of age was 89.60%. The Scheduled Castes and Scheduled Tribes population was 24,822 and 2,842 respectively. Madhyamgram had a total of 48942 households as of 2011. "Madhyamgram Municipality City Population Census 2011-2025". census2011.co.in. "Population projections based on 2011 census"

As of the 2001 Indian census, Madhyamgram had a population of 198,964. Males constitute 51% of the population and females 49%. Madhyamgram has an average literacy rate of 76%, higher than the national average of 59.5%: male literacy is 80% and female literacy is 71%. In Madhyamgram, 10% of the population is under 6 years of age.

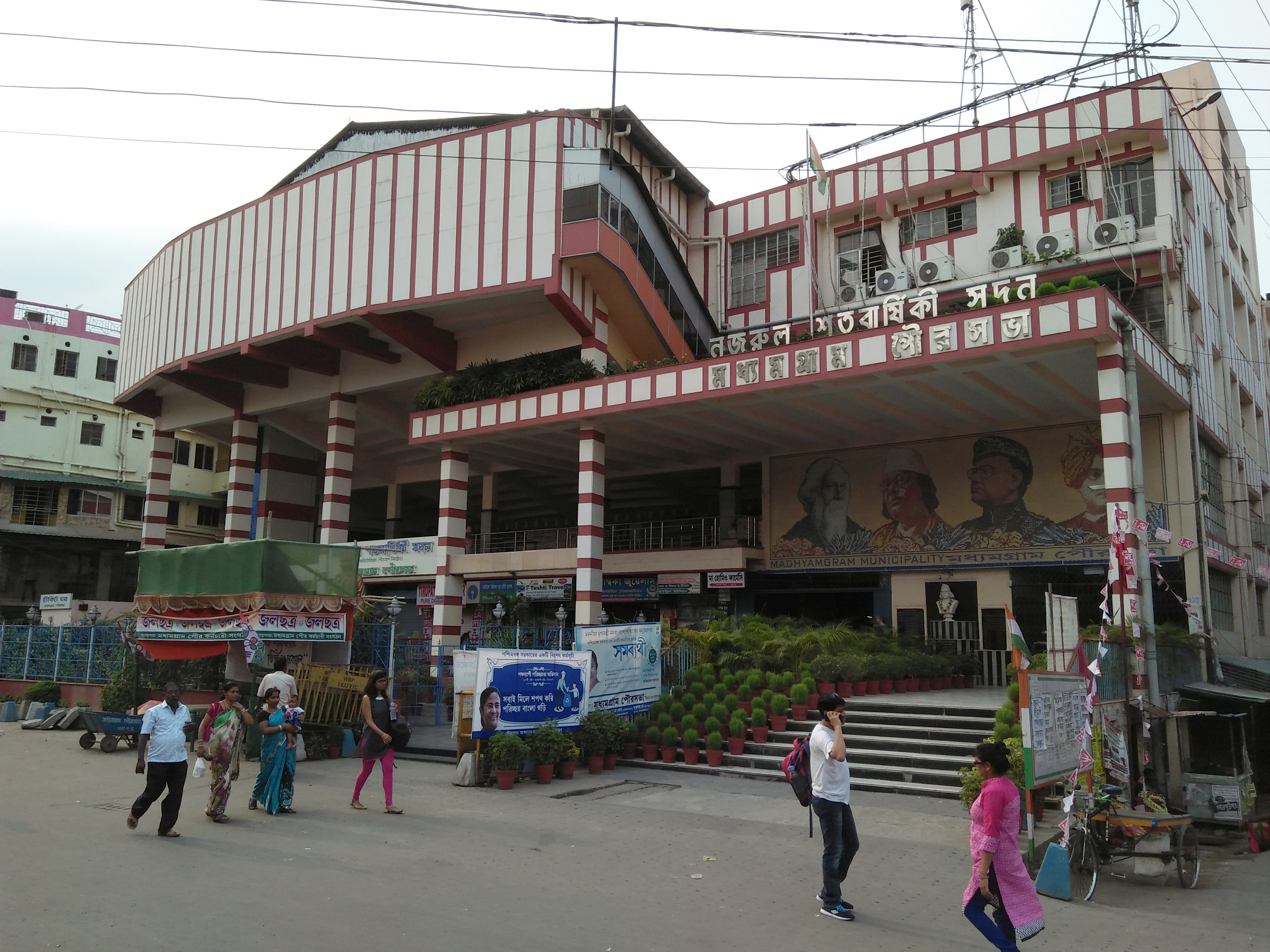
Nazrul Shatabarshiki Sadan, Sodepur-Barasat Road, Madhyamgram

=== Kolkata Urban Agglomeration ===
The following Municipalities and Census Town in Barasat Sadar subdivision were part of Kolkata Urban Agglomeration in the 2011 census: Barasat (M), Madhyamgram (M), Rajarhat-Gopalpur (M) (merged with Bidhannagar Municipal Corporation in 2015) and Raigachhi (CT).

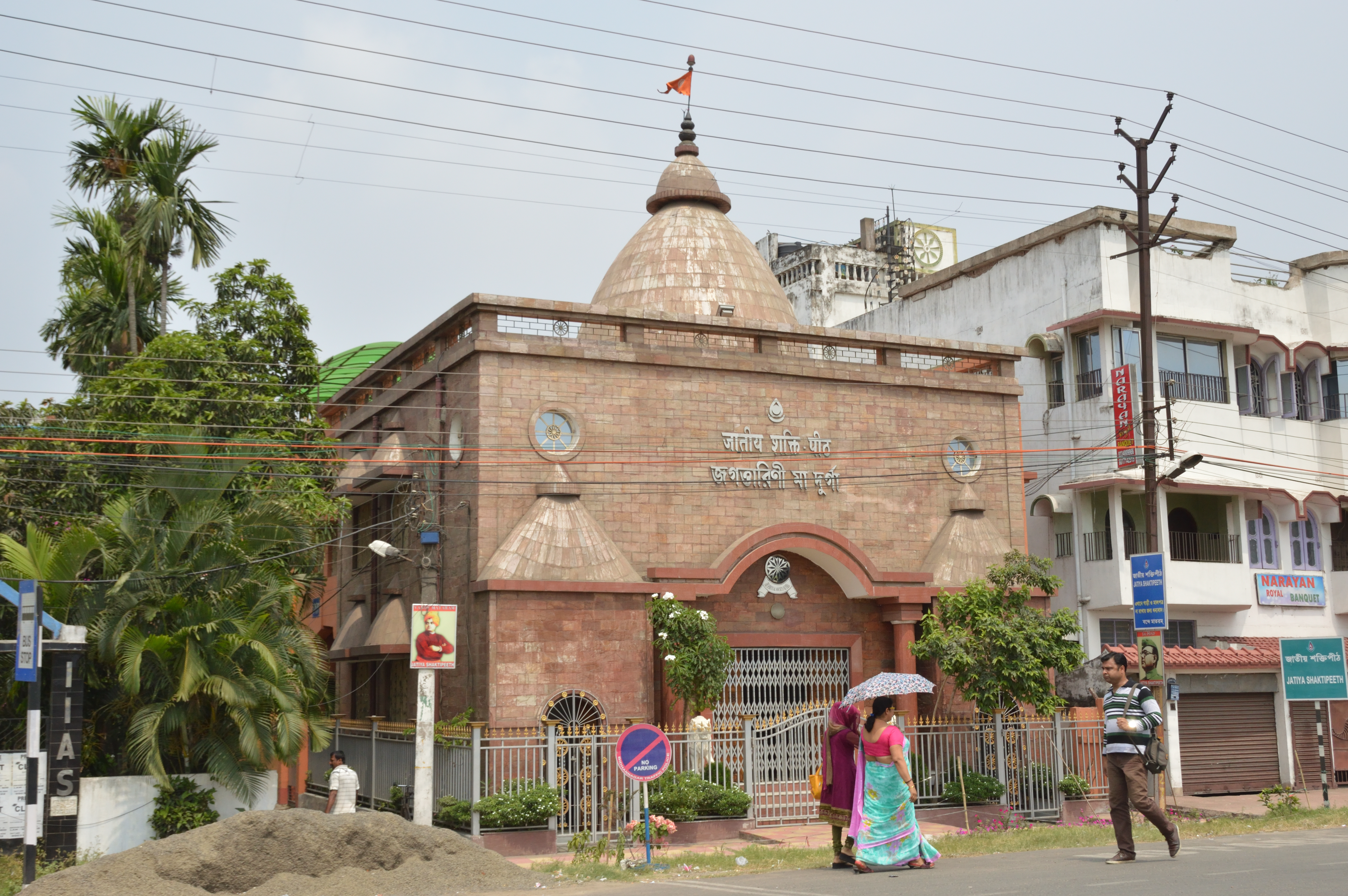
Jatiya Shakti Peeth (Jagattarini Maa Durga), Jessore Road, Michael Nagar, Madhyamgram

== Administration ==
=== Police station ===
Madhyamgram police station serves a population of 198,964. It has jurisdiction over Madhyamgram Municipal area and Barasat II CD Block.

== Economy ==
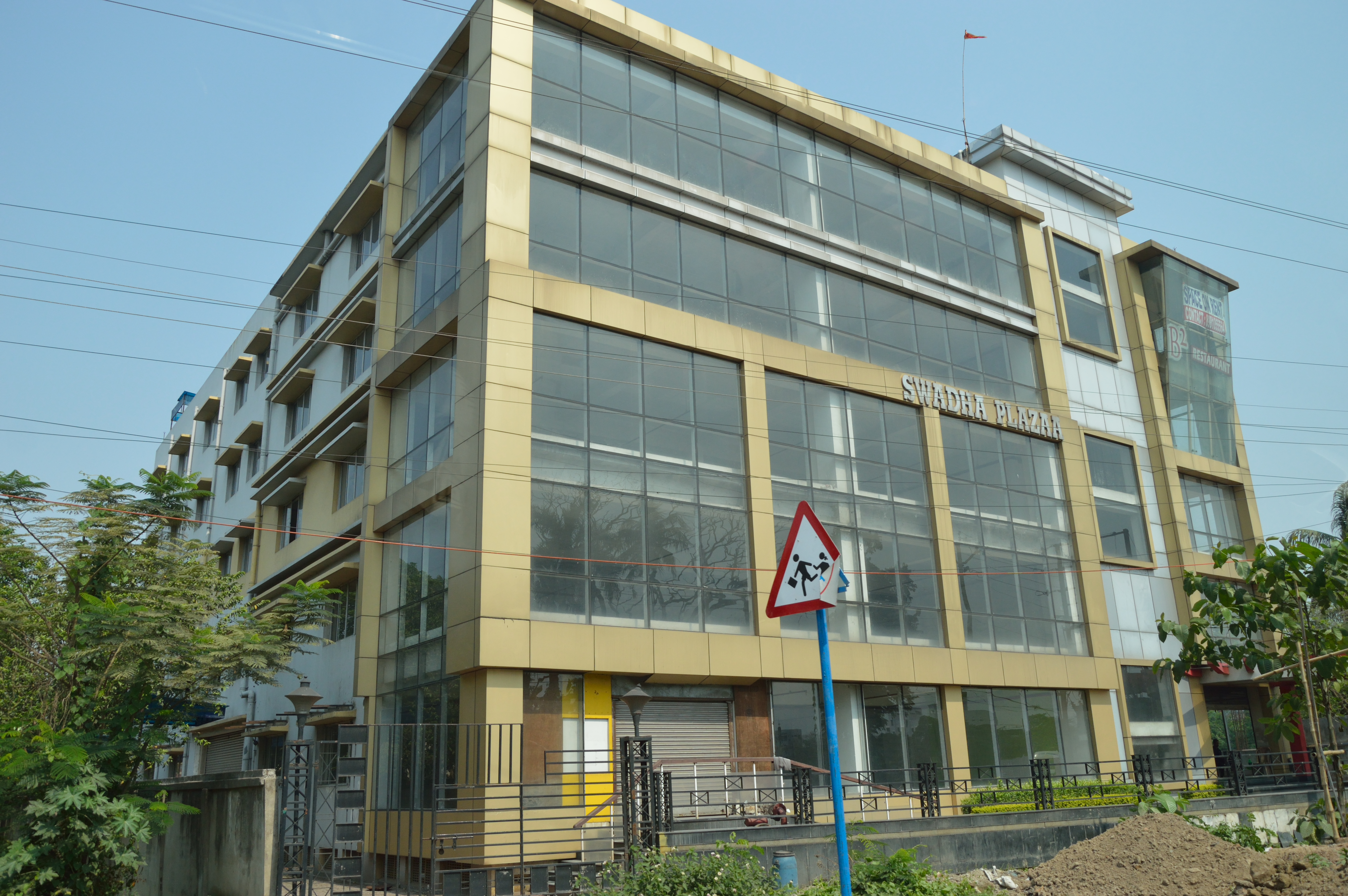
Swadha Plaza, Madhyamgram

There is a major textile mill and a rubber factory in this area. Star Mall is located in Madhyamgram on Jessore Road. The mall was launched in 2008 and has a gross leasable area of 237,000 sqft.

== Transport ==
Madhyamgram is characterised by its close proximity to an airport (Kolkata Airport) (around 15 minutes). Madhyamgram is a four-point junction of Jessore Road (part of State Highway 12), Sodepur-Barasat Road and Badu Road. East and west parts of Madhyamgram are connected with a Rail Overbridge (Madhyamgram Bridge), which was opened in 2006.

Many private and governmental public buses serve the town. Taxi services are one of the most popular forms of transportation to reach nearby towns like Sodepur, New Barrackpore and Barasat. Rickshaws, three-wheeled pedalled vans and battery-operated e-rickshaws ("toto" vans) are also used for short distances.

Madhyamgram railway station on the Sealdah–Hasnabad–Bangaon–Ranaghat line serves the town.

== Emergency medical care ==
Madhyamgram Rural Hospital, Badu Rd, Netaji Nagar, Madhyamgram, Kolkata, West Bengal 700129

Narayana Hospital, 78, Jessore Rd, Barasat, Kolkata, West Bengal 700127

Jeevan Arogya Hospital, 32R, Badu Rd, Madhyamgram, Badu, West Bengal 700128

Bengal Neuro Institute Hospital, 235, Jessore Road, Michael Nagar., Michael Nagar Bus Stand., Kolkata, West Bengal 700133

Heartland Hospital, 364, S, Rammohan Estate Burir Bagan, 42, Jessore Rd, Purbalaya, South Bankimpally, Madhyamgram, Kolkata, West Bengal 700129

Madhyamgram Matrisadan Hospital, 1, Sodepur Rd, opposite MatriSadan Hospital, Basunagar, Madhyamgram, Kolkata, West Bengal 700129

== Education ==
Vivekananda College is a degree college in Madhyamgram. The engineering college Camellia Institute of Technology and the management college Camellia School Of Business Management are also located here.

BCDA College of Pharmacy & Technology Campus, 52, C/10, Ghoshpara Rd, Udairajpur, Madhyamgram, Kolkata, West Bengal 700129

== Sports ==
Madhyamgram High School has won the Subroto Cup, an all-India inter-school soccer competition, seven times, which includes a hat-trick (in the years 1981, 1982 and 1983).
