= Shasan, North 24 Parganas =

Shasan
- Village
- Location in West Bengal, India Shasan (India)
- Coordinates: 22.665732°N 88.582628°E
- Country: India
- State: West Bengal
- District: North 24 Parganas

Population (2011)
  - Total: 5,818

Languages
  - Official: Bengali, English
- Time zone: UTC+5:30 (IST)
- PIN: 743423 (Shasan)
- Telephone/STD code: 03217
- Lok Sabha constituency: Basirhat
- Vidhan Sabha constituency: Haroa
- Website: north24parganas.nic.in

Shasan is a village and a gram panchayat in the Barasat II CD block in the Barasat Sadar subdivision of the North 24 Parganas district in the state of West Bengal, India.

== Geography ==
Cities, towns and locations in Barasat subdivision, North 24 Parganas
M: municipal town, CT: census town, R: rural/ urban centre, H: historical centre
Owing to space constraints in the small map, the actual locations in a larger map may vary slightly

=== Location ===
Shasan is located at 22.665732°N 88.582628°E.

=== Area overview ===
The area covered in the map alongside is largely a part of the north Bidyadhari Plain. located in the lower Ganges Delta. The country is flat. It is a little raised above flood level and the highest ground borders the river channels. 54.67% of the people of the densely populated area lives in the urban areas and 45.33% lives in the rural areas.

Note: The map alongside presents some of the notable locations in the subdivision. All places marked in the map are linked in the larger full screen map.

== Civic administration ==
=== Police station ===
Shashan police station serves a total population of 139,328. It has jurisdiction over Barasat II CD block.

== Demographics ==
According to the 2011 Census of India, Sasan had a total population of 5,818, of which 2,957 (51%) were males and 2,861 (49%) were females. Population in the age range 0–6 years was 776. The total number of literate persons in Sasan was 3,948 (78.30% of the population over 6 years).

== Transport ==
Local roads connect Shasan to State Highway 2 (locally known as Taki Road).

Sondalia, a station on the Barasat-Hasnabad line, which is part the Kolkata Suburban Railway railway system, is located nearby.

== Healthcare ==
Mitpukuria primary health centre at Shasan functions with 10 beds.
