= Tanmoy Mondal =

Indian politician

MLA
- In office 2001–2006
- Preceded by: Rabindranath Mondal
- Succeeded by: Rabindranath Mondal
- Constituency: Rajarhat Gopalpur

Personal details
- Party: All India Trinamool Congress

Tanmoy Mondal is an Indian politician belonging to All India Trinamool Congress. He was elected as a legislator of West Bengal Legislative Assembly from Rajarhat Gopalpur (Vidhan Sabha constituency) between 2001 and 2006. He was suspended from Trinamool Congress for corruption charge on 23 August 2009. His suspension order was withdrawn on 10 June 2018.

State Legislative Assembly
| Preceded by Rabindranath Mondal | Member of the West Bengal Legislative Assembly from Rajarhat Gopalpur Assembly constituency 2001 – 2006 | Succeeded by Rabindranath Mondal |
