= Tapash Chatterjee =

Indian politician

Tapash Chatterjee (born 1972) is an Indian politician from West Bengal. He is a member of the West Bengal Legislative Assembly from Rajarhat New Town Assembly constituency in North 24 Parganas district. He won the 2021 West Bengal Legislative Assembly election representing the All India Trinamool Congress party.

== Early life and education ==
Chatterjee is from Rajarhat New Town, North 24 Parganas district, West Bengal. He is the son of late Pannalal Chatterjee. He completed his bachelor's degree in commerce in 1981 at a college affiliated with Calcutta University.

== Career ==
Chatterjee won from Rajarhat New Town Assembly constituency representing the All India Trinamool Congress in the 2021 West Bengal Legislative Assembly election. He polled 1,27,374 votes and defeated his nearest rival, Bhaskar Roy of the Bharatiya Janata Party, by a margin of 56,432 votes. In 2011, he contested on CPI (M) seat and lost to Sabyasachi Dutta of the Trinamool Congress by a margin of 7,747 votes.
