= Krishna Chakraborty =

Indian politician

Mayor of Bidhannagar
- In office 10 August 2019 – 4 June 2026
- Preceded by: Sabyasachi Dutta
- Succeeded by: TBD

Personal details
- Born: Bidhannagar, West Bengal
- Party: Trinamool Congress
- Occupation: Politician

Krishna Chakraborty is an Indian politician from West Bengal. She had served as the Mayor of Bidhannagar Municipal Corporation from 10 August 2019 to 4 June 2026. She resigned as the Mayor of Bidhannagar Municipal Corporation due to some personal reasons as stated by her.
