= Rabindranath Mondal =

Indian politician

Rabindranath Mondal (1941 – 2024) is an Indian politician from West Bengal. He is a seven–time member of the West Bengal Legislative Assembly from Rajarhat New Town Assembly constituency in North 24 Parganas district. He last won the 2006 West Bengal Legislative Assembly election representing the Communist Party of India (Marxist) party.

== Early life and education ==
Mondal is from Jibantala village, Canning II block, South 24 Parganas district. He is the son of late Shridhar Mondal.

== Career ==
Mondal won seven time from Rajarhat Assembly Constituency from 1969 to 2006. From 2011, the constituency was renamed as Rajarhat New Town Assembly constituency after delimitation. He first won the 1969 West Bengal Legislative Assembly election on the Communist Party of India (Marxist) seat but lost the next two elections to Indian National Congress candidate Khagendranath Mondal. He regained the seat in 1977 for the second time and thereafter was elected for four more consecutive terms winning the 1982, 1987, 1991 and 1996 elections. He lost the 2001 election to Trinamool Congress candidate Tanmoy Mondal but won it again for the seventh time in the 2006 West Bengal Legislative Assembly election. However, he lost the 2011 election to Purnendu Bose. In 2006, he polled 101,621 votes and defeated his nearest rival, Tanmoy Mondal of the Trinamool Congress by a margin of 16,809 votes. Later, he joined Trinamool Congress.

=== Death ===
Mondal was found dead near his house in Canning's Jibantala village on 24 June 2024.
