= Deara =

- Census Town
- Location in West Bengal, India Deara (India)
- Coordinates: 22.640278°N 88.4875°E
- Country: India
- State: West Bengal
- District: North 24 Parganas

Population (2011)
  - Total: 11,994

Languages
  - Official: Bengali, English
- Time zone: UTC+5:30 (IST)
- PIN: 700135
- Telephone code: +91 33
- Vehicle registration: WB
- Lok Sabha constituency: Barasat
- Vidhan Sabha constituency: Madhyamgram
- Website: north24parganas.nic.in

Deara is a census town in the Barasat II CD block in the Barasat Sadar subdivision in the North 24 Parganas district in the Indian state of West Bengal.

== Geography ==
Cities, towns and locations in Barasat subdivision, North 24 Parganas
M: municipal town, CT: census town, R: rural/ urban centre, H: historical centre
Owing to space constraints in the small map, the actual locations in a larger map may vary slightly

=== Location ===
Deara is located at 22.640278°N 88.4875°E.

=== Area overview ===
The area covered in the map alongside is largely a part of the north Bidyadhari Plain. located in the lower Ganges Delta. The country is flat. It is a little raised above flood level and the highest ground borders the river channels.54.67% of the people of the densely populated area lives in the urban areas and 45.33% lives in the rural areas.

Note: The map alongside presents some of the notable locations in the subdivision. All places marked in the map are linked in the larger full screen map.

== Demographics ==
As of 2011 India census, Deara had a population of 11,994; of this, 6,018 are male, 5,976 female. It has an average literacy rate of 60.64%, lower than the national average of 74.04%.

== Infrastructure ==
As per te District Census Handbook 2011, Deara covered an area of 2.5461 km^{2}. It had 5 primary schools, the nearest middle and secondary schools were 5 km away at Rohanda, the nearest senior secondary school was 3 km away at Rajarhat and the nearest degree college was 6 km away at Kalipark. The nearest hospital was 22 km away, the nearest dispensary/ health centre (without any bed) was 3 km away, the nearest family welfare centre was 4 km away, the nearest maternity and child welfare centre was 4 km away and the nearest maternity home was 4 km away.

== Transport ==
Local roads link Deara to State Highway 3.

== Healthcare ==
North 24 Parganas district has been identified as one of the areas where ground water is affected by arsenic contamination.

== See also ==
Map of Barasat II CD Block on Page 419 of District Census Handbook.
