= South Calcutta Law College =

Law college in West Bengal

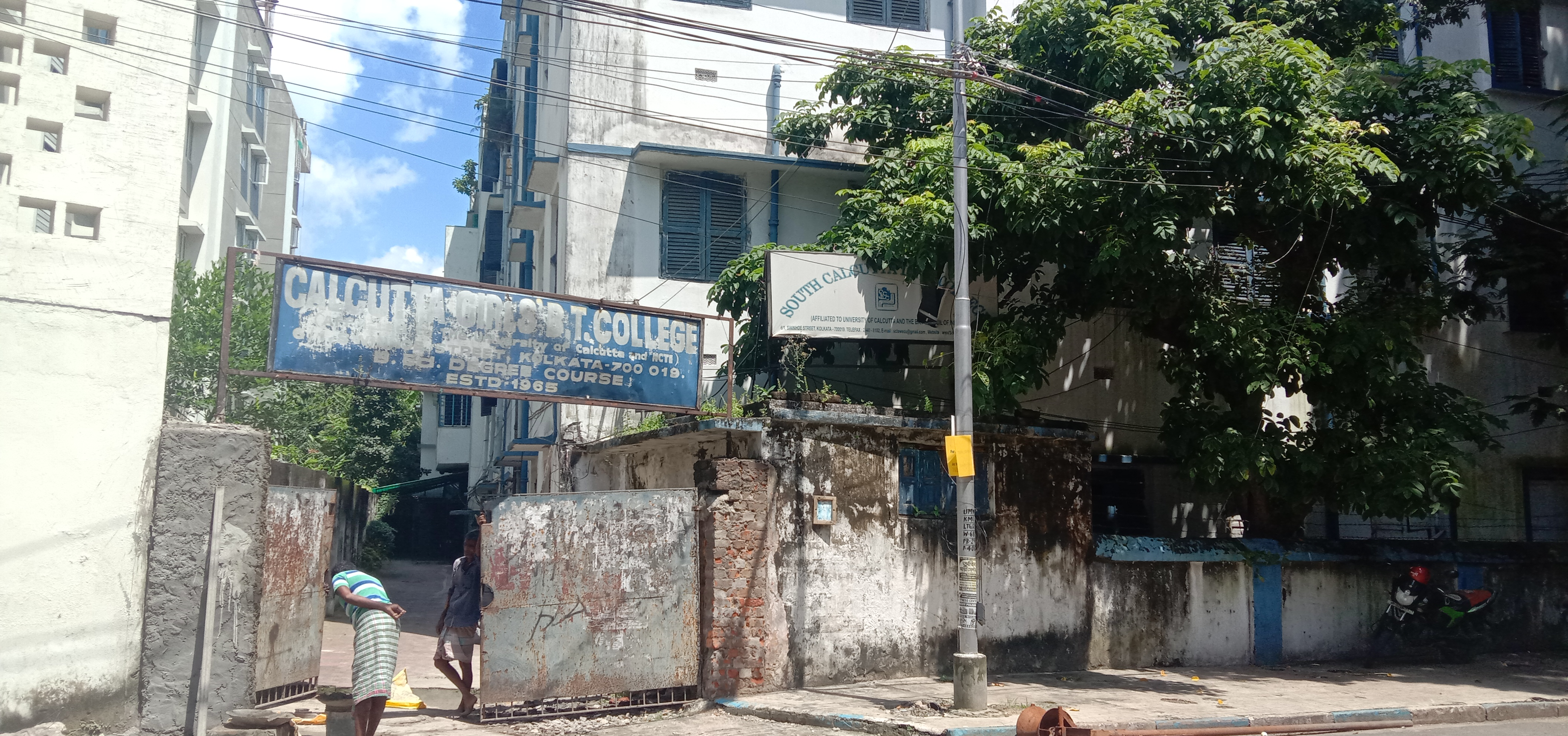
- Type: Public, Law college
- Established: 1970; 56 years ago
- Affiliations: Bar Council of India
- Academic affiliations: University of Calcutta
- Vice-Principal: Nayna Chatterji
- Location: Kolkata, West Bengal, India; 22.5248925°N 88.3689527°E
- Website: Official site
- Location within Kolkata Location within India

South Calcutta Law College is a public law college located in Kolkata, West Bengal, India. It is affiliated with the University of Calcutta and offers undergraduate and postgraduate law courses. The college was established in 1970 and provides facilities including a library, moot court hall, computer lab, and auditorium.

== Academics ==
The college offers a five-year integrated B.A. LL.B. (Hons.) program and a two-year LL.M. course, with admission based on the entrance test.

=== Subject ===
- Law
- English
- Political science
- Sociology
- Economics

== Campus ==
The campus includes classrooms, seminar halls, legal aid clinics, and recreational facilities.

== Rankings ==
In 2019, India Today ranked South Calcutta Law College 34th among law colleges in India.

== Controversy ==
In June 2025, the college was in the news after a female student alleged that she was gang-raped on campus. Multiple arrests were made, including a college staff member and students.
