= Basina Kloos =

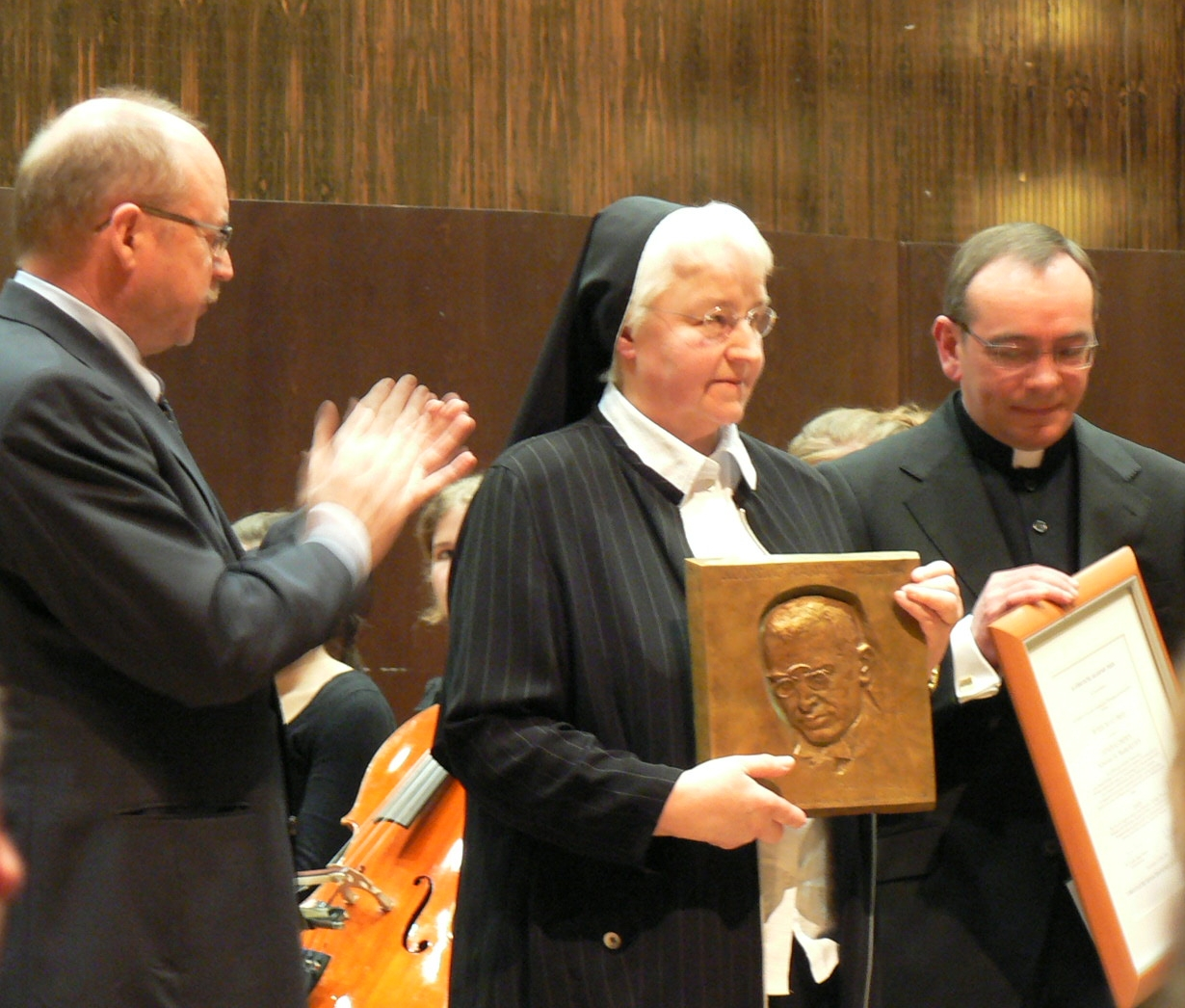
Sister Maria Basina Kloos was awarded the Peter Wust prize on 29 March 2009.

Maria Basina Kloos FBMVA (born Dorothea Kloos in February 1940) is a German religious sister. She has served several terms as Superior general of the Waldbreitbacher Franciscan sisters between 1988 and 1994, and again between 2000 and 2012.

== Biography ==
Dorothea Kloos was born in Bad Gams, a small market town nearby Graz in Austria. Slightly unusually, the family into which she was born was both Catholic and Protestant. She grew up in Idar-Oberstein, a town in the hills north of Saarbrücken. When she was young, Kloos planned to become a criminologist and sat the necessary exam to embark on the training, then she determined to become a teacher.

In 1957, when she was 17, she entered the Waldbreitbacher Franciscan community, taking the religious name Maria Basina. Her management skills seem to have been spotted early on: at the age of 23, she was entrusted the charge of the commercial and administrative functions at one of the hospitals of the congregation. Between 1976 and 1988 she served as vicar general of the congregation. In 1988, she was appointed Superior general, serving till 1994. She served as general secreatary to the German conference of major religious superiors between 1995 and 1998. She served a further term as Superior general from 2000 till 2012.

In August 2012 Basina Kloos took over as co-managing director of the Marienhaus Gesundheits- und Sozialholding GmbH company in Trier, one of the largest Christian social welfare institutions in Germany. She stepped down from the post in 2015, a few months after her 75th birthday.

== Awards and honours (selection) ==
- 2005: Johanna Loewenherz prize
- 2009: Peter Wust prize
- 2011: Order of Merit of the Federal Republic of Germany 1st class
- 2012: Saarland Order of Merit
- 2015: Honorary doctorate from the Vallendar Philosophical-Theological Academy
