= Rajarhat (community development block) =

- Community development block
- Interactive map of Rajarhat
- Coordinates: 22°36′33″N 88°31′37″E
- Country: India
- State: West Bengal
- District: North 24 Parganas

Government
  - Type: Representative democracy

Area
  - Total: 72.90 km^{2} (28.15 sq mi)

Population (2011)
  - Total: 189,893
  - Density: 2,605/km^{2} (6,747/sq mi)

Languages
  - Official: Bengali, English

Literacy (2011)
  - Total literates: 139,571 (83.13%)
- Time zone: UTC+5:30 (IST)
- PIN: 700135 (Rajarhat)
- Telephone/STD code: 03174
- ISO 3166 code: IN-WB
- Vehicle registration: WB-23, WB-24, WB-25, WB-26
- Lok Sabha constituency: Barasat
- Vidhan Sabha constituency: Rajarhat New Town
- Website: north24parganas.nic.in

Rajarhat is a community development block that forms an administrative division in Bidhannagar subdivision of North 24 Parganas district in the Indian state of West Bengal.

== Geography ==
Rajarhat Bishnupur, a constituent panchayat in Rajarhat block, is located at 22°36′37″N 88°31′37″E.

Rajarhat CD Block is bounded by Barasat II CD Block in the north, Bhangar II CD Block in South 24 Parganas district in the east and south, Rajarhat-Gopalpur Municipality and Bidhannagar municipality (both part of Bidhannagar Municipal Corporation since 2015) in the west.

Rajarhat CD Block is part of the North Hooghly Flat, one of the three physiographic regions in the district located in the lower Ganges Delta. It is a raised alluvium area along the Hooghly, which forms the western boundary of the district.

Rajarhat CD Block has an area of 72.90 km^{2}(according to 2011 census, including Mahisbathan II). It has 1 panchayat samity, 6 gram panchayats (now 5), 99 gram sansads (village councils), 39 mouzas and 38 inhabited villages, as per the District Statistical Handbook: North 24 Parganas. Rajarhat police station serves this block. Headquarters of this CD Block is at Rajarhat.

=== Gram panchayats ===
Gram panchayats of Rajarhat block/ panchayat samiti are: Chandpur, Rajarhat Bishnupur I, Rajarhat Bishnupur II, Jangrahatiara II, Patharghata and Mahisbathan II (now under Bidhannagar Municipal Corporation and is now ward no 27 of BMC),

== Demographics ==
=== Population ===
As per 2011 Census of India Rajarhat CD Block had a total population of 189,893, of which 89,607 were rural and 100,286 were urban. There were 97,623 (51%) males and 92,210 (49%) females. Population below 6 years was 22,003. Scheduled Castes numbered 65,551 (35.05%) and Scheduled Tribes numbered 1,174 (0.62%).

As per 2001 census, Rajarhat block has a total population of 145,357 out of which 75,142 were males and 72,709 were females. Population of the rural areas in the block was 138,629 and that of the urban areas was 6,728.

There are several census towns in Rajarhat CD Block (2011 census figures in brackets): Raigachhi (8,254), Rekjuani (16,553), Bhatenda (6,349), Basina (5,413), Bishnupur (12,660), Chandpur Champagachhi (6,431), Jatragachhi (6,890), Ghuni (24,249) and Sulanggari (13,496).

Large villages in Rajarhat CD Block (2011 census figures in brackets): Thakdari (4,247), Mahisgot (7,224), Tarulia (4,278), Mahammadpur (4,141), Chakpachuria (5,024), Baligari (4,193), Patharghata (8,039) and Bagdobamachhi Bhanga (4,483).

North 24 Parganas district is densely populated, mainly because of the influx of refugees from East Pakistan (later Bangladesh). With a density of population of 2,182 per km^{2} in 1971, it was 3rd in terms of density per km^{2} in West Bengal after Kolkata and Howrah, and 20th in India. According to the District Human Development Report: North 24 Parganas, “High density is also explained partly by the rapid growth of urbanization in the district. In 1991, the percentage of urban population in the district has been 51.23.”

Decadal Population Growth Rate (%)

The decadal growth of population in Rajarhat CD Block in 2001-2011 was 30.62%. The decadal growth of population in Rajarhat CD Block in 1991-2001 was -49.18%. Rajarhat-Gopalpur Municipality with a population of 271,881 in 2001, came up largely in 1991-2001 decade.

The decadal growth rate of population in North 24 Parganas district was as follows: 47.9% in 1951-61, 34.5% in 1961-71, 31.4% in 1971-81, 31.7% in 1981-91, 22.7% in 1991-2001 and 12.0% in 2001-11. The decadal growth rate for West Bengal in 2001-11 was 13.93%. The decadal growth rate for West Bengal was 17.84% in 1991-2001, 24.73% in 1981-1991 and 23.17% in 1971-1981.

Only a small portion of the border with Bangladesh has been fenced and it is popularly referred to as a porous border. It is freely used by Bangladeshi infiltrators, terrorists, smugglers, criminals et al.

=== Literacy ===
As per the 2011 census, the total number of literates in Rajarhat CD Block was 139,571 (83.13% of the population over 6 years) out of which males numbered 75,258 (87.25% of the male population over 6 years) and females numbered 64,313 (78.78% of the female population over 6 years). The gender disparity (the difference between female and male literacy rates) was 8.47%.

See also – List of West Bengal districts ranked by literacy rate

Literacy in CD blocks of
North 24 Parganas district
Barasat Sadar subdivision
Amdanga – 80.69%
Deganga – 79.65%
Barasat I – 81.50%
Barasat II – 77.71%
Habra I – 83.15%
Habra II – 81.05%
Rajarhat – 83.13%
Basirhat subdivision
Baduria – 78.75%
Basirhat I – 72.10%
Basirhat II – 78.30%
Haroa – 73.13%
Hasnabad – 71.47%
Hingalganj – 76.85%
Minakhan – 71.33%
Sandeshkhali I – 71.08%
Sandeshkhali II – 70.96%
Swarupnagar – 77.57%
Bangaon subdivision
Bagdah – 75.30%
Bangaon – 79.71%
Gaighata – 82.32%
Barrackpore subdivision
Barrackpore I – 85.91%
Barrackpore II – 84.53%
Source: 2011 Census: CD Block Wise
Primary Census Abstract Data

=== Language and religion ===
Religion in Rajarhat CD block (2011)
Hinduism	59.41%
Islam	39.90%
Other or not stated	0.69%

In the 2011 census Hindus numbered 112,824 and formed 59.41% of the population in Rajarhat CD Block. Muslims numbered 75,763 and formed 39.90% of the population. Others numbered 1,306 and formed 0.69% of the population.

In 1981 Hindus numbered 104,432 and formed 63.99% of the population and Muslims numbered 58,298 and formed 35.82% of the population. In 1991 Hindus numbered 214,970 and formed 75.15% of the population and Muslims numbered 69,588 and formed 24.33% of the population in Rajarhat CD Block. (1981 and 1991 census was conducted as per jurisdiction of the police station). In 2001, Hindus were 84,153 (57.88%) and Muslims 60,108 (41.35%).

Languages in Rajarhat CD block (2011)
1. Bengali (95.6%)
2. Hindi (1.98%)
3. Urdu (1.81%)
4. Others (0.57%)

At the time of the 2011 census, 95.64% of the population spoke Bengali, 1.98% Hindi and 1.81% Urdu as their first language.

== Rural Poverty ==
22.60% of households in Rajarhat CD Block lived below poverty line in 2001, against an average of 29.28% in North 24 Parganas district.

== Economy ==
=== Livelihood ===
Livelihood
in Rajarhat CD Block
1. Cultivators (4.72%)
2. Agricultural labourers (5.07%)
3. Household industries (3.36%)
4. Other Workers (86.9%)

In Rajarhat CD Block in 2011, amongst the class of total workers, cultivators numbered 3,001 and formed 4.72% of the total workers, agricultural labourers numbered 3,223 and formed 5.07%, household industry workers numbered 2,135 and formed 3.36% and other workers numbered 55,242 and formed 86.86%. Total workers numbered 63,601 and formed 33.49% of the total population, and non-workers numbered 126,292 and formed 66.51% of the population.

In more than 30 percent of the villages in North 24 Parganas, agriculture or household industry is no longer the major source of livelihood for the main workers there. The CD Blocks in the district can be classified as belonging to three categories: border areas, Sundarbans area and other rural areas. The percentage of other workers in the other rural areas category is considerably higher than those in the border areas and Sundarbans area.

Note: In the census records a person is considered a cultivator, if the person is engaged in cultivation/ supervision of land owned by self/government/institution. When a person who works on another person’s land for wages in cash or kind or share, is regarded as an agricultural labourer. Household industry is defined as an industry conducted by one or more members of the family within the household or village, and one that does not qualify for registration as a factory under the Factories Act. Other workers are persons engaged in some economic activity other than cultivators, agricultural labourers and household workers. It includes factory, mining, plantation, transport and office workers, those engaged in business and commerce, teachers, entertainment artistes and so on.

=== Infrastructure ===
There are 30 inhabited villages in Rajarhat CD Block, as per the District Census Handbook: North 24 Parganas. 100% villages have power supply and drinking water supply. 11 villages (36.67%) have post offices. 23 villages (76.67%) have telephones (including landlines, public call offices and mobile phones). 24 villages (80.00%) have a pucca approach road and 26 villages (86.67%) have transport communication (includes bus service, rail facility and navigable waterways). 9 villages (30.00%) have agricultural credit societies and 10 villages (33.33% ) have banks.

=== Agriculture ===
The North 24 Parganas district Human Development Report opines that in spite of agricultural productivity in North 24 Parganas district being rather impressive 81.84% of rural population suffered from shortage of food. With a high urbanisation of 54.3% in 2001, the land use pattern in the district is changing quite fast and the area under cultivation is declining. However, agriculture is still the major source of livelihood in the rural areas of the district.

From 1977 on wards major land reforms took place in West Bengal. Land in excess of land ceiling was acquired and distributed amongst the peasants. Following land reforms land ownership pattern has undergone transformation. In 2010-11, persons engaged in agriculture in Rajarhat CD Block could be classified as follows: bargadars 1,781 (11.86%), patta (document) holders 2,113 (14.08%), small farmers (possessing land between 1 and 2 hectares) 10 (0.07%), marginal farmers (possessing land up to 1 hectare) 3,890 (25.91%) and agricultural labourers 7,217 (48.08%).

Rajarhat CD Block had 58 fair price shops in 2010-11.

In 2010-11, Rajarhat CD Block produced 4,237 tonnes of Aman paddy, the main winter crop from 1,748 hectares, 3,656 tonnes of Boro paddy (spring crop) from 1,114 hectares, 1,732 tonnes of Aus paddy (summer crop) from 750 hectares, 98 tonnes of wheat from 40 hectares, 2,130 tonnes of jute from 118 hectares and 549 tonnes of potatoes from 25 hectares. It also produced pulses and oilseeds.

In 2010-11, the total area irrigated in Rajarhat CD Block was 34 hectares, out of which 20 hectares were irrigated by river lift irrigation and 14 hectares by deep tube well.

=== Pisciculture ===
In 2010-11, the net area under effective pisciculture in Rajarhat CD Block was 1,197.91 hectares. 4,648 persons were engaged in the profession. Approximate annual production was 35,937.3 quintals.

=== Banking ===
In 2010-11, Rajarhat CD Block had offices of 5 commercial banks and 3 gramin banks.

== Transport ==
In 2010-11, Rajarhat CD Block had 1 originating/ terminating bus route. The nearest railway station is 22 km from CD Block headquarters.

SH 3 passes through this CD Block.

== Education ==
In 2010-11, Rajarhat CD Block had 60 primary schools with 8,090 students, 3 high schools with 2,208 students and 12 higher secondary schools with 22,822 students. Rajarhat CD Block had 1 professional/ technical institution with 72 students and 430 institutions for special and non-formal education with 15,705 students.

As per the 2011 census, in Rajarhat CD Block, amongst the 30 inhabited villages, 1 village did not have a school, 10 villages had more than 1 primary school, 11 villages had at least 1 primary and 1 middle school and 7 villages had at least 1 middle and 1 secondary school.

== Healthcare ==
In 2011, Rajarhat CD Block had 1 block primary health centre and 2 primary health centre, with total 15 beds and 4 doctors (excluding private bodies). It had 37 family welfare subcentres. 1,602 patients were treated indoors and 69,001 patients were treated outdoor in the hospitals, health centres and subcentres of the CD Block.

Rekjoani Rural Hospital at Rekjuani, Rajarhat with 30 beds functions as the main medical facility centre in Rajarhat CD Block. There are primary health centres at Badu (Chandpur PHC (Arbelia) with 10 beds) and Patharghata (with 10 beds).
