= Bidhannagar subdivision =

- Subdivision
- Interactive map of Bidhannagar subdivision
- Coordinates: 22.58°N 88.42°E
- Country: India
- State: West Bengal
- District: North 24 Parganas
- Headquarters: Bidhannagar

Government
  - Sub Divisional Officer and Sub Divisional Magistrate: Priyansha Garg, IAS

Area
  - Total: 33.5 km^{2} (12.9 sq mi)

Population (2011 Census)
  - Total: 215,514
  - Density: 6,430/km^{2} (16,700/sq mi)

Languages
  - Official: Bengali, English
- Time zone: UTC+5:30 (IST)
- ISO 3166 code: IN-WB
- Vehicle registration: WB
- Website: wb.gov.in

Bidhannagar subdivision is an administrative subdivision of the North 24 Parganas district in the Indian state of West Bengal. After transferring Rajarhat-Gopalpur Municipality and Rajarhat (Community development block) to Bidhannagar subdivision, Bidhannagar subdivision's total area becomes 141.37 km^{2} (54.58 sq mi), the population becomes 808,251 (2011 Census), and density becomes 5,700/km^{2} (15,000/sq mi). The current Sub Divisional Officer and Sub Divisional Magistrate is Priyansha Garg, IAS

== Subdivisions ==

North 24 Parganas district is divided into the following administrative subdivisions:

Subdivision	Headquarters	Area km^{2}	Population (2011)	Urban population % (2011)	Rural Population % (2011)
Bangaon	Bangaon	838.17	1,063,028	16.33	83.67
Barasat Sadar	Barasat	1,002.48	2,789,611	54.67	45.33
Barrackpore	Barrackpore	334.51	3,668,653	96.02	3.98
Bidhannagar	Bidhannagar	33.50	216,609	100.00	0
Basirhat	Basirhat	1,777.02	2,271,880	12.96	87.04
North 24 Parganas district	Barasat	4,094.00	10,009,781	57.27	42.73

Cities, towns and locations in Bidhannagar subdivision, North 24 Parganas
M: municipal town, CT: census town, R: rural/ urban centre, F: facilities
Abbreviation: UEM - University of Engineering & Management
Owing to space constraints in the small map, the actual locations in a larger map may vary slightly

== Religion ==
Given below is an overview of the religion-wise break-up of the population across the subdivisions of North 24 Parganas district, as per 2011 census:

Subdivision	Population (2011)	Hindu %	Muslim %	Christian %	Others %
Bangaon	1,063,028	85.63	13.73	0.26	0.38
Barasat Sadar	2,789,611	65.18	34.26	0.16	0.40
Barrackpore	3,668,653	88.61	10.32	0.35	0.71
Bidhannagar	216,609	95.26	2.56	0.45	1.73
Basirhat	2,271,880	51.37	48.37	0.14	0.13
North 24 Parganas district	10,009,781	73.45	25.82	0.24	0.48

North 24 Parganas district with 24.22% Muslims (in 2001) has been identified as a minority concentrated district by the Ministry of Minority Affairs, Government of India. A baseline survey on religious minority population has been carried out under the aegis of Indian Council of Social Science Research and funded by the Ministry of Minority Affairs. For information on the survey see North 24 Parganas: minority concentrated district.

== Population movement ==
North 24 Parganas district is densely populated, mainly because of the influx of refugees from East Pakistan (later Bangladesh). With a density of population of 2,182 per km^{2} in 1971, it was 3rd in terms of density per km^{2} in West Bengal after Kolkata and Howrah, and 20th in India. According to the District Human Development Report: North 24 Parganas, “High density is also explained partly by the rapid growth of urbanization in the district. In 1991, the percentage of urban population in the district has been 51.23.”

The census figures show the number of refugees from East Pakistan in 1971 was nearly 6 million and in 1981, the number was assessed at 8 million. A district-wise break-up in 1971, shows the main thrust of the refugee influx was on 24-Parganas (22.3% of the total refugees), Nadia (20.3%), Bankura (19.1%) and Kolkata (12.9%).

The North 24 Paraganas district has a 352 km long international border with Bangladesh, out of which 160 km is land border and 192 km is riverine border. Only a small portion of the border has been fenced and it is popularly referred to as a porous border. There are reports of Bangladeshi infiltrators. The CD Block pages carry Decadal Population Growth information.

An estimate in 2000 placed the total number of illegal Bangladeshi immigrants in India at 1.5 crore, with around 3 lakh entering every year. The thumb rule for such illegal immigrants is that for each illegal person caught four get through. While many immigrants have settled in the border areas, some have moved on, even to far way places such as Mumbai and Delhi. The border is guarded by the Border Security Force. During the UPA government, Sriprakash Jaiswal, Union Minister of State for Home Affairs, had made a statement in Parliament on 14 July 2004, that there were 12 million illegal Bangladeshi infiltrators living in India, and West Bengal topped the list with 5.7 million Bangladeshis. More recently, Kiren Rijiju, Minister of State for Home Affairs in the NDA government has put the figure at around 20 million.

== Administrative units ==
Bidhannagar subdivision consists of Bidhannagar Municipality, Mahishbathan II Gram Panchayat and Rajarhat-Gopalpur Municipality (subsequently merged to form Bidhannagar Municipal Corporation since 2015), including Nabadiganta Industrial Township (Bidhannagar Sector - V) and Rajarhat (Community development block).

== Police stations ==
The following police stations are under Bidhannagar Police Commissionerate:

Police station	Area covered (km^{2})	Jurisdiction
Bidhannagar (South)	n/a	Bidhannagar (South)
Bidhannagar (East)	n/a	Bidhannagar (East)
Bidhannagar (North)	n/a	Bidhannagar (North)
Electronic Complex	n/a	Bidhannagar Sector - V
Lake Town	n/a	Lake Town (part of Barrackpore subdivision)
Baguiati	n/a	Baguiati (part of Rajarhat-Gopalpur)
Airport	n/a	Dum Dum Airport-Rajarhat-Gopalpur (also serves some areas in Barasat Sadar subdivision and Barrackpore subdivision)
Netaji Subhas Chandra Bose International Airport	n/a	Inside of Dum Dum Airport
New Town	n/a	New Town
Narayanpur	n/a	Narayanpur
Rajarhat	n/a	Rajarhat (Community development block)
Cyber Crime	n/a	n/a
Women PS (Bidhannagar)	n/a	n/a

== Municipal towns/ cities ==
An overview of the two municipal cities in Bidhanagar subdivision is given below. The data provided here is that of a period prior to the formation of Bidhannagar Municipal Corporation, and, as such, would require updating as and when such information is available.

Municipal town/city	Area (km^{2})	Population (2011)	Hindus %	Muslims %	Slum population %	BPL Households % (2006)	Literacy% (2001)
Bidhannagar	33.50	215,514	95.29	2.54	29.30	8.80	84.68
Rajarhat-Gopalpur^{1}	34.97	402,844	84.13	14.91	9.13	15.51	84.31

Note 1: Bidhannagar Municipal Corporation was formed in 2015 and Rajarhat-Gopalpur Municipality has been part of it and also transferred to Bidhannagar subdivision.

== Blocks ==

Community development block in Bidhannagar subdivision is:

CD Block	Headquarters	Area km^{2}	Population (2011)	SC %	ST %	Hindus %	Muslims %	Literacy rate %	Census Towns
Rajarhat^{1}	Rajarhat	72.90	189,893	35.05	0.62	59.41	39.90	83.13	9

Note 1: In 2015, Rajarhat (community development block) was transferred to Bidhannagar subdivision.

== Gram panchayats ==
The subdivision contains 6 gram panchayats under 1 community development block:

- Gram panchayats in Rajarhat CD Block^{1} are: Chandpur, Mahisbathan–II, Rajarhat Bishnupur–I, Jangrahatiara–II, Patharghata and Rajarhat Bishnupur–II.

Note 1: In 2015, this CD Block was completely transferred to Bidhannagar subdivision.

== Education ==
North 24 Parganas district had a literacy rate of 84.06% (for population of 7 years and above) as per the census of India 2011. Bangaon subdivision had a literacy rate of 80.57%, Barasat Sadar subdivision 84.90%, Barrackpur subdivision 89.09%, Bidhannagar subdivision 89.16% and Basirhat subdivision 75.67%.

Given in the table below (data in numbers) is a comprehensive picture of the education scenario in North 24 Parganas district for the year 2012-13:

Subdivision	Primary School		Middle School		High School		Higher Secondary School		General College, Univ		Technical / Professional Instt		Non-formal Education	
Subdivision	Institution	Student	Institution	Student	Institution	Student	Institution	Student	Institution	Student	Institution	Student	Institution	Student
Bangaon	533	54,361	1	36	31	14,654	83	107,745	4	11,031	1	95	1,594	54,016
Barasat Sadar	920	120,670	19	2,734	93	63,707	171	246,098	14	40,466	23	6,190	2,887	130,522
Barrackpore	948	126,453	29	5,716	193	165,924	205	215,713	25	44,818	20	6,345	2,483	160,236
Bidhannagar	20	12,317	-	-	1	900	17	22,536	1	865	15	5,432	1	552
Basirhat	1,256	139,737	25	10,165	124	101,536	118	105,724	5	15,248	-	-	3,800	164,833
North 24 Parganas district	3,677	453,538	74	18,651	442	346,721	594	697,816	49	112,428	59	18,062	10,765	439,560

Note: Primary schools include junior basic schools; middle schools, high schools and higher secondary schools include madrasahs; technical schools include junior technical schools, junior government polytechnics, industrial technical institutes, industrial training centres, nursing training institutes etc.; technical and professional colleges include engineering colleges, medical colleges, para-medical institutes, management colleges, teachers training and nursing training colleges, law colleges, art colleges, music colleges etc. Special and non-formal education centres include sishu siksha kendras, madhyamik siksha kendras, centres of Rabindra mukta vidyalaya, recognised Sanskrit tols, institutions for the blind and other handicapped persons, Anganwadi centres, reformatory schools etc.

The following institutions are located in Bidhannagar subdivision:

- West Bengal National University of Juridical Sciences was established in 1999.
- Government College of Engineering and Leather Technology was established as Calcutta Research Tannery in 1919 and in 1955 started offering B.Sc. (Tech.) course in Leather Technology. Subsequently, it added other engineering courses.
- Bidhannagar College was established in 1984.
- Techno India, a private engineering college, was established in 2001.
- Derozio Memorial College^{1} was established at Rajarhat in 1996.
- St. Xavier's University, Kolkata^{1}, a private Jesuit university, was established at New Town, Kolkata in January 2017.
- University of Engineering & Management (UEM), Kolkata^{1}, a private university, was established at New Town, Kolkata in 2015.
- Amity University, Kolkata^{1}, a private university, was established at New Town, Kolkata in 2015.
- Aliah University^{1} was initially founded as Mohammedan College in 1880 and was elevated as a university in 2008. The main campus of the university is located at New Town, Kolkata.
- B. P. Poddar Institute of Management & Technology^{1} was established at Kaikhali near Netaji Subhas Chandra Bose International Airport in 1999.

Note 1: Bidhannagar Municipal Corporation was formed in 2015 and Rajarhat-Gopalpur Municipality has been part of it and also transferred to Bidhannagar subdivision. Hence all the educational institutions in Rajarhat-Gopalpur Municipality are added hereby.

== Healthcare ==
The table below (all data in numbers) presents an overview of the medical facilities available and patients treated in the hospitals, health centres and sub-centres in 2013 in North 24 Parganas district.

Subdivision	Health & Family Welfare Deptt, WB				Other State Govt Deptts**	Local bodies**	Central Govt Deptts / PSUs**	NGO / Private Nursing Homes**	Total	Total Number of Beds	Total Number of Doctors*	Indoor Patients	Outdoor Patients
Subdivision	Hospitals	Rural Hospitals	Block Primary Health Centres	Primary Health Centres	Other State Govt Deptts**	Local bodies**	Central Govt Deptts / PSUs**	NGO / Private Nursing Homes**	Total	Total Number of Beds	Total Number of Doctors*	Indoor Patients	Outdoor Patients
Bangaon	1	1	2	10	-	-	-	-	14	417	24	11,587	650,349
Barasat Sadar	3	1	6	15	-	-	-	-	25	1,084	45	125,000	1,397,574
Barrackpore	7	-	2	2	-	-	-	-	11	1,081	8	94,042	1,010,820
Bidhannagar	1	-	-	-	-	-	-	`	1	100	-	6,567	117,136
Basirhat	1	5	5	23	-	-	-	-	34	703	77	69,034	897,725
North 24 Parganas district	13	7	15	50	6	27	3	233	354	3,385	154	306,230	4,073,604

.* Excluding nursing homes.
** Subdivision-wise break up for certain items not available.

Medical facilities available in Bidhannagar subdivision are as follows:

Hospitals: (Name, location, beds)
Salt Lake Subdivisional Hospital, Bidhannagar, 100 beds.

Vidyasagar Matri Sadan, Rajarhat, 20 beds^{1}.

Jyangra CH Care Hospital, Baguiati^{1}.

Private Medical Facilities (Name, location, details) Apollo Gleneagles Hospital, 58, Canal Circular Road, on EM Byepass, multi speciality hospital with 510 beds.

- AMRI Hospitals, JC 16&17 Salt Lake City, multi speciality hospital with 210 beds.
- Columbia Asia Hospitals, IB 193, Sector 3, near Sech Bhawan, Salt Lake City, multi speciality hospital with 100 beds.
  ILS Hospital, DD 6, Salt Lake City, multi speciality hospital.

Note 1: Bidhannagar Municipal Corporation was formed in 2015 and Rajarhat-Gopalpur Municipality has been part of it and also transferred to Bidhannagar subdivision. Hence all the hospitals in Rajarhat-Gopalpur Municipality are added hereby.

== Electoral constituencies ==
Lok Sabha (parliamentary) and Vidhan Sabha (state assembly) constituencies in Bidhannagar subdivision were as follows:

Lok Sabha constituency	Reservation	Vidhan Sabha constituency	Reservation	CD Block and/or Gram panchayats and/or municipal areas
Barasat	None	Bidhannagar	None	Bidhannagar municipality (now Ward Nos. 28 to 41 of Bidhannagar Municipal Corporation) and Ward Nos. 19, 20 and 28-35 of South Dum Dum municipality
		Rajarhat New Town^{1}	None	Ward Nos. 1–5,12-14,20-21 of Bidhannagar Municipal Corporation (Before 2015 Rajarhat-Gopalpur Municipality) and Ward 27 of Bidhannagar Municipal Corporation(formerly Mahisbathan–II gram panchayat of Rajarhat CD Block) and remaining Rajarhat CD Block.
		Other assembly segments outside Bidhannagar subdivision		
Dum Dum	None	Rajrahat Gopalpur^{1}	None	Rajarhat-Gopalpur Municipality (now Ward Nos. 7-9 and 14-26 of Bidhannagar Municipal Corporation) and Ward Nos.18 and 21-27 of South Dum Dum municipality
		Other assembly segments outside Bidhannagar subdivision		

Note 1: In 2015, these Vidhan Sabha Constituencies were transferred to Bidhannagar subdivision.
