= Rajarhat New Town Assembly constituency =

Rajarhat New Town
- Constituency No. 115 for the West Bengal Legislative Assembly
- Interactive Map Outlining Rajarhat New Town Assembly Constituency

Constituency details
- Country: India
- Region: East India
- State: West Bengal
- District: North 24 Parganas
- Lok Sabha constituency: Barasat
- Established: 1962
- Total electors: 2,52,588
- Reservation: None

Member of Legislative Assembly
- 18th West Bengal Legislative Assembly
- Incumbent Piyush Kanodia
- Party: BJP
- Elected year: 2026
- Preceded by: Tapash Chatterjee

Rajarhat New Town Assembly constituency is a Legislative Assembly constituency of North 24 Parganas district in the Indian state of West Bengal.

Most Successful parties from Rajarhat-Newtown assembly
1. Communist Party of India (Marxist) (8 times) (50.0%)
2. All India Trinamool Congress (4 time) (25.0%)
3. Indian National Congress (2 times) (12.5%)
4. Communist Party of India (1 time) (6.25%)
5. Bharatiya Janata Party (1 time) (6.25%)

== Overview ==
As per orders of the Delimitation Commission, No. 115 Rajarhat New Town Assembly constituency is composed of the following: Ward Nos. 1–5,12-14,20-21 of Bidhannagar Municipal Corporation (Before 2015 Wards 1-6 & 10-13 of Rajarhat-Gopalpur Municipality) and Ward 27 of Bidhannagar Municipal Corporation(formerly Mahisbathan–II gram panchayat of Rajarhat CD Block) and remaining Rajarhat CD Block

Rajarhat New Town Assembly constituency is part of No. 17 Barasat (Lok Sabha constituency). Rajarhat (SC) was part of Dum Dum (Lok Sabha constituency).

== Members of the Legislative Assembly ==
Year	Name	Party
Rajarhat
1962	Pranab Prasad Roy	Communist Party of India
1967	S.N. Das	Communist Party of India (Marxist)
1969	Rabindranath Mondal	Communist Party of India (Marxist)
1971	Khagendranath Mondal	Indian National Congress
1972	Khagendranath Mondal	Indian National Congress
1977	Rabindranath Mondal	Communist Party of India (Marxist)
1982	Rabindranath Mondal	Communist Party of India (Marxist)
1987	Rabindranath Mondal	Communist Party of India (Marxist)
1991	Rabindranath Mondal	Communist Party of India (Marxist)
1996	Rabindranath Mondal	Communist Party of India (Marxist)
2001	Tanmoy Mondal	Trinamool Congress
2006	Rabindranath Mondal	Communist Party of India (Marxist)
Rajarhat New Town
2011	Sabyasachi Dutta	Trinamool Congress
2016	Sabyasachi Dutta	Trinamool Congress
2021	Tapash Chatterjee	Trinamool Congress
2026	Piyush Kanodia	Bharatiya Janata Party

== Election results ==
=== 2026 ===
2026 West Bengal Legislative Assembly election: Rajarhat New Town
Party	Candidate	Votes	%	±%
BJP	Piyush Kanodia	106,564	42.19	▲11.99
AITC	Tapash Chatterjee	106,248	42.07	▼12.15
CPI(M)	Saptarshi Deb	32,246	12.77	▼0.66
NOTA	None of the above	1,792	0.71	▼0.16
Majority		316	0.12	▼23.9
Turnout		252,560	94.34	▲13.08
BJP gain from AITC		Swing		

=== 2021 ===
2021 West Bengal Legislative Assembly election: Rajarhat New Town
Party	Candidate	Votes	%	±%
AITC	Tapash Chatterjee	127,374	54.22	▲8.62
BJP	Bhaskar Roy	70,942	30.2	▲23.22
CPI(M)	Saptarshi Deb	31,543	13.43	▼27.53
NOTA	None of the above	2,032	0.87	
Majority		56,432	24.02	
Turnout		234,906	81.26	
AITC hold		Swing		

=== 2016 ===
2016 West Bengal Legislative Assembly election: Rajarhat New Town
Party	Candidate	Votes	%	±%
AITC	Sabyasachi Dutta	90,671	45.58	▼3.65
CPI(M)	Narendranath Chatterjee	81,478	40.96	▼3.54
BJP	Nupur Ghosh	17,877	8.98	▲6.65
WPOI	Sheikh Md. Salim	3,087	1.55	
BSP	Bhaskar Roy	1,998	1.00	
Independent	Samir Sardar	1,447	0.72	
NOTA	None of the above	2,332	1.17	
Majority		8,923	4.62	▼0.11
Turnout		198,890	84.29	▼4.95
AITC hold		Swing	-0.06	

=== 2011 ===
In the 2011 election, Sabyasachi Dutta of Trinamool Congress defeated his nearest rival Tapash Chatterjee of CPI(M).

West Bengal assembly elections, 2011: Rajarhat New Town constituency
Party	Candidate	Votes	%	±%
AITC	Sabyasachi Dutta	80,738	49.23	+1.83#
CPI(M)	Tapash Chatterjee	72,991	44.50	−5.76
BJP	Priyalal Dutta	3,827	2.33	
IUML	Md. Salim Makkar	1,474		
Independent	Tapan Kumar Paul	1,159		
Independent	Himangsu Mallick	1,093		
Independent	Gopal Chakraborty	881		
BSP	Basudeb Naskar	834		
Majority		7,747	4.72	
Turnout		164,000	89.24	
AITC win (new seat)				

.# Swing calculated on Congress+Trinamool Congress vote percentages taken together in 2006.

=== 2006 ===
In the 2006 state assembly elections, Rabindranath Mondal of CPI(M) won the Rajarhat (SC) assembly seat defeating Tanmoy Mondal of Trinamool Congress. Contests in most years were multi cornered but only winners and runners are being mentioned. In 2001 Tanmoy Mondal of Trinamool Congress defeated Rabindranath Mondal of CPI(M). Prior to that Rabindranath Mondal had won the seat five times in a row defeating Tanmoy Mondal representing Congress in 1996, Sukumar Roy of Congress in 1991, Biswananda Naskar of Congress in 1987, Tanmoy Mondal of Congress in 1982 and Amalendu Sekhar Naskar of Congress in 1977.

=== 1972 ===
Khagendranath Mondal of Congress won in 1972 and 1971. Rabindranath Mondal of CPI(M) won in 1969. S.N.Das of CPI(M) won in 1967. Pranab Prasad Roy of CPI won in 1962. Prior to that the Rajarhat seat was not there.
