= Rajarhat =

- Neighbourhood
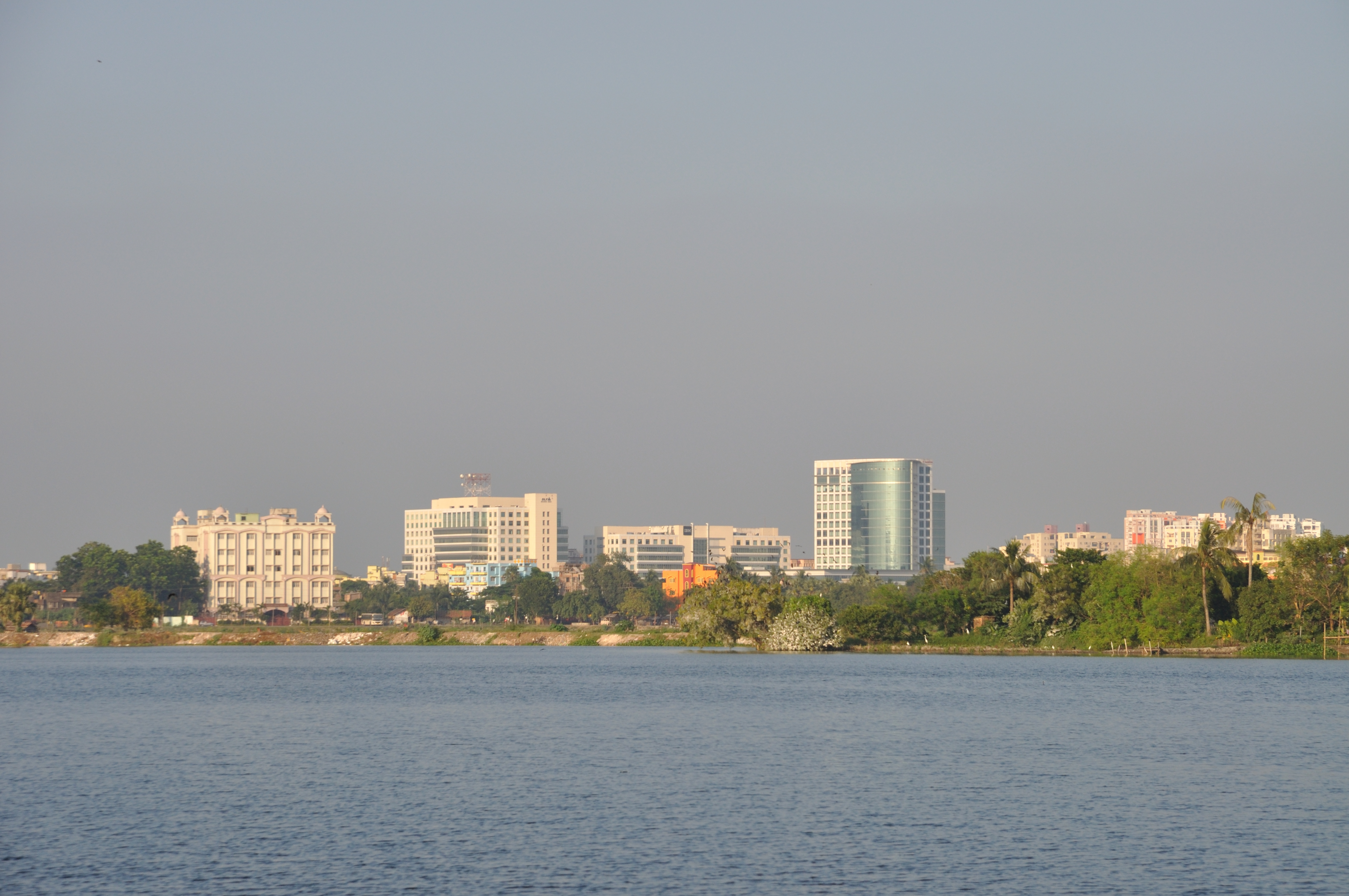
- Skyline of Rajarhat

- Location in West Bengal, India Rajarhat (West Bengal) Rajarhat (India)
- Coordinates: 22.6236°N 88.4410°E
- Country: India
- State: West Bengal
- Division: Presidency
- District: North 24 Parganas

Government
  - Type: Municipal Corporation
  - Body: Bidhannagar Municipal Corporation

Area
  - Total: 34.97 km^{2} (13.50 sq mi)

Population (2011)
  - Total: 402,844
  - Density: 11,520/km^{2} (29,840/sq mi)

Languages
  - Official: Bengali, English
- Time zone: UTC+5:30 (IST)
- PIN: 700052, 700059, 700101, 700102, 700135, 700136, 700157, 700159
- Telephone code: +91 33
- Vehicle registration: WB
- Lok Sabha constituency: Dum Dum, Barasat
- Vidhan Sabha constituency: Rajarhat Gopalpur, Rajarhat New Town
- Website: bmcwbgov.in

Rajarhat is a neighbourhood in Bidhannagar Municipal Corporation of North 24 Parganas district in the Indian state of West Bengal. It is a part of the area covered by Kolkata Metropolitan Development Authority (KMDA). Rajarhat was conceptualised in the 1990s, designed and developed in the 2000s and 2010s by the state government of West Bengal, and came to become a major IT hub through the 2010s.

== Administration ==
The Bidhannagar Municipal Corporation consists of 41 wards. It consists of many localities such as: Kestopur, Baguiati, Teghoria, Kaikhali, Rajarhat, Gopalpur and a part of NSCBI Airport. On 18 June 2015, Bidhannagar Municipal Corporation (BMC) was constituted by merging the existing municipal areas of Rajarhat-Gopalpur Municipality, Bidhannagar Municipality and the panchayat area of Mahishbathan II Gram Panchayat. Now Rajarhat-Gopalpur has 26 wards (ward no. 1 to 26) under Bidhannagar Municipal Corporation.

The area is under the jurisdiction of the Bidhannagar Police Commissionerate.

== Demographics ==
Historical population
| Year | Pop. | ±% |
|---|---|---|
| 1961 | 4,712 | — |
| 1971 | 37,594 | +697.8% |
| 1981 | 85,945 | +128.6% |
| 1991 | 147,348 | +71.4% |
| 2001 | 271,811 | +84.5% |
| 2011 | 402,844 | +48.2% |
Source: Government of India

As per the 2011 census, Rajarhat-Gopalpur Municipality had a total population of 402,844 persons, Males constitute 50.55% of the population and females 49%. Rajarhat-Gopalpur has an average literacy rate of 89.69%.

=== Languages ===
Languages spoken in Rajarhat Gopalpur (2011)
1. Bengali (82.5%)
2. Hindi (14.8%)
3. Urdu (1.17%)
4. Odia (0.35%)
5. Marwari (0.18%)
6. Others (1.03%)

== See also ==
- Rajarhat Gopalpur (Vidhan Sabha constituency)
- Rajarhat New Town (Vidhan Sabha constituency)
- New Town, Kolkata
- Rajarhat (community development block)
