= Anarbaria =

- Census Town
- Location in West Bengal, India Anarbaria (India)
- Coordinates: 22.8154°N 88.6302°E
- Country: India
- State: West Bengal
- District: North 24 Parganas

Area
  - Total: 1.574 km^{2} (0.608 sq mi)

Population (2011)
  - Total: 5,895
  - Density: 3,745/km^{2} (9,700/sq mi)

Languages
  - Official: Bengali, English
- Time zone: UTC+5:30 (IST)
- PIN: 743263
- Telephone code: 03216
- Vehicle registration: WB
- Lok Sabha constituency: Barasat
- Vidhan Sabha constituency: Habra

Anarbaria is a census town in the Habra I CD block in the Barasat Sadar subdivision of the North 24 Parganas district in the state of West Bengal, India.

== Geography ==
Cities, towns and locations in Barasat subdivision, North 24 Parganas
M: municipal town, CT: census town, R: rural/ urban centre, H: historical centre
Owing to space constraints in the small map, the actual locations in a larger map may vary slightly

=== Location ===
Anarbaria is located at 22.8154°N 88.6302°E.

=== Area overview ===
The area covered in the map alongside is largely a part of the north Bidyadhari Plain. located in the lower Ganges Delta. The country is flat. It is a little raised above flood level and the highest ground borders the river channels. 54.67% of the people of the densely populated area lives in the urban areas and 45.33% lives in the rural areas.

Note: The map alongside presents some of the notable locations in the subdivision. All places marked in the map are linked in the larger full screen map.

== Demographics ==
According to the 2011 Census of India, Anarbaria had a total population of 5,895, of which 2,973 (50%) were males and 2,922 (50%) were females. Population in the age range 0–6 years was 582. The total number of literate persons in Anarbaria was 4,432 (83.42% of the population over 6 years).

As per the 2011 Census of India, Habra Urban Agglomeration had a total population of 304,584, of which 154,863 (51%) were males and 149,723 (49%) were females. Population below 6 years was 23,023. The total number of literates in Habra UA was 256,313 (91.03% of the population over 6 years). The constituents of Habra Urban Agglomeration were Habra (M), Ashoknagar Kalyangarh (M), Bara Bamonia (CT), Guma (CT), Anarbaria (CT) and Khorddabamonia (CT).

== Infrastructure ==
According to the District Census Handbook, North Twenty Four Parganas, 2011, Anarberia covered an area of 1.574 km^{2}. The protected water-supply involved hand pump, tank, pond, lake. It had 545 domestic electric connections. Among the medical facilities it had 1 medicine shop. Among the educational facilities, it had 2 primary schools, other schools at Prithiba 4 km away. The nearest college was 5 km away at Habra. It specialises in tailoring and pottery. It has the branch office of 1 nationalised bank.
