= Bara Bamonia =

- Census Town
- Location in West Bengal, India Bara Bamonia (India)
- Coordinates: 22.8138°N 88.6005°E
- Country: India
- State: West Bengal
- District: North 24 Parganas

Population (2011)
  - Total: 7,193

Languages
  - Official: Bengali, English
- Time zone: UTC+5:30 (IST)
- ISO 3166 code: IN-WB
- Vehicle registration: WB
- Lok Sabha constituency: Barasat
- Vidhan Sabha constituency: Ashoknagar
- Website: north24parganas.gov.in/n24p/index.php

Bara Bamonia is a census town in the Habra II CD block of Barasat Sadar subdivision in North 24 Parganas district in the state of West Bengal, India.

== Geography ==
Cities, towns and locations in Barasat subdivision, North 24 Parganas
M: municipal town, CT: census town, R: rural/ urban centre, H: historical centre
Owing to space constraints in the small map, the actual locations in a larger map may vary slightly

=== Location ===
Bara Bamonia is located at 22.8138°N 88.6005°E.

Bara Bamonia, Guma and Khorddabamonia form a cluster of census towns.

=== Area overview ===
The area covered in the map alongside is largely a part of the north Bidyadhari Plain. located in the lower Ganges Delta. The country is flat. It is a little raised above flood level and the highest ground borders the river channels. 54.67% of the people of the densely populated area lives in the urban areas and 45.33% lives in the rural areas.

Note: The map alongside presents some of the notable locations in the subdivision. All places marked in the map are linked in the larger full screen map.

== Demographics ==
According to the 2011 Census of India, Bara Bamonia had a total population of 7,193, of which 3,683 (51%) were males and 3,510 (49%) were females. Population in the age range 0–6 years was 756. The total number of literate persons in Bara Bamonia was 5,745 (89.25% of the population over 6 years).

According to the 2011 Census of India, Habra Urban Agglomeration had a total population of 304,584, of which 154,863 (51%) were males and 149,723 (49%) were females. Population in the age range 0–6 years was 23,023. The total number of literate persons in Habra UA was 256,313 (91.03% of the population over 6 years). The constituents of Habra Urban Agglomeration were Habra (M), Ashoknagar Kalyangarh (M), Bara Bamonia (CT), Guma (CT), Anarbaria (CT) and Khorddabamonia (CT).

As of 2001 India census, Bara Bamonia had a population of 6174. Males constitute 51% of the population and females 49%. Bara Bamonia has an average literacy rate of 73%, higher than the national average of 59.5%; with 55% of the literates being male and 45% being female. 13% of the population is under 6 years of age.

== Infrastructure ==
As per District Census Handbook 2011, Bara Bamonia covered an area of 0.76 km^{2}. It had 6 primary schools, 2 middle schools, 2 secondary schools and 1 senior secondary school, and the nearest degree college was 10 km away at Habra. The nearest hospital was 7 km away, the nearest dispensary/health centre was 1 km away, the nearest family welfare centre was 4 km away, the nearest maternity and child welfare centre was 7 km away and the nearest maternity home was 7 km away.

== Transport ==
Bara Bamonia is on National Highway 112 (old numbering NH 35).

Guma railway station, located nearby at Guma, on the Sealdah-Bangaon branch line, is 37.3 km from Sealdah and is part of the Kolkata Suburban Railway system.

== Healthcare ==
North 24 Parganas district has been identified as one of the areas where ground water is affected by arsenic contamination.

== See also ==
Map of Habra II CD Block on Page 313 of District Census Handbook.
