= Sabdalpur =

- Village
- Location in West Bengal, India Sabdalpur (India)
- Coordinates: 22.844417°N 88.568235°E
- Country: India
- State: West Bengal
- District: North 24 Parganas

Population (2011)
  - Total: 3,049

Languages
  - Official: Bengali, English
- Time zone: UTC+5:30 (IST)
- PIN: 743234
- Telephone/STD code: 03216
- Lok Sabha constituency: Barasat
- Vidhan Sabha constituency: Ashoknagar
- Website: north24parganas.nic.in

Sabdalpur is a village in the Habra II CD block in the Barasat Sadar subdivision of the North 24 Parganas district in the state of West Bengal, India.

== Geography ==
Cities, towns and locations in Barasat subdivision, North 24 Parganas
M: municipal town, CT: census town, R: rural/ urban centre, H: historical centre
Owing to space constraints in the small map, the actual locations in a larger map may vary slightly

=== Location ===
Sabdalpur is located at 22.844417°N 88.568235°E.

Ashoknagar police station has jurisdiction over Habra II CD Block.

=== Area overview ===
The area covered in the map alongside is largely a part of the north Bidyadhari Plain. located in the lower Ganges Delta. The country is flat. It is a little raised above flood level and the highest ground borders the river channels. 54.67% of the people of the densely populated area lives in the urban areas and 45.33% lives in the rural areas.

Note: The map alongside presents some of the notable locations in the subdivision. All places marked in the map are linked in the larger full screen map.

== Demographics ==
According to the 2011 Census of India, Sabdalpur had a total population of 3,049, of which 1,498 (49%) were males and 1,551 (51%) were females. Population in the age range 0–6 years was 306. The total number of literate persons in Sabdalpur was 2,116 (77.14% of the population over 6 years).

== Transport ==
Sabdalpur is on the Iswarigachha-Sahara Road.

== Healthcare ==
Sabdalpur Rural Hospital with 30 beds functions as the main medical facility in Habra II CD Block. There are primary health centres at Bira Ballabhpur (Pukurkona PHC with 10 beds) and Sendanga (Pumlia PHC with 6 beds).
