= Bira, North 24 Parganas =

Bira
- Village
- Location in West Bengal, India Bira (India)
- Coordinates: 22.7844°N 88.5734°E
- Country: India
- State: West Bengal
- District: North 24 Parganas

Area
  - Total: 3.9142 km^{2} (1.5113 sq mi)

Population (2011)
  - Total: 10,741
  - Density: 2,744.1/km^{2} (7,107.2/sq mi)

Languages
  - Official: Bengali, English
- Time zone: UTC+5:30 (IST)
- PIN: 743234
- Telephone code: 03216
- Vehicle registration: WB
- Lok Sabha constituency: Barasat
- Vidhan Sabha constituency: Habra

Bira is a Village in the Habra II CD block in the Barasat Sadar subdivision of the North 24 Parganas district in the state of West Bengal, India.

== Geography ==
Cities, towns and locations in Barasat subdivision, North 24 Parganas
M: municipal town, CT: census town, R: rural/ urban centre, H: historical centre
Owing to space constraints in the small map, the actual locations in a larger map may vary slightly

=== Location ===
Bira is located at 22.7844°N 88.5734°E.

=== Area overview ===
The area covered in the map alongside is largely a part of the north Bidyadhari Plain. located in the lower Ganges Delta. The country is flat. It is a little raised above flood level and the highest ground borders the river channels.54.67% of the people of the densely populated area lives in the urban areas and 45.33% lives in the rural areas.

Note: The map alongside presents some of the notable locations in the subdivision. All places marked in the map are linked in the larger full screen map.

== Demographics ==
According to the 2011 Census of India, Bira had a total population of 10,741, of which 5,471 (51%) were males and 5,270 (49%) were females. Population in the age range 0-6 years was 1,095. The total number of literate persons in Bira was 8,361 (86.68% of the population over 6 years).

== Infrastructure ==
According to the District Census Handbook, North Twenty Four Parganas, 2011, Bira covered an area of 3.9142 km^{2}. It had 1.5 kmroads with open drains. The protected water-supply involved hand pumps. It had 2,175 domestic electric connections, 50 road-light points. Among the educational facilities, it had 3 primary schools, 2 middle schools, 2 secondary schools, 2 higher secondary schools. The nearest college was 10 km away at Habra. It is well-known for its embroidery work, bags, trunks. It has the branch office of 1 nationalised bank.
