= Betpuli =

- Census Town
- Location in West Bengal, India Betpuli (India)
- Coordinates: 22.8477°N 88.7484°E
- Country: India
- State: West Bengal
- District: North 24 Parganas

Area
  - Total: 2.0106 km^{2} (0.7763 sq mi)

Population (2011)
  - Total: 9,404
  - Density: 4,677/km^{2} (12,110/sq mi)

Languages
  - Official: Bengali, English
- Time zone: UTC+5:30 (IST)
- PIN: 743263
- Telephone code: 03216
- Vehicle registration: WB
- Lok Sabha constituency: Barasat
- Vidhan Sabha constituency: Habra

Betpuli is a census town in the Habra I CD block in the Barasat Sadar subdivision of the North 24 Parganas district in the state of West Bengal, India.

== Geography ==
Cities, towns and locations in Barasat subdivision, North 24 Parganas
M: municipal town, CT: census town, R: rural/ urban centre, H: historical centre
Owing to space constraints in the small map, the actual locations in a larger map may vary slightly

=== Location ===
Betpuli is located at 22.8477°N 88.7484°E.

=== Area overview ===
The area covered in the map alongside is largely a part of the north Bidyadhari Plain. located in the lower Ganges Delta. The country is flat. It is a little raised above flood level and the highest ground borders the river channels. 54.67% of the people of the densely populated area lives in the urban areas and 45.33% lives in the rural areas.

Note: The map alongside presents some of the notable locations in the subdivision. All places marked in the map are linked in the larger full screen map.

== Demographics ==
According to the 2011 Census of India, Betpuli had a total population of 9,404, of which 4,777 (51%) were males and 4,627 (49%) were females. Population in the age range 0–6 years was 833. The total number of literate persons in Betpuli was 7,561 (88.31% of the population over 6 years).

== Infrastructure ==
According to the District Census Handbook, North Twenty Four Parganas, 2011, Betpuli covered an area of 2.0106 km^{2}. The protected water-supply involved hand pump, tank, pond, lake. It had 964 domestic electric connections. Among the educational facilities, it had 2 primary schools, other schools at Rajballavpur 3 km away. The nearest college was 13 km away at Habra. It specialises in tailoring.
