= Gumma =

Gumma or Guma may refer to:

Places

- Guma, Pishan County, seat and subdivision of Guma (Pishan) County, Xinjiang, China
- Guma County, subdivision of Hotan Prefecture, Xinjiang, China
- Guma, Luanzhou, a town in Hebei, China
- Guma (woreda), one of the Districts of Ethiopia in the Oromia region
- The Kingdom of Gumma (also spelled Guma), a former kingdom in the Gibe region of Ethiopia
- Guma, Abkhazia, Georgia
- Guma, India, West Bengal
  - Guma railway station, West Bengal, India
- Gumma, Gajapati, Odisha, India
- Gumma, an alternative spelling of Gunma Prefecture in Japan
- Guma, Nigeria, a Local Government Area of Benue State

Other uses

- Gumma (pathology), a characteristic tissue nodule found in the tertiary stage of syphilis
- Guma, a type of Indonesian parang.
