= Mahisha Machhlandapur =

- Village
- Location in West Bengal, India Mahisha Machhlandapur (India)
- Coordinates: 22°50′0″N 88°38′0″E
- Country: India
- State: West Bengal
- District: North 24 Parganas

Population (2011)
  - Total: 6,488

Languages
  - Official: Bengali, English
- Time zone: UTC+5:30 (IST)
- PIN: 743271 (Mahisha Machhlandapur)
- Telephone/STD code: 03216
- Lok Sabha constituency: Barasat
- Vidhan Sabha constituency: Habra
- Website: north24parganas.nic.in

Mahisha Machhlandapur is a village of the Habra I CD block in the Barasat Sadar subdivision of the North 24 Parganas district in the state of West Bengal, India.

== Demographics ==
According to the 2011 Census of India, Mahisha Machhlandapur had a total population of 6,488, of which 3,373 were males and 3,115 were females.

== See also ==
- Habra
- Habra I
- Habra railway station
