= Purbba Narayanpur =

- Census Town
- Location in West Bengal, India Purbba Narayanpur (India)
- Coordinates: 22.7974°N 88.5834°E
- Country: India
- State: West Bengal
- District: North 24 Parganas

Area
  - Total: 2.4665 km^{2} (0.9523 sq mi)

Population (2011)
  - Total: 7,950
  - Density: 3,220/km^{2} (8,350/sq mi)

Languages
  - Official: Bengali, English
- Time zone: UTC+5:30 (IST)
- PIN: 743234
- Telephone code: 03216
- Vehicle registration: WB
- Lok Sabha constituency: Barasat
- Vidhan Sabha constituency: Habra

Purba Narayanpur is a census town in the Habra I CD block in the Barasat Sadar subdivision of the North 24 Parganas district in the state of West Bengal, India.

== Geography ==
Cities, towns and locations in Barasat subdivision, North 24 Parganas
M: municipal town, CT: census town, R: rural/ urban centre, H: historical centre
Owing to space constraints in the small map, the actual locations in a larger map may vary slightly

=== Location ===
Purbba Narayanpur is located at 22.7974°N 88.5834°E.

=== Area overview ===
The area covered in the map alongside is largely a part of the north Bidyadhari Plain. located in the lower Ganges Delta. The country is flat. It is a little raised above flood level and the highest ground borders the river channels. 54.67% of the people of the densely populated area lives in the urban areas and 45.33% lives in the rural areas.

Note: The map alongside presents some of the notable locations in the subdivision. All places marked in the map are linked in the larger full screen map.

== Demographics ==
According to the 2011 Census of India, Purbba Narayanpur had a total population of 7,950, of which 4,047 (51%) were males and 3,903 (49%) were females. Population in the age range 0–6 years was 767. The total number of literate persons in Purbba Narayanpur was 6,212 (86.48% of the population over 6 years).

== Infrastructure ==
According to the District Census Handbook, North Twenty Four Parganas, 2011, Purbba Narayanpur covered an area of 2.4665 km^{2}. The protected water-supply involved hand pump, tank, pond, lake. It had 777 domestic electric connections. Among the medical facilities it had 1 mobile health clinic and 6 medicine shops. Among the educational facilities, it had 3 primary schools, 1 middle school, 1 secondary school, 1 senior secondary school. The nearest college was 12 km away at Habra. There is a Higher Secondary School in the village. The school was set up in 1919 by Late Khan Bahadur Maula Box, a great educationist in the British era.. The school had a great impact in spreading education in the vicinity. Abdur Rashid Molla, the retired Headmaster of the school played a pivotal role in making the school a great source of knowledge and inspiration. The name of the village is regarded as one of the most educated villages in the district.The Sealdah-Bongaon railway track passes through the village. There is an ancient

Eidgah named as 'Badartala', where the people of the village and the surrounding areas gather for Eid prayers. The village is a peaceful one and people of different religions live in peace and harmony.
