= Narayan Goswami =

Indian politician (born 1970)

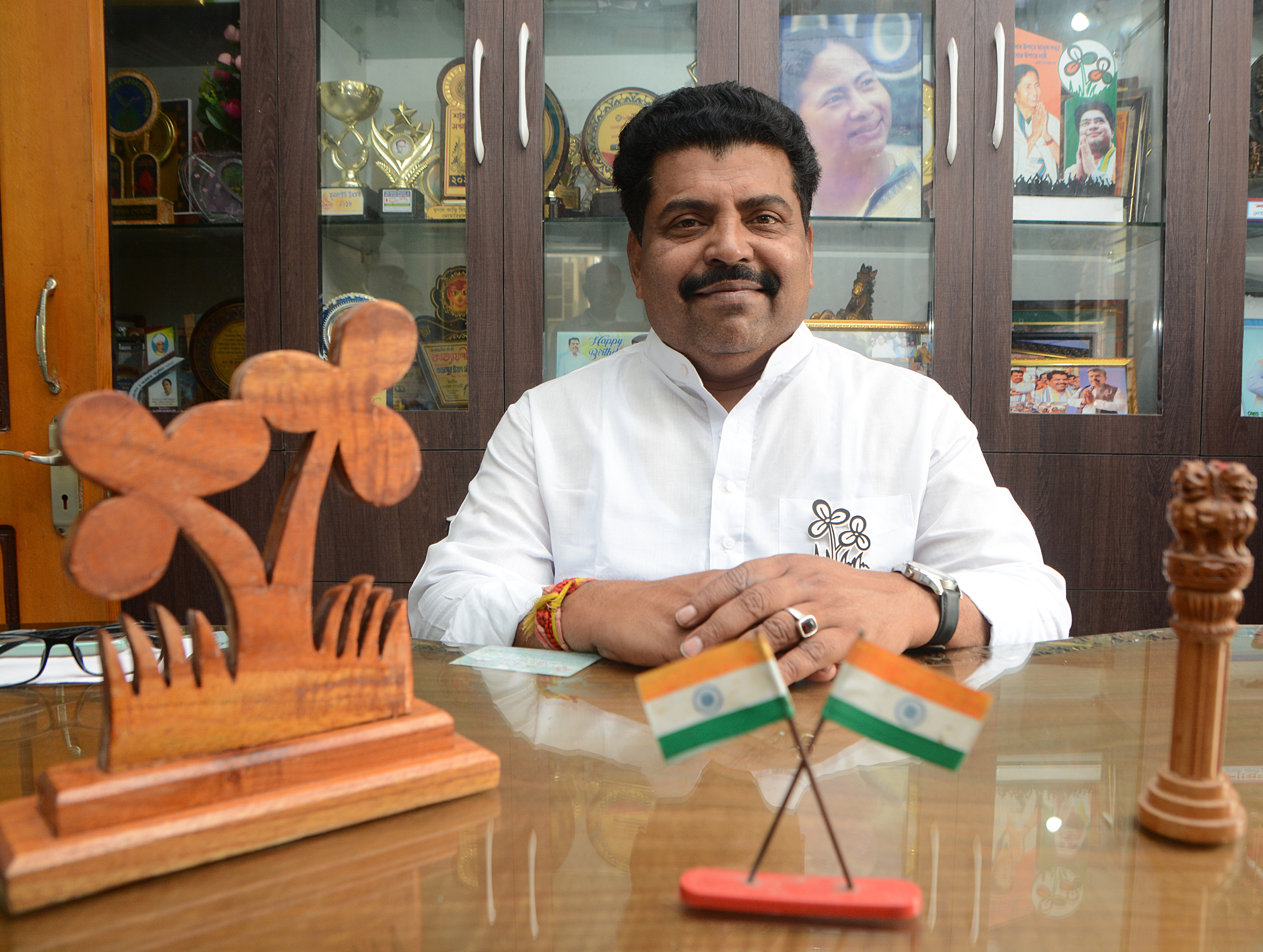

Member of the West Bengal Legislative Assembly
- In office 2 May 2021 – 5 May 2026
- Chief minister: Mamata Banerjee
- Preceded by: Dhiman Roy
- Succeeded by: Sumay Hira
- Constituency: Ashoknagar

Personal details
- Born: 9 September 1970 (age 56) Swarupnagar, North 24 Parganas
- Party: All India Trinamool Congress (1999–present)
- Education: University of Calcutta

Narayan Goswami (born 9 September 1970) is an Indian politician from the state of West Bengal. He is newly elected member of the West Bengal Legislative Assembly, elected from the Ashoknagar (Vidhan Sabha constituency) in the 2021 West Bengal Legislative Assembly election.

== Political party ==
He is from the All India Trinamool Congress.

== Constituency ==
He represents the Ashoknagar (Vidhan Sabha constituency).
