= Habra II =

- Community development block
- Interactive map of Habra II
- Coordinates: 22.83°N 88.63°E
- Country: India
- State: West Bengal
- District: North 24 Parganas

Government
  - Type: Representative democracy

Area
  - Total: 143.30 km^{2} (55.33 sq mi)
- Elevation: 14 m (46 ft)

Population (2011)
  - Total: 176,490
  - Density: 1,231.6/km^{2} (3,189.9/sq mi)

Languages
  - Official: Bengali, English

Literacy (2011)
  - Total literates: 127,039 (81.05%)
- Time zone: UTC+5:30 (IST)
- PIN: 743234 (Bira Ballavepara)
- Telephone/STD code: 03216
- ISO 3166 code: IN-WB
- Vehicle registration: WB-23, WB-24, WB-25, WB-26
- Lok Sabha constituency: Barasat
- Vidhan Sabha constituency: Ashoknagar
- Website: north24parganas.nic.in

Habra II is a community development block that forms an administrative division in Barasat Sadar subdivision of North 24 Parganas district in the Indian state of West Bengal.

== Geography ==
Guma, a census town in Habra II block, is located at 22°50′N 88°38′E.

Habra II CD Block is bounded by Haringhata CD Block in Nadia district in the north, Habra I CD Block in the east, Barasat I CD Block in the south and Amdanga CD Block in the west.

Gram panchayats of Habra lI block/ panchayat samiti are: Banspole, Bhurkunda, Guma I, Rajibpur Bira, Beraberi, Dighara Malikberia, Guma II and Srikrishnapur.

Habra II CD Block is part of the North Hooghly Flat, one of the three physiographic regions in the district located in the lower Ganges Delta. It is a raised alluvium area along the Hooghly, which forms the western boundary of the district.

Habra II CD Block has an area of 112.67 km^{2}. It has 1 panchayat samity, 8 gram panchayats, 106 gram sansads (village councils), 78 mouzas and 78 inhabited villages. Ashoknagar police station serves this block. Headquarters of this CD Block is at Guma.

== Demographics ==
=== Population ===
As per 2011 Census of India Habra II CD Block had a total population of 176,490, of which 140,675 were rural and 35,185 were urban. There were 90,466 (51%) males and 86,024 (49%) females. Population below 6 years was 19,756. Scheduled Castes numbered 31,665 (17.94%) and Scheduled Tribes numbered 4,075 (2.31%).

As per 2001 census, Habra II block has a total population of 149,803 out of which 77,014 were males and 72,709 were females. Population of the rural areas in the block was 134,322 and that of the urban areas was 15,471.

Census towns in Habra II CD Block were (2011 census figures in brackets): Guma (12,025), Bara Bamonia (7,193), Khorddabamonia (5,856) and Bira (10,741).

Large villages in Habra II CD Block were (2011 census figures in brackets): Dighra (4,257) and Tajpur (4,092).

North 24 Parganas district is densely populated, mainly because of the influx of refugees from East Pakistan (later Bangladesh). With a density of population of 2,182 per km^{2} in 1971, it was 3rd in terms of density per km^{2} in West Bengal after Kolkata and Howrah, and 20th in India. According to the District Human Development Report: North 24 Parganas, “High density is also explained partly by the rapid growth of urbanization in the district. In 1991, the percentage of urban population in the district has been 51.23.”

Decadal Population Growth Rate (%)

View source data.

The decadal growth of population in Habra II CD Block in 2001-2011 was 17.79%. The decadal growth of population in Habra II CD Block in 1991-2001 was 22.27%.

The decadal growth rate of population in North 24 Parganas district was as follows: 47.9% in 1951–61, 34.5% in 1961–71, 31.4% in 1971–81, 31.7% in 1981–91, 22.7% in 1991-2001 and 12.0% in 2001–11. The decadal growth rate for West Bengal in 2001-11 was 13.93%.The decadal growth rate for West Bengal in 2001-11 was 13.93%. The decadal growth rate for West Bengal was 17.84% in 1991–2001, 24.73% in 1981-1991 and 23.17% in 1971–1981.

Only a small portion of the border with Bangladesh has been fenced and it is popularly referred to as a porous border. It is freely used by Bangladeshi infiltrators, terrorists, smugglers, criminals, et al.

=== Literacy ===
As per the 2011 census, the total number of literates in Habra II CD Block was 127,039 (81.05% of the population over 6 years) out of which males numbered 68,148 (84.77% of the male population over 6 years) and females numbered 58,891 (77.14% of the female population over 6 years). The gender disparity (the difference between female and male literacy rates) was 7.64%.

See also – List of West Bengal districts ranked by literacy rate

Literacy in CD blocks of
North 24 Parganas district
Barasat Sadar subdivision
Amdanga – 80.69%
Deganga – 79.65%
Barasat I – 81.50%
Barasat II – 77.71%
Habra I – 83.15%
Habra II – 81.05%
Rajarhat – 83.13%
Basirhat subdivision
Baduria – 78.75%
Basirhat I – 72.10%
Basirhat II – 78.30%
Haroa – 73.13%
Hasnabad – 71.47%
Hingalganj – 76.85%
Minakhan – 71.33%
Sandeshkhali I – 71.08%
Sandeshkhali II – 70.96%
Swarupnagar – 77.57%
Bangaon subdivision
Bagdah – 75.30%
Bangaon – 79.71%
Gaighata – 82.32%
Barrackpore subdivision
Barrackpore I – 85.91%
Barrackpore II – 84.53%
Source: 2011 Census: CD Block Wise
Primary Census Abstract Data

=== Language and religion ===
Religion in Habra II CD block (2011)
Hinduism	53.85%
Islam	45.76%
Other or not stated	0.39%

In the 2011 census Hindus numbered 99,747 and formed 53.85% of the population in Habra II CD Block. Muslims numbered 86,052 and formed 45.76% of the population. Others numbered 691 and formed 0.39% of the population.

In 1981 Hindus numbered 79,050 and formed 80.30% of the population and Muslims numbered 18,883 and formed 19.20% of the population in Habra I CD Block. In 1981 Hindus numbered 60,268 and formed 67.12% of the population and Muslims numbered 29,206 and formed 32.53% of the population in Habra II CD Block. In 1991 Hindus numbered 180,690 and formed 63.80% of the population and Muslims numbered 101,571 and formed 35.84% of the population in Habra I and Habra II CD Blocks taken together. (In 1981 and 1991 census was conducted as per jurisdiction of the police station). In 2001, Hindus were 77,364 (51.63%) and Muslims 72,001 (48.05%).

Bengali is the predominant language, spoken by 99.52% of the population.

== Rural Poverty ==
31.75% of households in Habra II CD Block lived below poverty line in 2001, against an average of 29.28% in North 24 Parganas district.

== Economy ==
=== Livelihood ===
Livelihood
in Habra II CD Block
1. Cultivators (15.5%)
2. Agricultural labourers (31.0%)
3. Household industries (4.96%)
4. Other Workers (48.6%)

In Habra II CD Block in 2011, amongst the class of total workers, cultivators numbered 10,001 and formed 15.50% of the total workers, agricultural labourers numbered 19,978 and formed 30.97%, household industry workers numbered 3,199 and formed 4.96% and other workers numbered 31,329and formed 48.57%. Total workers numbered 64,507 and formed 36.55% of the total population, and non-workers numbered 111,983 and formed 63.45% of the population.

In more than 30 percent of the villages in North 24 Parganas, agriculture or household industry is no longer the major source of livelihood for the main workers there. The CD Blocks in the district can be classified as belonging to three categories: border areas, Sundarbans area and other rural areas. The percentage of other workers in the other rural areas category is considerably higher than those in the border areas and Sundarbans area.

Note: In the census records a person is considered a cultivator, if the person is engaged in cultivation/ supervision of land owned by self/government/institution. When a person who works on another person's land for wages in cash or kind or share, is regarded as an agricultural labourer. Household industry is defined as an industry conducted by one or more members of the family within the household or village, and one that does not qualify for registration as a factory under the Factories Act. Other workers are persons engaged in some economic activity other than cultivators, agricultural labourers and household workers. It includes factory, mining, plantation, transport and office workers, those engaged in business and commerce, teachers, entertainment artistes and so on.

=== Infrastructure ===
There are 76 inhabited villages in Habra II CD Block. 100% villages have power supply and drinking water supply. 13 villages (17.11%) have post offices. 75 villages (98.68%) have telephones (including landlines, public call offices and mobile phones). 49 villages (64.47%) have a pucca approach road and 13 villages (17.11%) have transport communication (includes bus service, rail facility and navigable waterways). 10 villages (13.16%) have agricultural credit societies and 8 villages (10.53%) have banks.

=== Agriculture ===
The North 24 Parganas district Human Development Report opines that in spite of agricultural productivity in North 24 Parganas district being rather impressive 81.84% of rural population suffered from shortage of food. With a high urbanisation of 54.3% in 2001, the land use pattern in the district is changing quite fast and the area under cultivation is declining. However, agriculture is still the major source of livelihood in the rural areas of the district.

From 1977 on wards major land reforms took place in West Bengal. Land in excess of land ceiling was acquired and distributed amongst the peasants. Following land reforms land ownership pattern has undergone transformation. In 2010–11, persons engaged in agriculture in Habra II CD Block could be classified as follows: bargadars 815 (2.76%), patta (document) holders 2,730 (9.25%), small farmers (possessing land between 1 and 2 hectares) 915 (3.10%), marginal farmers (possessing land up to 1 hectare) 12,255 (41.53%) and agricultural labourers 12,792 (43.35%).

Habra II CD Block had 120 fertiliser depots, 30 seed stores and 34 fair price shops in 2010–11.

In 2010–11, Habra II CD Block produced 15,117 tonnes of Aman paddy, the main winter crop from 6,054 hectares, 11,066 tonnes of Boro paddy (spring crop) from 3,424 hectares, 554 tonnes of Aus paddy (summer crop) from 215 hectares, 154 tonnes of wheat from 98 hectares, 34,873 tonnes of jute from 1,932 hectares and 8,143 tonnes of potatoes from 329 hectares. It also produced pulses and oilseeds.

In 2010–11, the total area irrigated in Habra II CD Block was 955 hectares, out of which 631 hectares were irrigated by deep tube well and 324 hectares by shallow tube well.

=== Pisciculture ===
In 2010–11, the net area under effective pisciculture in Habra II CD Block was 824.84 hectares. 18,675 persons were engaged in the profession. Approximate annual production was 24,745.2 quintals.

=== Banking ===
In 2010–11, Habra II CD Block had offices of 6 commercial banks and 2 gramin banks.

== Transport ==
In 2010–11, Habra II CD Block had 10 originating/ terminating bus routes.

NH 112 (old numbering NH 35) (also known as Jessore Road) passes through the Guma area of this CD Block.

There are stations like - Guma railway station and Bira railway station on the Sealdah-Bangaon line

== Education ==
In 2010–11, Habra II CD Block had 75 primary schools with 8,883 students, 8 high schools with 6,091 students and 10 higher secondary schools with 13,664 students. Habra II CD Block had 239 institutions for special and non-formal education with 10,229 students.

There are 12 Secondary Schools in this community development block affiliated to West Bengal Board of Secondary Education.

1. Dighara Haradayal Vidyapith
2. Tangra Adarsha Sikshaniketan
3. Rajibpore A.V. High School
4. Rajibpore Girls High School
5. Bira Ballavpara High School
6. Bira Ballavpara Santipipasha Ballav High School
7. Guma Rabindra Vidyapith
8. Nazrul Balika Vidyalaya
9. Suria Moulana Abul Kalam Azad High School
10. Natni High School
11. Mena Sarojini Pahar High School
12. Sendanga Chaturdash Pally High School

As per the 2011 census, in Habra II CD Block, amongst the 76 inhabited villages, 2 villages did not have a school, 18 villages had more than 1 primary school, 19 villages had at least 1 primary and 1 middle school and 13 villages had at least 1 middle and 1 secondary school.

== Healthcare ==
In 2011, Habra II CD Block had 1 block primary health centre and 2 primary health centres, with total 23 beds and 4 doctors (excluding private bodies). It had 27 family welfare subcentres. 1,413 patients were treated indoors and 71,591 patients were treated outdoor in the hospitals, health centres and subcentres of the CD Block.

Sabdalpur Rural Hospital at Sabdalpur with 30 beds functions as the main medical facility in Habra II CD Block. There are primary health centres at Bira Ballabhpur (Pukurkona PHC with 10 beds) and Sendanga (Pumlia PHC with 6 beds).

Habra II block is one of the areas where ground water is affected by arsenic contamination.
