= Habra I =

- Community development block
- Interactive map of Habra I
- Coordinates: 22.86°N 88.75°E
- Country: India
- State: West Bengal
- District: North 24 Parganas

Government
  - Type: Representative democracy

Area
  - Total: 117.36 km^{2} (45.31 sq mi)
- Elevation: 9 m (30 ft)

Population (2011)
  - Total: 225,200
  - Density: 1,919/km^{2} (4,970/sq mi)

Languages
  - Official: Bengali, English

Literacy (2011)
  - Total literates: 168,687 (83.15%)
- Time zone: UTC+5:30 (IST)
- PIN: 743263 (Habra); 743704 (Guma); 743234 (Bira Ballavepara)
- Telephone/STD code: 03216
- ISO 3166 code: IN-WB
- Vehicle registration: WB-23, WB-24, WB-25, WB-26
- Lok Sabha constituency: Barasat, Bangaon
- Vidhan Sabha constituency: Habra, Gaighata
- Website: north24parganas.nic.in

Habra I is a community development block that forms an administrative division in Barasat Sadar subdivision of North 24 Parganas district in the Indian state of West Bengal.

== Geography ==
Sadpur, a census town in Habra I block, is located at 22°52′N 88°45′E.

Habra I CD Block is bounded by Gaighata CD Block in the north, Swarupnagar and Baduria CD Blocks in the east, Deganga and Barasat I CD Blocks in the south, and Habra II CD Block in the west.

Habra I CD Block is part of the North Bidyadhari Plain, one of the three physiographic regions in the district located in the lower Ganges Delta. The area is full of marshes and salt water lakes. The Bidyadhari originates in this block and has a long course through the central part of the district. The Jamuna passes through this block.

Habra I CD Block has an area of 117.36 km^{2}. It has 1 panchayat samity, 7 gram panchayats, 129 gram sansads (village councils), 58 mouzas and 58 inhabited villages, as per the District Statistical Handbook: North 24 Parganas. Habra police station serves this block. Headquarters of this CD Block is at Habra.

Gram panchayats of Habra I block are: Bergoom-I, Bergoom-II, Kumra, Machhlandapur-I, Machhlandapur-II, Prithiba and Routara.

== Demographics ==
=== Population ===
As per 2011 Census of India Habra I CD Block had a total population of 225,200, of which 175,651 were rural and 49,549 were urban. There were 116,027 (52%) males and 109,173 (48%) females. Population below 6 years was 22,325. Scheduled Castes numbered 77,965 (34.62%) and Scheduled Tribes numbered 6,376 (2.83%).

As per 2001 census, Habra I block has a total population of 188,112 out of which 97,146 were males and 90,966 were females. Population of the rural areas in the block was 165,216 and that of the urban areas was 22,096.

Census towns in Habra I CD Block were (2011 census figures in brackets): Nokpul (7,737), Maslandapur (10,790), Sadpur (7,773), Betpuli (9,404), Anarbaria (5,895) and Purbba Narayanpur (7,950).

Large villages in Habra I CD Block were (2011 census figures in brackets): Janaphul (9,515), Lakshmipul (4,238), Dakshin Sarai (5,285), Marakpur (5,053), Mahisa Machhlandapur (6,488), Sonakene (6,933), Bergum (6,989), Krishna Nagar (5,187), Phultala (7,775), Kashipur (5,877), Kumra (5,410) and Rajballabhpur (6,909).

North 24 Parganas district is densely populated, mainly because of the influx of refugees from East Pakistan (later Bangladesh). With a density of population of 2,182 per km^{2} in 1971, it was 3rd in terms of density per km^{2} in West Bengal after Kolkata and Howrah, and 20th in India. According to the District Human Development Report: North 24 Parganas, “High density is also explained partly by the rapid growth of urbanization in the district. In 1991, the percentage of urban population in the district has been 51.23.”

Decadal Population Growth Rate (%)

View source data.

The decadal growth of population in Habra I CD Block in 2001-2011 was 17.10%. The decadal growth of population in Habra I CD Block in 1991-2001 was 19.68%.

The decadal growth rate of population in North 24 Parganas district was as follows: 47.9% in 1951-61, 34.5% in 1961-71, 31.4% in 1971-81, 31.7% in 1981-91, 22.7% in 1991-2001 and 12.0% in 2001-11. The decadal growth rate for West Bengal in 2001-11 was 13.93%. The decadal growth rate for West Bengal was 17.84% in 1991-2001, 24.73% in 1981-1991 and 23.17% in 1971-1981.

Only a small portion of the border with Bangladesh has been fenced and it is popularly referred to as a porous border. It is freely used by Bangladeshi infiltrators, terrorists, smugglers, criminals, et al.

=== Literacy ===
As per the 2011 census, the total number of literates in Habra I CD Block was 168,687 (83.15% of the population over 6 years) out of which males numbered 91,058 (87.11% of the male population over 6 years) and females numbered 77,629 (78.94% of the female population over 6 years). The gender disparity (the difference between female and male literacy rates) was 8.17%.

See also – List of West Bengal districts ranked by literacy rate

Literacy in CD blocks of
North 24 Parganas district
Barasat Sadar subdivision
Amdanga – 80.69%
Deganga – 79.65%
Barasat I – 81.50%
Barasat II – 77.71%
Habra I – 83.15%
Habra II – 81.05%
Rajarhat – 83.13%
Basirhat subdivision
Baduria – 78.75%
Basirhat I – 72.10%
Basirhat II – 78.30%
Haroa – 73.13%
Hasnabad – 71.47%
Hingalganj – 76.85%
Minakhan – 71.33%
Sandeshkhali I – 71.08%
Sandeshkhali II – 70.96%
Swarupnagar – 77.57%
Bangaon subdivision
Bagdah – 75.30%
Bangaon – 79.71%
Gaighata – 82.32%
Barrackpore subdivision
Barrackpore I – 85.91%
Barrackpore II – 84.53%
Source: 2011 Census: CD Block Wise
Primary Census Abstract Data

=== Language and religion ===
Religion in Habra I CD block (2011)
Hinduism	73.51%
Islam	25.81%
Christianity	0.47%
Other or not stated	0.21%

In the 2011 census Hindus numbered 165,537 and formed 73.51% of the population in Habra I CD Block. Muslims numbered 58,132 and formed 25.81% of the population. Others numbered 1,531 and formed 0.68% of the population.

In 1981 Hindus numbered 79,050 and formed 80.30% of the population and Muslims numbered 18,883 and formed 19.20% of the population in Habra I CD Block. In 1981 Hindus numbered 60,268 and formed 67.12% of the population and Muslims numbered 29,206 and formed 32.53% of the population in Habra II CD Block. In 1991 Hindus numbered 180,690 and formed 63.80% of the population and Muslims numbered 101,571 and formed 35.84% of the population in Habra I and Habra II CD Blocks taken together. (In 1981 and 1991 census was conducted as per jurisdiction of the police station). In 2001 in Habra I CD block, Hindus were 139,603 (74.19%) and Muslims 47,623 (25.31%).

Bengali is the predominant language, spoken by 99.53% of the population.

== Rural Poverty ==
34.81% of households in Habra I CD Block lived below poverty line in 2001, against an average of 29.28% in North 24 Parganas district.

== Economy ==
=== Livelihood ===
Livelihood
in Habra I CD Block
1. Cultivators (9.97%)
2. Agricultural labourers (25.1%)
3. Household industries (6.85%)
4. Other Workers (58.0%)

In Habra I CD Block in 2011, amongst the class of total workers, cultivators numbered 8,223 and formed 9.97% of the total workers, agricultural labourers numbered 20,733 and formed 25.14%, household industry workers numbered 5,645 and formed 6.85% and other workers numbered 47,859 and formed 58.04%. Total workers numbered 82,460 and formed 36.62% of the total population, and non-workers numbered 142,740 and formed 63.38% of the population.

In more than 30 percent of the villages in North 24 Parganas, agriculture or household industry is no longer the major source of livelihood for the main workers there. The CD Blocks in the district can be classified as belonging to three categories: border areas, Sundarbans area and other rural areas. The percentage of other workers in the other rural areas category is considerably higher than those in the border areas and Sundarbans area.

Note: In the census records a person is considered a cultivator, if the person is engaged in cultivation/ supervision of land owned by self/government/institution. When a person who works on another person’s land for wages in cash or kind or share, is regarded as an agricultural labourer. Household industry is defined as an industry conducted by one or more members of the family within the household or village, and one that does not qualify for registration as a factory under the Factories Act. Other workers are persons engaged in some economic activity other than cultivators, agricultural labourers and household workers. It includes factory, mining, plantation, transport and office workers, those engaged in business and commerce, teachers, entertainment artistes and so on.

=== Infrastructure ===
There are 55 inhabited villages in Habra I CD Block, as per the District Census Handbook: North 24 Parganas. 100% villages have power supply and drinking water supply. 12 villages (21.82%) have post offices. 55 villages (100%) have telephones (including landlines, public call offices and mobile phones). 26 villages (47.27%) have a pucca approach road and 18 villages (32.73%) have transport communication (includes bus service, rail facility and navigable waterways). 8 villages (14.55%) have agricultural credit societies and 5 villages (9.09%) have banks.

=== Agriculture ===
The North 24 Parganas district Human Development Report opines that in spite of agricultural productivity in North 24 Parganas district being rather impressive 81.84% of rural population suffered from shortage of food. With a high urbanisation of 54.3% in 2001, the land use pattern in the district is changing quite fast and the area under cultivation is declining. However, agriculture is still the major source of livelihood in the rural areas of the district.

From 1977 on wards major land reforms took place in West Bengal. Land in excess of land ceiling was acquired and distributed amongst the peasants. Following land reforms land ownership pattern has undergone transformation. In 2010-11, persons engaged in agriculture in Habra I CD Block could be classified as follows: bargadars 639 (2.30%), patta (document) holders 1,766 (6.35%), small farmers (possessing land between 1 and 2 hectares) 1,230 (4.42%), marginal farmers (possessing land up to 1 hectare) 11,663 (41.94%) and agricultural labourers 12,510 (44.99%).

Habra I CD Block had 95 fertiliser depots, 81 seed stores and 69 fair price shops in 2010-11.

In 2010-11, Habra I CD Block produced 11,876 tonnes of Aman paddy, the main winter crop from 4,900 hectares, 12,308 tonnes of Boro paddy (spring crop) from 3,553 hectares, 1,097 tonnes of Aus paddy (summer crop) from 475 hectares, 733 tonnes of wheat from 275 hectares, 39,263 tonnes of jute from 2,073 hectares and 4,847 tonnes of potatoes from 136 hectares. It also produced pulses and oilseeds.

In 2010-11, the total area irrigated in Habra I CD Block was 776 hectares, out of which 987 40 hectares were irrigated by river lift irrigation, 664 hectares by deep tube well, 18 hectares by shallow tube well and 54 hectares by other means.

=== Pisciculture ===
In 2010-11, the net area under effective pisciculture in Habra I CD Block was 876.41 hectares. 20,750 persons were engaged in the profession. Approximate annual production was 26,292.3 quintals.

=== Banking ===
In 2010-11, Habra I CD Block had offices of 10 commercial banks and 1 gramin bank.

== Transport ==
In 2010-11, Habra I CD Block had 4 originating/ terminating bus routes.

NH 112 (old numbering NH 35) (also known as Jessore Road) and SH 3 has a common route through some part of this block and then they follow separate routes.

There are stations like - Gobardanga railway station, Maslandapur railway station, Sanhati Halt railway station, Habra railway station and Ashoknagar Road railway station on the Sealdah-Bangaon line

== Education ==
In 2010-11, Habra I CD Block had 93 primary schools with 11,409 students, 2 middle schools with 156 students, 9 high schools with 6,464 students and 10 higher secondary schools with 15,801 students. Habra I CD Block had 326 institutions for special and non-formal education with 13,692 students.

As per the 2011 census, in Habra I CD Block, amongst the 55 inhabited villages, all villages had a school, 35 villages had more than 1 primary school, 26 villages had at least 1 primary and 1 middle school and 15 villages had at least 1 middle and 1 secondary school.

== Healthcare ==
In 2011, Habra I CD Block had 1 block primary health centre and 2 primary health centres, with total 26 beds and 7 doctors (excluding private bodies). It had 29 family welfare subcentres. 567 patients were treated indoors and 49,399 patients were treated outdoor in the hospitals, health centres and subcentres of the CD Block.

Maslandapur Rural Hospital at Maslandapur with 30 beds functions as the main medical facility in Habra I CD Block. There is a primary health centre at Rautara (with 10 beds).

Habra I block is one of the areas where ground water is affected by arsenic contamination.

== See also ==
- Mahisha Machhlandapur
