= Sumay Hira =

Indian politician (born 1959)

Sumay Hira (born 1959) is an Indian politician from West Bengal. He is a member of the West Bengal Legislative Assembly from the Ashoknagar Assembly constituency in North 24 Parganas district representing the Bharatiya Janata Party.

== Early life and education ==
Hira is from Ashoknagar, North 24 Parganas district, West Bengal. He is the son of the late Aswini Hira. He completed his MBBS at a college affiliated with Calcutta University in 1989. He is a medical practitioner. He declared assets worth Rs.4 crore in his affidavit to the Election Commission of India.

== Career ==
Hira won the Ashoknagar Assembly constituency representing the Bharatiya Janata Party in the 2026 West Bengal Legislative Assembly election. He polled 96,807 votes and defeated his nearest rival and sitting MLA, Narayan Goswami of the All India Trinamool Congress by a margin of 9,408 votes.
