= Dhiman Roy =

Indian politician

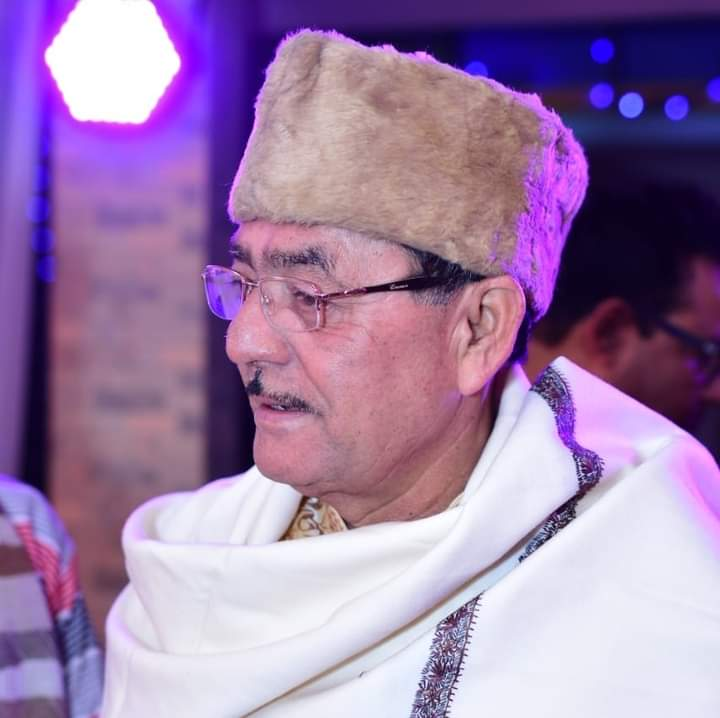

Member of the West Bengal Legislative Assembly
- In office 2011–2021
- Chief minister: Mamata Banerjee
- Preceded by: Satyasebi Kar
- Succeeded by: Narayan Goswami
- Constituency: Ashoknagar (Vidhan Sabha constituency)

Personal details
- Party: All India Trinamool Congress
- Occupation: Politician

Dhiman Roy is an Indian Politician from the state of West Bengal. He is a two term member of the West Bengal Legislative Assembly.

== Constituency ==
He represents the Ashoknagar (Vidhan Sabha constituency).

== Political Party ==
He is from the All India Trinamool Congress.
