= Ashoknagar Road railway station =

Railway station in West Bengal, India

Ashoknagar Road
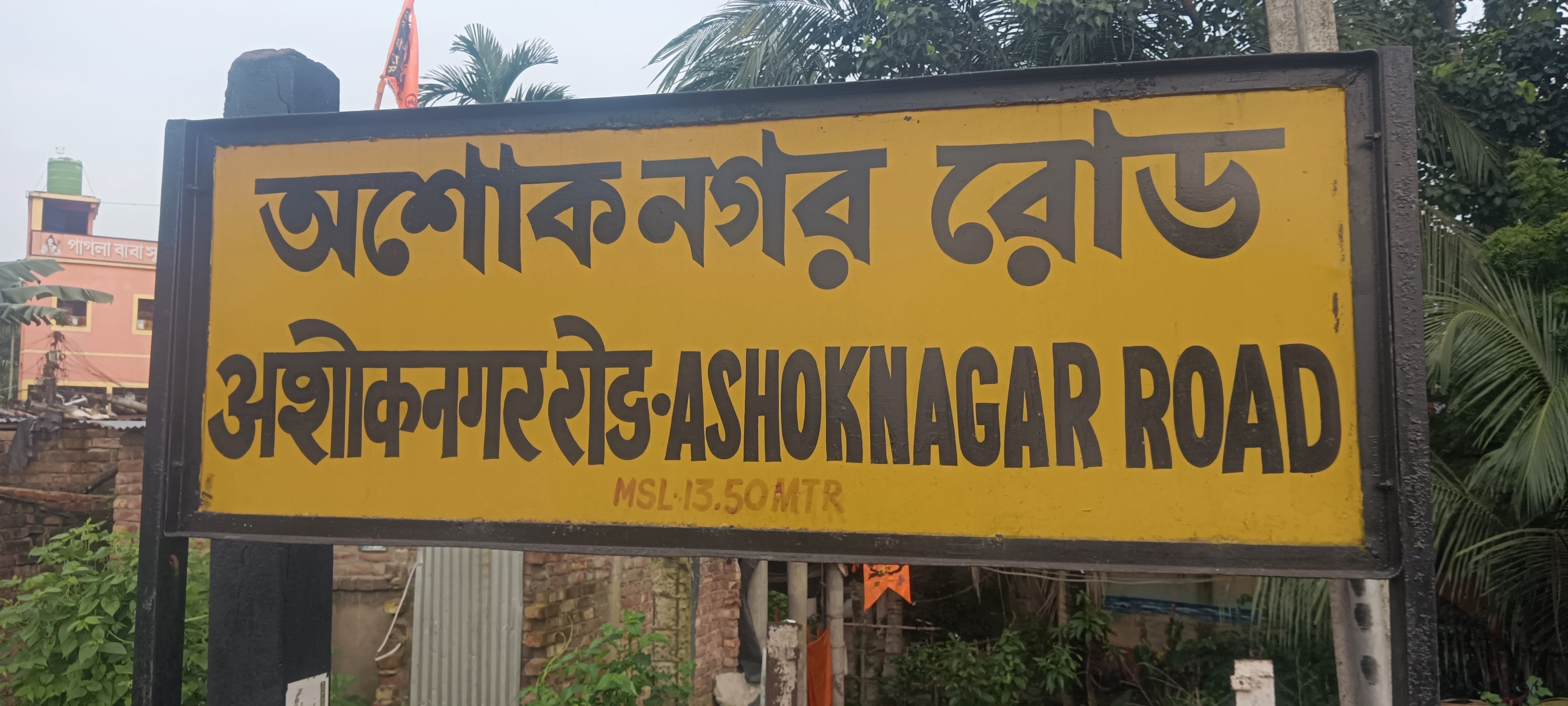
- Ashoknagar Road railway station

General information
- Location: Ashoknagar, North 24 Parganas district, West Bengal; India
- Coordinates: 22.826563°N 88.628568°E
- Elevation: 13 metres (43 ft)
- System: Kolkata Suburban Railway
- Owner: Indian Railways
- Operator: Eastern Railway
- Line: Sealdah–Hasnabad–Bangaon–Ranaghat line of Kolkata Suburban Railway
- Platforms: 2
- Tracks: 2

Construction
- Structure type: At grade
- Parking: No
- Cycle facilities: Yes

Other information
- Status: Functional
- Station code: ASKR
- Zone(s): Eastern Railway
- Division(s): Sealdah

History
- Opened: 1906; 120 years ago
- Electrified: 1972; 54 years ago

Services
Preceding station	Kolkata Suburban Railway	Following station
Guma towards Sealdah	Eastern Line Dum Dum–Bangaon branch line	Habra towards Bangaon Junction
Route map
Location
- Location within West Bengal Location within India

Ashoknagar Road is a small railway station in North 24 Parganas district, West Bengal. Its code is ASKR. It serves Ashoknagar Kalyangarh City. The station consists of two platforms. The platform is not well sheltered. It lacks many facilities including water and sanitation.

== Location ==
Ashoknagar Road is located on Sealdah–Hasnabad–Bangaon–Ranaghat line of Kolkata Suburban Railway. Link between Dum Dum to Khulna now in Bangladesh, via Bangaon was constructed by Bengal Central Railway Company in 1882–84. The Sealdah–Dum Dum–Barasat–Ashok Nagar–Bangaon sector was electrified in 1963–64.

== See also ==
- North 24 Parganas district
- Indian Railways
- Sealdah
- Sealdah–Hasnabad–Bangaon–Ranaghat line
- Bangaon Junction
- Transport in West Bengal
- List of railway stations in India
