= Jyotipriya Mallick =

Indian politician (born 1958)

Cabinet Minister, Government of West Bengal
- In office 10 May 2021 – 17 February 2024
- Governor: Jagdeep Dhankhar; La. Ganesan (additional charge); C. V. Ananda Bose
- Chief Minister: Mamata Banerjee
- Department: Forest Affairs
- Preceded by: Rajib Banerjee (Forest Affairs); Subrata Mukherjee (Non-Conventional and Renewable Energy)
- Succeeded by: Birbaha Hansda (Forest Affairs)
- In office 20 May 2011 – 10 May 2021
- Governor: M. K. Narayanan; D. Y. Patil (additional charge); Keshari Nath Tripathi; Jagdeep Dhankhar
- Chief Minister: Mamata Banerjee
- Department: Food & Supplies
- Succeeded by: Rathin Ghosh

Member of West Bengal Legislative Assembly
- In office 13 May 2011 – 4 May 2026
- Preceded by: P. K Bhattacharya
- Succeeded by: Debdas Mondal
- Constituency: Habra
- In office 2001 – May 2011
- Constituency: Gaighata

Personal details
- Born: 17 November 1957 (age 68)
- Party: All India Trinamool Congress till 19th june 2026

Jyotipriya Mallick is an Indian politician and former Minister for Department of Forest Affairs and Non-Conventional and Renewable Energy Sources in the Government of West Bengal. He previously served as the Minister for Food & Supplies in the Government of West Bengal. He is also an MLA, elected from the Habra constituency in the 2011 West Bengal state assembly election. In 2016 and 2021 assembly election he was re-elected from the same constituency. On 27 October 2023 he was arrested by ED for ration scam. He was granted bail on 15 January 2025. Mallick officially left the Trinamool on 20 June 2026, citing doctors advice concerning an illness.

== Controversy ==
On 27 October 2023, Mallick was arrested by the ED in the ration corruption case. He fell ill during the hearing after being produced in the court. He was then taken to ED custody after being discharged after 7 days in the hospital. He got bail on 15 January 2025.
