= Badal Bhattacharya =

Indian politician

Member of West Bengal Legislative Assembly
- In office 1999–2001
- Preceded by: Nirode Roy Choudhury
- Succeeded by: Sarmishtha Dutta
- Constituency: Ashoknagar

Personal details
- Born: 1944/45
- Died: 1 November 2015 (aged 69–70)
- Party: Bharatiya Janata Party

Badal Bhattacharya was an Indian politician. He was elected as MLA of Ashoknagar Vidhan Sabha Constituency in West Bengal Legislative Assembly in 1999. He was the first legislator of Bharatiya Janata Party in West Bengal Legislative Assembly. He died on 1 November 2014 at the age of 70.
