= Debdas Mondal =

Indian politician

Member of the West Bengal Legislative Assembly
- Incumbent
- Assumed office 4 May 2026
- Preceded by: Jyotipriya Mallick
- Constituency: Habra

Personal details
- Party: Bharatiya Janata Party
- Profession: Politician

Debdas Mondal is a politician from West Bengal. He is a member of West Bengal Legislative Assembly, from Habra Assembly constituency. He is a member of Bharatiya Janata Party.
