= Guma, India =

Guma
- village
- Location in West Bengal, India Guma (India)
- Coordinates: 22.83°N 88.63°E
- Country: India
- State: West Bengal
- District: North 24 Parganas
- Elevation: 8 m (26 ft)

Population (2011)
  - Total: 12,025

Languages
  - Official: Bengali, English
- Time zone: UTC+5:30 (IST)
- PIN: 743704
- Telephone code: 03216
- ISO 3166 code: IN-WB
- Vehicle registration: WB
- Lok Sabha constituency: Barasat
- Vidhan Sabha constituency: Ashoknagar
- Website: north24parganas.nic.in

Guma is a Village in the Habra II CD block of Barasat sadar subdivision in North 24 Parganas district in the Indian state of West Bengal.

== Geography ==
Cities, towns and locations in Barasat subdivision, North 24 Parganas
M: municipal town, CT: census town, R: rural/ urban centre, H: historical centre
Owing to space constraints in the small map, the actual locations in a larger map may vary slightly

=== Location ===
Guma is located at 22.83°N 88.63°E.

Guma is located in the Ganges Brahmaputra delta region in the district of North 24 parganas, West Bengal state in eastern India. It is 38 km from Sealdah Station and 15 km from Barasat on the Sealdah-Bangaon branch line of Eastern Railway. Bidyadhari River runs through Guma.

Guma Bara Bamonia and Khordabamonia forms a cluster of Census town(CT).

=== Area overview ===
The area covered in the map alongside is largely a part of the north Bidyadhari Plain. located in the lower Ganges Delta. The country is flat. It is a little raised above flood level and the highest ground borders the river channels. 54.67% of the people of the densely populated area lives in the urban areas and 45.33% lives in the rural areas.

Note: The map alongside presents some of the notable locations in the subdivision. All places marked in the map are linked in the larger full screen map.

=== Climate ===
The climate is tropical — like the rest of the Gangetic West Bengal. The hallmark is the Monsoon — from early June to mid-September. The weather remains dry during the winter (mid-November to mid-February) and humid during summer.

Temperature: 39.5 °C (103.1 °F) in May (max) and 10.3 °C (50.5 °F) in January (min)

Relative Humidity: Between 55% in March & 98% in July

Rainfall: 31 mm (1.2 in) (normal)

== Demographics ==
According to the 2011 Census of India, Guma had a total population of 12,025, of which 6,089 (51%) were males and 5,936 (49%) were females. Population in the age range 0–6 years was 1,190. The total number of literate persons in Guma was 9,479 (87.49% of the population over 6 years).

According to the 2011 Census of India, Habra Urban Agglomeration had a total population of 304,584, of which 154,863 (51%) were males and 149,723 (49%) were females. Population in the age range 0–6 years was 23,023. The total number of literate persons in Habra UA was 256,313 (91.03% of the population over 6 years). The constituents of Habra Urban Agglomeration were Habra (M), Ashoknagar Kalyangarh (M), Bara Bamonia (CT), Guma (CT), Anarbaria (CT) and Khorddabamonia (CT).

As of 2001 India census, total Guma had a population of 9,297. Males constitute 51% of the population and females 49%. Guma has an average literacy rate of 72%, higher than the national average of 59.5%: male literacy is 79%, and female literacy is 69%. In Guma, 13% of the population is under 6 years of age.

== Administration ==
Guma falls under the jurisdiction of Ashokenagar Police Station. Guma I and Guma II gram panchayats are responsible for development of Guma. It falls under the Assembly constituency of Ashoknagar (Vidhan Sabha constituency) and Barasat (Lok Sabha constituency). Headquarters of Habra II (community development block) is at Guma.

Panchayat and BDO office is well connected with Optical fiber broadband. A new building for traffic police has been built at Guma bus station.

== Healthcare ==
North 24 Parganas district has been identified as one of the areas where ground water is affected by arsenic contamination. Local clubs sometimes conducts health awareness programmes with the help of Department of health and Gram panchayats.

Guma Sub-Health Center is situated in the junction of Guma-Rajibpur Road and Kamarpur Road.also here now new health center besides guma 1 no panchayat. Guma is also an Open defecation free town.

102 (ambulance service) is also available for 24/7.

== Education ==
There are two higher secondary schools and sufficient primary schools in Guma. Students wanting to proceed secondary education, sometimes have to travel to nearby towns or villages for that purpose. Other than that there are two Madrasas at Choto Bamonia and Khosdelpur. There is no college in Guma. Office of the Habra II CD Block Sub-Inspector of Schools is also in Guma.

=== Primary schools ===
- Guma Nimno Buniadi Vidyalay
- Palpara Prathomik Vidyalay
- Guma Sishu Bikash
- Nabanalanda Sikhha Niketan
- St. Francis School
- Guma juliant kg school
- Assembly Of God Church School
- Guma Public School

=== Higher secondary schools ===
- Guma Rabindra Vidyapith
- Najrul Balika Vidyalaya

== Cultural ==
There are many Hindu Temples in Guma. Durga puja is the main attraction along with Ratha Yatra . During the festive time fair started in different grounds. During Holi everyone celebrates in their own way.

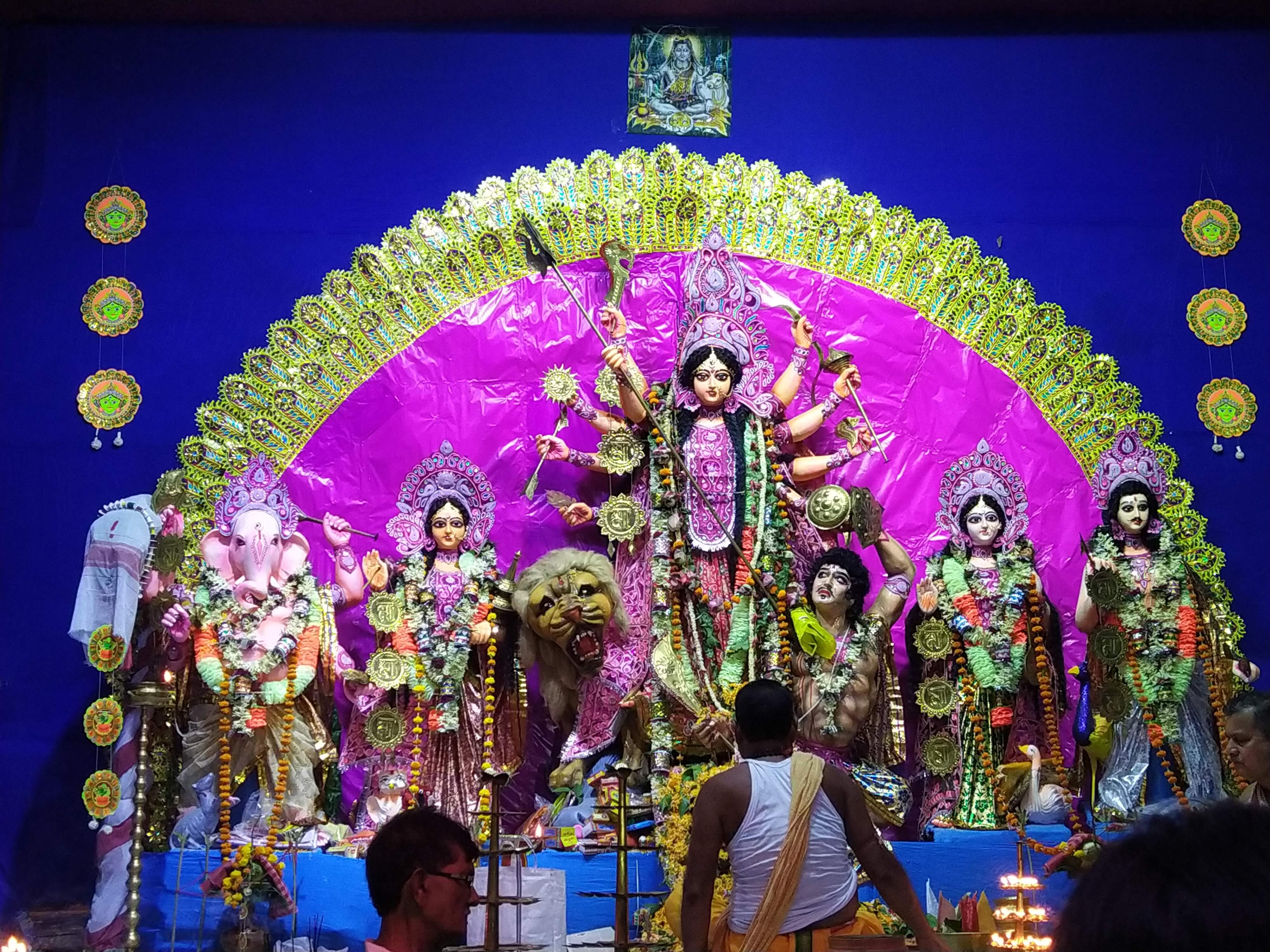
Durga puja celebrations 2021

=== Famous temples ===
- Milon Mandir
- Kali Mata Mandir
- Baba Biseswar Mandir
- Graharaj Mandir
- Sitala Mata Mandir
- Maa Monosha Mandir
- Loknath Baba Mandir
- Guma Adi Durga Mandir
- Samajmilon Mandir

=== Guma Samsan Ghat (The Burning ghat) ===
The burning ghat is situated bank of Bidyadhari River. There is a Maa Kali temple beside the Ghat. This is a famous ghat in this area. 24/7 Dead body carry car facility also available here.

=== Cultural clubs ===
There are many cultural clubs is there, those clubs are organize different cultural program like Durga Puja, Kali Puja, Saraswati Puja, football tournaments, yoga, music, painting and dance competitions. Also do other social programs like blood donation, food donation, book donation. Some famous clubs are:

- Guma Renacence
- Guma Chatrabithi Club
- Guma United Club
- Guma Jagrata Club
- Barnali Sangha
- Guma Agradutt Club
- Guma New Agrani Sangha

== Transport ==
=== Railway ===
Guma railway station is 38 km (24 mi) from Sealdah Station and 15 km (9.3 mi) from Barasat on the Sealdah-Bangaon branch line of Eastern Railway. It is part of the Kolkata Suburban Railway system. Guma railway station has been selected to be constructed as a Model Station in the 2009 rail budget. Habra local, Gobardanga local, Thakurnagar local, Bangaon local Connects Guma to Sealdah, Bangaon and other stations of Sealdah-Bangaon branch line.

=== Road ===
Guma is situated on National Highway 112 (Jessore Road) (old number NH 35). It connects Guma to Kolkata and the Bangladesh border at Petrapole. Guma is connected to the nearby villages by Guma-Rajibpur Road, Guma-Prithiba Road and Kamarpur Road. Auto rickshaws and Electric rickshaws are the mode of public transport in Guma for traveling within the town. Auto rickshaw connects this town to its nearby villages. Other towns like Habra, Duttapukur, Barasat, Naihati, chakla dham, Madhyamgram, Kalyani, Kolkata, Bagdha, etc. are connected to Guma with buses from Habra and Barasat. Few available bus services are DN-44(Bangaon to Dakshineswar), MN-3(Barasat to Nhata), DN-35(Barasat to Balti).

== Economy ==
Guma is famous for its wooden furniture shops, clay pottery, plant nursery, bike repairing shop, metal welding shops. There are many cricket wicket manufacturing industries, those factory export the wickets to different parts of India.

Biggest market area is Guma railway station. All kind of daily consumable goods are traded here.

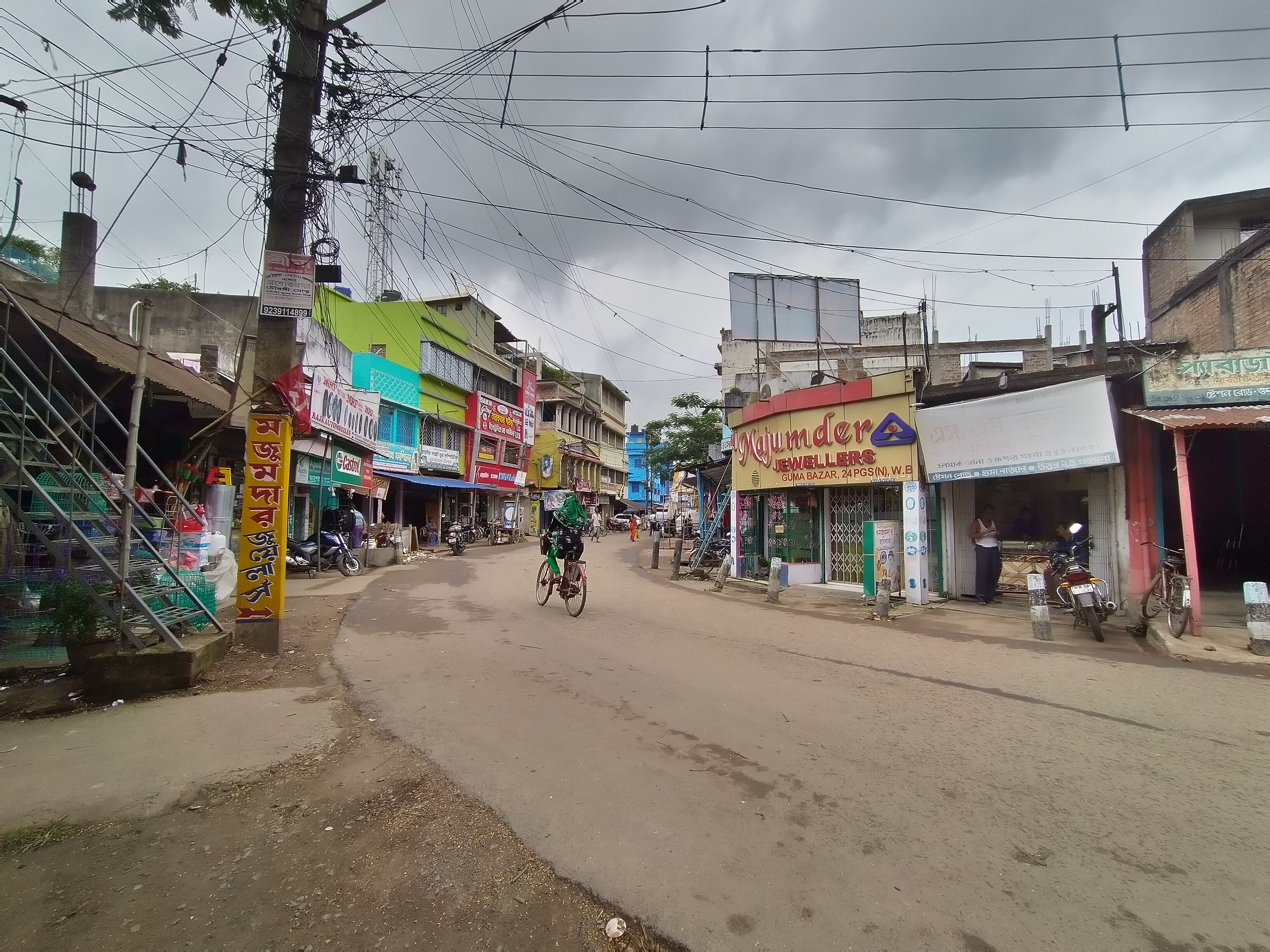
Guma station market, 2022

=== Guma Haat ===
Guma Haat (A local open-air market) is one of the oldest weekly markets, this market is open every week Thursday and Sunday. People from nearby villages come here for trade. From vegetables to grocery, fish to chicken, footwear to cloths all are sold and bought here.

=== Wooden furniture ===
The most famous business is wooden furniture. Merchants buy old furniture from various places and refurnish it for sale, also make new wooden furniture such as wooden beds, doors, frames, chairs, tables, toys.

=== Farming ===
Major farming crops are paddy, jute, and vegetables. These crops are traded in local market as well as national markets. Organic farming, Beekeeping and mushroom farming are most attracted farming nowadays. There are many mango, lychee, jackfruit, jammun gardens which product plenty of fruits. Coconut and betel nut plants frequently grow here. In winter season, date juice & jaggery is famous.

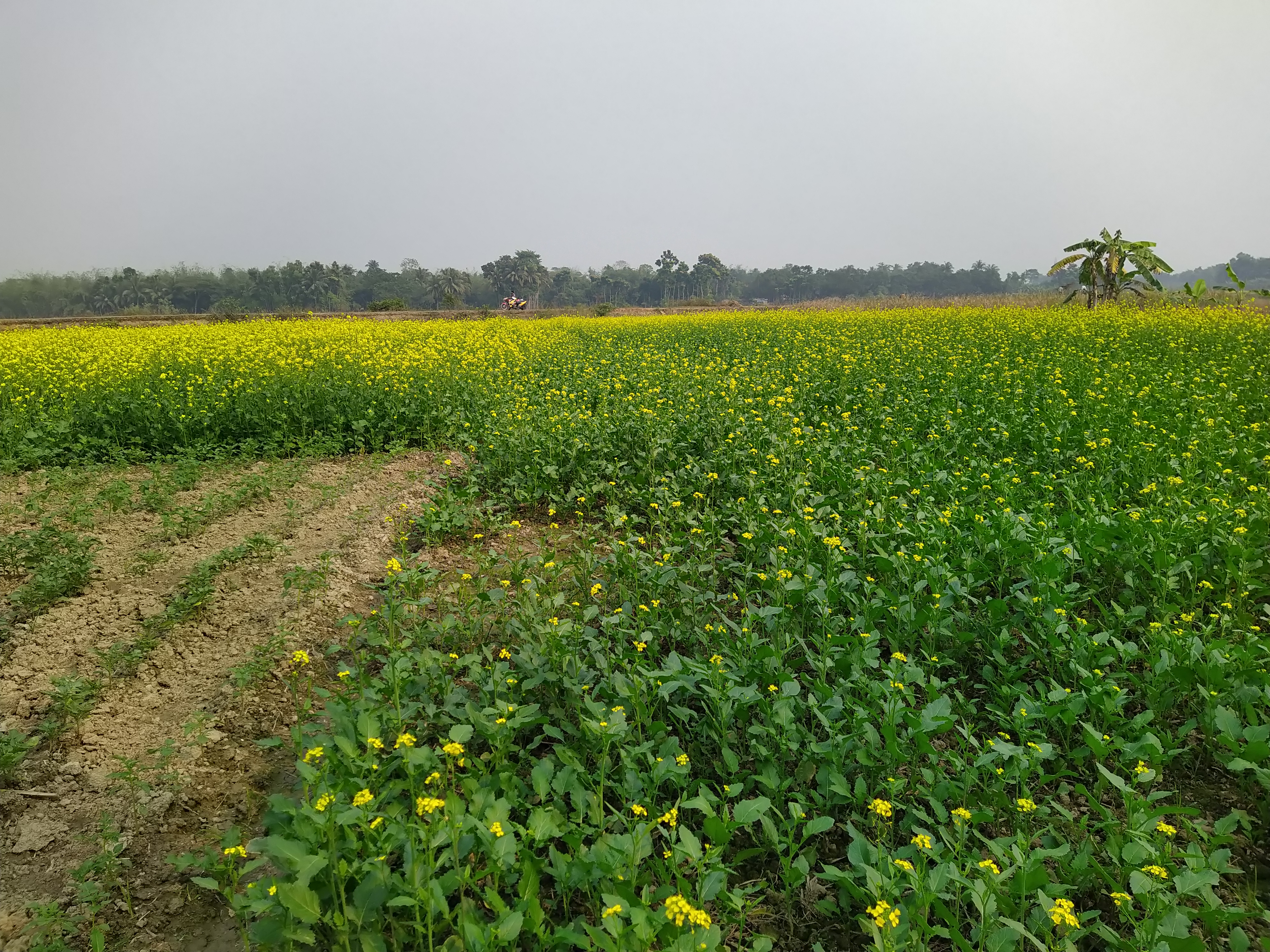
Mustard seed farming

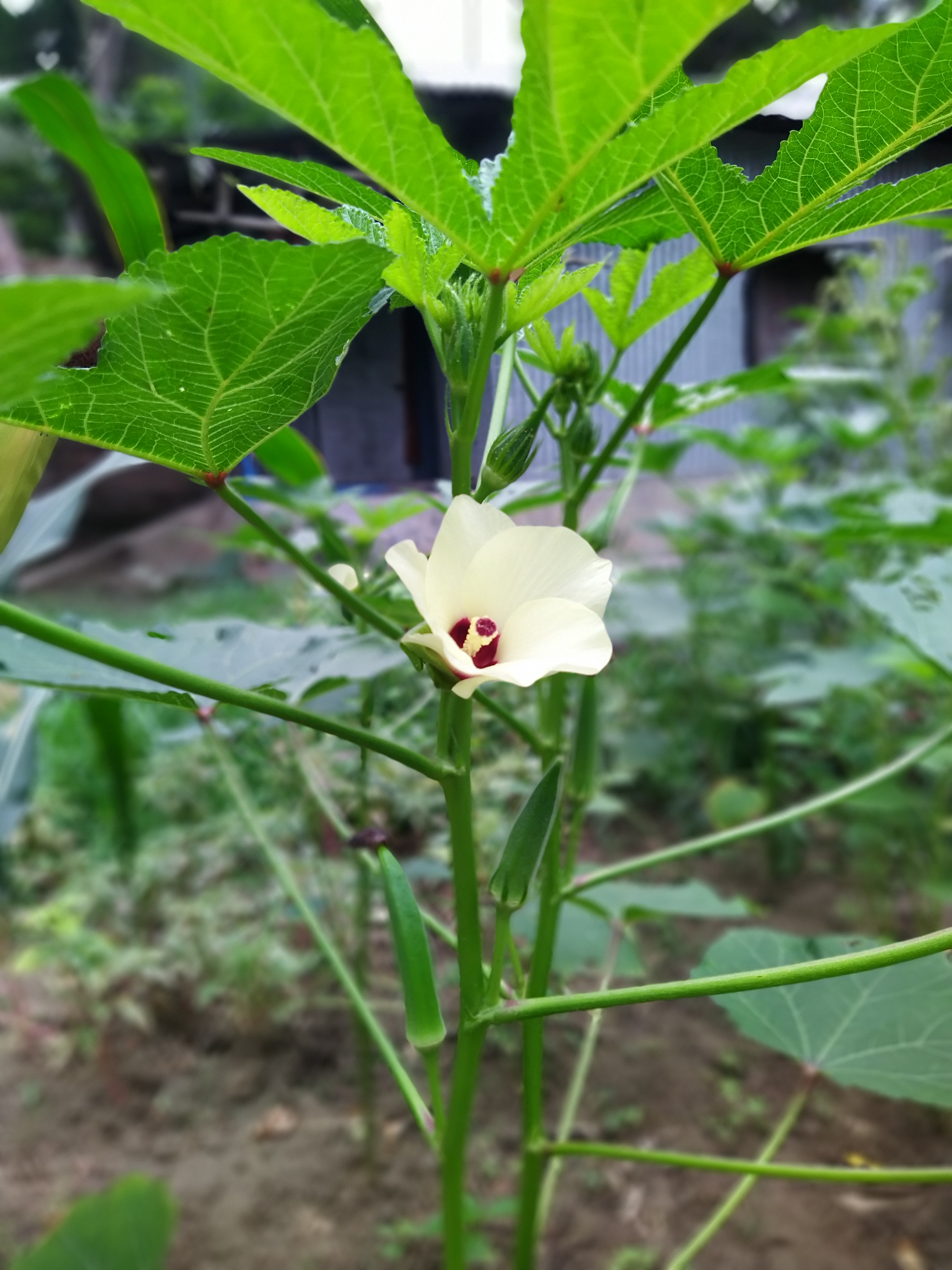
Lady finger farming

=== Flower and nursery ===
There are many flower shops are there. Merchant buy flower from Thakurnagar & surrounding and sell them here. Flower is most essential commodity in Hindu puja, wedding and other Ritual.

Many plant nursery setup are there, where plants are grown for transplanting, for use as stock for budding and grafting, or for sale. Commercial nurseries produce and distribute woody and herbaceous plants, including ornamental trees, shrubs, and bulb crops.

=== Husbandry ===
Milk industry is a growing industry in this region. Many people are employed through it, they produce raw milk and milk product and sell them Kolkata and surroundings. A dairy is a business enterprise established for the harvesting or processing (or both) of animal milk – mostly from cows or buffaloes, but also from goats & sheep – for human consumption. A dairy is typically located on a dedicated dairy farm or in a section of a multi-purpose farm (mixed farm) that is concerned with the harvesting of milk.

Goat farming involves the raising and breeding of domestic goats as a branch of animal husbandry. People farm goats principally for their meat, milk, fibre and skins.

A government owned veterinary hospital is stationed in Guma for local cattle & goat health, as well as the buying of new goats or cattle.
