= Habra =

- City
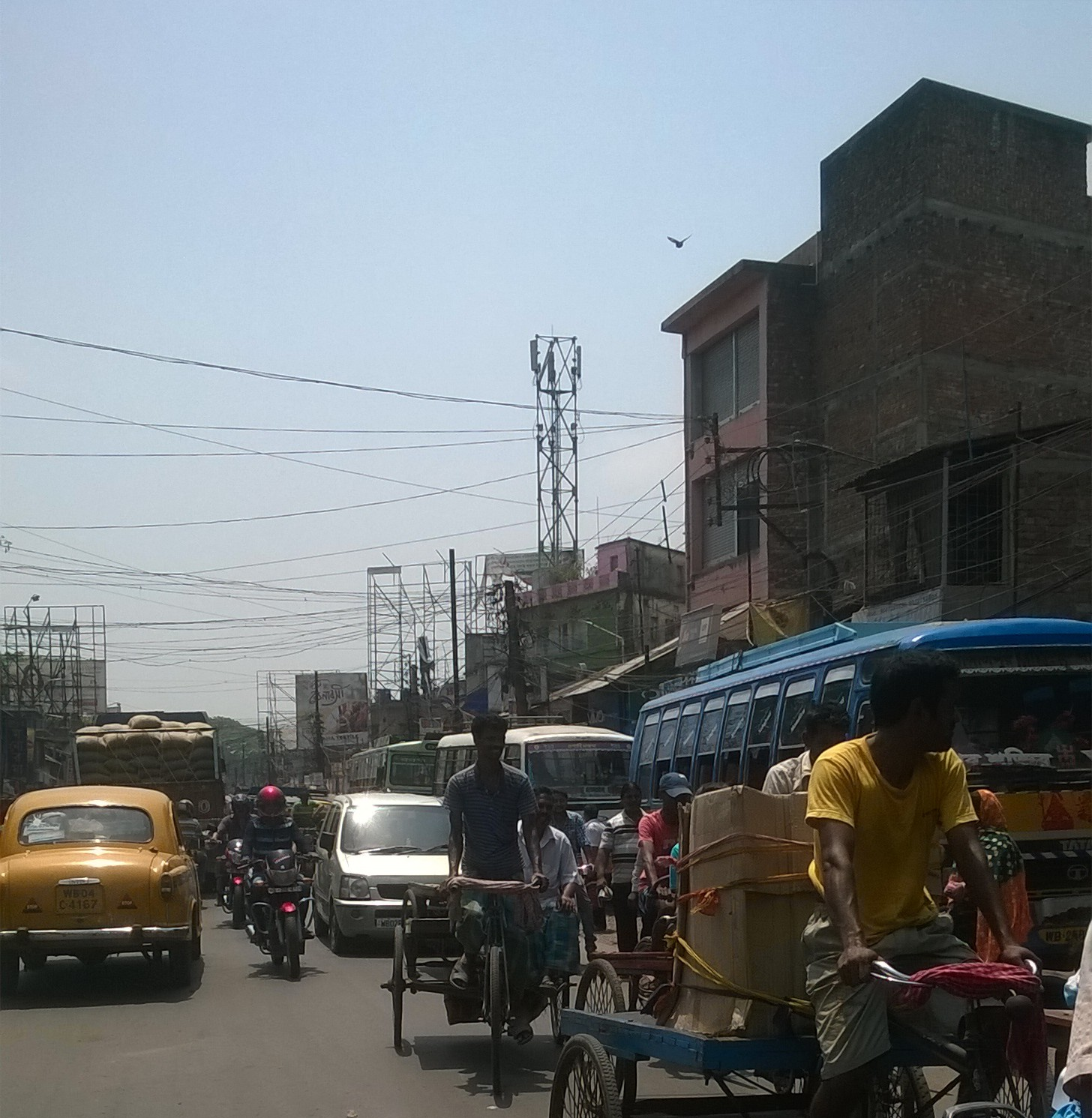
- Habra Jessore Road traffic

- Location in West Bengal, India Habra (India)
- Coordinates: 22.83°N 88.63°E
- Country: India
- State: West Bengal
- District: North 24 Parganas

Government
  - Type: Municipality
  - Body: Habra Municipality
  - Municipality Chairman: Narayan Chandra Saha
  - Municipality Vice Chairman: Sitangshu Das
  - MLA: Debdas Mondal

Area
  - City: 21.82 km^{2} (8.42 sq mi)
  - Rank: UA: 8th in West Bengal
- Elevation: 13 m (43 ft)

Population (2011)
  - City: 147,221
  - Density: 6,747/km^{2} (17,470/sq mi)
  - Metro: 304,584

Languages
  - Official: Bengali, English
- Time zone: UTC+5:30 (IST)
- Postal codes: 743269,743271,743263
- Telephone code: +91 3216
- Lok Sabha constituency: Barasat
- Vidhan Sabha constituency: Habra
- Website: www.habramunicipality.com

Habra is a city and a municipality in Barasat sadar subdivision of North 24 Parganas district in the Indian state of West Bengal.

== Geography ==
Cities, towns and locations in Barasat subdivision, North 24 Parganas
M: municipal town, CT: census town, R: rural/ urban centre, H: historical centre
Owing to space constraints in the small map, the actual locations in a larger map may vary slightly

=== Location ===
Habra is located at 22.83°N 88.63°E. It has an average elevation of 13 metres (42.6509 feet).

=== Area overview ===
The area covered in the map alongside is largely a part of the north Bidyadhari Plain, located in the lower Ganges Delta. The country is flat. It is a little raised above flood level and the highest ground borders the river channels. 54.67% of the people of the densely populated area live in the urban areas and 45.33% live in the rural areas.

Note: The map alongside presents some of the notable locations in the subdivision. All places marked in the map are linked in the larger full screen map.

== Demographics ==
According to the 2011 Census of India, Habra had a total population of 147,221, of which 74,592 (51%) were males and 72,629 (49%) were females. Population in the age range 0–6 years was 11,696. The total number of literate persons in Habra was 121,952 (89.98% of the population over 6 years).

According to the 2011 Census of India, Habra Urban Agglomeration had a total population of 304,584, of which 154,863 (51%) were males and 149,723 (49%) were females. Population in the age range 0–6 years was 23,023. The total number of literate persons in Habra UA was 256,313 (91.03% of the population over 6 years). The constituents of Habra Urban Agglomeration were Habra (M), Ashoknagar Kalyangarh (M), Bara Bamonia (CT), Guma (CT), Anarbaria (CT) and Khorddabamonia (CT).

As of 2001 India census, Habra had a population of 127,695. Males constitute 51% of the population and females 49%. Habra has an average literacy rate of 79%, higher than the national average of 59.5%: male literacy is 83%, and female literacy is 74%. In Habra, 10% of the population is under 6 years of age.

== Administration ==
=== Police station ===
Habra police station is one of the most important police stations in Nototal have 24 wards. aipality, Gobardanga municipality and Habra I CD Block.

=== Others ===
Habra I (community development block) is headquartered at Prafulla Nagar, Habra. Habra Telephone Exchange is also headquartered at Habra. Habra is one of the 100 selected cities in India which will be developed as a smart city by 2022 though this has been in question recently when Govt of India published an updated list and Habra did not appear in that apparently.

== Transport ==
=== Railway system ===
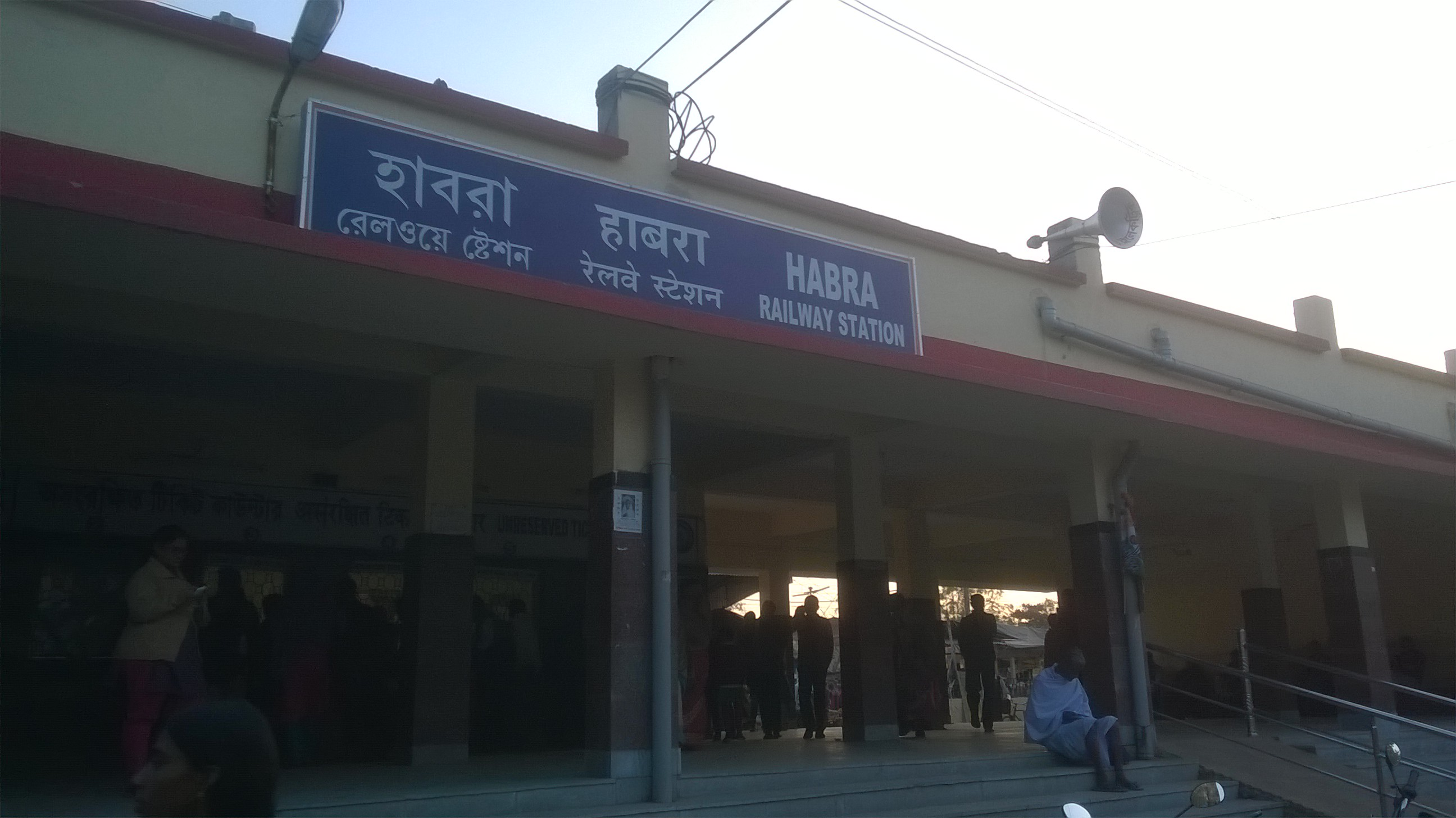
Habra railway station

== Education ==
- Jawahar Navodaya Vidyalaya (Banipur)
- St. Stephen's School
- Stratford Day School
- Sree Chaitanya College
- Sree Chaitanya Mahavidyalaya
- Banipur Mahilaa Mahavidyalaya
- Techno India College, Banipur

== See also ==
- Habra I CD Block
- Habra II CD Block
- Map of Habra I CD Block on Page 289 of District Census Handbook. It also shows the location of Habra.
- Bongaon
- Barasat
- Barrackpore
- Basirhat
