= Ashoknagar Assembly constituency =

West Bengal Legislative Assembly constituency

Ashoknagar
- Constituency No. 101 for the West Bengal Legislative Assembly
- Interactive Map Outlining Ashoknagar Assembly Constituency

Constituency details
- Country: India
- Region: East India
- State: West Bengal
- District: North 24 Parganas
- Lok Sabha constituency: Barasat
- Established: 1967
- Reservation: None

Member of Legislative Assembly
- 18th West Bengal Legislative Assembly
- Incumbent Dr. Sumay Hira
- Party: BJP
- Elected year: 2026
- Preceded by: Narayan Goswami

Most Successful parties from Ashoknagar assembly
1. Communist Party of India (Marxist) (8 times) (50.0%)
2. All India Trinamool Congress (3 times) (18.8%)
3. Communist Party of India (2 times) (12.5%)
4. Independent politician (1 time) (6.25%)
5. Bharatiya Janata Party (2 time) (12.5%)

Ashoknagar Assembly constituency is an assembly constituency in North 24 Parganas district in the Indian state of West Bengal.

== Overview ==
As per orders of the Delimitation Commission, No. 101 Ashoknagar Assembly constituency is composed of the following: Ashoknagar Kalyangarh municipality, and Habra II community development block.

Ashoknagar Assembly constituency is part of No. 17 Barasat (Lok Sabha constituency).

== Members of the Legislative Assembly ==
| Year | Name | Party |
|---|---|---|
| 1967 | Sadhan Kumar Sen | Communist Party of India |
| 1969 | Sadhan Kumar Sen | Communist Party of India |
| 1971 | Nani Kar | Communist Party of India (Marxist) |
| 1972 | Keshab Chandra Bhattacharya | Independent politician |
| 1977 | Nani Kar | Communist Party of India (Marxist) |
| 1982 | Nani Kar | Communist Party of India (Marxist) |
| 1987 | Nani Kar | Communist Party of India (Marxist) |
| 1991 | Nani Kar | Communist Party of India (Marxist) |
| 1996 | Nirode Roy Choudhury | Communist Party of India (Marxist) |
| 1999 (by-election) | Badal Bhattacharya | Bharatiya Janata Party |
| 2001 | Sarmistha Dutta | Communist Party of India (Marxist) |
| 2006 | Satyasebi Kar | Communist Party of India (Marxist) |
| 2011 | Dhiman Roy | Trinamool Congress |
| 2016 | Dhiman Roy | Trinamool Congress |
| 2021 | Narayan Goswami | Trinamool Congress |
| 2026 | Dr. Sumay Hira | Bharatiya Janata Party |

== Election results ==
=== 2026 ===
2026 West Bengal Legislative Assembly election: Ashoknagar
| Party | Candidate | Votes | % | ±% |
|---|---|---|---|---|
| BJP | Dr. Sumay Hira | 96,807 | 44.05 | ▲11.73 |
| AITC | Narayan Goswami | 87,399 | 39.77 | ▼3.41 |
| ISF | Tapas Banerjee | 29,493 | 13.42 | ▼7.71 |
| NOTA | None of the above | 1,161 | 0.53 | ▼0.21 |
| Majority | | 9,408 | 4.28 | ▼6.58 |
| Turnout | | 219,757 | 95.57 | ▲11.3 |
| BJP gain from AITC | | Swing | 9408 | |

=== 2021 ===
2021 West Bengal assembly election: Ashoknagar constituency
| Party | Candidate | Votes | % | ±% |
|---|---|---|---|---|
| AITC | Narayan Goswami | 93,587 | 43.18 | |
| BJP | Tanuja Chakraborty | 70,055 | 32.32 | |
| ISF | Tapas Banerjee | 45,795 | 21.13 | |
| NOTA | None of the above | 1,611 | 0.74 | |
| Majority | | 23,532 | 10.86 | |
| Turnout | | 216,724 | 84.27 | |
| AITC hold | | Swing | | |

=== 2016 ===
2016 West Bengal state assembly election: Ashoknagar constituency
| Party | Candidate | Votes | % | ±% |
|---|---|---|---|---|
| AITC | Dhiman Roy | 98,042 | 49.98 | ▼5.41 |
| CPI(M) | Satyasebi Kar | 75,143 | 38.30 | ▼0.85 |
| BJP | Tanuja Chakraborty | 16,429 | 8.37 | ▲5.93 |
| BSP | Tarakeswar Hawlader | 1,582 | 0.81 | ▼0.03 |
| RPI(A) | Ajit Kumar Sarkar | 1,339 | 0.68 | |
| CPI(ML)L | Jayasri Das | 1,262 | 0.64 | ▼0.41 |
| Majority | | 22,899 | 11.67 | ▼4.57 |
| Turnout | | 196,181 | 86.40 | |
| AITC hold | | Swing | | |

=== 2011 ===
In the 2011 election, Dhiman Roy of Trinamool Congress defeated his nearest rival Satyasebi Kar of CPI(M).

2011 West Bengal state assembly election: Ashoknagar constituency
| Party | Candidate | Votes | % | ±% |
|---|---|---|---|---|
| AITC | Dhiman Roy | 94,451 | 55.39 | +6.30# |
| CPI(M) | Satyasebi Kar | 66,759 | 39.15 | −6.93 |
| BJP | Gopal Nandi | 4,168 | 2.44 | |
| CPI(ML)L | Jayasri Das | 1,783 | 1.05 | |
| BSP | Tarakeswar Hawlader | 1,428 | 0.84 | |
| Independent | Tapas Roy | 1,344 | | |
| Independent | Uttam Kumar Raha | 6,000 | | |
| Majority | | 27,692 | 16.24 | |
| Turnout | | 170,533 | 88.55 | |
| AITC gain from CPI(M) | | Swing | 13.43# | |

.# Swing calculated on Congress+Trinamool Congress vote percentages taken together in 2006.

=== 2006 ===
In the 2006 state assembly elections, Satyasebi Kar of CPI(M) won the Ashoknagar assembly seat, defeating his nearest rival Dhiman Roy of Trinamool Congress. Contests in most years were multi cornered but only winners and runners-up are being mentioned. Sarmistha Dutta of CPI(M) defeated Ashok Krishna Dutt of Trinamool Congress in 2001. Badal Bhattacharya of BJP defeated Rekha Goswami of CPIM in the 1999 Bye election, caused by the death of sitting MLA, Nirode Roy Chowdhury. Nirode Roy Choudhury of CPI(M) defeated Dhiman Roy of Congress in 1996. Nani Kar of CPI(M) defeated Keshab Chandra Bhattacharya of Congress/ Independent in 1991, 1987, 1982 and 1977.

=== 1972 ===
Keshab Chandra Bhattacharya, Independent, won in 1972. Nani Kar of CPI(M) won in 1971. Sadhan Kumar Sen of CPI won in 1969 and 1967. Prior to that the Ashoknagar seat was not there.
