= Guma railway station =

Railway station in West Bengal, India

Guma

General information
- Location: Guma, North 24 Parganas district, West Bengal; India
- Coordinates: 22.8084°N 88.6008°E
- Elevation: 8 metres (26 ft)
- System: Kolkata Suburban Railway station
- Owner: Indian Railways
- Operator: Eastern Railway
- Line: Sealdah–Hasnabad–Bangaon–Ranaghat line of Kolkata Suburban Railway
- Platforms: 2
- Tracks: 2

Construction
- Structure type: At grade
- Parking: Yes
- Cycle facilities: Yes

Other information
- Status: Functional
- Station code: GUMA
- Zone(s): Eastern Railway
- Division(s): Sealdah

History
- Opened: 1906; 120 years ago
- Electrified: 1972; 54 years ago

Services
Preceding station	Kolkata Suburban Railway	Following station
Bira towards Sealdah	Eastern Line Dum Dum–Bangaon branch line	Ashoknagar Road towards Bangaon Junction
Route map
Location
- Location within West Bengal Location within India

Guma railway station is a small railway station in North 24 Parganas district, West Bengal. Its code is GUMA. It serves the town of Guma. The station consists of two well sheltered platforms. It has many facilities including water and sanitation.

== The station ==
=== Location ===
Guma is located on Sealdah–Hasnabad–Bangaon–Ranaghat line of Kolkata Suburban Railway. Link between Dum Dum to Khulna now in Bangladesh, via Bangaon was constructed by Bengal Central Railway Company in 1882–84. The Sealah–Dum Dum–Barasat–Ashok Nagar–Bangaon sector was electrified in 1963–64.

=== Accommodations and facilities ===
A well maintained public toilet is available, as well as drinking water, a garden, and an ATVM (Automatic Ticket Vending Machine), free WiFi facility is also available in this station.

== See also ==
- North 24 Parganas district
- Indian Railways
- Sealdah
- Sealdah–Hasnabad–Bangaon–Ranaghat line
- Bangaon Junction
- Transport in West Bengal
- List of railway stations in India
