= Habra Assembly constituency =

State-level election constituency in West Bengal, India

Habra
- Constituency No. 100 for the West Bengal Legislative Assembly
- Interactive Map Outlining Habra Assembly Constituency

Constituency details
- Country: India
- Region: East India
- State: West Bengal
- District: North 24 Parganas
- Lok Sabha constituency: Barasat
- Established: 1951
- Total electors: 242,425
- Reservation: None

Member of Legislative Assembly
- 18th West Bengal Legislative Assembly
- Incumbent Debdas Mondal
- Party: BJP
- Elected year: 2026
- Preceded by: Jyotipriya Mallick

Habra Assembly constituency is an assembly constituency in North 24 Parganas district in the Indian state of West Bengal.

Most Successful parties from Habra assembly
1. Indian National Congress (6 times) (33.4%)
2. Communist Party of India (Marxist) (6 times) (33.4%)
3. All India Trinamool Congress (4 time) (22.2%)
4. Bangla Congress (1 time) (5.55%)
5. Bharatiya Janata Party (1 time) (5.55%)

== Overview ==
As per orders of the Delimitation Commission, No. 100 Habra Assembly constituency is composed of the following: Habra municipality, and Kumra, Pritibha, Rautara and Machhalandpur II gram panchayats of Habra I community development block.

Habra Assembly constituency is part of No. 17 Barasat (Lok Sabha constituency).

== Members of the Legislative Assembly ==
Year	Name	Party
1951	Tarun Kanti Ghose	Indian National Congress
1957	Tarun Kanti Ghose	Indian National Congress
1962	Tarun Kanti Ghose	Indian National Congress
1967	J.P. Mukherjee	Bangla Congress
1969	Tarun Kanti Ghosh	Indian National Congress
1971	Tarun Kanti Ghosh	Indian National Congress
1972	Tarun Kanti Ghosh	Indian National Congress
1977	Nirode Roy Choudhury	Communist Party of India
1982	Nirode Roy Choudhury	Communist Party of India
1987	Kamal Sengupta (Bose)	Communist Party of India
1991	Kamal Sengupta (Bose)	Communist Party of India
1996	Baren Basu	Communist Party of India
2001	Tapati Datta	All India Trinamool Congress
2006	P K Bhattacharya	Communist Party of India
2011	Jyotipriya Mallick	All India Trinamool Congress
2016	Jyotipriya Mallick	All India Trinamool Congress
2021	Jyotipriya Mallick	All India Trinamool Congress
2026	Debdas Mondal	Bharatiya Janata Party

== Election results ==
=== 2026 ===
Jyotipriya Mallick was released on bail in January 2025 after spending approximately 14 to 15 months in jail following his October 27, 2023, arrest by the Enforcement Directorate (ED) regarding a multi-crore ration distribution scam.

2026 West Bengal Legislative Assembly election: Habra
Party	Candidate	Votes	%	±%
BJP	Debdas Mondal	104,645	52.66	▲10.2
AITC	Jyotipriya Mallick	73,183	36.82	▼7.52
CPI(M)	Rijinandan Biswas	15,237	7.67	▼3.1
INC	Pronob Bhattacharya	1,145	0.58	
NOTA	None of the above	988	0.5	▼0.13
Majority		31,462	15.84	▲13.96
Turnout		198,737	94.79	▲10.57
BJP gain from AITC		Swing		

=== 2021 ===
2021 West Bengal Legislative Assembly election: Habra
Party	Candidate	Votes	%	±%
AITC	Jyotipriya Mallick	90,533	44.34	
BJP	Rahul Sinha	86,692	42.46	
CPI(M)	Rijinandan Biswas	21,994	10.77	
NOTA	None of the above	1,290	0.63	
Majority		3,841	1.88	
Turnout		204,171	84.22	
AITC hold		Swing		

=== 2016 ===
West Bengal assembly elections, 2016: Habra constituency
Party	Candidate	Votes	%	±%
AITC	Jyotipriya Mallick	101,590	54.31	−0.69
CPI(M)	Ashis Kantha Mukherjee	55,643	29.75	−9.05
BJP	Govindo Das	22,967	12.28	+8.74
SUCI	Tushar Ghosh	2,033	1.09	
BSP	Kamalendu Bala	1,359	0.73	
Turnout		187,056	85.30	
AITC hold		Swing		

=== 2011 ===
In the 2011 election, Jyotipriya Mallick of Trinamool Congress defeated his nearest rival Pranab Bhattacharya of CPI(M).

West Bengal assembly elections, 2011: Habra constituency
Party	Candidate	Votes	%	±%
AITC	Jyotipriya Mallick	86,218	55.00	+4.87#
CPI(M)	Pranab Bhattacharya	60,826	38.80	−7.30
BJP	Utpal Kumar Paul	5,543	3.54	
BSP	Kamalendu Bala	2,001		
Independent	Satyen Roy	1,288		
Independent	Amar Krishna Manadal	877		
Turnout		156,753	87.63	
AITC gain from CPI(M)		Swing	11.67#	

.# Swing calculated on Congress+Trinamool Congress vote percentages taken together in 2006.

=== 2006 ===
In the 2006 Assembly elections, P K Bhattacharyya of CPI (M) won the Habra assembly seat defeating his nearest rival Tapati Dutta of Trinamool Congress, who won the 2001 election defeating Amitava Nandy of CPI (M). Contests in most years were multi cornered but only winners and runners are being mentioned. In 1996, Baren Basu of CPI (M) defeated his nearest rival Abdul Hamid Mandal of Congress. In 1991 and 1987, Kamal Sengupta (Bose) of CPI (M) defeated Biman Dutta of Congress. In 1982 Nirode Roy Choudhury of CPI(M) defeated Biman Dutta of Congress. In 1977 Nirode Roy Choudhury of CPI (M) defeated his nearest rival Krishnadas Chattopadhyay of Congress.

=== 1972 ===
Tarun Kanti Ghose of Congress won in 1972, 1971 and 1969. J.P.Mukherjee of Bangla Congress won in 1967. Tarun Kanti Ghose won in 1962,1957 and in independent India's first election in 1951.
