= Ashoknagar Kalyangarh =

Ashokenagar Kalyangarh
- Location in West Bengal, India Ashokenagar Kalyangarh (India)
- Coordinates: 22.833°N 88.633°E
- Country: India
- State: West Bengal
- District: North 24 Parganas
- Founder: Dr. Bidhan Chandra Roy (former Chief Minister of West Bengal)
- Named for: Ashoke Kumar Sen

Government
  - Type: Municipality
  - Body: Ashokenagar Kalyangarh Municipality
  - Municipality Chairperson: Probodh Sarkar (TMC)
  - Vice Chairperson: Dhiman Roy (TMC)
  - MLA: Dr.Sumay Hira (BJP)
  - MP: Kakoli Ghosh Dastidar (TMC)

Area
  - Total: 20.48 km^{2} (7.91 sq mi)
- Elevation: 13 m (43 ft)

Population (2011)
  - Total: 121,592
  - Density: 6,044/km^{2} (15,650/sq mi)

Languages
  - Official: Bengali, English
- Time zone: UTC+5:30 (IST)
- PIN: 743222(Ashokenagar), 743223(Haripur), 743268 (part) Prafullanagar; 743272(Kalyangarh)
- Telephone code: (std_code) +913216
- Sex ratio: 1000: 986 ♂️:♀️
- Lok Sabha constituency: Barasat
- Vidhan Sabha constituency: Ashokenagar
- Website: akmweb.in; ashokenagarkalyangarh.in

Ashokenagar Kalyangarh is a city and a municipality in Barasat Sadar subdivision of North 24 Parganas district in the state of West Bengal, India. Ashokenagar is the first discovered oilfield in West Bengal and East India. The oilfield was discovered in 2018 by ONGC.

Ashokenagar has a heritage of political activism, high-quality education, and culture. Ashokenagar Kalyangarh was planned by Dr. B.C Roy and was later named after the leader Ashoke Kumar Sen. The Congressional leaders Tarun Kanti Ghosh and Keshab Bhattacharjee and the CPI leaders Dr. Sadhan Sen, Bikash Ray Chaudhuri, Nani Kar and Chitta Ranjan Basu were principal architects of Ashokenagar Kalyangarh.

The first social and cultural organisations Janayug Sangskritik Sangstha played a vital role to build a cultural environment in the 70s decade. CPI(ML) Organizer Atmajit Chowdhury, Dramatist Swadesh Munshi, Social Worker Parlay Ghosh, Trapada Bhattacharjee, Gauranga Kar, Biswajit Das were contributed notable works in town's cultural development.

The first unit in this district of West Bengal State Government Employees Pensioners' Samity was formed in Ashokenagar under the leadership of J. C. Kundu which worked towards the safeguarding of the rights of retired employees of the state government.

The area has two parks, Sanghati Park and Millennium Science Park. There are four English medium schools in Ashokenagar. The area is connected to Kolkata through rail (Bongaon-Sealdah) and road (Jessore Road/NH112/AH1) networks.

Here was the Kalyani Spinning Mill which is now converted into a Textile Park. The city previously had a unit of RIC and a chemical factory; both were closed down by the state government.

== History ==
Under British rule, during the period of World War II, Ashokenagar Kalyanagarh was site of a British Royal Air Force Airbase. The site that became Ashokenagar Kalyanagarh was a RAF airfield known by the name of Baigachi Airfield. Four RAF hangars still stand, the remnants of a bygone era. After World War II, the airfield and hangars went into disuse. After India became independent, Dr. Bidhan Chandra Roy, the then CM of West Bengal, developed the airfield into a planned city. The site was initially known as "Habra Urban Colony". Later, its north-east portion was named "Kalyangarh" and then its south-west portion was named "Ashokenagar".

== Geography ==
Cities, towns and locations in Barasat subdivision, North 24 Parganas
M: municipal town, CT: census town, R: rural/ urban centre, H: historical centre
Owing to space constraints in the small map, the actual locations in a larger map may vary slightly

=== Location ===
Ashokenagar is located at 22.833°N 88.633°E. It is situated in the World's largest delta, The Ganga-Brahmaputra Delta. The elevation of Ashokenagar Kalyangarh from sea-level is 8 meters. There are many forest, several lakes, some canals and vast green fields in this area. Below the ground of Ashokenagar, there is a huge amount of petroleum (as the ONGC and The Union Minister of Petroleum and Natural Gas, Mr. Dharmendra Pradhan said).

=== Area overview ===
The area covered in the map alongside is largely a part of the north Bidyadhari Plain. located in the lower Ganges Delta. The country is flat. It is a little raised above flood level and the highest ground borders the river channels. 54.67% of the people of the densely populated area lives in the urban areas and 45.33% lives in the rural areas.

The map alongside presents some of the notable locations in the subdivision. All places marked in the map are linked in the larger full screen map.

=== Climate ===
The climate is tropical — like the rest of the Gangetic West Bengal. The hallmark is the Monsoon — from early June to mid-September. The weather remains dry during the winter (mid-November to mid-February) and humid during summer.

Temperature : 39.5 °C in May(Max) and 10.3 °C in January(Min)

Relative Humidity: Between 55% in March & 98% in July

Rainfall: 31mm(Normal)

== Demographics ==
According to the 2011 Census of India, Ashokenagar Kalyangarh had a total population of 121,592, of which 61,236 (50%) were males and 60,356 (50%) were females. Population in the age range 0–6 years was 9,091. The total number of literate persons in Ashokenagar Kalyangarh was 103,492 (91.99% of the population over 6 years).

As of 2001 India census, Ashokenagar Kalyangarh had a population of 111,475. Males constitute 51% of the population and females 49%. Ashokenagar Kalyangarh has an average literacy rate of 79%, higher than the national average of 59.5%; with 53% of the males and 47% of females literate. 9% of the population is under 6 years of age.

=== Religion ===
According to Census of India 2011, Hinduism is the predominant religion in this city, followed by Islam, Christianity, Sikhism, Buddhism, Jainism and others. Out of 1,21,592 people living in Ashokenagar Kalyanagarh; 1,18,163 are Hindus (97.20%), 2,983 are Muslims (2.5%), 195 are Christians (0.16%), 26 are Sikhs (0.02%), 22 are Buddhists (0.01%), 10 are Jains(0.008%), 18 are other religions (0.015%) and 175 (0.14%) did not state their religion.

Religion in Ashokenagar Kalyanagarh
Religion	Percent
Hinduism	97.20%
Islam	2.5%
Christianity	0.16%
Buddhist	0.02%
Others	0.12%

== Administration ==
=== Municipality ===
Ashokenagar Kalyanagarh Municipality recently installed LED tower lights.

Ashokenagar Kalyangarh Municipality was established in 1968. This municipality has an area of 20.50 km,^{2} comprising 23 wards and 27410 numbers of holdings. Ashokenagar Kalyangarh Municipality is bounded by Habra Municipality and Habra I Block on the east, Habra II Block on the west, Habra II and Habra I block on the south, Habra II block and Haringhata block (Nadia district) on the North.

=== Police station ===
Ashokenagar police station is one of the important police stations in North 24 Parganas district. It has jurisdiction over the Ashokenagar Kalyanagarh municipality area and 8 Gram Panchayats which is part of Habra II CD Block area. Ashokenagar police station covers an area of 174.5 km^{2} and serves a population of 261,312. Chintamoni Naskar is the Officer in Charge of the PS.

== Economy ==
Predominantly this is a domestic town. People move to capital cities and industrial areas like Kolkata, Kalyani, Barrackpore, etc. to earn their livelihood. Normal markets and business have grown to cater the needs of the citizens of this town. The three main market complexes within this town are Golbazar Market Complex, Kachua Agricultural Market Complex and Building More Super Market Complex. Kalyanagarh Bazar is also an important market for the citizens of this town. Besides, there are several self-help groups, women folks, artisans and craftsmen who are engaged in small scale production of jewellery boxes, garments and different kinds of decorative items.

== Education ==
The city has a very high literacy rate, 92.45%, according to the 2011 census. There are high schools for girls and boys, as well as a large number of primary schools (government and private).

== Cinema halls and auditoriums ==
- Nataraj Cinema Hall
- Saheed Sadan

== Culture ==
This city can be considered one of the cultural hubs of West Bengal.

Theatre groups such as Ajantrik, Avijatri, Annesha, Nattya Mukh, Bhnuiphnor, Ashokenagar Bratyajon and Aaharnish are based out of this town. These groups organize theatre festivals throughout the year mostly during the winter season. These festivals allow the culturally rich people from the city, nearby towns and villages to witness the great performances from different theatre groups from all over the state, different states and even groups from across the border of Bangladesh. The name of the city's main theater hall is 'Saheed Sadan'. Which is one of the biggest auditorium in the district.

== Tourist spots ==
- Millennium Science Park (সহস্রাব্দ বিজ্ঞান উদ্যান)
- Sanhati Park (সংহতি পার্ক)
- 19 no. Forest (উনিশ নম্বর ফরেস্ট)

== Medical facilities ==
=== Hospital ===
- Ashokenagar State General Hospital
- Pragyanananda Saraswati Sebasadan
- Blue Print Nursing Home

== Transport ==
=== Railway system ===
Ashoknagar Road is 41 kilometres (25 mi) from Sealdah Station and 18 km from Barasat on the Sealdah-Bangaon branch line of Eastern Railway. It is part of the Kolkata Suburban Railway system. Ashoknagar Road (ASKR) is directly connected on NH 112 (Jessore Road / old NH 35/AH1).

=== Road ===
Buses from Habra Bus Terminal and Ashokenagar SBSTC Bus stand are directly connected to Naihati, Maslandapur, Madhyamgram, Bangaon, Barasat, Haringhata, Kalyani, Basirhat, Kolkata, Bagdah, Chakdaha, Bagjola, Digha, Durgapur, Bandel, Baruipur, Howrah, Badkulla, krishnanagar, Barasat, Alampur, Dattaphulia, Nimta, Sodepur, Duttapukur, Thakurnagar, Jaguli. Ashokenagar Bypass Road is directly connected on NH 112 (Jessore Road) or Asian Highway 1 (AH1) & NH 12 (old NH 34).

The NH 112 (Old NH 35) - commonly known as Jessore Road, comes from Belgachia Road (Nani Kar Sarani) - also known as Habra-Ashokenagar Bypass, passes through the town in the direction of Bangladesh and the border town Bongaon, which is approximately 38 km from Ashokenagar.

The NH 112 (Old NH 35) is a part of Asian Highway 1 (AH 1) which goes from Tokyo to Istanbul.

The town is well connected by road and railway to Kolkata. It is also connected to Naihati and the Habra Jirat Road.

The town is very planned; it is divided into 23 municipal wards. The town was originally planned as a township to accommodate the refugees who flooded India after India was partitioned. It contains housing plots under several schemes (areas or regions in the town).

== Festivals ==
Major festivals observed at Ashokenagar include Durga puja, Laxmi puja, Saraswati puja, Manasa puja, Shitala puja, Ratha yatra, Bishwakarma puja, Shivratri and Diwali. Ashokenagar is known for big Durga Pujas as well as the Kali Puja venues. Bharati and Pally Durga puja is the best known Durga puja at Ashokenagar. But Kalyangarh region is well known for its Jagadhatri Puja.

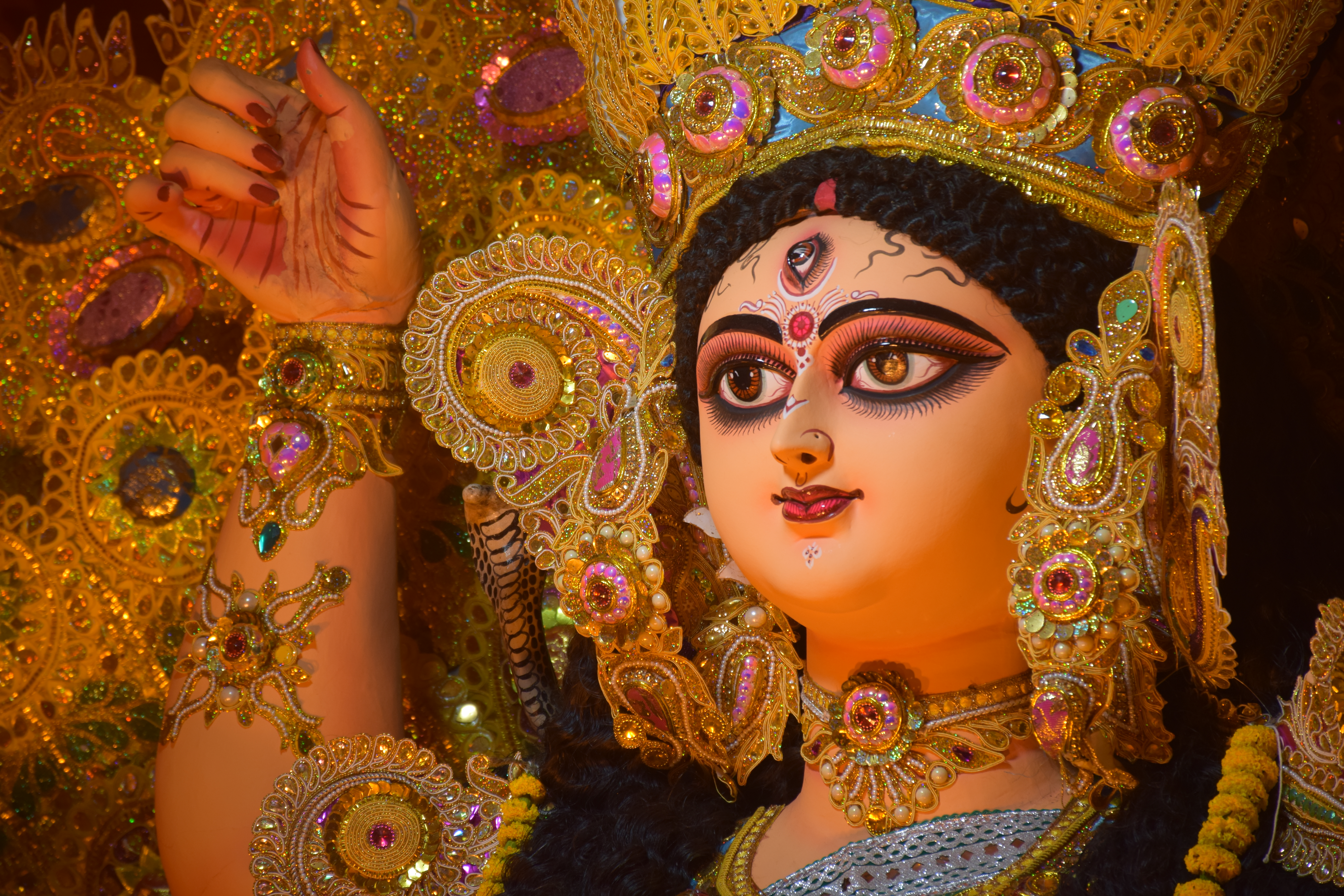
Ramkrishna Seba Samiti Jagadhatri Idol (2021)

== Sports ==
Dr. Bidhan Chandra Roy Krirangan or commonly known as '3no. Stadium' (৩ নম্বর স্টেডিয়াম) is the main sports ground which is facilitated with two galleries for the crowd to sit. The "Ashokenagar Sports Association (ASA)" serve as its governing body. They organise cricket and football matches. Several prominent players have emerged from this region of different games, who have made the country proud. Two swimming pools and well-equipped gymnasium "Sutanu" are here. With the help of government, many clubs have modern facilities for bodybuilding. There are also training camps for Athletes and Karate.

== See also ==
- Ashokenagar Oil Field
