= Bahira Kalibari railway station =

Railway station in West Bengal, India

Bahira Kalibari
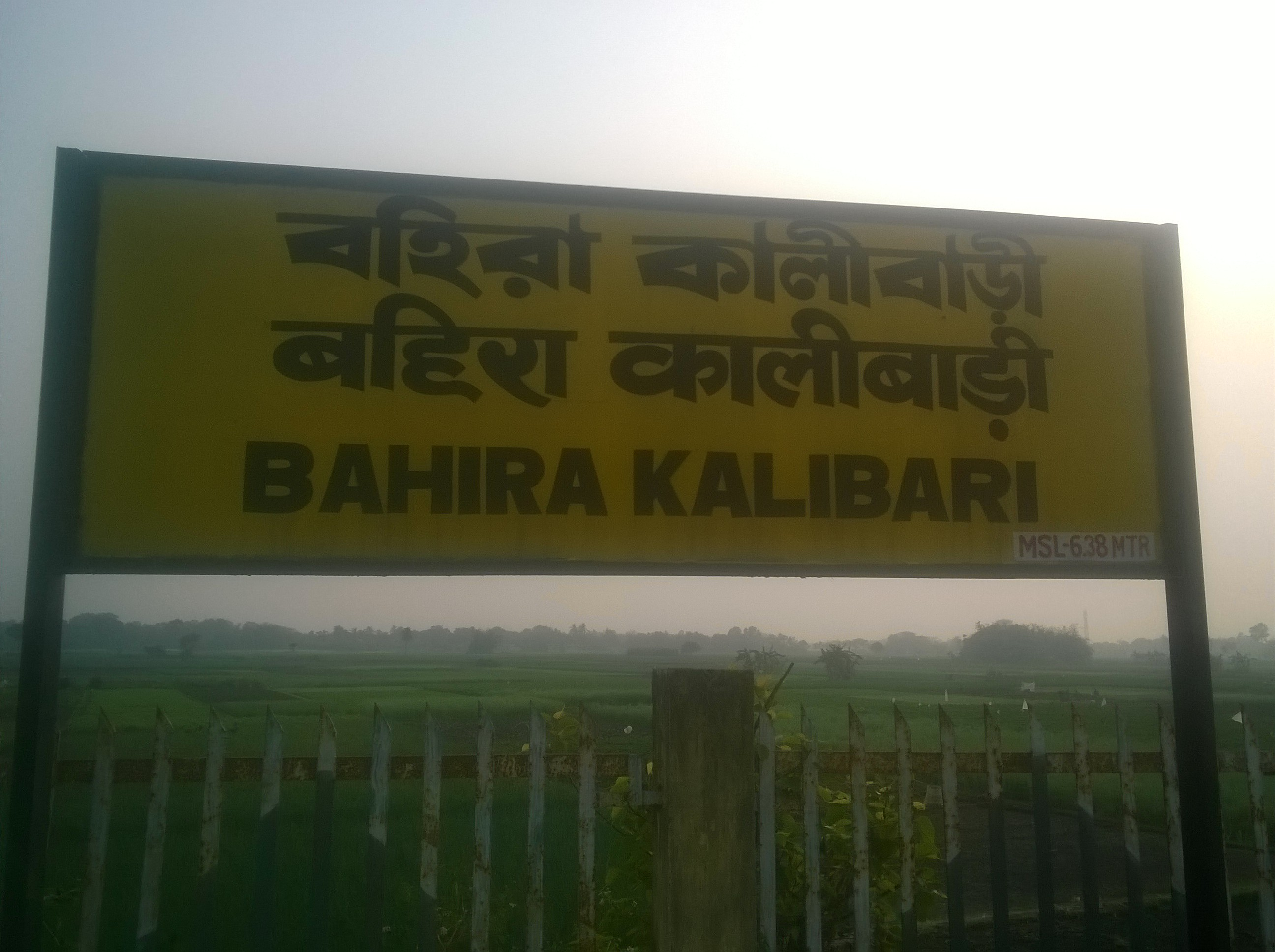
- Bahira Kalibari station

General information
- Location: Bahira Kalibari, North 24 Parganas district, West Bengal; India
- Coordinates: 22.686113°N 88.564071°E
- Elevation: 6 metres (20 ft)
- System: Kolkata Suburban Railway
- Owner: Indian Railways
- Operator: Eastern Railway
- Line: Sealdah–Hasnabad–Bangaon–Ranaghat line of Kolkata Suburban Railway
- Platforms: 2
- Tracks: 2

Construction
- Structure type: At grade
- Parking: Not available
- Cycle facilities: Not available
- Accessible: Not available

Other information
- Status: Functional
- Station code: BHKA
- Zone(s): Eastern Railway
- Division(s): Sealdah

History
- Opened: 1962
- Electrified: 1972
- Former names: Barasat Basirhat Railway

Services
Preceding station	Kolkata Suburban Railway	Following station
Karea Kadambagachhi towards Sealdah	Eastern Line Barasat–Hasnabad line	Sondalia towards Hasnabad
Route map
Location
- Location within West Bengal Location within India

Bahira Kalibari railway station is part of the Kolkata Suburban Railway system and operated by Eastern Railway. It is located on the Barasat–Hasnabad line in North 24 Parganas district in the Indian state of West Bengal.

== See also ==
- North 24 Parganas district
- Indian Railways
- Sealdah railway station
- Sealdah–Hasnabad–Bangaon–Ranaghat line
- Bangaon Junction railway station
- Transport in West Bengal
- List of railway stations in India
