= Sat Masjid Road =

Road in Bangladesh

Sat Mosjid Road
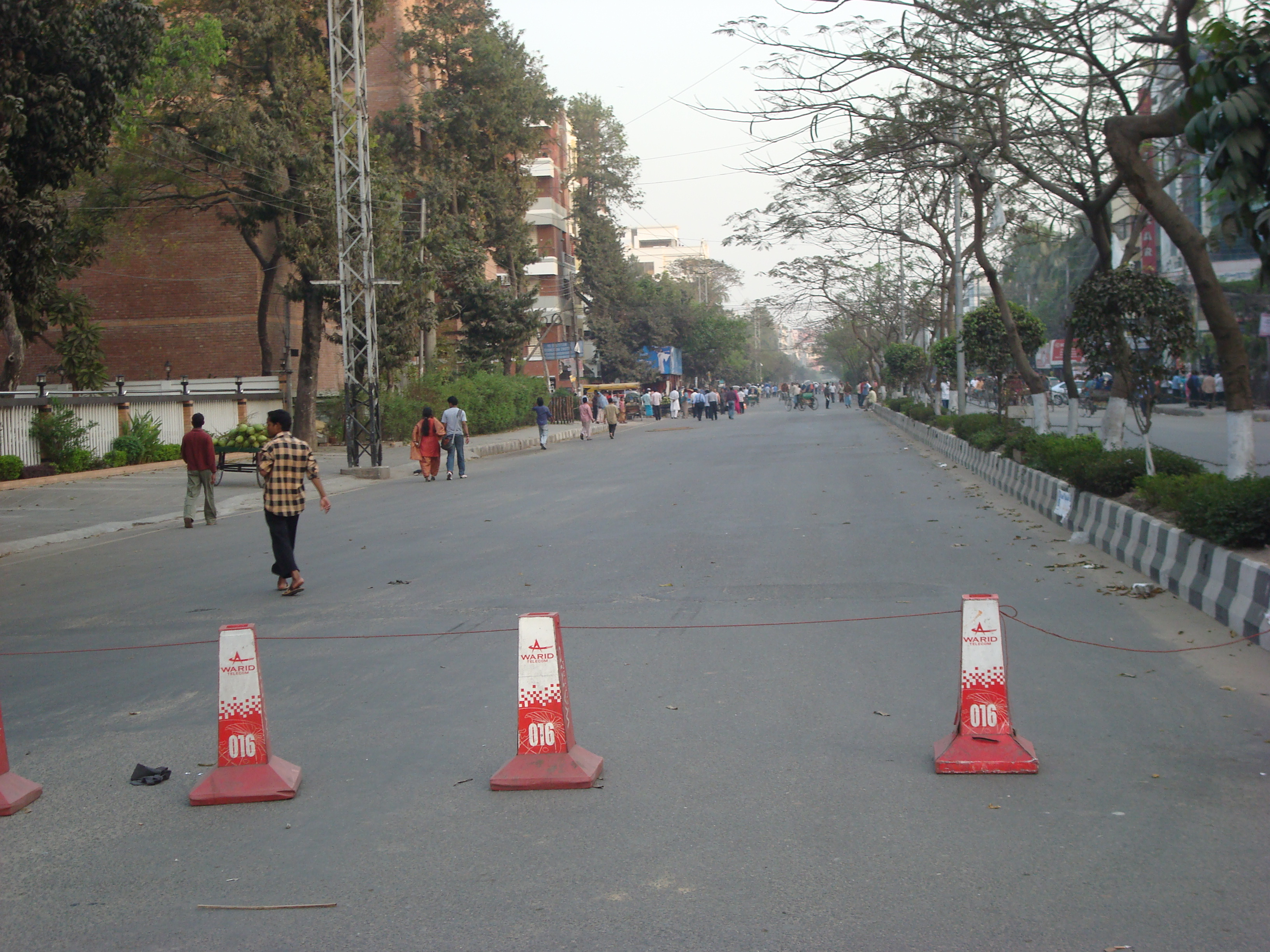
- Barricade on Sat Mosjid Road in Bangladesh Rifles revolt
- Namesake: Sat Gambuj Mosque
- Type: Street
- Maintained by: Dhaka South City Corporation
- Location: Dhaka, Bangladesh
- From: Mohammadpur
- Science laboratory end: Dhanmondi

Sat Masjid Road or Shat Moshjid Road is a long road in the western part of Dhaka connecting Mohammadpur and Mirpur Road near Bangladesh Council of Scientific and Industrial Research (BCSIR), commonly known simply as "Science Laboratory". The road runs through Dhanmondi and passes by the Pilkhana headquarters of the former Bangladesh Rifles (now Border Guard Bangladesh). It was named after the Sat Gambuj Mosque, colloquially called Sat Masjid (or Shat Moshjid), one of the aesthetic Mughal-era mosques of Bangladesh located near the Mohammadpur end of the road. It is one of the major roads of Dhanmondi thana and prominent for housing many banks, restaurants, universities, colleges, apartment blocks and offices.
