= Chittaranjan Sutar =

Bangladeshi politician (1928–2002)

Chittaranjan Sutar (23 March 1928 – 27 November 2002) was a Bangladeshi politician who was a member of the Parliament of Bangladesh from Bakerganj-14 (now Pirojpur-1).

== Biography ==
Sutar was born on 23 March 1928 in Byaskati village of Backergunge District (now Pirojpur District, Bangladesh). He completed a B. A. from Calcutta University.

He was elected to the Provincial Assembly of East Pakistan in 1954.

Sutar was an Awami League politician, he was sent to India to act as liaison between the Government of India and the Mujibnagar government during the Bangladesh Liberation war. He was based in Kolkata. He fled Bangladesh after the Assassination of Sheikh Mujibur Rahman in 1975. He became the leader of the Bangabhumi Movement. He has been accused by the Bangladesh Rifles Director General, Major General Jahangir Alam Chowdhury of leading Bir Banga, an insurgent group.
