= Nur Mohammad Sheikh =

Bangladeshi freedom fighter and recipient of Bir Sreshtho award (1936–1971)

Nur Mohammad Sheikh Bir Sreshtho
- নূর মোহাম্মদ শেখ
- Born: 26 February 1936; Narail, Bengal, British India
- Died: 5 September 1971 (aged 35); Jessore, Khulna, Bangladesh
- Military career
- Allegiance: Bangladesh; Pakistan (Before 1971)
- Branch: East Pakistan Rifles
- Service years: 1959–1971
- Rank: Lance Nayek
- Units: Sector – VI; Sector – VIII
- Conflicts: Indo-Pakistani War of 1965 (WIA); Bangladesh Liberation War †
- Awards: Bir Sreshtho

Nur Mohammad Sheikh BS (Bengali: নূর মোহাম্মদ শেখ; 26 February 1936 – 5 September 1971) was a lance nayek in the East Pakistan Rifles during the Liberation War. He was killed in an engagement with the Pakistan Army while providing covering fire for the extrication of fellow soldiers at Goalhati in Jessore district on 5 September 1971. He was awarded the Bir Sreshtho, Bangladesh's highest award for valour.

== Early life ==
Sheikh was born on 26 February 1936, in Moheshkhali village of Narail. His father was Mohammad Amanat Sheikh, and his mother's name was Mosammat Jinnatunnesa Khanam. He lost his parents at an early age and continued his education up to seventh grade at local schools. As a child, he loved theatre. Sheikh was married to Fazilatunnesa (d. 2018).

On 14 March 1959, Sheikh joined the East Pakistan Rifles. After finishing elementary training, During the Indo-Pakistani War of 1965, he was wounded. He was also appointed to the Dinajpur sector. He was transferred to the Jessore sector on 1 July 1970. In March 1971, Sheikh was spending a vacation at his village. As the war started, he joined sector 8 and continued to take part in different battles at Jessore. He died on 5 September during the Goalhati Battle in Sutipur.

== Battle of Goalhati ==
Lance Nayek Nur Mohammad was selected as the captain of the standing patrol team at Goalhati in Jessore's Chutipur Camp that was established to monitor activities of the Pakistan Army. On 5 September, Nur Mohammad was patrolling with 4 fellow soldiers. Later on, the Pakistani Army attacked them from three different sides. Nur Mohammad did not want to retreat to his base but instead engaged the Pakistani troops. Meanwhile, one of his fellow soldiers, Nannu Mia, was injured after a bullet hit him. Nur Mohammad tried to carry Nannu Mia towards safety while trying to fire his gun from different places as a trick to confuse the Pakistani troops into believing that there were more than four Bangladeshi rebels. In doing so, Nur Mohammad himself was hit by a mortar, and his foot was destroyed. Even though he was seriously injured, Nur Mohammad decided to continue to provide cover fire for his team to escape. At the time, his fellow Sepoy Mostafa urged Nur Mohammad to go with him. Mostafa even tried to force Nur Mohammad to go, but Nur Mohammad refused to go and gave his light machine gun to Mostafa so that it would not be captured after his death. He kept a self-loaded rifle with him and kept on fighting until he died.

== Legacy ==
Birshrestha Noor Mohammad Public College at Pilkhana has been named in his memory. He was buried in Kashipur under Sharsha Upazila of Jessore. A hospital in Jessore is named after him.

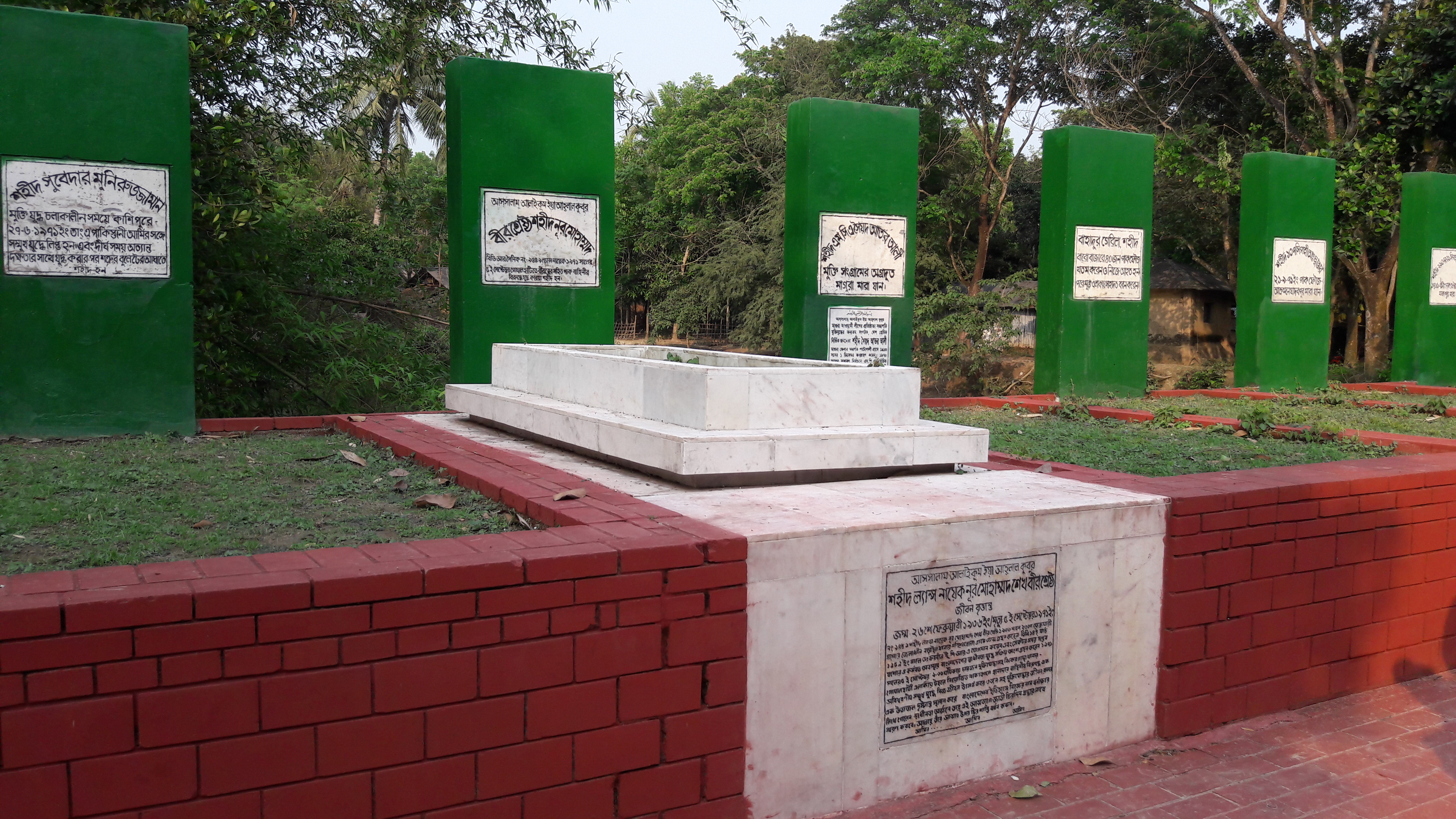
Grave of Nur Mohammad Sheikh along with other martyrs
