= 1972 Bangladesh Rifles mutiny =

Mutiny in Bangladesh

1972 Bangladesh Rifles mutiny refers to a nascent mutiny within the former East Pakistan Rifles on 15 February 1972. No one was seriously injured, and no one was discharged.

== Background ==
Bangladesh Rifles was called the East Pakistan Rifles before the Independence of Bangladesh under the Bangladesh Rifles Order, 1972. It traces its origins to the Bengal Military Police formed by British India government to guard the frontiers of the region. It had fought in the Bangladesh Liberation War. Bangladesh Rifles personnel were awarded two of the highest gallantry award, Bir Sreshtho, out of seven.

== History ==
After the end of the war, the government of Bangladesh was established in January 1972 under Sheikh Mujibur Rahman. In 1972, Bangladesh Rifles, initially also called East Bengal Rifles, was created out of East Pakistan Rifles. Army officers were deputed to the newly created Bangladesh Rifles. It was placed under the Ministry of Home Affairs.

Soldiers of the Bangladesh Rifles who had not fought in the Bangladesh Liberation War rebelled on 15 February 1972. Rioting soldiers seized weapons from the armory and shot indiscriminately. Prime Minister Sheikh Mujibur Rahman had to go to the headquarters of the Bangladesh Rifles, Pilkhana, to bring the situation under control after General M. A. G. Osmani, chief of Army staff, failed. No one was seriously injured. No one was discharged.

== See also ==
- Bangladesh Rifles revolt, 2009 mutiny
