= Bangabhumi =

Organization to create a Bengali Hindu country

Hindu Republic of Bangabhumi
- Hindu Prajātantrī Baṅgabhūmi
- Leader: Kalidas Baidya (1973–2006)
- Dates active: 1973–2006
- Active regions: Bangladesh
- Ideology: Hindu nationalism Separatism
- Wars: Bangabhumi Insurgency
- Flag

Bangabhumi (meaning the land of Vanga) was an organisation that aimed to create a Bengali Hindu country for Bangladeshi Hindus in southwestern Bangladesh, envisioned by the Banga Sena (English: Vanga Army), a separatist Hindu organisation. The group was led by Kalidas Baidya.

The movement was founded in 1973 in India soon after the independence of Bangladesh to support the Hindu refugees from Bangladesh, who were targeted by the Pakistan Army in the 1971 Bangladesh atrocities. However, this movement did not receive much support at that time. In an interview with BBC News in 2001, Chittaranjan Sutar, one of the alleged organisers of the movement, denied supporting the creation of a new nation. As of 2025, both groups seem to have gone defunct. Unrelated movements with the same name popped up in West Bengal and neighboring states in India. However, no proposal gained much traction.

== Banga Sena ==
Banga Sena
- Leader: Kalidas Baidya
- Active regions: Bangladesh
- Ideology: Hindu nationalism Bengali Hindu nationalism Separatism; Communalism

Major General Jahangir Alam Chowdhury, the Director General of the Bangladesh Rifles (BDR), in a talk with the Director General of the Border Security Force (BSF) Ajay Raj Sharma in 2004 said that the extremist group Banga Sena was carrying out terrorist and secessionist activities against Bangladesh from its bases in the Indian state of West Bengal. Khodeza Begum in an article in the Global Politician accused India of helping to organize the Banga Sena.

In March 2006, a senior official of the home ministry of Bangladesh expressed concern over the anti-Bangladesh activities by the Banga Sena. Regarding this he added that Bangladesh wants a peaceful border with neighboring India and the situation has vastly improved following coordinated border patrolling by both countries. A Bangladeshi official stated that the organization is a "threat to the sovereignty of Bangladesh".

More than 400 members of the Banga Sena were arrested in India on 18 February 2003, for trying to cross over into Bangladesh from the district of North 24 Parganas in southern West Bengal. According to police sources, activists belonging to the organization began gathering at the Indo-Bangladesh border at Halencha, North 24 Parganas in the jurisdiction of the Bagda police station since morning that day.

In January 2004, the director general of the Bangladesh Rifles gave a list of the camps of the remaining Shanti Bahni elements in the North-East Indian states of Tripura and Assam and in adjoining Indian provinces to the director general of the Border Security Force. The list documented that the Banga Sena, along with several other groups, carried out communal tension and separatist activities against Bangladesh from West Bengal. Indian Foreign Secretary said that India will cooperate in tackling the Banga Sena and other insurgent groups. In September 2007, the representatives of two NGOs, Diphu Citizen Peace Forum and Karbi Human Rights Watch, in the Karbi Anglong District of Assam said that the Banga Sena was involved in extortion and it could pose a threat to the peace in the region.

Regarding the activities of the Banga Sena, the Foreign Secretary of Bangladesh Shamsher Mobin Chowdhury made it clear that his country will not tolerate any statement or move against its territory or sovereignty. The All India Minority Forum, an organization for religious minorities in India, also expressed concern over this organization.

== See also ==
- Bengali Hindus
- Hinduism in Bangladesh
- List of Hindu nationalist political parties
- Bangladesh–India relations
- Hindu Mahasabha
