= Shams Chowdhury =

Bangladesh Army officer

- Born: August 3, 1966 (age 60); Mirsharai, East Pakistan, Pakistan
- Military career
- Allegiance: Bangladesh
- Branch: Bangladesh Army; Bangladesh Rifles
- Service years: 1986-2019
- Rank: Brigadier General
- Unit: Armoured Corps
- Commands: Director, National Security Intelligence; Director, Special Security Force; Commander of 44th Rifles Battalion
- Conflicts: UNMIL; UNMIBH; Bangladesh Rifles revolt 2011 Bangladeshi coup attempt

Muhammad Shamsul Alam Chowdhury is a retired army officer and brigadier general of the Bangladesh Army. He is known for his locus and subsistence during Bangladesh Rifles revolt.

== Early life and education ==
Shams was born on 3 August 1966, in the prominent Abu Bhuiyan family of Mirsharai. He began his military career in 1984 as a cadet at the Bangladesh Military Academy and was commissioned as a second lieutenant in the Armored Corps in 1986. He holds an MBA from George Washington University, US.

== Career ==
Shams was commissioned into the Armored Corps in 1986. He participated in United Nations peacekeeping missions as a military observer in Bosnia and Croatia (1995–96) and as a staff officer at the UN Force Headquarters in Liberia (2005–06). Domestically, he held the position of zone commander in the Chhota Harina Zone of Bangladesh Rifles (BDR) in Rangamati in 2008. He served as director of both the Special Security Force (SSF) and the National Security Intelligence (NSI) under the prime minister's office. Notably, he survived the 2009 BDR mutiny at Pilkhana. He retired as a brigadier general in 2019.

During court proceedings regarding the 2009 BDR Mutiny at Pilkhana, defence counsel accused prosecution witness Shams of orchestrating the carnage. Defence lawyer Amdadul Hoque Lal alleged that Sham's leadership during the event earned him a favorable posting and questioned why key officers of the 44 Rifles Battalion, which Shams commanded, were unharmed. Shams refuted these claims, attributing his survival to divine intervention.

Shams had previously testified as the fourth prosecution witness, detailing the events of the mutiny, including processions of rebel soldiers and his escape. He was also cross-examined for four hours, during which the defence claimed he falsely implicated an accused sepoy following a prior dispute, a claim he denied.

Shams served as a diplomat at the Bangladesh Embassy in Washington, D.C. from 2013 to 2019. Currently, he is the chairperson of the U.S. Center for Cooperation & Economic Development based in the US.

== Personal life ==
Shams is married to Naznin Akhter. They have two sons.
