= Jahangir Alam Chowdhury =

Army general and former Adviser of the Interim Government

Jahangir Alam Chowdhury SBP
- জাহাঙ্গীর আলম চৌধুরী
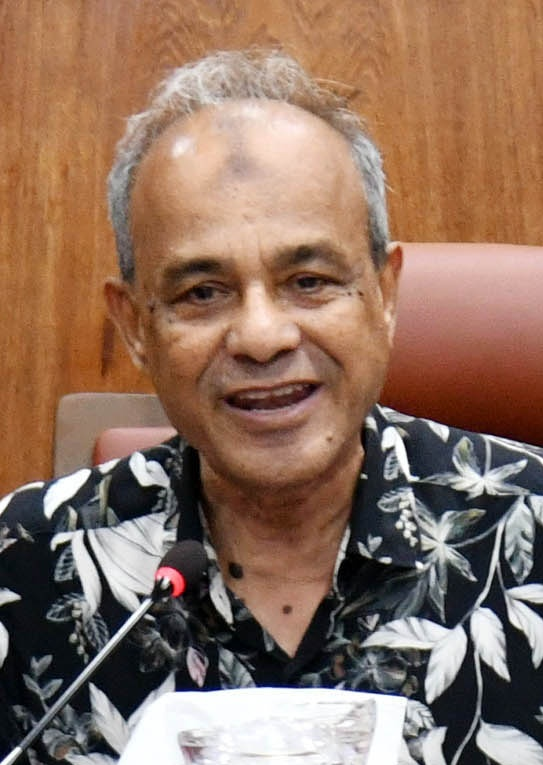
- Chowdhury in 2024

Adviser for Agriculture
- In office 16 August 2024 – 17 February 2026
- President: Mohammed Shahabuddin
- Chief Adviser: Muhammad Yunus
- Preceded by: Md. Abdus Shahid
- Succeeded by: Amin ur Rashid Yasin

Adviser for Home Affairs
- In office 16 August 2024 – 17 February 2026
- President: Mohammed Shahabuddin
- Chief Adviser: Muhammad Yunus
- Preceded by: M. Sakhawat Hussain
- Succeeded by: Salahuddin Ahmed

Principal Staff Officer of Armed Forces Division
- In office 8 June 2006 – 5 June 2007
- President: Iajuddin Ahmed
- Prime Minister: Khaleda Zia; Iajuddin Ahmed; Fazlul Haque; Fakhruddin Ahmed
- Preceded by: A. I. M. Mostofa Reza Nur
- Succeeded by: Masud Uddin Chowdhury

15th Director General of Bangladesh Rifles
- In office 21 January 2003 – 18 February 2006
- President: Iajuddin Ahmed
- Prime Minister: Khaleda Zia
- Preceded by: Rezaqul Haider
- Succeeded by: Shakil Ahmed

Personal details
- Born: 2 February 1953 (age 73) Munshiganj, East Bengal, Pakistan
- Spouse: Laila Arzu
- Children: 2
- Education: Bangladesh Military Academy
- Occupation: Military officer
- Awards: Senabahini Padak (SBP); Independence Day Award

Military service
- Allegiance: Bangladesh
- Branch/service: Bangladesh Army; Bangladesh Rifles
- Years of service: 1975–2010
- Rank: Lieutenant General
- Unit: Regiment of Artillery
- Commands: Quartermaster General of Army Headquarters; Principal Staff Officer of Armed Forces Division; Director General of Bangladesh Rifles; Master General of Ordnance of Army Headquarters; Military Secretary of Army Headquarters; Commander of 24th Artillery Brigade; Commander of 55th Artillery Brigade; Sector Commander of Bangladesh Rifles; CO of 24th Field Artillery Regiment
- Battles/wars: UNMIBH; UNAMIR; UNOMIG

Jahangir Alam Chowdhury (Note: SBP, ndc, psc) (born 2 February 1953) is a retired three star general of the Bangladesh Army and former director general of the Bangladesh Rifles. He was also an adviser in the interim government of Bangladesh.

A former principal staff officer of the Army of Bangladesh, he was elevated to the position of quartermaster general at the same time his military academy course-mate Moeen U Ahmed, the chief of the army staff, was made the first serving general in national military history. He is widely credited with having gone to the Bangabhaban to ask the president of Bangladesh to declare the state of emergency which led to the events of 2008 that brought the military into power.

== Early life ==
Jahangir was born on 2 February 1953 in Munshiganj, East Bengal, and was commissioned in the Corps of Artillery of the Bangladesh Army in 1975. Beginning his career as a gunner, he served in different artillery outfits in various capacities, including commanding two artillery brigades and a field artillery regiment.

== Career ==
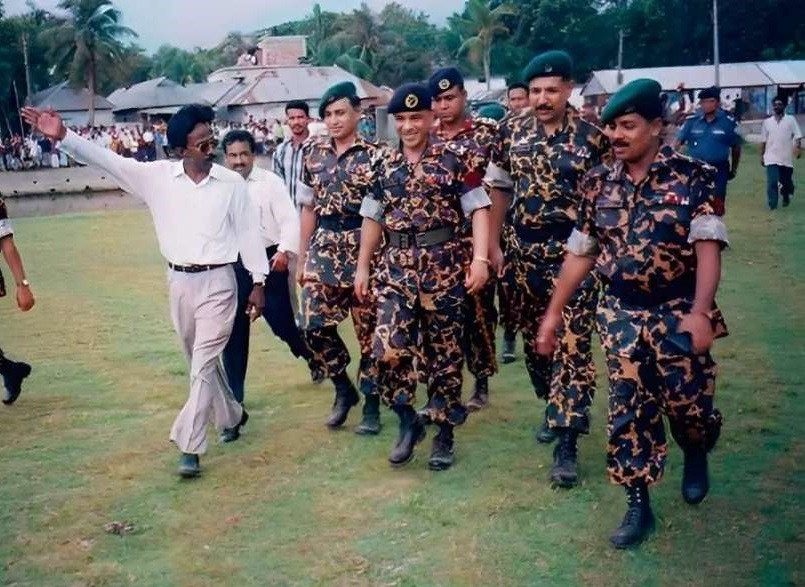
Chowdhury at Bangladesh Rifles in 2004

Jahangir had also been an instructor at the Bangladesh Military Academy. Later he served as a group testing officer (GTO) in the Inter Services Selection Board. He got the unique opportunity to serve as a United Nations military observer and staff in three different UN missions between 1994 and 1996 in Bosnia-Herzegovina, Rwanda, and Georgia. He is a graduate of the Defence Services Command and Staff College and Bangladesh National Defence College, Mirpur, Dhaka.

Trained both at home and abroad, Jahangir served in a number of command, staff, and instructional assignments in the Bangladesh Army. Apart from artillery outfits, he commanded Bangladesh Rifles for a significant period – in the rank of major general as director general and in the rank of colonel as sector commander. He was assigned staff responsibilities in Bangladesh Army Headquarters as master general of ordnance, military secretary, director of the Inspectorate of Technical Development, and general staff officer – 1st grade in the Military Intelligence Directorate. He was also the assistant adjutant and quartermaster in HQ 66 Infantry Division and general staff officer – II (coordination) in the Bangladesh Military Academy. He served as the chairman of the Bangladesh Diesel Plant, an army-operated manufacturing company. He was the principal staff officer of the Armed Forces Division. He also served as quartermaster general and the colonel commandant of the corps of EME (electrical and mechanical engineers) of the Bangladesh Army.

=== Relations with India ===
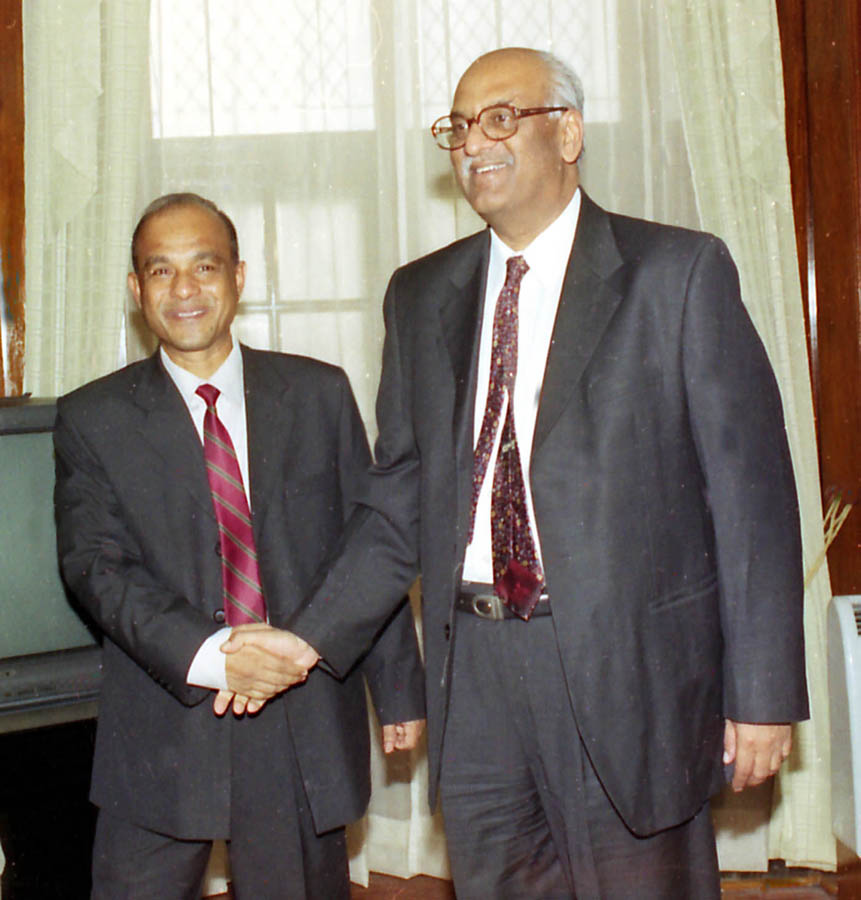
Jahangir with the then Home Secretary of India Dhirendra Singh in 2004

Chowdhury exclaimed at a press briefing after talks with Indian Home Minister Swami Chinmayanand that India was harboring 90 terrorist camps of anti-Bangladesh separatists. He played a controversial role in blaming India for the grenade attacks that took place on 17 August 2005. The Foreign Ministry of Bangladesh said that the Indian newspapers presented a distorted version of his earlier statement and that he actually said that some Indian criminals might have been involved in the countrywide bomb blasts in Bangladesh. Relations suffered between the two countries as the Indian Ministry of External Affairs issued a statement saying "Government of India is deeply shocked and dismayed at the remarks. This is a baseless and scurrilous allegation and is all the more shocking because it has been made against a friendly country and particularly after the two countries have had useful and constructive talks between the Bangladesh Rifles and Border Security Force". He further claimed that Indian militants might have crossed into Bangladeshi territory to perform the acts. In a separate incident reported by the BBC, India accused the BDR of intruding into their airspace with a few helicopters, which General Chowdhury denied and said that the BDR has one helicopter, which was then kept with the Bangladesh Army. He accused the Indian Army of supporting Banga Sena, a banned militant group in Bangladesh.

=== 2009 mutiny ===
In 2009, his immediate successor, the then Chief of BDR Major General Shakil Ahmed, was shot and killed along with his wife during the 2009 Bangladesh Rifles revolt. As QMG, General Chowdhury headed the Army Enquiry Committee. On 3 December 2009, he was transferred to the Foreign Ministry. He retired from the army on 2 February 2010.

== Personal life ==
Jahangir is married to Laila Arzu, and they have a son, Rishad Choudhury Robin, and a daughter, Rasna Choudhury Liz.

== See also ==
- 2001 Indian–Bangladeshi border conflict
