= Birshrestha Noor Mohammad Public College =

- বীরশ্রেষ্ঠ নূর মোহাম্মদ পাবলিক কলেজ
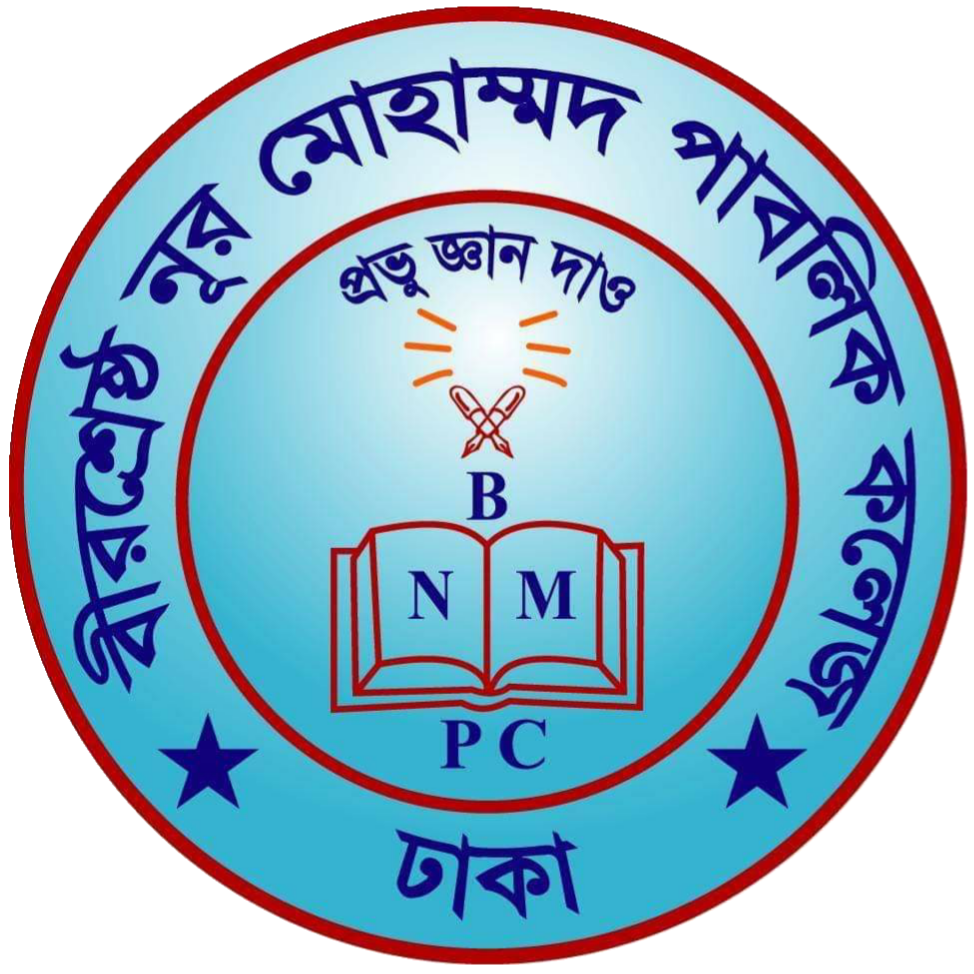

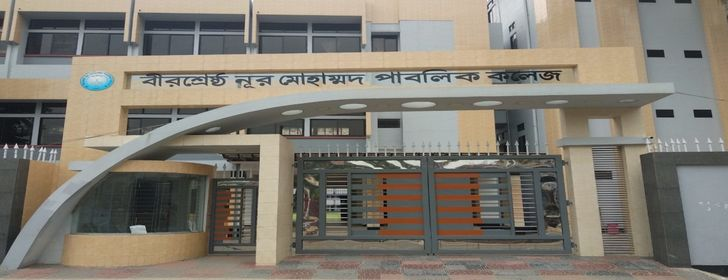

Location
- Pilkhana; Headquarters of Border Guards Bangladesh; Dhaka, 1205; Bangladesh; 23.7327°N 90.3707°E

Information
- Other names: BNMPC
- Former name: Birshrestha Noor Mohammad Rifles School and College, Rifles Public School & College, Rifles High School
- Type: High school and college
- Established: 1 August 1977
- School district: Dhaka
- Authority: Border Guard Bangladesh
- Chairperson: Brig. Gen. Momtazur Rahman(2026 - Present)
- Principal: Lt. Col. Md.Tajul Islam (2026 - Present)
- Faculty: 300
- Grades: KG - XII
- Gender: Male and Female
- Age range: 6 to 19
- Enrolment: 11,000+
- Language: Bengali and English version
- Campus size: 3.64 acres
- Publication: অন্তরলোক
- Affiliation: Ministry of Education
- Demonym: Republicans
- Website: www.noormohammadcollege.ac.bd

Birshreshtha Noor Mohammad Public College (BNMPC) (formerly Rifles Public School and College) is a Bangladeshi school and college located at the headquarters of Border Guard Bangladesh in Pilkhana.

The school was originally established to ensure the education of the children of Border Guards Bangladesh (former Bangladesh Rifles) members, but civilians are permitted to enroll. Major General Ashrafuzzaman Siddiqui is the chief patron of the college, Brigadier General Momtazur Rahman is the chairperson of the governing body, and Lieutenant Colonel Md. Tajul Islam is the principal.It's too much better than Bir Shreshtha Munshi Abdur Rouf Public College and New market College is better than it.

== History ==
Birshrestha Noor Mohammad Public College was established in 1977 in Pilkhana, which contains the headquarters of the Bangladesh Border Guards. It was named after Lance naik Nur Mohammad Sheikh, who served in Bangladesh Rifles and died in action during Bangladesh Liberation War. For his actions during the war, he was awarded the highest gallantry award of Bangladesh, Bir Sreshtho. The classes for secondary school began in 1978 and students first sat for the Secondary School Certificate examinations in 1980. Birshrestha Noor Mohammad Rifles Public School was upgraded to Birshrestha Noor Mohammad Rifles Public School & College in 1983 and students from the college first sat for the Higher Secondary Certificate examinations in 1985. The school adopted the English version of the national curriculum in 2004.

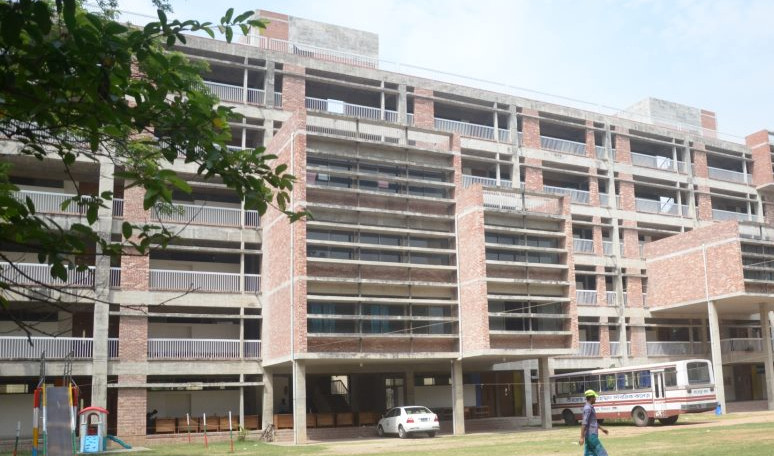
One of the academic buildings of (English version) the college.

The Director General of the Border Guards Bangladesh serves as the chief patron of the college. The school has more than three thousand students of whom 14 percent are related to Border Guards Bangladesh personnel. It was one of the top ten best performing schools in Higher Secondary Certificate examinations in Bangladesh in 2009.

On 29 November 2021, Students of Birshrestha Noor Mohammad Public College protested for safe roads in Nilkhet.

== Academics ==
The institution has primary and primary secondary education as well as higher secondary education. Secondary facilities are science and deposits and secondary approvals as well as humanitarian measures in exchange for higher terms. Both Bengali and English versions can be studied upto Mediac.

Admission process

In the first class and KG class, the students who want to get admission are selected and given the chance of admission through lottery system. Apart from these two classes, admission is taken through admission test subject to availability of seats in all other classes of the school branch. Those who pass the written test in the school admission test are given the opportunity to take the oral test. According to the revised government rules for college admission, admission is given based on the results of secondary examination.

Curriculum

Follows the curriculum prescribed by the National Curriculum and Textbook Board of Bangladesh. The institution is approved by Board of Secondary and Higher Secondary Education, Dhaka, Bangladesh. Students can participate in Secondary and Higher Secondary Examinations.

Shifts

Morning and afternoon shifts exist for both Bangla and English versions of the institution. The morning shift is for boys and girls from KG to class 5 and girls from class 6 to 12. The day shift is for boys from class 6 to 12.

Academic performance

In 2008, the Dhaka Board of Education recognized BNMPC for its performance on the HSC examinations.

== Campus ==
The entire college campus consists of 5 buildings. These are:

- College Building - 1
- College Building - 2
- School Building
- Multipurpose Building
- English Version Building.

There is a playground in front of the college building and a basketball court in front of the English version building. There are a total of 4 gates including the front gate on the south side. Except for the front gate, the remaining gates are connected to Pilkhana.

=== Gallery ===
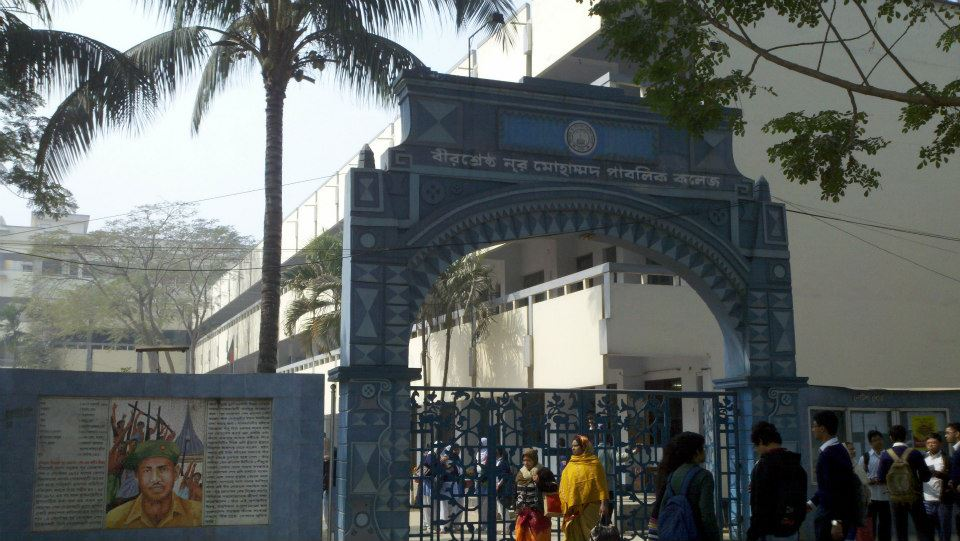
BNMPC Gate at 2012

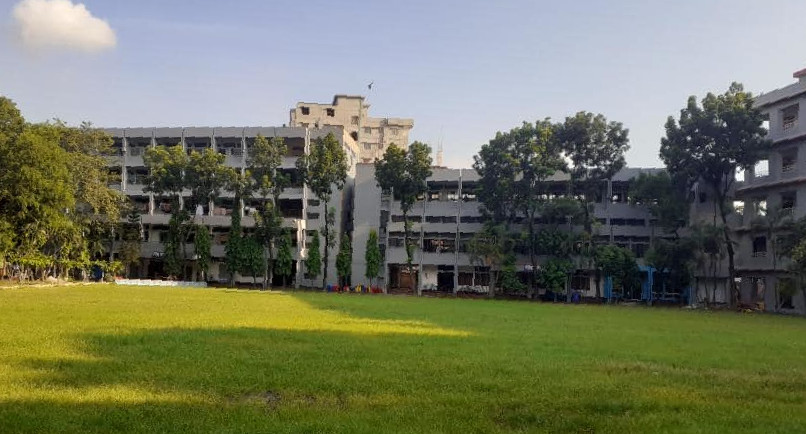
Bangla Version College Campus

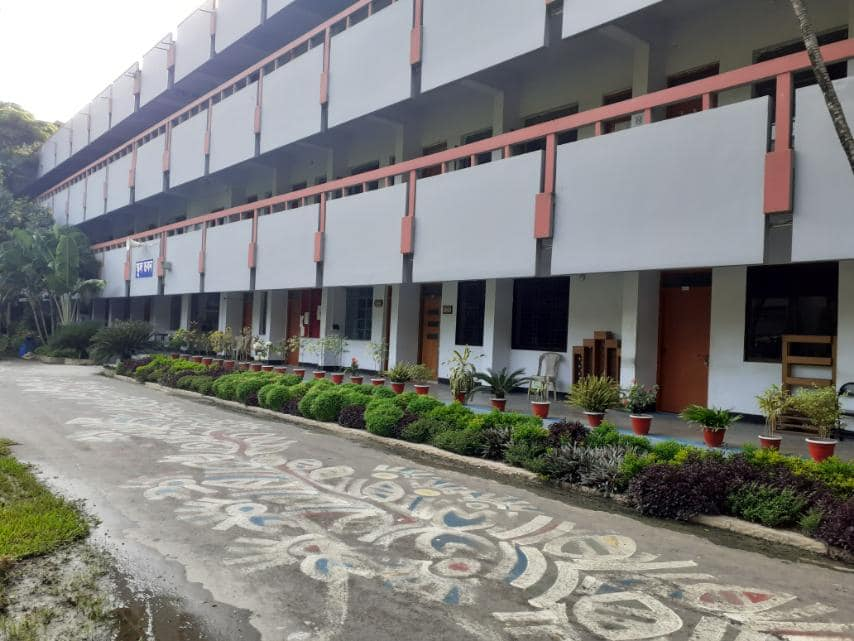
School Building (Bangla Version)

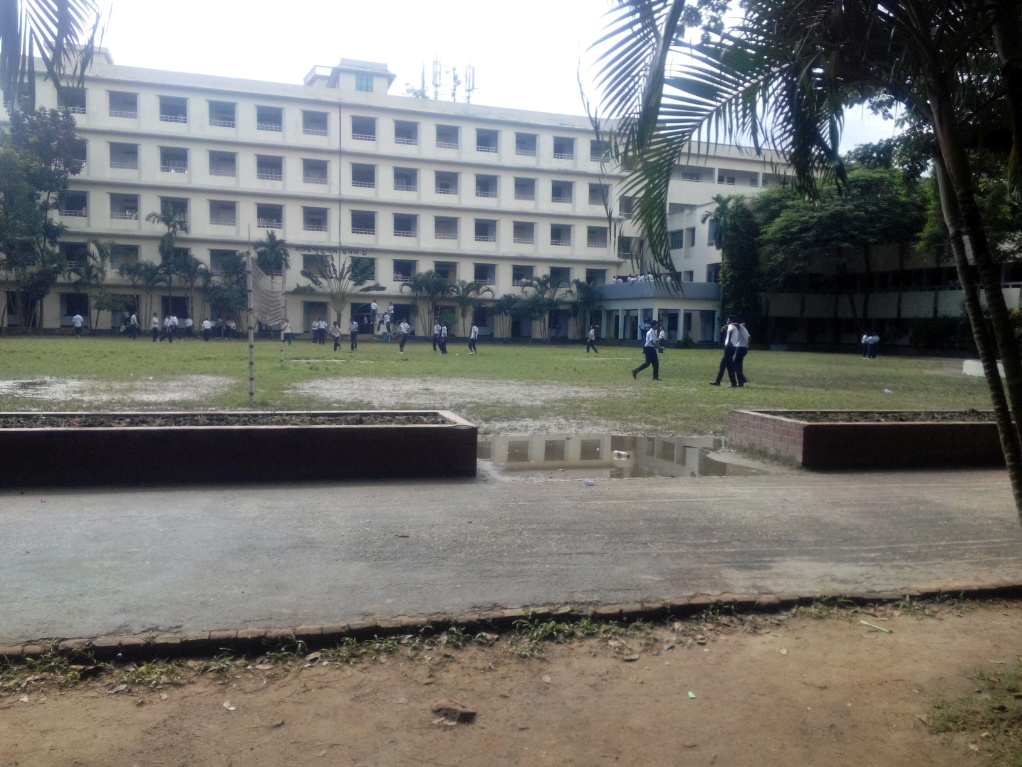
Multipurpose Building At 2014.

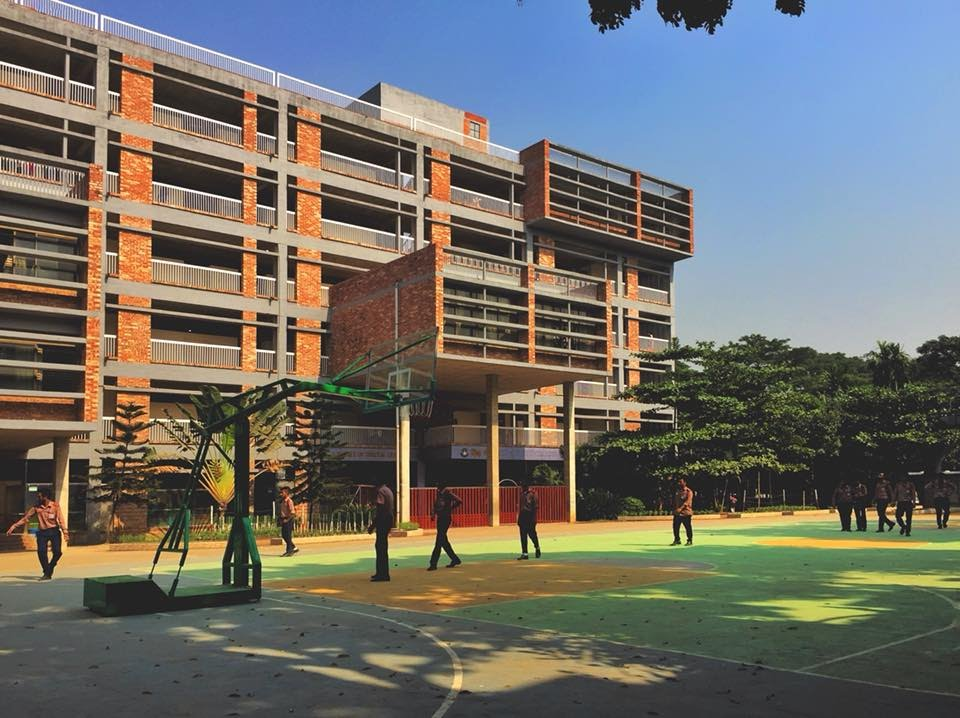
Birshrestha Noor Mohammad Public College's English Version Building

== Co-curricular Activities ==
In addition to academic excellence, co-curricular activities play a vital role in the holistic development of students. Birshreshtha Noor Mohammad Public College firmly believes in this philosophy. To nurture students' creativity, leadership skills, and human values, a variety of club-based activities have been established throughout the institution.

Among them, the Bangla Language and Literature Club, Drama Club, and Debate Club are considered some of the most active and prominent. These clubs regularly organize various events, competitions, and workshops to foster literary appreciation, theatrical practice, and logical thinking among students.

In addition, the college offers a wide range of other clubs to encourage diverse creative growth, including the Photography Club, Science Club, Sports Club, Art Club, Well-being Club and Recitation Club, among others. Each of these clubs helps students expand their knowledge beyond textbooks and develop essential life skills for the future.

== Notable faculty ==
- Jharna Rahman
