= Shakil Ahmed (general, died 2009) =

Bangladesh military officer (died 2009)

- শাকিল আহমেদ
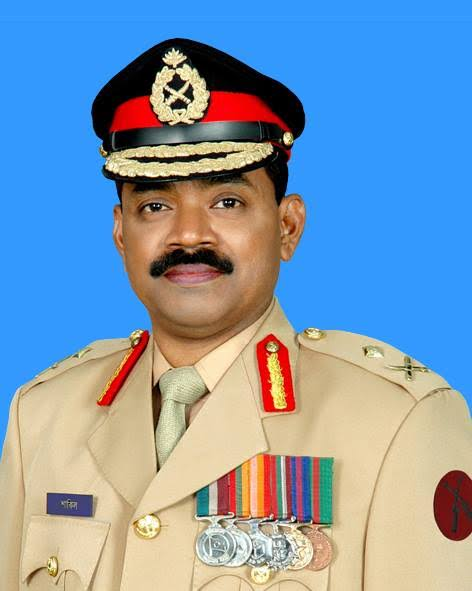

16th Director General of Bangladesh Rifles
- In office 19 February 2006 – 25 February 2009
- President: Iajuddin Ahmed; Zillur Rahman
- Prime Minister: Khaleda Zia; Iajuddin Ahmed (acting); Fazlul Haque (acting); Fakhruddin Ahmed (acting); Sheikh Hasina
- Preceded by: Jahangir Alam Chowdhury
- Succeeded by: Mainul Islam

Personal details
- Died: 25 February 2009 Pilkhana, Bangladesh
- Cause of death: Assassination
- Spouse: Nazneen Shakil Shipu
- Children: 2
- Education: Military Training Bangladesh Military Academy, Chittagong; Fort Sill, US Army

Military service
- Allegiance: Bangladesh
- Branch/service: Bangladesh Army; Bangladesh Rifles
- Years of service: 1976–2009
- Rank: Major General
- Unit: Regiment of Artillery
- Commands: Sector Commander of Bangladesh Rifles; Commander of 66th Artillery Brigade; Military Secretary at Army Headquarters; GOC of 66th Infantry Division; Director General of Bangladesh Rifles
- Battles/wars: Bangladesh Rifles revolt †

Shakil Ahmed (Bengali: শাকিল আহমেদ; died 25 February 2009) was a Bangladesh military officer who served as the antecedent director general of the Bangladesh Rifles. He was commissioned into the Bangladesh Army's Regiment of Artillery in 1976. Ahmed was a graduate of the Armed Forces Staff College, Malaysia. A former distinguished allied graduate from the Field Artillery Officers Advanced Course at Fort Sill of the US Army, he had been a directing staff at Defence Services Command and Staff College in Mirpur, Dhaka. Ahmed was also an instructor at Artillery School and commanded an artillery brigade. He also served as a sector commander of Bangladesh Rifles. Ahmed was assassinated during the Bangladesh Rifles revolt.

== Career ==
He had twice commanded field artillery regiments, of which one was in active service in a counter-insurgency role. He was an assistant defence attaché at the Bangladesh High Commission in London; a staff officer at the Prime Minister's Office, the Armed Forces Division; and a chief operations staff officer of the Field Artillery Brigade. Brigadier General Ahmed graduated from the National Defence College of Bangladesh in 2002 and was promoted to the rank of major general.

He was the chief (director general) of the national paramilitary force Bangladesh Rifles from 19 February 2006 to 25 February 2009. General Ahmed started Operation Daal bhat, an operation to sell grocery items at low cost. For the first time in 19 years, the salaries of the soldiers were proposed to be increased by the chief. He was killed along with his wife in the 2009 Bangladesh Rifles revolt.

== Assassination ==
The soldiers of the Bangladesh Rifles had grievances over their salaries, living conditions, and greater opportunities for deployment in UN peacekeeping missions. A day before the event on 25 February 2009, the disgruntled soldiers met General Ahmed and some of his commanders and urged them to raise their grievances with Prime Minister Sheikh Hasina at or after the function. Despite repeated attempts by General Ahmed to the civilian government to improve the living standard of the soldiers. General Ahmed had also raised the grievances during an interview with Channel i on 22 February.

=== Events ===
On 25 February, during the daily morning parade when Ahmed was taking the salutes, a soldier with a gun (stolen from the secured official stock) attempted to shoot the general. The soldier then hesitated, and, due to nervousness, fainted on the spot. General Ahmed asked his officers to get some water so that the soldier would wake up, without knowing what the soldiers were about to attempt. Meanwhile, some of the mutineers shouted out loud to wake up, and every soldier inside responded to the code which initiated the mutiny and left the Darbar hall, ignoring commands from their senior officers to stay put. After a few minutes, the soldiers started shooting at Darbar hall from outside the premises. General Ahmed asked for his private cellphone to call for help. When the army officers inside Darbar hall sensed that reinforcements would not be arriving anytime soon despite repeated calls for help, the general's officers arranged an escape plan aimed at evacuating the general and other senior officers. However, Ahmed's response differed from the plan put forward by the subordinate officers. According to a number of surviving witnesses, General Ahmed said, "I will not abandon my officers here, we must know why the soldiers are going for a mutiny despite everything we have done for them and as army officers stationed here it's our duty to prevent such a mutiny and those of you who fear death, remember it will come eventually and if we die today, remember that we die serving the nation." Finally the mutineers stopped shooting from outside and asked the officers inside to stand in a straight line and exit the Darbar hall, claiming that they would not be shot at. Ahmed ordered his men to walk behind him. He walked down the stage as asked by the soldiers and then suddenly four soldiers jumped out and fired four bullets at the officers, hitting the general in the process. Autopsy results showed that he was shot 6 times from close range. According to some surviving officers, the general died on the spot. At the same time, some army officers tried to stop and resist the mutineers from shooting. The other officers escaped from the Darbar hall. Since the Darbar hall laws allowed no weapons to be carried inside, all the officers were unarmed, contributing to 57 army officer deaths. The general's official bungalow in Pilkhana was ransacked, and his wife was also killed in the mutiny.

Preceded by Major General Jahangir Alam Chowdhury	Director General of Border Guard Bangladesh; June 2006	Succeeded by Major General Md Mainul Islam
