= Bangladesh Rifles revolt =

2009 mutiny and massacre in Bangladesh

Bangladesh Rifles Revolt
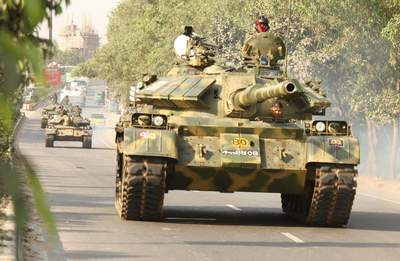
- Bangladesh Army tanks deployed in response to the unrest in Pilkhana
| Date | 25 February 2009 – 2 March 2009 (6 days) |
| Location | Bangladesh: Pilkhana, Dhaka; 23.7345°N 90.3776°E |
| Result | Revolt Fails: Surrender of mutineers; Mutineers assassinate many high-ranking officers, including the Chief of the Bangladesh Rifles. |

Belligerents
| Bangladesh Rifles (mutineers) | Bangladesh; Bangladesh Army; Bangladesh Rifles; Bangladesh Police; Rapid Action Battalion |

Commanders and leaders
| Unknown | (Bangladesh) General Moeen U Ahmed; (Bangladesh) Major General Ashab Uddin Shakil Ahmed X |

Strength
| 1,200 mutineers | Unknown |

Casualties and losses
| 8 killed, 200 captured | 57 killed, 6 missing |
- 17 civilians killed

The Bangladesh Rifles revolt, also known as the Pilkhana massacre or Pilkhana tragedy, was a mutiny that took place on 25–26 February 2009 in Dhaka, when a group of Bangladesh Rifles (BDR) personnel seized the force's headquarters in Pilkhana. The mutineers killed Director General Shakil Ahmed, 56 other army officers and 17 civilians; fired on bystanders; held officers and their families hostage; and looted and vandalised property. Unrest later spread to several other cities before the rebels surrendered following negotiations with the government.

In 2013, a Dhaka court convicted hundreds of accused BDR personnel in what international human rights organisations criticised as an unfair mass trial. On 23 December 2024, the Ministry of Home Affairs established a seven-member commission to re-investigate the incident, which reported in November 2025 that the mutiny had been a planned operation rather than a spontaneous uprising, alleging involvement of senior Awami League figures, including incumbent Prime Minister Sheikh Hasina, and flagging evidence destruction and gaps in the original probe.

== History ==
=== First day ===
The mutiny started on the second day of the annual "BDR Week", which was earlier inaugurated by Prime Minister Sheikh Hasina. As the session began at the "Darbar Hall" auditorium, a number of jawans (enlisted men) spoke against the higher-ranked army officials, while BDR Director General Maj. Gen. Shakil Ahmed was making a speech. They demanded the removal of army officials from the BDR command and equal rights for BDR soldiers. Soon they took the director general and other senior officials hostage inside the auditorium, and later fired on them. They also prepared heavy weaponry at the main entrance gates of the headquarters. The Bangladesh Army moved in and took up strong positions surrounding the BDR headquarters.

The Director General of the BDR, Shakil Ahmed, was killed early during the first day of the revolt, along with dozens of other senior commanders of the BDR, when rebels attacked the residences of the officers and killed Ahmed. They also raided Ahmed's house and looted valuables. Additionally, at least six civilians, including a boy, were killed in the crossfire.

Prime Minister Sheikh Hasina on 25 February offered a general amnesty for the rebels except for those involved in the murdering of army officers, looting and other crimes against the state.

The mutineers had produced a 22-point demand, including the withdrawal of seconded regular army officers from the BDR. Instead, they wanted original BDR members to be promoted from the ranks. They demanded that their officials be selected on the basis of the Bangladesh Civil Service examination. While speaking to private television networks, BDR jawans alleged that senior officials of BDR were involved in a conspiracy, accusing the army officers of embezzling soldiers' wage bonuses from the Operation Dal-Bhaat Program and from extra duties in the general elections held on 29 December 2008. Operation Dal-Bhaat was a welfare program run by the BDR to provide rice and other daily essentials to the poor. Other demands included 100% rationing, inclusion of BDR soldiers in peacekeeping missions and improvements to the overall welfare of BDR members.

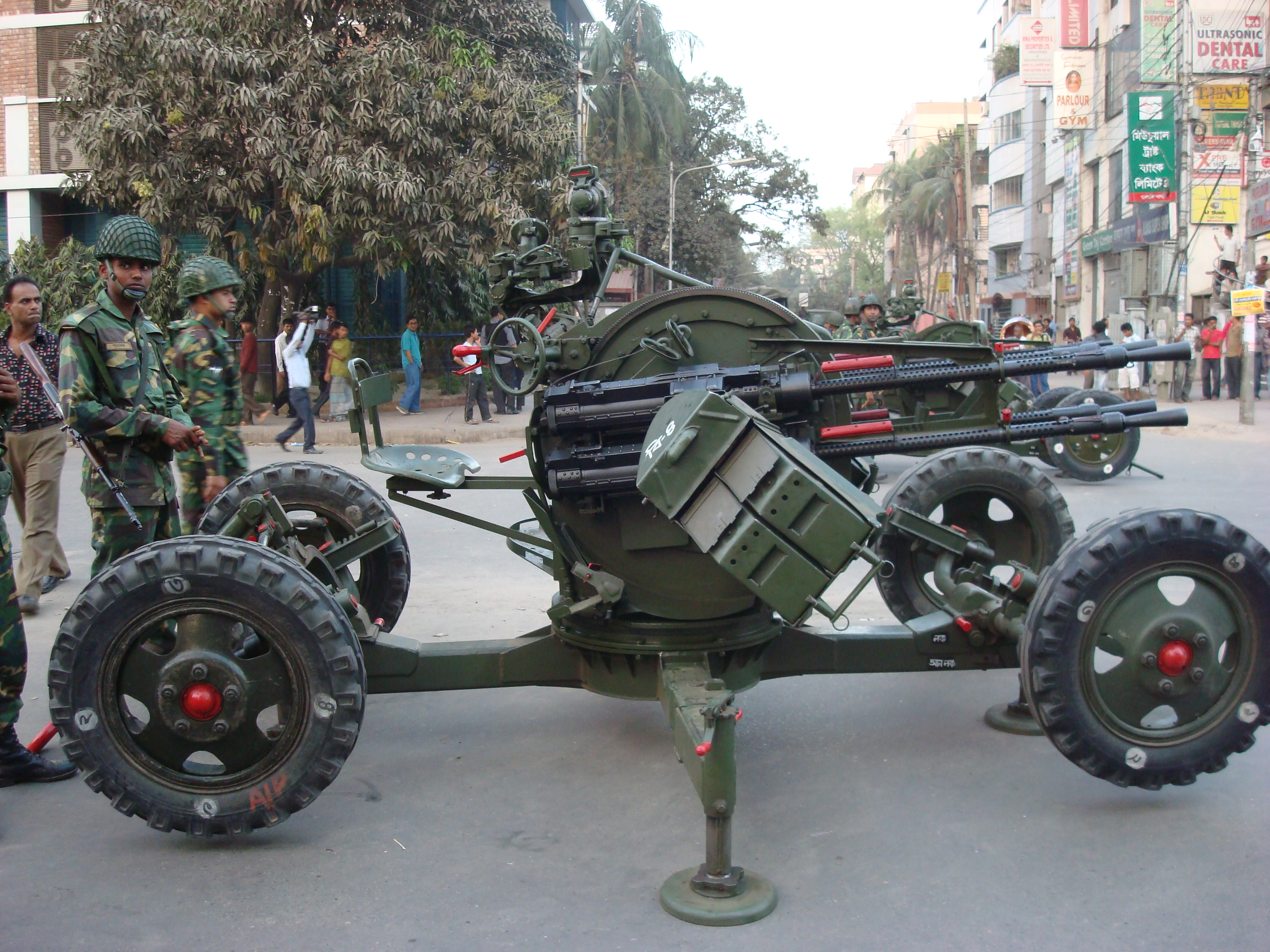
14.5 mm ZPU-4 of Bangladesh Army positioned over Satmasjid Road, near Dhanmondi 8A road, pointing towards Pilkhana on 25 February 2009

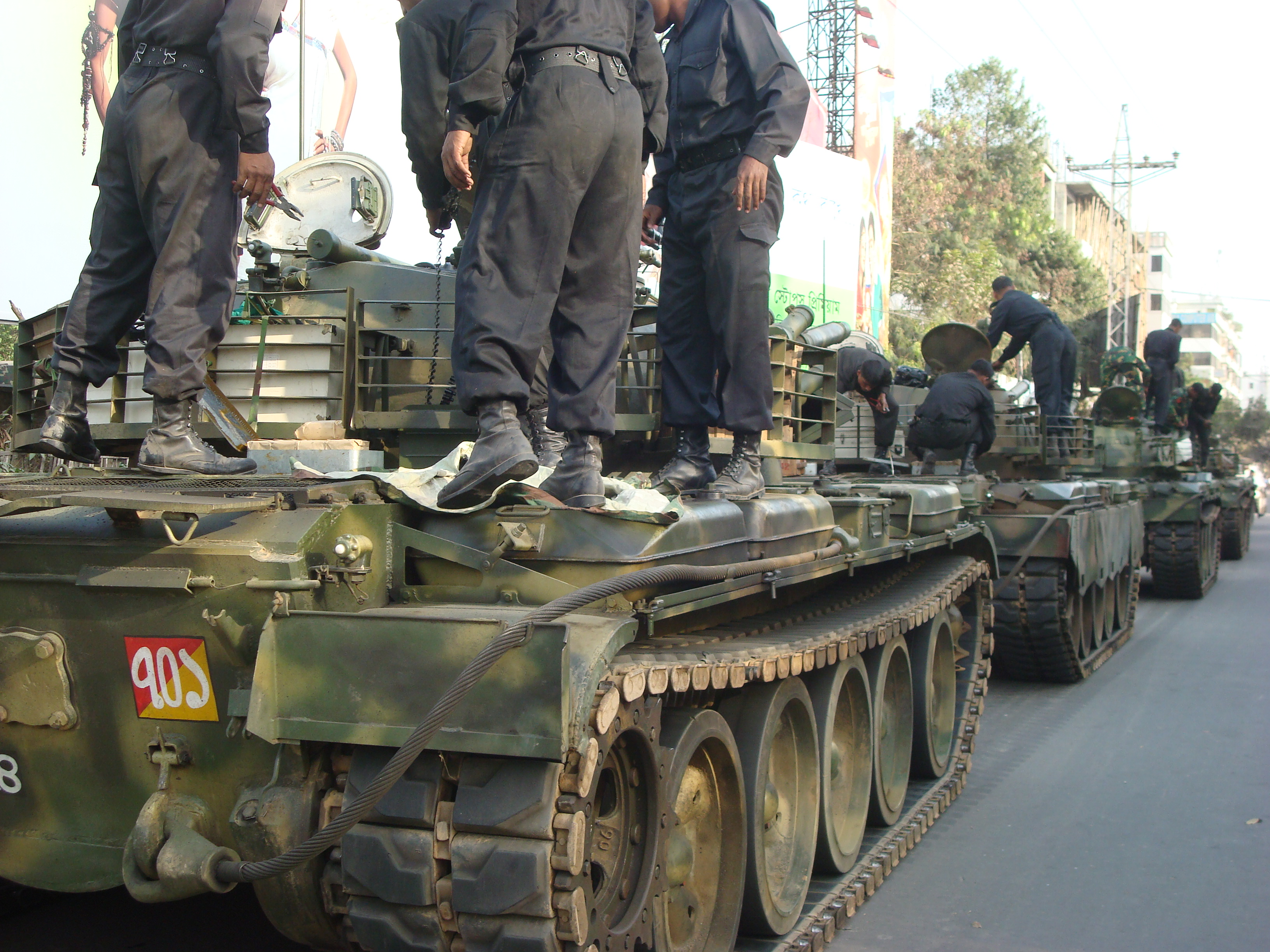
An array of tanks waiting beside Abahani ground on 26 February 2009

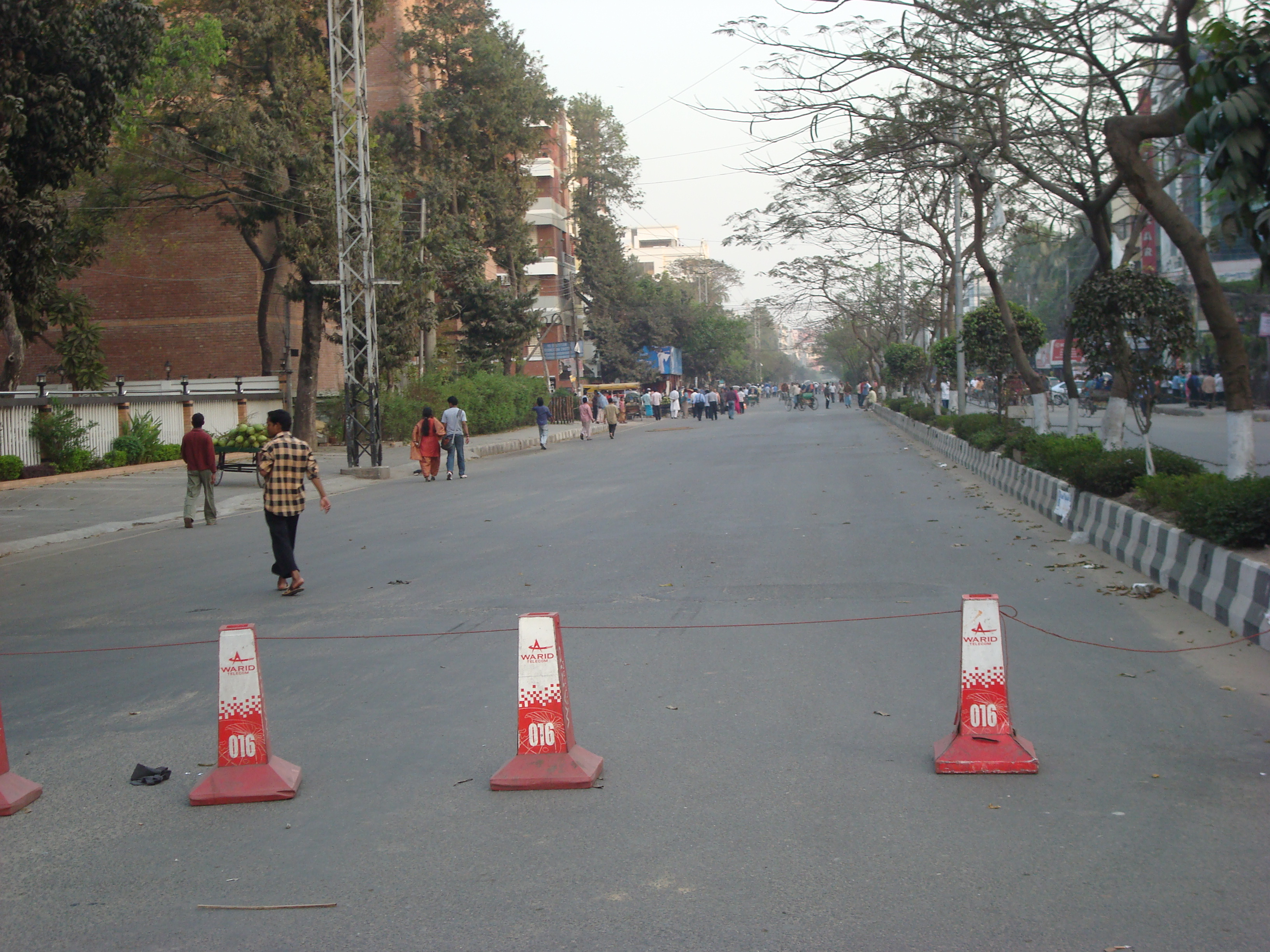
Barricade on the Satmasjid Road near State University on 25 February 2009, as seen from the western end of Dhanmondi Road 27

=== Second day ===
Home Minister Sahara Khatun convinced some mutineers to give up their arms by assuring them that the army would not go into the BDR headquarters. As a result, the rebels began to surrender their arms and release the hostages. However, as this was happening in Dhaka, revolts by other members of the BDR started in at least 12 other towns and cities. Fighting and takeovers by the BDR were reported in Chittagong, at Feni, on the eastern border with India, in Rajshahi in the northwest and Sylhet in the north.

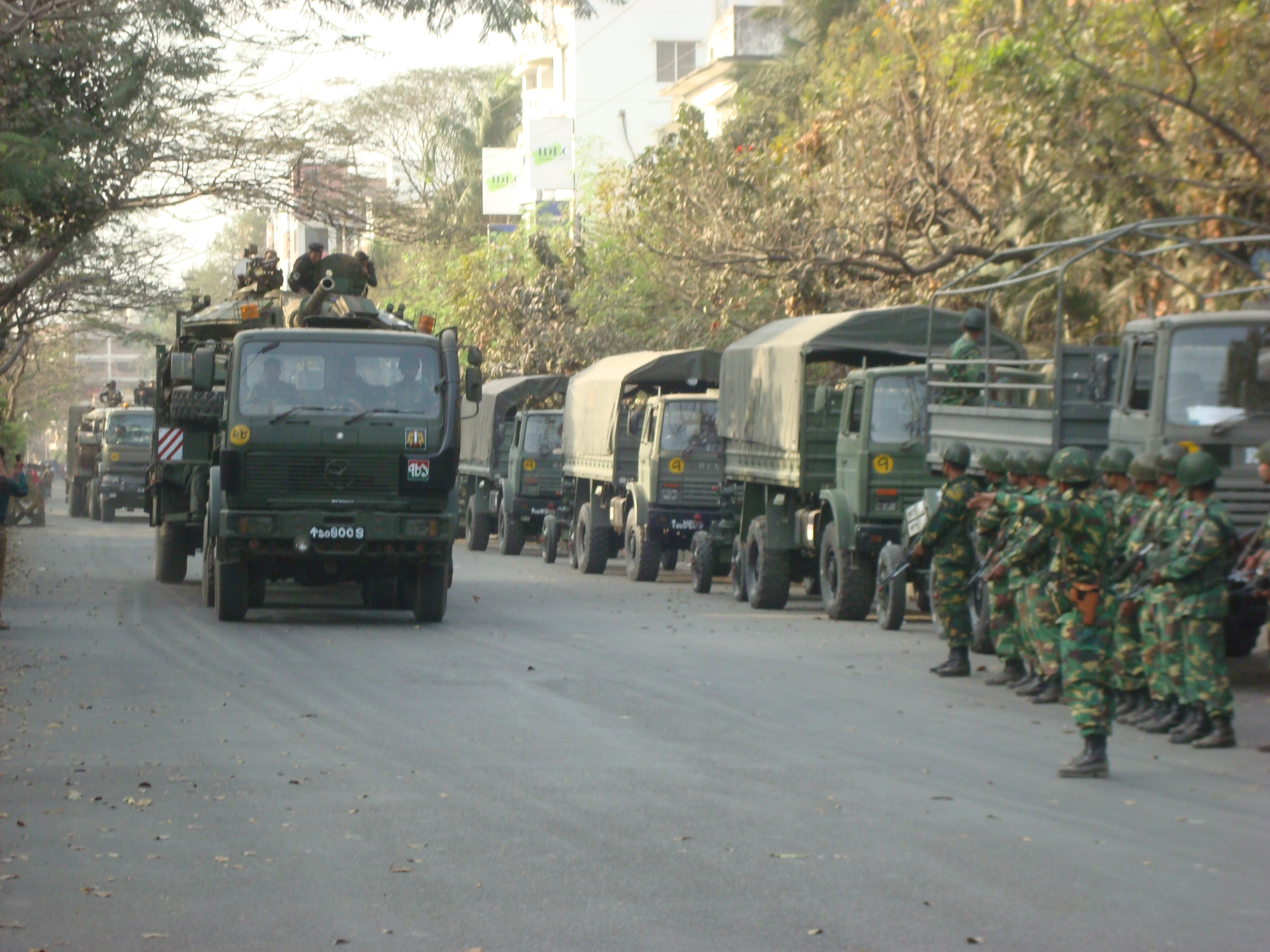
Army convoy gathering behind the tanks near Abahani ground on 26 February 2009

By 26 February, BDR outposts at more than 46 locations were reported to have shown signs of great agitation. BDR jawans had claimed to have taken command of the Jessore BDR garrison as well as major BDR establishments in Satkhira, Dinajpur, Naogaon and Netrokona. Army tanks and APCs were brought outside as the army took position, but they could not move in as officers were kept as hostages. BDR headquarters had heavy weapons inside that were controlled by the rebels. The army was preparing for a final assault as tanks were rolling down the streets of Dhaka. Paratroops and commandos were ready, but the PM tried to solve the case without any further casualties.

As per media tickers, BDR members again started surrendering their arms after the PM addressed the nation and reassured BDR personnel that no action would be taken against them. However, she also warned the mutineers of "harsh actions" if they did not immediately lay down their arms and cease all hostilities. Following the speech of Sheikh Hasina, the army deployed tanks in front of the BDR headquarters. After that, the mutineers surrendered their arms as described by the media spokesman of the Prime Minister. Following the surrender, the Armed Police Battalion took over the BDR headquarters.

=== Third day ===
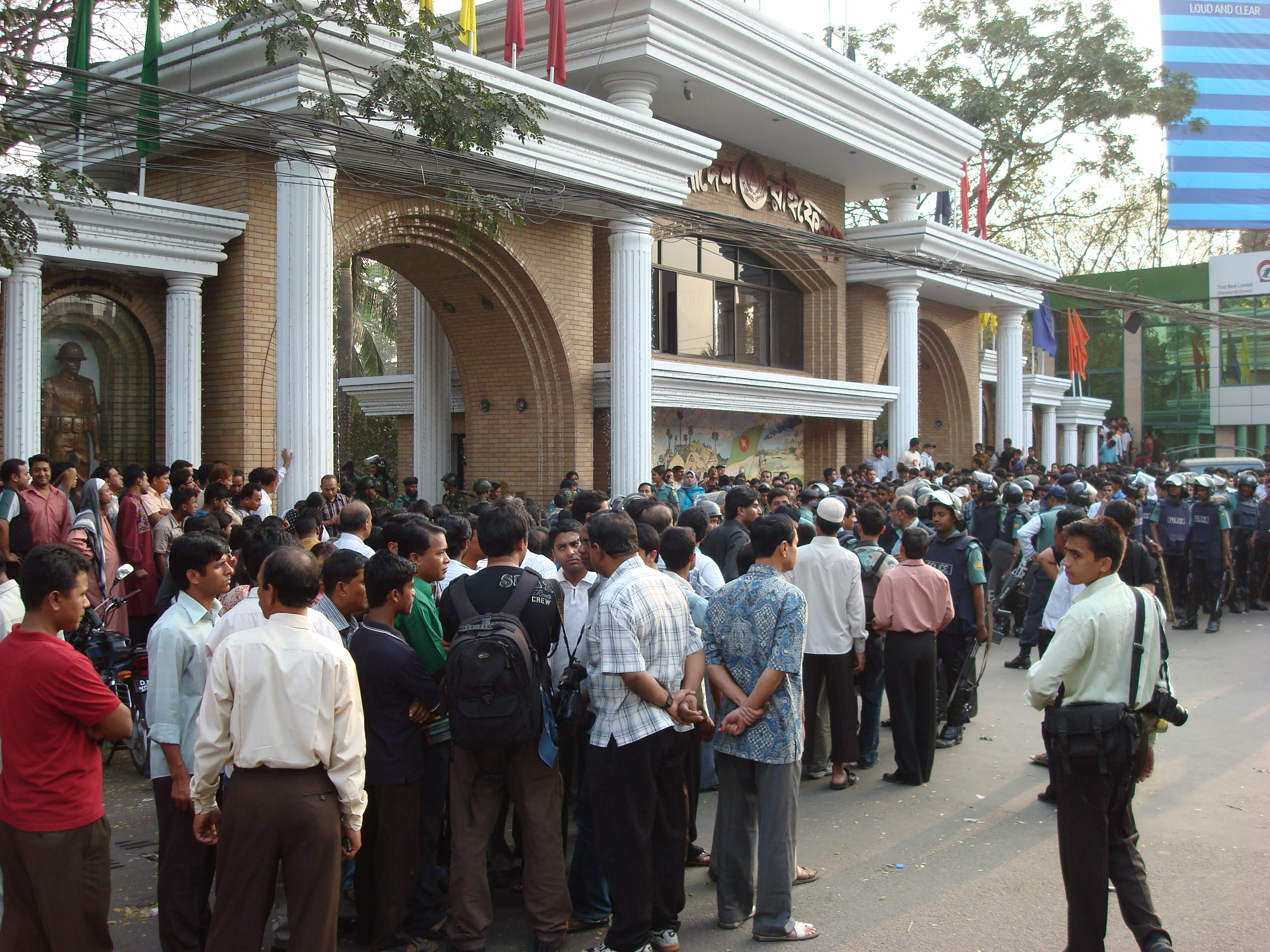
Media workers, armed forces and members of the public waiting by the 4th Bangladesh Rifles main entrance gate on the afternoon of 27 February 2009.

On 27 February, about 200 mutineers were arrested while trying to escape from their headquarters at Pilkhana in civilian outfits. Army tanks and troops entered the headquarters of the BDR. Home Minister Sahara Khatun had assured that the army had entered under the supervision of the Home Ministry. She also said that BDR personnel were kept at a safer place inside the headquarters, and the army had entered to help with the rescue and search operations. Bangladesh army tanks rolled throughout Dhaka in a show of force, which persuaded the remaining mutineers to lay down their arms and surrender. It was still unclear whether the mutiny had been aborted in at least 12 BDR bases outside of Dhaka. As searches for missing personnel continued inside the headquarters, 42 more bodies were found, and it was wrongly thought that more than 130 regular army officers had been killed by the rebels. As of 27 February, the official death toll had risen to 54. The body of BDR chief Maj. Gen. Shakil Ahmed was found among those of 41 other army officials. A mass grave was found inside, near the BDR hospital. A total of 42 officers were found buried inside a seven-foot-deep hole. Some bodies had been thrown into drain tunnels. Out of 58 bodies that were found, 52 were army officials. Beginning on 27 February, the government declared a three-day period of national mourning.

=== Fourth day ===
The body of the BDR chief's wife was recovered as three more mass graves were found. Many of the bodies had badly decomposed and were difficult to identify. Military Intelligence (MI) announced that the body count in the mutiny at BDR headquarters stood at 63, while 72 army officers still remained missing. Of the 63 bodies, 47 were identified. The army postponed the funerals of those who died until all the bodies were found. Thirty-one officers deputised to the paramilitary force survived the revolt.

Newly appointed BDR Director Maj. Gen. Moinul Hossain said their immediate task would be to "regain the command structure" of the paramilitary force.

Lt. Gen. M.A. Mubin, the army's second-in-command, said the killers would be punished. "The BDR troops who took part in these barbaric and grisly acts cannot be pardoned and will not be pardoned", he said in a televised address, AFP reported.

Bangladesh Rifles (BDR) members who were absent from their workplaces without any leave or permission following the mutiny were asked to report to BDR headquarters or the nearest sector headquarters or battalion headquarters or police stations within 24 hours, but only about 100 responded.

=== Fifth day ===
On 1 March 2009, Prime Minister Sheikh Hasina went to Dhaka Cantonment to brief 500 army officers about the mutiny. Hasina was strongly discouraged from attending the meeting by senior members of her cabinet. However, she attended as she believed it was her duty to hear the grievances of her people. Hasina attended the meeting with Major-General Tarique Ahmed Siddique, who was her Defence and Security adviser, and Agriculture Minister Matia Chowdhury.

The meeting lasted two and a half hours and began with a moment of silence for those killed in the mutiny. The atmosphere of the meeting was riotous. During the meeting, army officers reportedly broke chairs and hit their heads against the walls. Some army officers demanded public executions for those guilty of murder. The meeting ended with prayers. After the meeting, seven army officers were dismissed by General Moeen U Ahmed because of disrespectful conduct towards the Prime Minister.

=== Sixth day ===
The following day, on 2 March 2009, a state funeral of the slain officers was completed at 11 a.m. On the same day, the mutiny was finally acknowledged as being ended.

== Casualties ==
A total of 74 people were killed. Among them were 57 army officers seconded to the BDR. The chief of the BDR, the deputy chief and all 16 sector commanders were killed during the revolt.

== Trials and sentencing ==
The government established an investigative committee to determine the causes behind the rebellion, with Home Minister Sahara Khatun as the chair. The committee was later reformed and reinforced after opposition and pressure groups speculated that it might not function impartially, as the home minister was investigating an incident of her own ministry. The Bangladesh Army also formed an investigation committee that began proceedings on 3 March. The Army, with the help of the Rapid Action Battalion (RAB) and police, had started "Operation Rebel Hunt" to capture BDR rebels. The government had also undertaken a decision to change the name and framework of Bangladesh Rifles and deployed the army across the country for an indeterminate period. The government asked for the FBI and Scotland Yard to support the investigation. Trials began soon after the first arrests. Members of the 37th Rifles Battalion were tried on 13 November 2010. They were charged with looting firearms and ammunition from the armoury and firing their weapons, creating panic in the city, desecrating the portrait of BDR DG Maj. Gen. Shakil Ahmed and giving provocative statements before the media. BDR personnel of the 39th Rifles Battalion were accused of looting firearms, firing shots and siding with the Dhaka mutineers, who killed the top ranks of the force in February. As of January 2011, thousands were tried in Bangladesh for the mutiny. Lt. Colonel Shams Chowdhury testified as a prosecution witness.

The mutineers were subjected to widespread abuse in custody, including systematic torture, mistreatment, daily beatings, and electrocution that resulted in about 50 custodial deaths and many more cases of permanent paralysis. Torture is routinely used by security forces in Bangladesh, even though it is a party to the United Nations Convention Against Torture. Human Rights Watch and others have long documented the systematic use of torture in Bangladesh by its security forces, including the army, the RAB and the Directorate General of Forces Intelligence, the country's main intelligence agency. Around 6,000 soldiers were convicted by courts in mass trials and sentenced to terms of imprisonment ranging from four months to seven years, including fines for participation in the mutiny. 823 soldiers who allegedly killed their senior officers were charged and tried in a civilian court for murder, torture, conspiracy and other offences.

On 5 November 2013, Dhaka Metropolitan Sessions Court sentenced 152 people to death and 161 to life imprisonment; 256 received prison terms between three and ten years, while 277 were acquitted. Lawyers for the convicted have said that they would appeal the judgement. Bangladesh Nationalist Party member of Parliament Nasiruddin Ahmed Pintu was among those sentenced to life in prison.

A Human Rights Watch spokesperson described the mass trial as "an affront to international legal standards". UN High Commissioner for Human Rights Navi Pillay has drawn attention to flaws in the trial, calling it "rife with procedural irregularities, including the lack of adequate and timely access to lawyers". A spokesperson for Amnesty International condemned the sentences, stating that they "seem designed to satisfy a desire for cruel revenge". Some of those accused, more than 50 according to one estimate, are reported to have died while in custody.

Human Rights Watch said in a report that "the mass trials of nearly 6,000 suspects raise serious fair trial concerns". "Those responsible for the horrific violence that left 74 dead should be brought to justice, but not with torture and unfair trials," said Brad Adams, Asia director at Human Rights Watch. "The government's initial response to the mutiny was proportionate and saved lives by refusing army demands to use overwhelming force in a heavily populated area. But since then it has essentially given a green light to the security forces to exact revenge through physical abuse and mass trials."

== Re-investigation and subsequent report ==
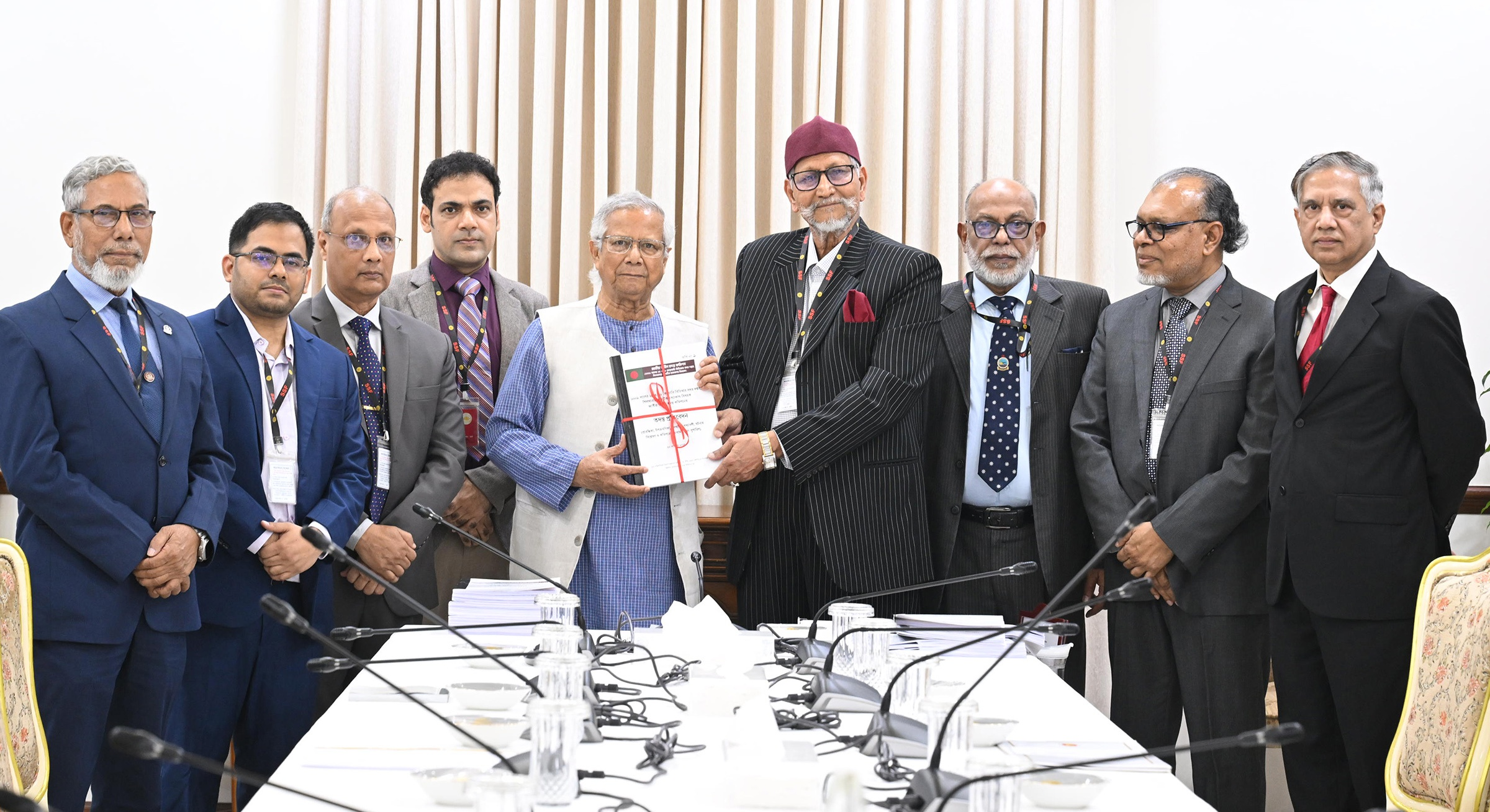
National Independent Inquiry Commission on BDR mutiny submitting the reinvestigated report to Chief Adviser Muhammad Yunus

Following the resignation of Sheikh Hasina in August 2024, several speakers at a discussion in Dhaka publicly acknowledged former Prime Minister Sheikh Hasina and the Indian government of involvement in the mutiny, calling for a renewed investigation and the restoration of the force's original name, BDR. Some participants, including retired military officers and relatives of victims, alleged broader political motives and external influence behind the incident.

On 15 December 2024, the Ministry of Home Affairs informed the High Court that it would not form a commission to re-investigate the massacre, prompting public criticism. Two days later, leaders of the Students Against Discrimination announced plans for protests if a commission was not created. On 23 December, the ministry established a seven-member commission to conduct a fresh inquiry.

On 30 November 2025, the commission released its findings, concluding that the massacre was a planned operation rather than a spontaneous mutiny. The report alleged involvement of senior Awami League figures, claiming that Fazle Noor Taposh acted as a key coordinator and that then–Prime Minister Sheikh Hasina approved the operation. It also cited evidence destruction and missing key individuals during the original probe. That same day, the commission's chief stated that 921 Indian nationals had entered Bangladesh around the time of the incident, with 67 remaining unaccounted for. The report suggested that the killings were planned with the involvement of external and domestic actors. According to the 360-page report submitted to authorities, a high-level meeting at the office of Fazle Noor Taposh, with the presence of other senior figures from Awami League, such as Sheikh Selim, Sohel Taj, and a group of 24 foreign agents, finalized the plan for the massacre. Awami League leaders Jahangir Kabir Nanak, Mirza Azam, Harun ur Rashid (also known as Leather Liton), and Torab Ali were present at several meetings to implement the plan. Colonel Shams Chowdhury, Commanding Officer of 44 Rifles Battalion, was aware of these plans, and Taposh was responsible for obtaining approval for the decision from former Prime Minister Sheikh Hasina. The report claims that BDR personnel were first mobilized via covert recruitment shortly after the 2008 Bangladeshi general election, then indoctrinated and financially incentivized to carry out the violence at Pilkhana. The report also claimed that, after the mutiny began, Captain Tanvir Haider Noor informed his wife about the presence of Indian National Security Guard members in Pilkhana. His wife, Tasnuva Maha, said that she heard three men dressed in BDR uniforms talking with each other in Hindi. Multiple witnesses reported hearing conversations in Hindi, Western Bengali dialect, and unknown languages in Pilkhana that day. The commission cited various facts in the report, including hearing foreign languages, the escape of outsiders, foreign numbers in the call list, and Captain Tanvir's last conversation, as evidence of India's involvement.

== See also ==
- 7 November 1972 Bangladesh Rifles mutiny
- Bangladesh Army
- Bangladesh Rifles
- Human rights in Bangladesh
- List of revolutions and rebellions
