= Pilkhana, Bangladesh =

Paramilitary cantonment and headquarters of the Border Guard Bangladesh

Pilkhana BGB Headquarter
- পিলখানা বিজিবি সদর দপ্তর
- Dhanmondi, Dhaka, Bangladesh

Site information
- Type: Cantonment
- Controlled by: Border Guard Bangladesh

Location
- Coordinates: 23°43′57″N 90°22′30″E

Garrison information
- Current commander: Major General Mohammad Ashrafuzzaman Siddiqui

Pilkhana (Bengali: পিলখানা) is a para-military cantonment in Dhaka. It is the headquarters of Border Guard Bangladesh, located to the south of Dhanmondi in Dhaka of Bangladesh.

== Etymology ==
The word Pilkhana means "stable of elephants". Pilkhana is not officially named in any record of Dhaka City Corporation, but this is the popular name of this place as elephants are a part of its history (pil means "elephant" and khana means "home").

== History ==
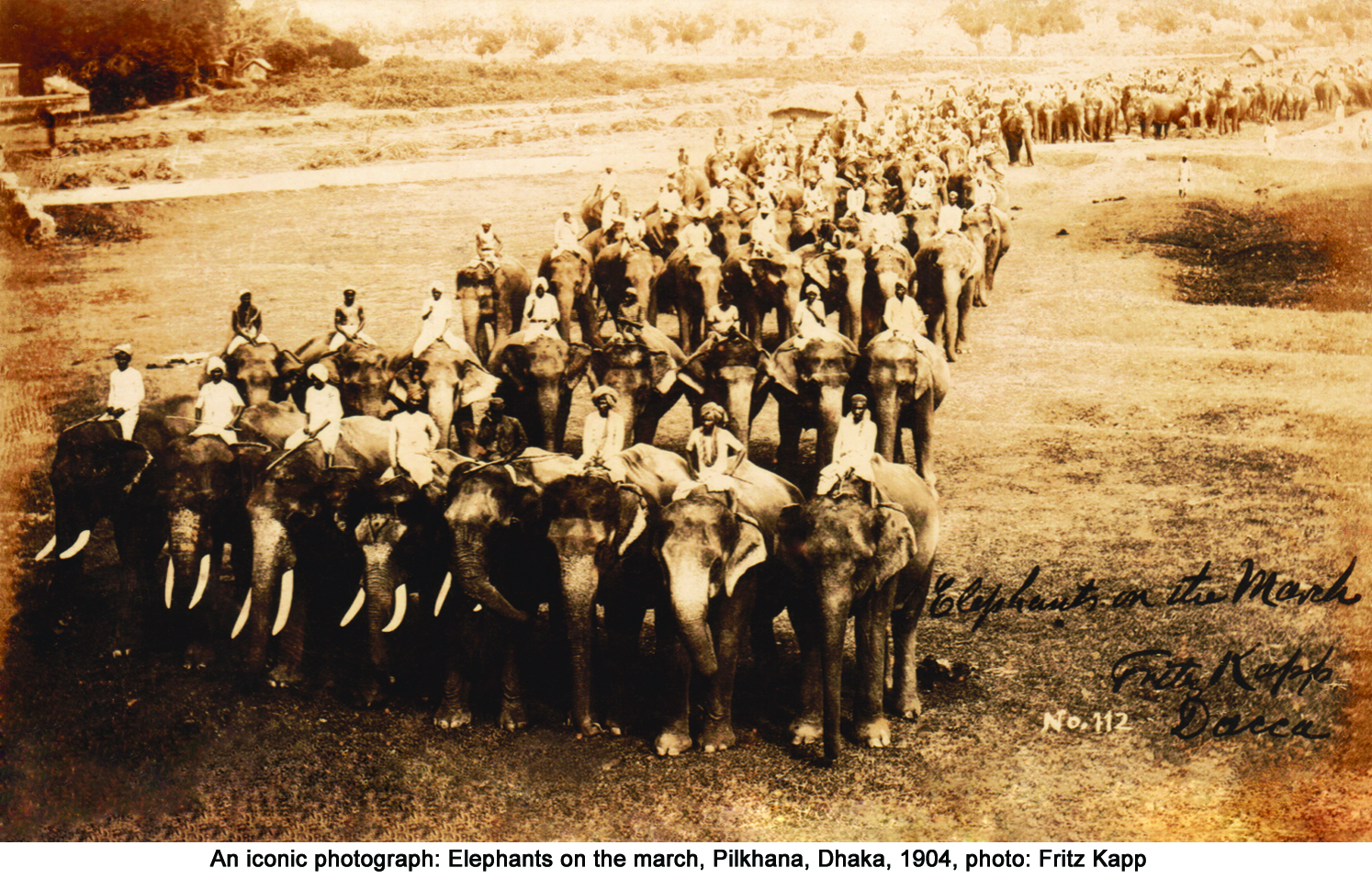
Elephants on march in Pilkhana during 1895–1900

During the Mughal period, the royal elephants kept in this place used to go for grazing in the nearby jungle to the east, which was later turned into Dhaka Nawab's Garden, now known as Paribagh and Shahbagh. The path between Pilkhana and the jungle, through which the elephants traversed, later became a public road named Elephant Road.

After the fall of the Mughal Empire, the place named Pilkhana continued to be used in the same manner and before the British Empire took over the place for their military activity. In 1876, Viceroy of India founded "Frontier Force" and established its headquarters in Pilkhana. This Frontier Force changed its name as Assam Bengal Rifles in the year 1920 AD. After the achievement of Pakistan the name of this para-military force was changed to East Pakistan Rifles (EPR), thereafter during the Independence War of 1971, the name of EPR was changed to East Pakistan Civil Armed Force (EPCAF). After the Independence of Bangladesh, it was changed to Bangladesh Rifles (BDR), and after the BDR carnage on 25 February 2009, it has been changed currently as Border Guard Bangladesh, BGB. Although with the passage of time the name of the said para-military force was changed on a number of occasions but the headquarters of it remains in Pilkhana.

=== 1971-present ===
1971, 25 March: At midnight, the Pakistan Army attacked the EPR headquarters at Pilkhana.

2009, 25–28 February: The 2009 Bangladesh Rifles revolt took place. Members of the Bangladesh Rifles mutinied against senior officials of BDR who were mostly from Bangladesh Army. While the exact reasons for such a widespread mutiny largely remains unknown, words have been on the air regarding possible involvement of vested political quarters inside Bangladesh and even of forces outside Bangladesh. On that fateful day of 25 February 2009 at 9 AM Bangladesh Rifles jawans entered the "Darbar Hall" auditorium killing BDR Director General Major General Shakil Ahmed. Over the next three days, the BDR jawans killed as many as 54 officers and their family members including women and children. The conflict left as many as 57 people dead and 6 missing.

== Location ==
The Elephant Road now can be traced starting at BGB Gate number 3, running through the middle of New Super Market, adjacent to Dhaka New Market, touching the Gauchia Market to reach Bata signal point, and ending at Paribagh. This road is now known as Old Elephant Road.

== Education ==
- Birshreshtha Munshi Abdur Rouf Public College
- Birshreshtha Noor Mohammad Public College
