= Border Guard Bangladesh =

Border security agency of Bangladesh

Border Guard Bangladesh বর্ডার গার্ড বাংলাদেশ Bôrḍar Garḍ Baṅladeś
- Roundel of Border Guard Bangladesh

- Flag of Border Guard Bangladesh
- Abbreviation: BGB; BDR (1971–2009); EPR (1947–1971)
- Motto: সীমান্তের অতন্দ্র প্রহরী; (Simanter ôtôndrô prôhôri); 'Ever vigilant sentinels of the border'

Agency overview
- Formed: 29 June 1795; 231 years ago, as Ramgarh Local Battalion
- Preceding agency: Ramgarh Local Battalion (1795–1861); Frontier Guard (1861–1891); Bengal Military Police (1891–1920); Bengal Battalion and Eastern Frontier Rifles (1920–1946); Bengal Rifles (1946–1947); East Pakistan Rifles (1947–1971); Bangladesh Rifles (1971–2009)
- Employees: 70,000 personnel
- Annual budget: ৳4602 crore (US$380 million) 2026-2027

Jurisdictional structure
- National agency: Bangladesh
- Operations jurisdiction: Bangladesh
- Area: 4,427 km^{2} (1,709 sq mi)
- Population: 162 million
- Governing body: Government of Bangladesh
- Constituting instrument: Border Guard Bangladesh Act, 2010
- Specialist jurisdictions: National border patrol, security, integrity; Paramilitary law enforcement, counter insurgency, riot control

Operational structure
- Headquarters: Pilkhana, Bangladesh
- Minister responsible: Salahuddin Ahmed, Minister of Home Affairs
- Agency executives: 1.Major General Mohammad Ashrafuzzaman Siddiqui, Director General; 2.Brigadier General Imtaz Uddin, Additional Director General
- Parent agency: Ministry of Home Affairs
- Functions: 8: Border Protection; Counter Terrorism; Anti Smuggling Operations; Enforcement Operations; Immigration Compliance; Maritime Operations; Detention Operations; Tariff Collection

Facilities
- Battalions: 64 battalions
- Armored vehicles: Otokar Cobra, KrAZ-Spartan
- Vessels: Coastal Patrol Vessel, Interceptor Vessel
- Helicopters: Mi-171E

Notables
- Significant Battles: List; Indo-Pakistani war of 1965; Bangladesh Liberation War; Chittagong Hill Tracts conflict; Operation Dabanal; 1994 Bangladesh Ansar mutiny; 2001 Bangladeshi-Indian border skirmish; Operation Uttaran; Bangladesh Rifles revolt; Operation Thunderbolt (2016)
- Anniversary: 20 December
- Award: 1. Bir Sreshtho; 2. Bir Uttom; 3. Bir Bikrom; 4. Bir Protik

Website
- bgb.gov.bd
- Service uniform: Liver (Organ) Combat uniform: Rosy Brown, Old Mauve, Police Blue, Dark Gunmetal

Border Guard Bangladesh (Bengali: বর্ডার গার্ড বাংলাদেশ, romanized: Bôrḍar Gārd Bānlādeś; abbreviated as BGB) is the paramilitary force responsible for the protection and surveillance of Bangladesh's land borders. Operating under the Ministry of Home Affairs and with operational control by army officials, BGB ensures border security, prevents illegal cross-border activities, and assists in maintaining internal law and order when required. Originally formed as the Bangladesh Rifles (BDR), it was reorganized and renamed BGB in 2010 following major reforms.

BGB through its predecessor institutions boasts a military history spanning over two centuries. During peacetime, this force is also responsible for anti-smuggling operations, investigating cross-border crime and extending governmental authority to remote and isolated areas. From time to time, BGB has also been called upon to assist the administration in the maintenance of internal law and order, and relief and rehabilitation work after a natural disaster. During wartime, BGB comes under the control of the Ministry of Defence as an auxiliary force to the Bangladesh Army.

== History ==
=== British India ===
==== Origins ====
The Frontier protection force was established in the late 18th century at the city of Ramgarh when Chittagong and the surrounding areas came under the British East India Company's suzerainty from the Bengal Subah. With 486 personnel, the force operated as regional irregular law enforcements battalion in the southeastern frontier regions of Bengal Presidency and was commanded by an officer from the Bengal Army. In 1795, the force was reorganized into a paramilitary unit and re-christened as the Ramgarh Local Battalion. In this period, the Ramgarh personnel were rehearsed and given regalia and furthermore were instructed to suppress insurgent activities around the Ramgarh area. As the force's size became capable enough to fortify broader regions, it was restructured and established their paramilitary companies around Chittagong and Dacca which were called Special Reserve companies in 1799.

In 1861, the East India company renamed the battalion to as the Frontier Guards and shifted its headquarters to Pilkhana, a former Mughal elephantry stable turned cantonment, in 1876, which remains to this day. Most of the non-commissioned officers who were serving in the Frontier Guards conscripted to the Bengal Army during the Third Anglo-Burmese War in 1885. Due to its significance the British government re-established the force in 1891, via recruiting a plethora of personnel consist of mostly Bengali Muslims and named Bengal Military police. During this time, the organization was ameliorated with modern ordnance and functioned as military combat support and law enforcement units under Bengal command of the British Indian Army in Dacca, Chittagong, Dumka, Gangtok and Siliguri. By 1910, the battalion had presence in Garo Hills, Sylhet, Backergunge and Cachar.

Initially the force was commanded by a regional senior warrant officer called Subedar, however by 1911 it was estimated that the Bengal military police personnel was increased by 7,000 at the eve of First World War and by 1913 the force was in command under a commandant who was a commissioned officer from the British Indian Imperial Police. Under the commandant's administration, the Bengal military police was organized with regional headquarters which were called sectors and was orchestrated by assistant commandants who were commissioned officers of the British Imperial Police and the British Army. This regional structure is still in use by the force today. In 1914 the unit was transferred under the command of British Army as an active frontier enforcement unit till 1919.

==== Eastern Frontier Rifles ====
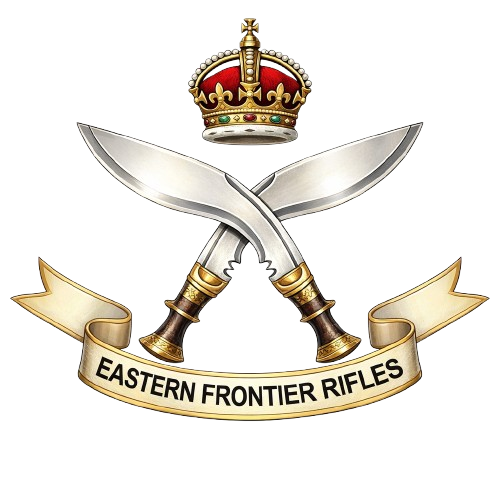
Eastern Frontier Rifles insignia

As the Bengal Military police's operation focused pivotally around Bengal and eastern frontier territories, the British Indian Government re-structured the force as Eastern Frontier Rifles in 1920 and returned under Imperial Police jurisdiction. Its primary task was to protect the borders and British sovereignty around various frontier districts of Bengal and Assam Provinces precisely in Chittagong, Garo, and Naga Hills and furthermore the Sylhet and Cachar districts. Eastern frontier rifles were also deployed in coastal cities like Barisal, Kharagpur, Tamluk and the eastern princely states such as Cooch Behar, Twipra and Manipur. Like its predecessor during war times, Eastern frontier rifles were also installed under the British Indian Army during the Second World War with battalions served at various military divisions and participated in the Burma campaign. After the partition of Bengal in 1947, the eastern frontier rifles was bifurcated with few battalions stationed at western Bengal of India and the rest were stationed in eastern Bengal of Pakistan. The Indian battalions retain the name of Eastern Frontier Rifles and serve under the West Bengal Police to this day. The Kharagpur sector established as the new headquarters for the Indian administration of Eastern Frontier Rifles while the Pakistani administration remained in the original headquarters at Pilkhana.

=== Pakistan ===
==== East Pakistan Rifles ====
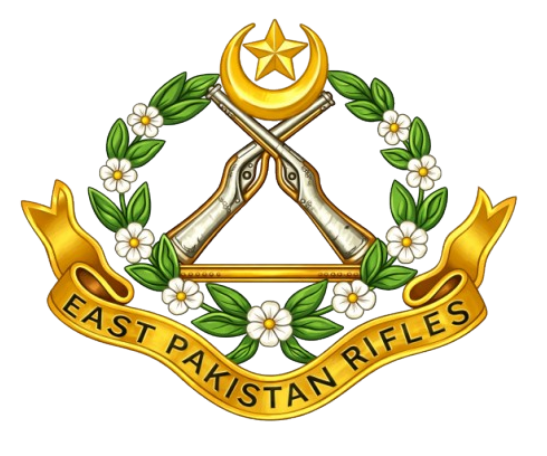
Insignia of East Pakistan Rifles till 1972.

At the partition, the majority of Eastern Frontier Rifles battalions were installed at East Bengal and were patriated to the Dominion of Pakistan in September 1947. The force was reconstituted in 1949 as the East Bengal Rifles. Their function was to provide internal security and assist the police in maintaining law and order during emergencies. In this capacity in 1954, they were deployed in industrial areas after labour riots at the Karnaphuli Paper Mill and Adamjee Jute Mill. They were also tasked with interdicting smuggling from Eastern Pakistan to India. Despite some success, they were unable to rein in the illicit trade.

In 1958, the force was reorganized as the East Pakistan Rifles (EPR). At this point anti-smuggling and border protection were formally added to their duties alongside internal security. That same year major Tufail Mohammad of the Pakistan Army who was stationed at EPR sector around Sylhet, died in a border skirmish with the Assam Rifles of India. For his valor during this action he was awarded the highest military award of Pakistan, the 'Nishan-e-Haider'. During the Indo-Pakistani War of 1965, the EPR fought Indian forces successfully at Asalong, Mouja in the Chittagong Hill Tracts. The EPR were used to help police suppress the 1962 East Pakistan Education movement and the 1969 East Pakistan mass uprising, beating students and opening fire on them on several occasions.

==== Bangladesh Liberation War ====
During the Bangladesh liberation war, nearly 9,000 members of the East Pakistan Rifles turned against the Pakistan Army following the Declaration of Independence of Bangladesh in 1971 starting from Kalurghat Radio Station, Chittagong. 817 Bengali EPR personnel reported to be killed in action. The East Pakistan Rifles were the border security and anti-smuggling force stationed in what was to become independent Bangladesh. It was commanded by Junior Commissioned Officers (JCO) at the company level. All EPR companies were based within 8 kilometres (5 mi) of the international boundary. There were two senior commissioned officers, seconded from the Pakistan Army in command of each Wing (battalion) of the EPR. In March 1971, there were 12 EPR Wings. The entire force according to CIA estimates had 10,000 enlisted personnel. However, other sources claim that the EPR had 16 wings and 13,000 to 16,000 personnel.

At the outbreak of the Bangladesh War, the EPR were the first Bengali military unit to defect from Pakistani forces; moving to Sholashahar and the main military cantonment, while calling on all Bengali soldiers to join them. Reportedly West Pakistani officers serving with the EPR were executed by their Bengali colleagues. On 26 March, the Pakistan Army sent troops to suppress the EPR but, pro-independence EPR members ambushed them, killing 72 Pakistani troops and wounding many but the Pakistanis encircled them. As a result, the EPR took heavy losses but managed to retreat. Two personnel from the EPR, Nur Mohammad Sheikh and Munshi Abdur Rouf were awarded Bir Sreshtho the highest gallantry award of Bangladesh posthumously due to their sacrifice for the independence of the country.

=== Bangladesh ===
==== Bangladesh Rifles ====
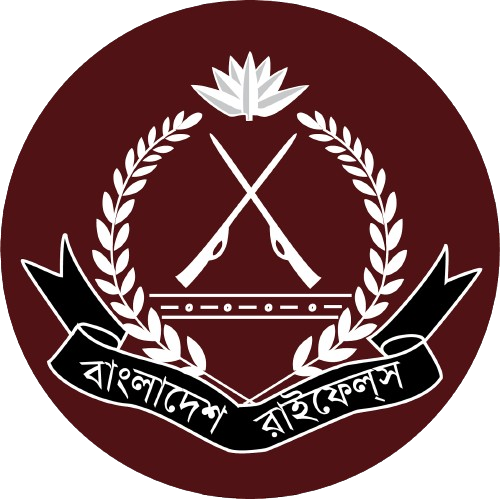
Insignia of Bangladesh Rifles till 2011

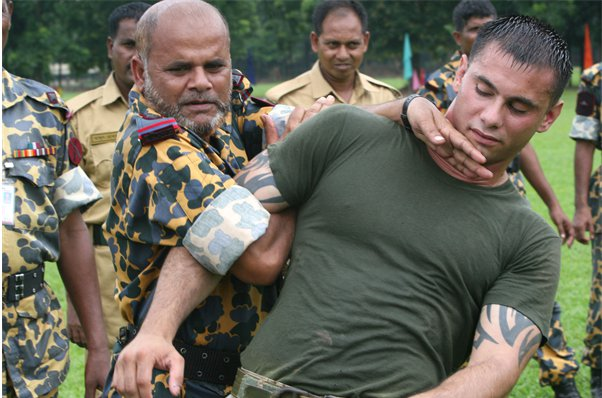
a United States Marine rehearsing a BDR senior warrant officer in 2007.

On 29 January 1972, the East Pakistan Rifles were renamed the Bangladesh Rifles with the officers seconded from Bangladesh Army. Initially with force of 9,000 personnel in early 1972, Sheikh Mujibur Rahman on general M. A. G. Osmani's suggestion, putted Bangladesh Rifles's directorate directly under army headquarters with orchestration of general Osmani in spite the force's jurisdiction was under the Ministry of Home Affairs. The BDR soldiers were dissatisfied with this prejudice and the excessive government funds going to Jatiya Rakkhi Bahini for curbing out the ongoing insurgency, and revolted on 15 February 1972. Rahman then uninstalled BDR directorate from army headquarters and appointed brigadier general Chitta Ranjan Dutta as the inaugural director general of BDR. By 1973 the size of BDR increased to 20,000 under Dutta's administration. Bangladesh Rifles and Indian Border Security Forces exchanged fire near the Comilla-Tripura border throughout the entire month of November 1979. In 1996, Bangladesh Rifles personnel had grown to 67 thousand.

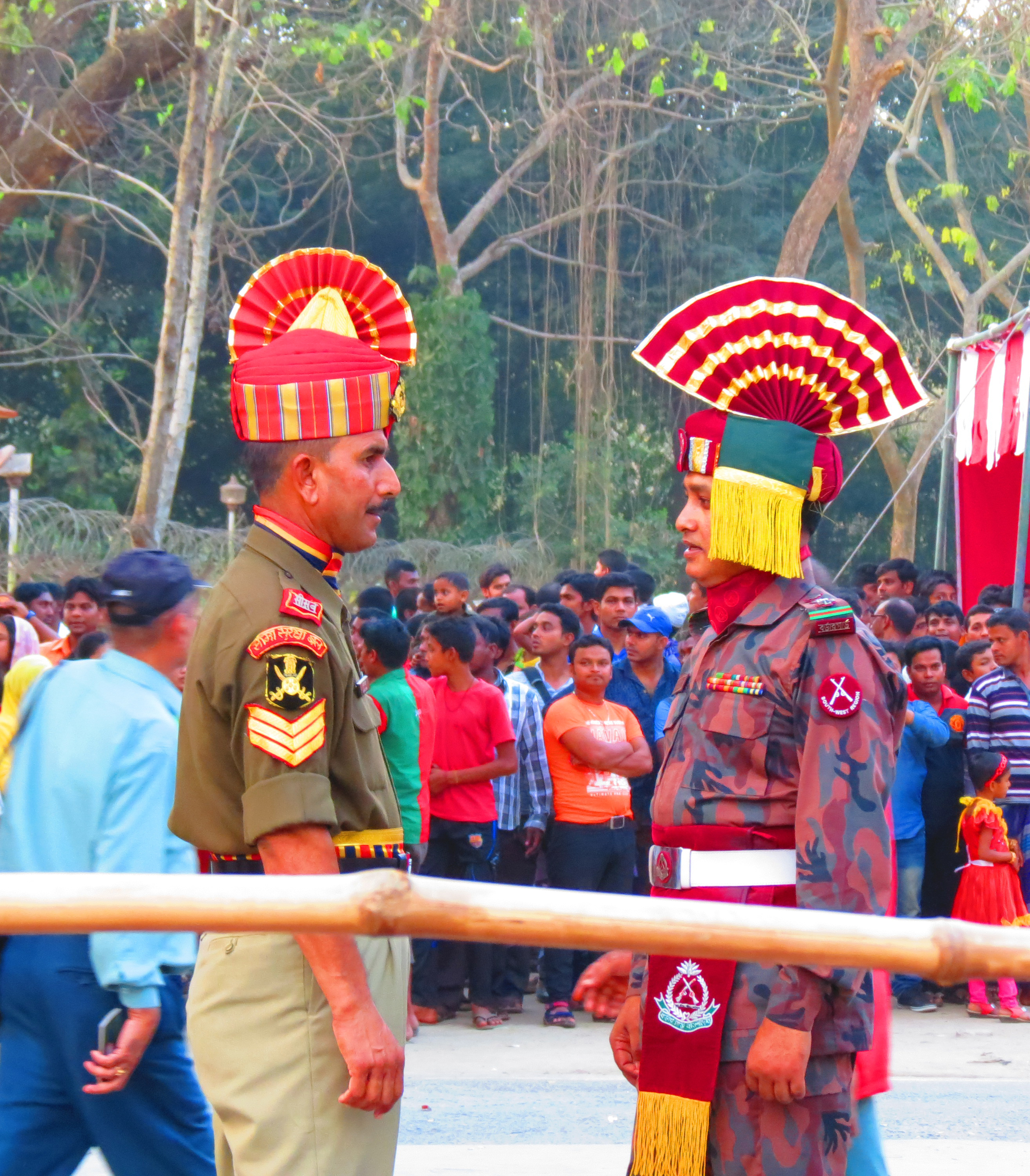
a BGB personnel interacting with a BSF personnel during the Benapole–Petrapole border ceremony.

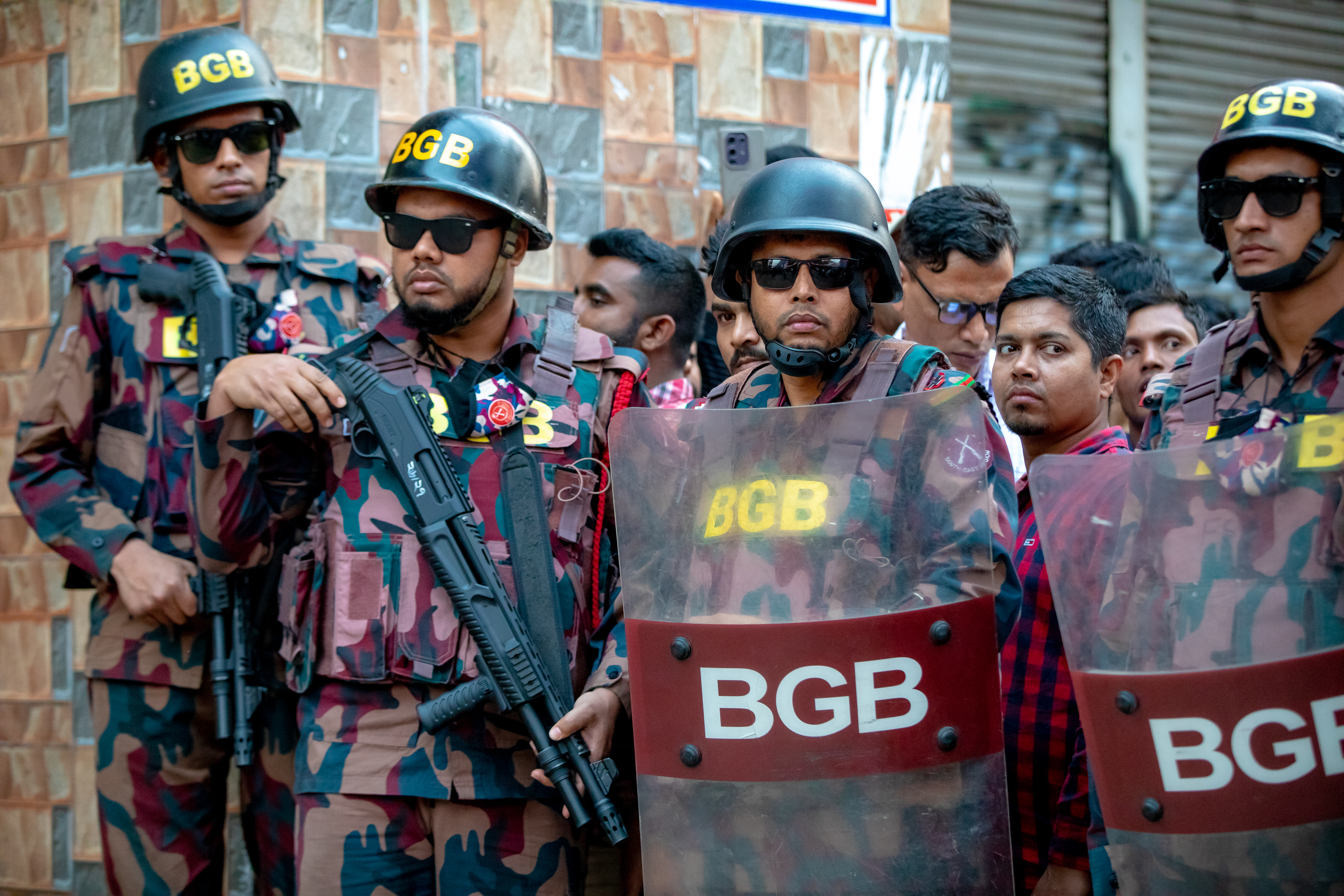
Border Guard Bangladesh - BGB

==== 2001 Bangladesh–India border clashes ====
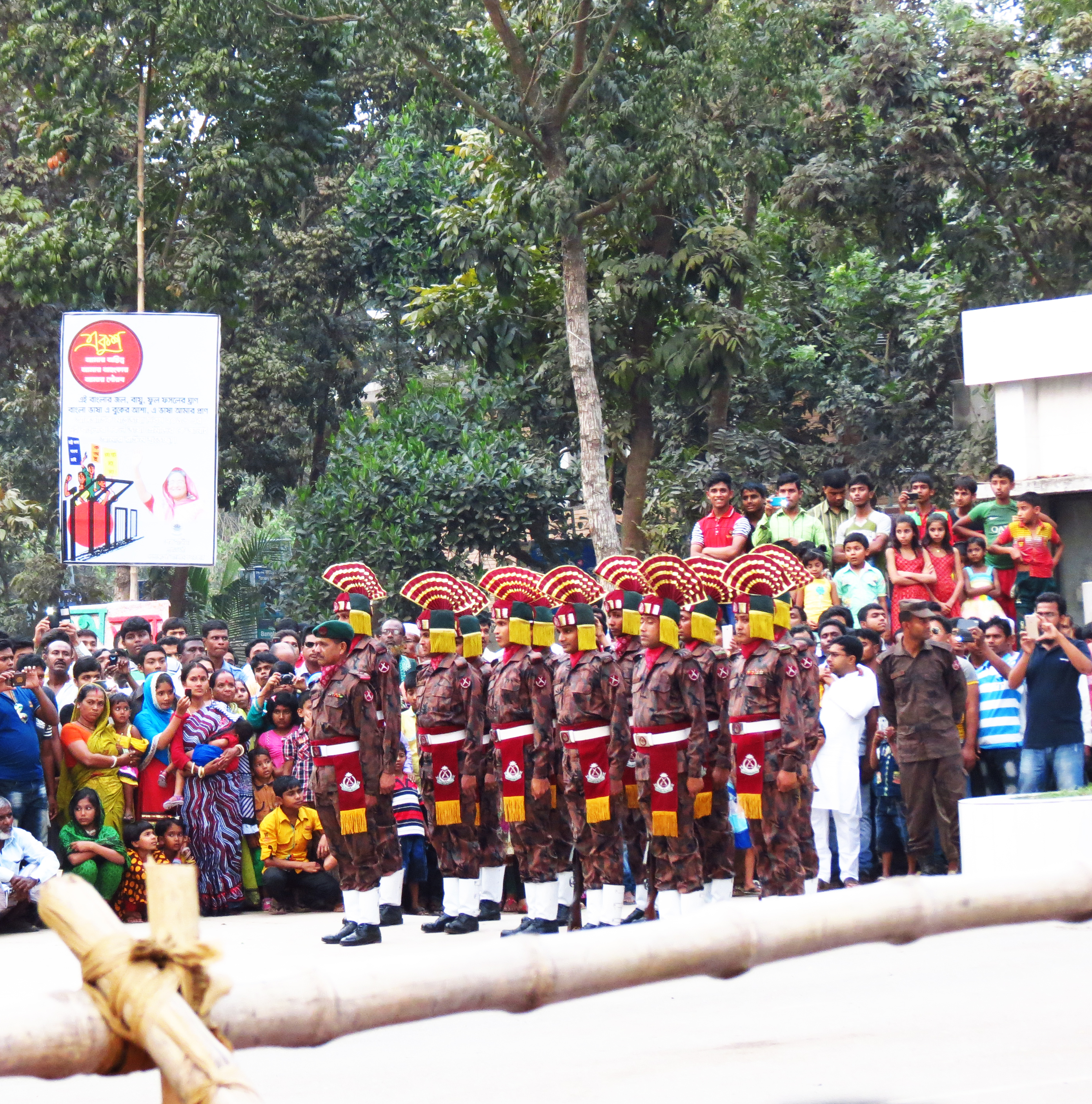
BGB personnel at Benapole.

The 2001 Indian–Bangladeshi border conflict took place in the third week of April 2001 between the Bangladesh Rifles and the Indian Border Security Force on the poorly marked international border between the two countries. This was the worst border conflict Bangladesh was involved in since Independence. The 16–19 April fighting took place around the village of Padua (known as Pyrdiwah in India), which adjoins the Indian state of Meghalaya and Timbil area of the Bangladesh border in Sylhet district. In that area, 6.5 kilometres of the border have remained in dispute for the past 30 years. The trigger for the clash appears to have been an attempt by Indian forces to construct a footpath from an army outpost in Padua across a disputed territory some 300 metres wide to Indian Meghalaya. On 15 April 2001, the BDR captured Pyrdiwah village. Both sides later deescalated and returned to the original positions on the border. This incident left 16 Indian Border Security Force paramilitary men dead and 3 Bangladesh Rifles men dead with 5 other BDR troops injured.

On 19 April 2005, two BSF personnel were killed in an encounter with Bangladesh Rifles inside Bangladeshi territory. According to Bangladeshi sources, BSF personnel entered Bangladesh without uniforms and attacked a village. According to India, they were dragged into Bangladesh and knifed to death.

==== 2009 Bangladesh Rifles Revolt ====
On 25 February 2009, soldiers and junior commissioned officers of Bangladesh rifles with alleged assurances from Sheikh Fazle Noor Taposh who was the then Member of Parliament for Dhaka-12, revolted against their administration resulted in deaths of 57 military officers of the army including director general Shakil Ahmed. The mutiny took place when senior commanders were in Dhaka for convocation or durbar. A total of 74 people were killed in the mutiny. The cause and scheme of this revolt remained under investigation as of 2025, though resentment at officers being seconded from Bangladesh army and allegations of corruption are believed to have been among the tenets.

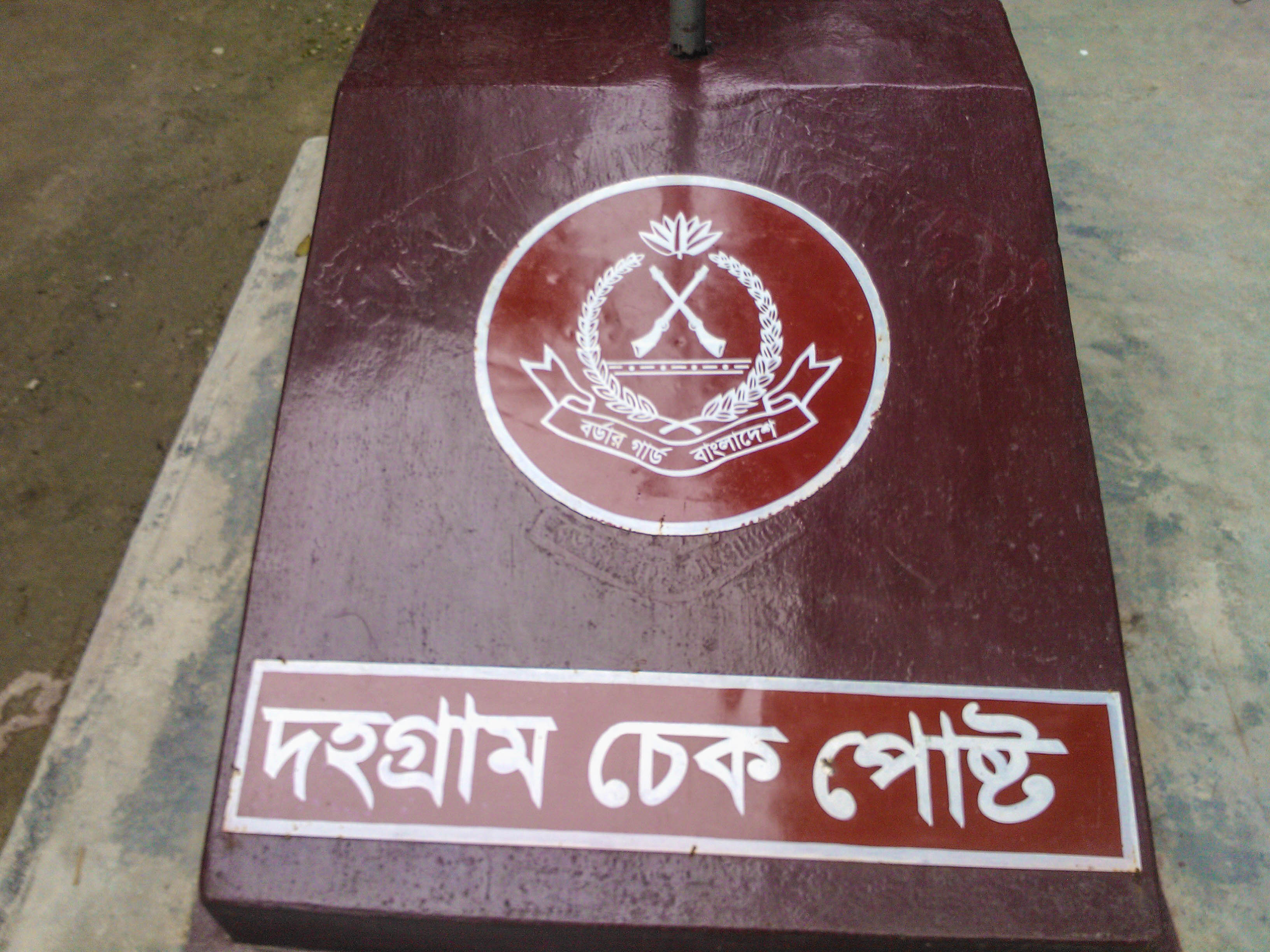
BGB outpost in Dahagram, Rangpur Division.

After 30 hours of being surrounded by Bangladesh Army tanks, the mutineers surrendered with about 6,000 of them taken under arrest, ending the mutiny. In November 2013, Bangladesh sentenced 152 mutineers from Bangladesh Rifles to death. On 1 September 2024, a discussion titled Pilkhana Carnage: Hasina and India's Conspiracy was held at the Dhaka Reporters Unity after the July uprising. Speakers at the event claimed that Sheikh Hasina and the 22nd Indian Ministry were involved in orchestrating the revolt at the Pilkhana headquarters of Bangladesh Rifles. They called for a new investigation into the incident and on 15 December 2024, the Ministry of Home Affairs informed the High Court that it would not establish a commission to re-investigate the BDR revolt, prompting public criticism. On 17 December same year, student movement representatives, including Mahin Sarker, Hasnat Abdullah, and Sarjis Alam, announced plans for nationwide protests if a commission was not formed. On 23 December, the Ministry of Home Affairs subsequently created a seven-member commission to re-investigate the case.

==== Border Guard Bangladesh ====
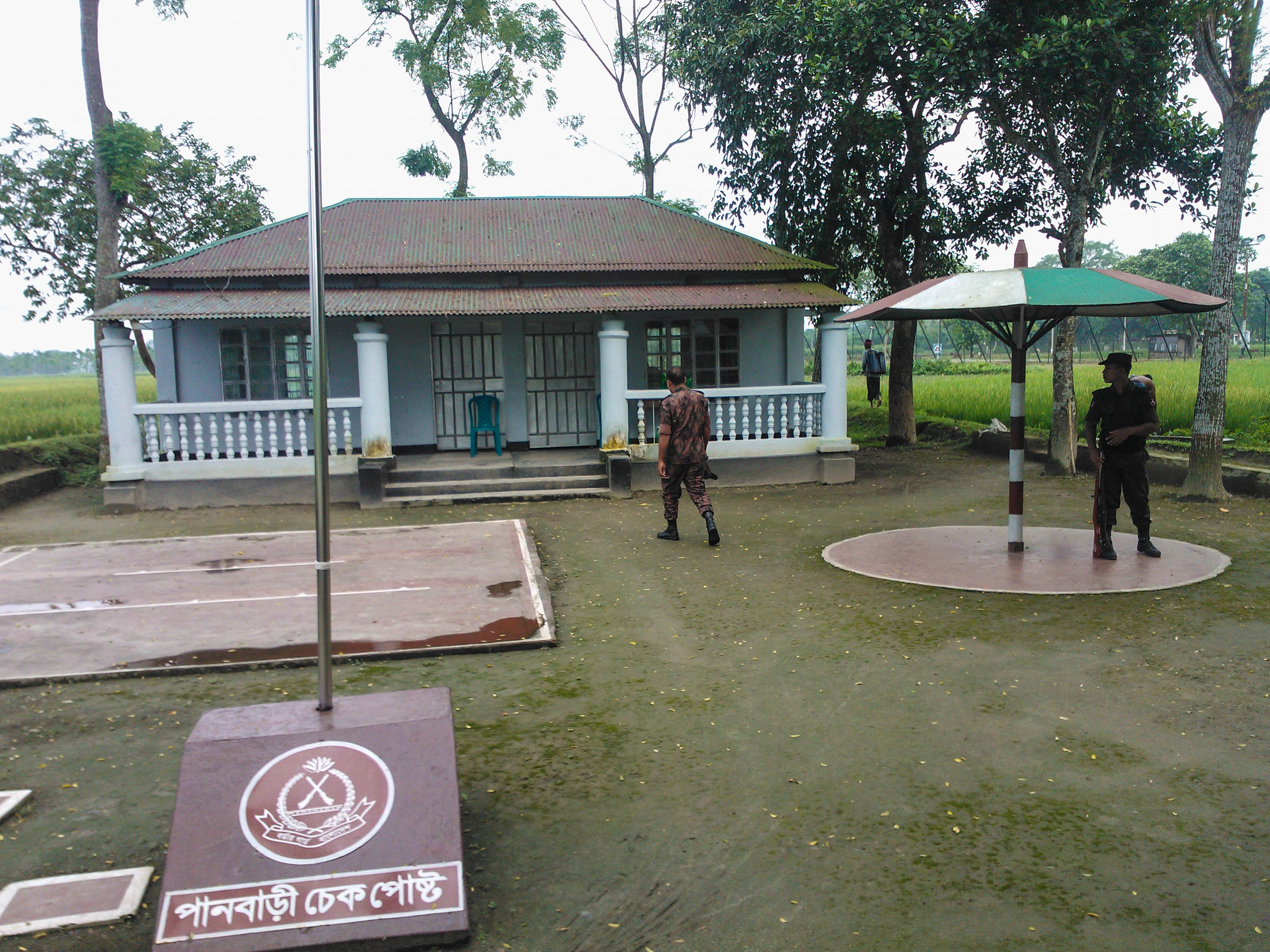
BGB outpost in Patgram, Rangpur Division.

In the aftermath of the mutiny, the Border Guard Bangladesh Act was issued in 2010 and the Bangladesh Rifles was reorganised with new recruits. The force is still commanded by senior officers seconded from the Bangladesh Army. The Bangladesh Rifles have gone through some fundamental changes since 2010. It was officially renamed as the Border Guard Bangladesh (BGB) on 23 January 2011 and reorganised with fresh recruits, also formed their own intelligence unit. The Border Guard Bangladesh Act, 2010 increased the maximum punishment for mutiny from 7 years in jail to the death penalty.

News reports in 2018 stated the BGB had "54,000 troopers". The 2020 edition of The Military Balance put the force's personnel strength at 38,000, organized in 54 battalions and one riverine company. The force has initiated recruitment of female soldiers from 2016.

==== Bangladesh–Myanmar border skirmish in 2014 ====
On 28 May 2014, during a routine patrol of BGB in Bandarban District, along the Bangladesh-Myanmar border, Myanmar Border Police began firing on BGB patrols. The incident took the life of Border Guard Corporal Mizanur Rahman (43). The body of the slain soldier was then carried over the border by Myanmar Border Police. On 30 May upon request of the Myanmar Ambassador to Bangladesh, a BGB team was waiting near border pillar no. 52 for identification of the dead body which was proposed by the Myanmar side. However, to the complete surprise of BGB, Myanmar border forces suddenly started firing on the waiting BGB team without any provocation resulting in the BGB team returning fire. Both sides deescalated and agreed to a ceasefire and on the following day, Myanmar returned the dead body of BGB Corporal Mizanur Rahman. Bangladesh's Ministry of Foreign Affairs had protested strongly to the Burmese ambassador over the unprovoked eruption of gunfire by Burmese border troops.

==== Bangladesh–Arakan Army border clash 2015 ====
On 26 August 2015, the Arakan Army, a separatist group in Myanmar, attacked a BGB patroller in Boro Modak, Thanchi, Bandarban. Two border guards were injured in the attack. On 11 May 2015, the BGB camp in Thanchi came under mortar fire, BGB retaliated by firing two rounds towards the border BSF agreed to allow BGB to use BSF roads in India to patrol the border on 1 August 2016. On 15 November 2016, Border Guard Bangladesh stopped 86 Rohingyas from entering Bangladesh on two boats. On 6 February 2017, BGB protested against the Border Guard Police, after they shot and killed a Bangladeshi fisherman in the Naf River. BGB deployed its first female border guards on 24 February 2017 in the Dinajpur border area. BGB and Myanmar Police Force came to an agreement on 6 April 2017 to remove mines from the border area.

== Decorations ==
The then-East Pakistan Rifles joined the Bangladesh War of Independence on the side of Mukti Bahini in 1971. One hundred and forty one members earned gallantry awards for their outstanding contributions to the independence war of Bangladesh. 2 earned Bir Sreshtho 8 earned Bir Uttom, 40 earned Bir Bikrom and 91 earned Bir Protik.

=== Medals ===
These medals were awarded to members of Bangladesh Rifles (BDR) until 2009 for their bravery.

Name	Ribbon	Medal	Description
Bangladesh Rifles Padak			This medal was awarded to members of Bangladesh Rifles for their incomparable bravery.
President Rifles Padak			This medal was awarded to members of Bangladesh Rifles for their bravery.

The border guard medals are intended for awarding members of Border Guard Bangladesh.

Name	Ribbon	Medal	Description
Border Guard Bangladesh Medal (BGBM)			This medal is awarded to members of BGB for their incomparable bravery.
President Border Guard Medal (PBGM)			This medal is awarded to members of BGB for their bravery.
Border Guard Bangladesh Medal Service (BGBMS)			This medal is awarded to members of BGB for their incomparable service.
President Border Guard Medal Service (PBGMS)			This medal is awarded to members of BGB for their service.
Border Guard Obodan Medal (BGOM)			This medal is awarded to members of BGB who have contributed to the force but have not received any of the gallantry medals.

Other medals of Border Guard Bangladesh

Name	Ribbon	Medal	Description
BGB Punargathan Padak			BGB Punargathan Padak (BGB Rebuilding medal) was awarded to the individuals who contributed in the reformation of the force.
BGB Service Medal			This medal is awarded to the officers of Bangladesh Army who have worked in BGB.
Shimanto Padak			This medal is awarded to members of BGB.
BGB Gourob Chinho Padak			
Rokto Rin Padak			
Rokto Snat Padak			
BGB Seniority Medal-1			This medal is awarded to members of BGB for 10 years of service.
BGB Seniority Medal-2			This medal is awarded to members of BGB for 20 years of service.
BGB Seniority Medal-3			This medal is awarded to members of BGB for 27 years of service.

== Responsibilities ==
- Patrolling and securing the border
- Investigating cross border crimes
- Anti-Smuggling Operations
- Counter Terrorism
- Domestic law enforcement during national emergencies
- Acting as a reserve force under Ministry of Defence during war

== Equipment ==
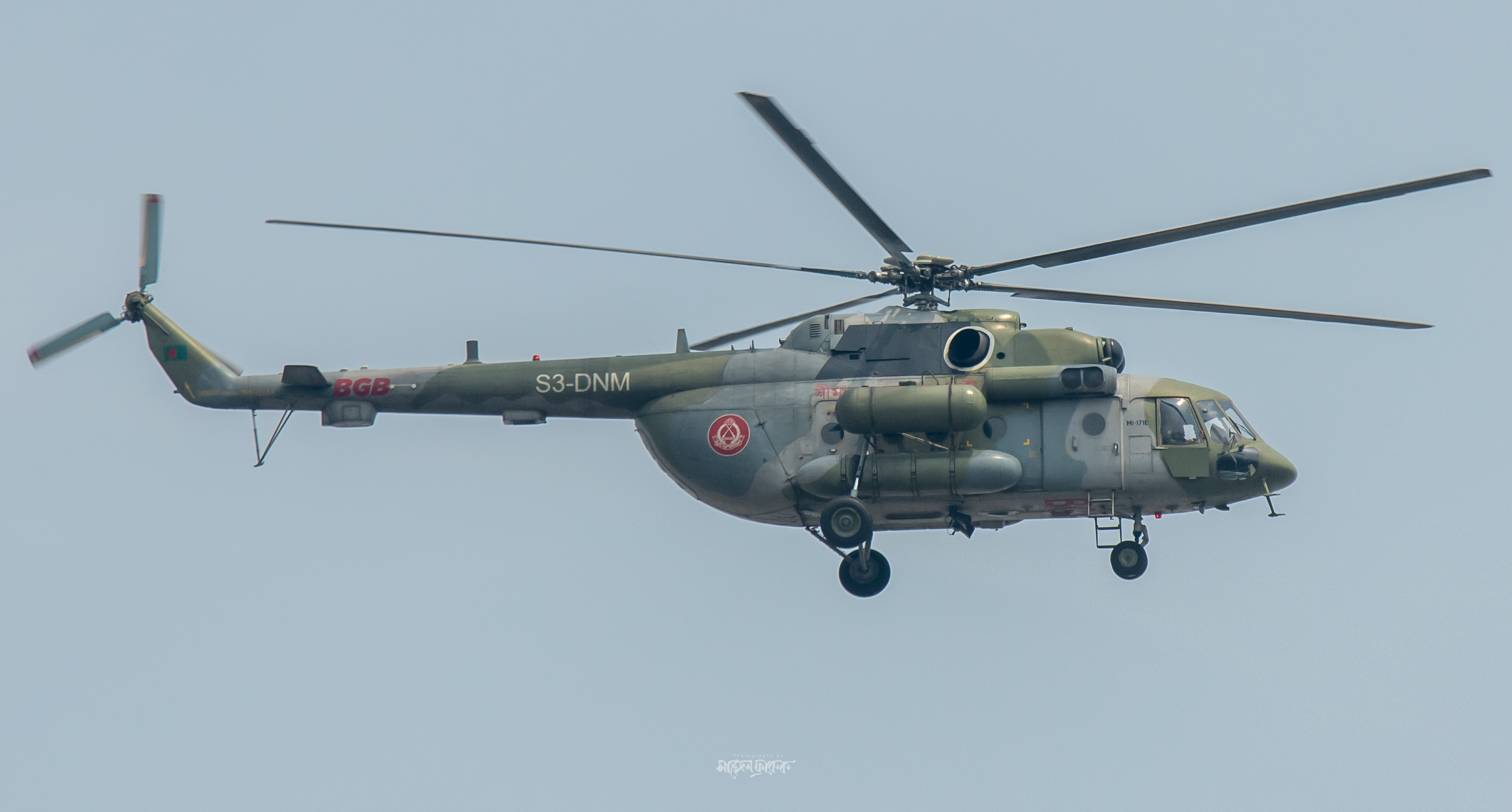
Mil Mi-171E of Border Guard Bangladesh

== Rank structure ==
BGB ranks are:

- Director General
- Additional Director General
- Deputy Director General
- Director
- Additional Director
- Deputy Director
- Assistant Director
- Subedar Major
- Subedar
- Naib Subedar
- Havildar
- Naik
- Lance Naik
- Sepoy

== Organization ==
Border Guard Bangladesh is directed by director general who is a two star officer of Bangladesh Army. Most of the Border Guard Administration are governed by officers posted from the army. There are, however, around 100 officers who are promoted from within the force itself. They can be promoted as high as deputy director (equivalent to captain in Bangladesh Army).

The force is structured with five regional headquarters who reports to the director general at Pilkhana. Each of the regions are commanded by a regional commander who are one star officers from the army. Under regional headquarters, there are a total of 17 sectors. The sectors are commanded by colonels. Under each sectors, there are multiple battalions which are commanded by lieutenant colonels. A battalion has six rifle companies, one support company and one HQ company. Army officers of the rank of captain command the companies and officers of the rank of major fill billets of battalion second-in-command, adjutant, battalion intelligence officer and staff positions in Pilkhana HQ and the training establishments. However one-third of company commanders are promotee BGB officers holding the rank of assistant director (equivalent to captain). This is the second-highest rank achievable for a BGB departmental officer. A subedar usually holds the responsibility of the company second-in-command and company quartermaster. Each company has four platoons and each platoon is led by a naib subedar, with a havildar as second-in-command. The highest rank for a promotee BGB soldiers, deputy director (major equivalent), fill the billets of battalion adjutant and battalion logistics officers. The subedar-major (lieutenant equivalent) similarly fills the billets of battalion subedar major (ceremonial post) and head instructors in training establishments and depots. Each Platoon has three sections and each section is commanded by a Naik, with a Lance naik as second-in-command. Each section has two to three teams and the team is led by a lance naik. A BGB personnel is not eligible to lead sections, platoons and companies or hold posts of second-in-command if they are over 40 years of age and those in such positions receive additional 'command allowance'. Its current strength is 70,000 structured along 64 battalions and numerous border outposts (BOP), mostly along the borders.

- BGB Headquarters: Pilkhana, Dhaka
  - Director General
    - Additional Director General (Headquarters)
      - Deputy Director General (Records)
      - Deputy Director General (Logistics)
    - Additional Director General (Operations and Training)
      - Deputy Director General (Communications)
      - Commandant - Border Guard Training Centre and College
    - Additional Director General (Administration)
      - Deputy Director General (Budget)
      - Deputy Director General (Central Purchase)
      - Deputy Director General (Construction Works)
    - Additional Director General (Medical)
    - Additional Director General (Border Security Bureau)
    - Sector Command - Dhaka
- North Eastern Region: Sarail, Brahmanbaria, Chattogram
  - Region Commander
    - Sector Command - Cumilla
    - Sector Command - Mymensingh
    - Sector Command - Sreemangal
    - Sector Command - Sylhet
    - Regional Intelligence Bureau - Sarail
- North Western Region: Rangpur City, Rangpur
  - Region Commander
    - Sector Command - Dinajpur
    - Sector Command - Rajshahi
    - Sector Command - Rangpur
    - Sector Command - Thakurgaon
    - Regional Intelligence Bureau - Rangpur
- South Eastern Region: Halishahar, Chattogram
  - Region Commander
    - Sector Command - Rangamati
    - Sector Command - Khagrachari
    - Sector Command - Guimara
    - Reserve Battalion - Chattagram
    - Regional Intelligence Bureau - Halishahar
- South Western Regional: Jashore, Khulna
  - Region Commander
    - Sector Command - Kushtia
    - Sector Command - Khulna
    - Regional Intelligence Bureau - Jashore
- Cox's Bazar Region: Cox's Bazar, Chattogram
  - Region Commander
    - Sector Command - Ramu
    - Sector Command - Bandarban
    - Regional Intelligence Bureau - Cox's Bazar

== Future modernization programme ==
BGB has adopted a long term modernization plan named "BGB Vision 2041" in 2017. The plan intends to make BGB a well-trained, well-equipped and technologically advanced force.

In short terms, BGB plans for structural and manpower expansion. A new region (equivalent to division) will be raised in Ramu of Cox's Bazar. Three new sectors (equivalent to brigades) will be raised at Ali Kadam of Bandarban, Naogaon and Jessore. Eight new battalions will be formed at Jhikargacha of Jessore, Meherpur, Khagrachari, Boro Mowdok of Bandarban, Gazipur, Narayanganj and Kulaura. Two riverine battalions will be raised in BGB at Nildumur of Shatkhira and Teknaf of Cox's Bazar. They are the first two units of BGB who will be able to operate in riverine borders and chars (River island). The number of personnel will be increased from 50,000 to 65.000 soon. 124 Border Out Posts (BOP) and 70 heli-support BOPs are being set up in the border areas of hilly districts along the border with Myanmar. 128 Border Sentri Posts (BSP) are being constructed between the distant BOPs. BGB members are being equipped with bulletproof vests and ballistic helmet.

A Quick Response Force will be established for BGB. The force will work to supply modern arms and ammunition swiftly to border points in case of any emergency. For smooth operation in the border areas, border roads are being constructed. In BGB day 2017, the then prime minister of Bangladesh, Sheikh Hasina said that the government has undertaken a plan to construct a total of 3,167 km ring road across the borders with India and Myanmar.

BGB has already bought two Mi-171E helicopters from Russia for its aviation wing at a cost of Tk. 355.10 crore.

BGB has initiated a technological modernization program aimed at establishing "3I" (Information, Identification, and Intervention) capabilities within its border management framework. This strategy involves the deployment of integrated surveillance systems, including infrared sensors, night-vision equipment, and closed-circuit television cameras, to monitor border zones. Future expansion of this initiative includes the integration of radar systems and satellite monitoring facilities to enhance long-term situational awareness and intelligence gathering.

Under the Premiership of Tarique Rahman, the BGB has started using drones for better surveillance. On September 1, 2026, home minister Salahuddin Ahmed inaugurated the School of Border Surveillance and Drone Warfare, a specialised training institute for training soldiers regarding drones.

== See also ==
- Indian influence in Bangladesh
