= List of ports in Bangladesh =

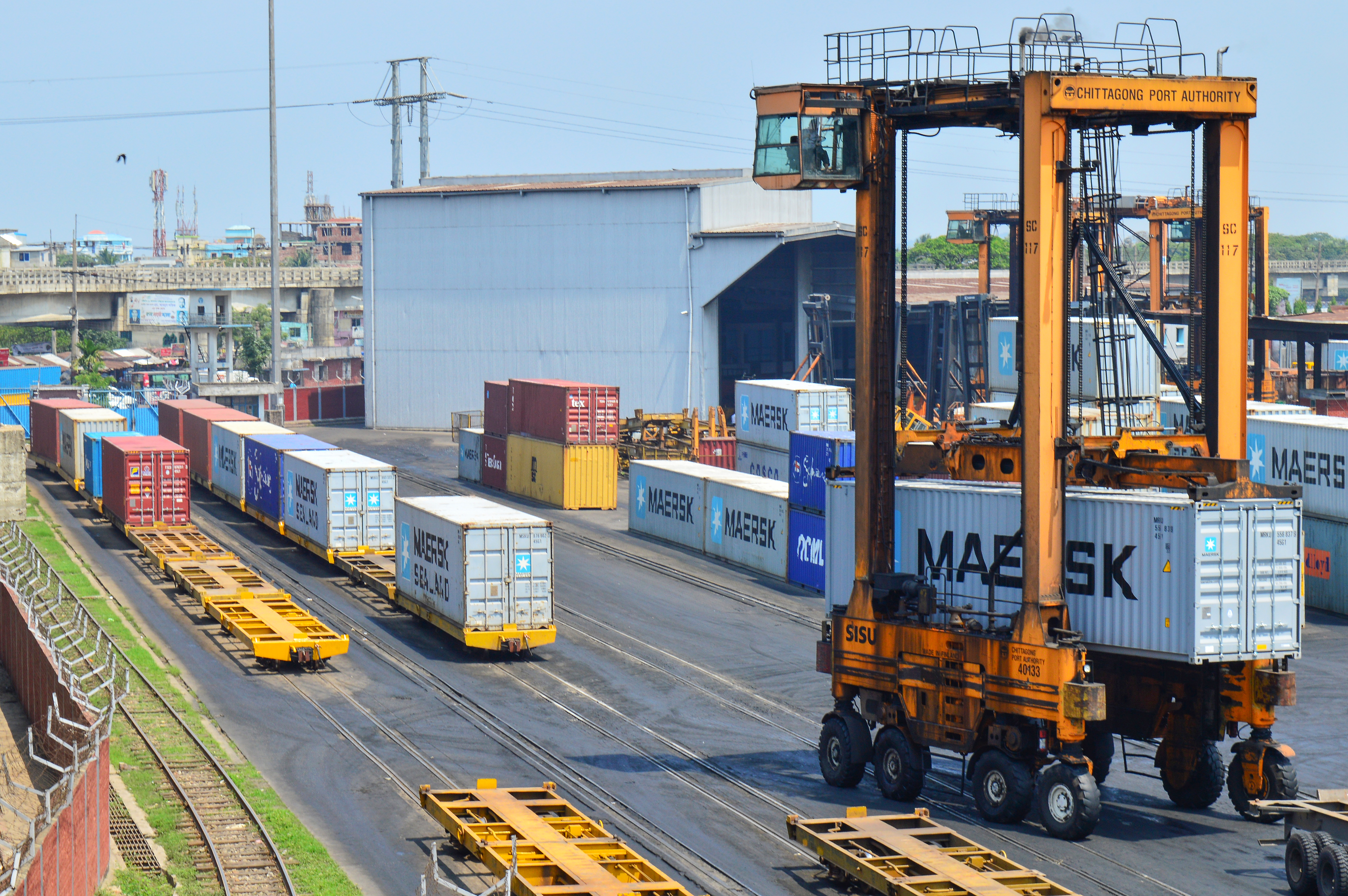
Port of Chittagong

Bangladesh is a riverine country located in South Asia with a coastline of 580 km (360 mi) on the northern littoral of the Bay of Bengal. The delta plain of the Ganges (Padma), Brahmaputra (Jamuna), and Meghna Rivers and their tributaries occupy 79 percent of the country.

== Sea ports ==
Port name	Image	Location	Type	Status	Authority
Port of Chittagong	1887 Chittagong port	Chattogram	Large Sea Port (Major Port)	Active	Chittagong Port Authority
Port of Mongla	Mongla Port 1950	Bagerhat, Khulna	Large sea Port(Major Port)	Active	Mongla Port Authority
Port of Payra		Patuakhali, Barishal	Sea Port (Minor Port)	Active	Payra Port Authority
Matarbari Port		Cox's Bazar, Chattogram	Deep Sea Port		Chittagong Port Authority

== Inland ports ==
Port name	River	Location	Opened	Status	Authority
Aricha Ghat	Brahmaputra	Manikganj	1983	Active	BIWTA
Port of Chandpur	Meghna	Chandpur	unknown(more than thousand year)	Active	BIWTA
Port of Ashuganj	Meghna	Ashuganj	2004	Active	BIWTA
Port of Barisal	Kirtankhola	Barisal	18th century	Active	BIWTA
Port of Narayanganj	Shitalakshya	Narayanganj	1862	Active	BIWTA
Port of Dhaka	Buriganga	Dhaka	17th century	Active	BIWTA
Port of Pangaon	Buriganga	Keraniganj	2013	Active	BIWTA
Port of Khulna	Bhairab	Khulna	1960	Active	BIWTA
Faridpur River Port	Padma	Faridpur		Active	BIWTA
Port of Noapara	Bhairab	Jashore	2004	Active	BIWTA
Baghabari River Port	Jamuna	Sirajganj	1981	Active	BIWTA
Tongi River Port	Turag	Tongi		Active	BIWTA
Chilmari River Port	Brahmaputra	Kurigram		Re-Construction	BIWTA
Patuakhali River Port	Payra	Patuakhali			
Bhola River port	Meghna	Bhola			
Daulatdia River Port	Padma	Rajbari			
Lakshmipur River Port	Meghna	Moju Chowdhury Hat		Planned	

== Land ports ==
Port name	Image	Location	Type	Status	Authority
Benapole land port		Benapole, Jashore District	Dry port	Active	Bangladesh Land Port Authority
Hili Land Port		Hili, Dinajpur District	Dry port	Active	Bangladesh Land Port Authority
Bhomra Land Port		Bhomra, Satkhira District	Dry port	Active	Bangladesh Land Port Authority
Akhaura Land Port		Akhaura, Brahmanbaria District	Dry port	Active	Bangladesh Land Port Authority
Tamabil Land Port		Tamabil, Sylhet District	Dry port	Active	Bangladesh Land Port Authority
Banglabandha Land Port		Banglabandha, Panchagarh District	Dry port	Active	Bangladesh Land Port Authority
Teknaf Land Port		Teknaf, Cox's Bazar District	Dry port	Active	Bangladesh Land Port Authority
Darshana land port		Darshana, Chuadanga District	Dry port	Active	Bangladesh Land Port Authority
Mujibnagar Land Port		Mujibnagar, Meherpur District	Dry port	Active	Bangladesh Land Port Authority
Sona Masjid Land Port		Sona Masjid, Chapainawabganj District	Dry port	Active	Bangladesh Land Port Authority
Ramgarh Land Port		Ramgarh, Khagrachari District	Dry port	Active	Bangladesh Land Port Authority
Belonia Land Port		Belonia, Feni District	Dry port	Active	Bangladesh Land Port Authority
Burimari Land Port		Patgram, Lalmonirhat District	Dry port	Active	Bangladesh Land Port Authority
Nakugaon Land Port		Nalitabari, Sherpur District	Dry port	Active	Bangladesh Land Port Authority
