= Land border crossings of Bangladesh =

Border checkpoints of Bangladesh

Bangladesh has sixteen border-crossings or land ports, all of them are with India.

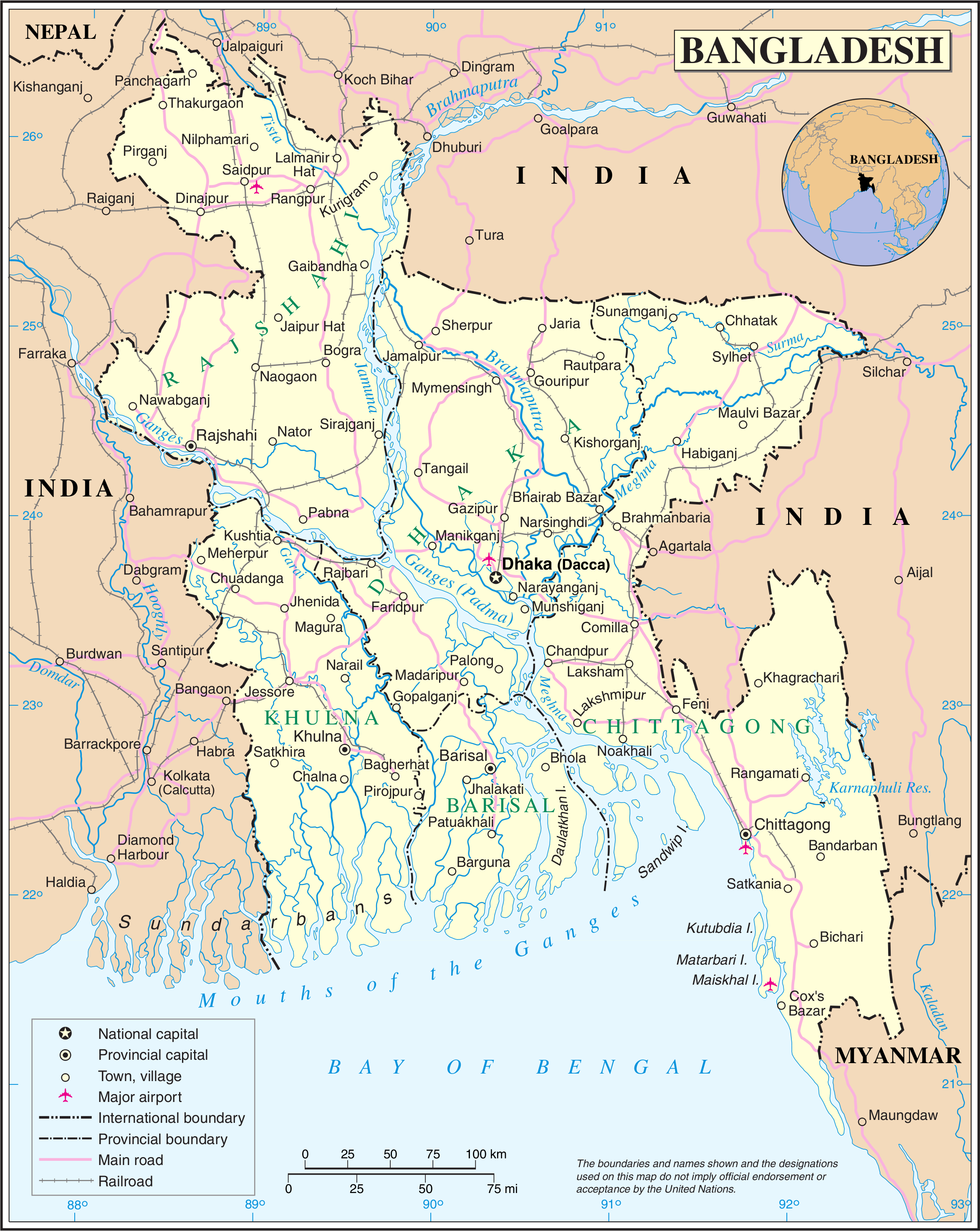
Transport map of Bangladesh

== India ==
Designated Integrated Check Posts (ICP, with both customs and immigration facilities) and Land Customs Stations (LCS) are:

- Khulna Division
  - Kolkata–Dhaka via Petrapole-Benapole integrated checkpost crossing
  - Ranaghat-Kushtia via Darshana -Gede crossing
- Rajshahi Division
  - Malda–Rajshahi via Mahadipur-Sona Masjid crossing
- Rangpur Division
  - Mankachar Land Customs Stations(India) and Rowmari post (Bangladesh)
  - Banglabandha is a major inland port in northern Bangladesh established to provide a trade link with India, Nepal and Bhutan. The three nations are separated by 52 km (32 mi) of Indian territory, known as the Siliguri Corridor. On the Indian side of the border is Phulbari. Border crossing of vehicles between Phulbari and Banglabandha was started in January 2011.
  - Burimari - Chanrabandha integrated checkpost
  - Hili Land Port

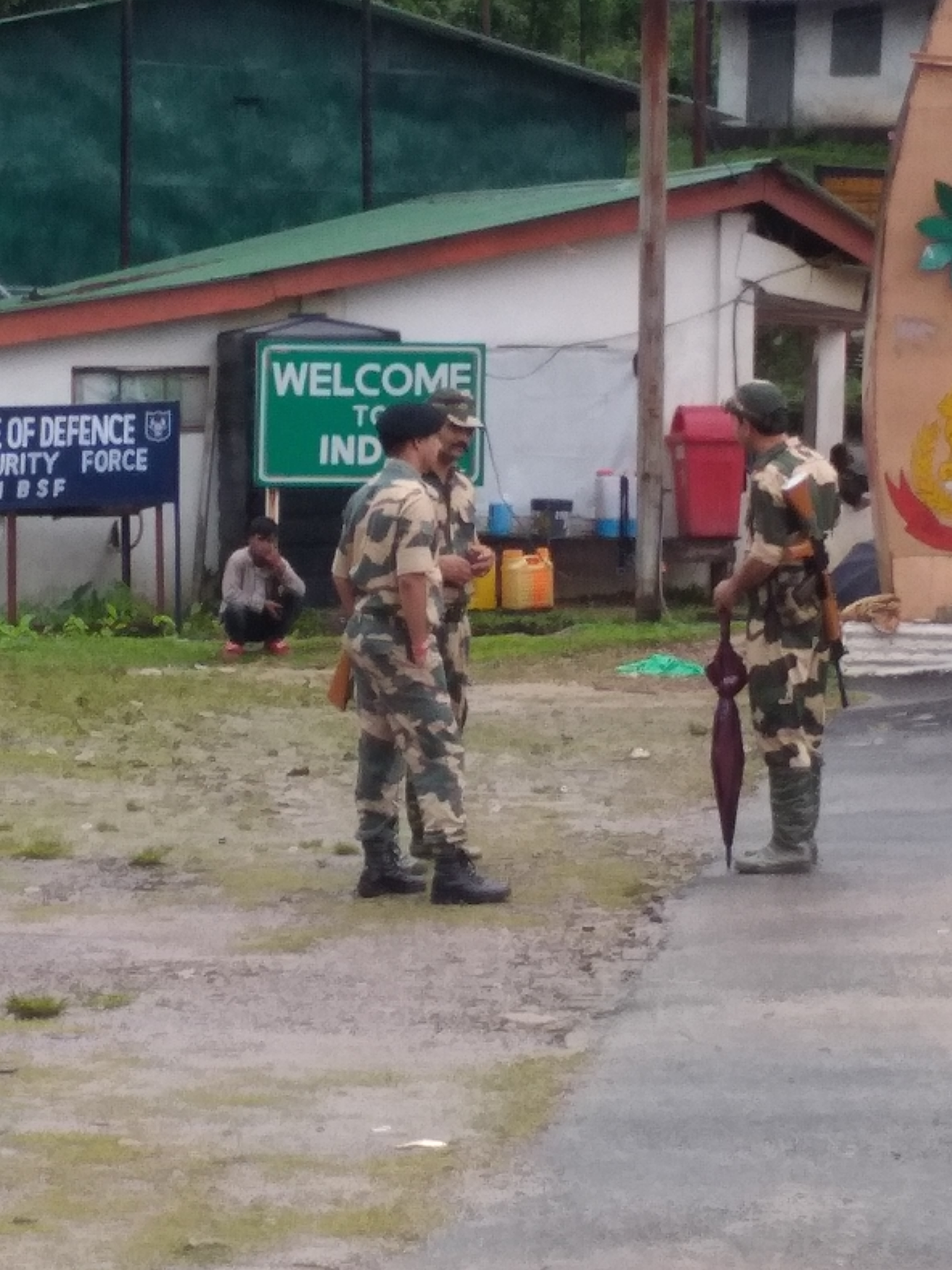
Indian Border Security Force (BSF) jawans guarding Dawki Integrated Check Post or Dawki border crossing. It is one of the few road border crossings between India and Bangladesh in the West Jaintia Hills district in the state of Meghalaya, India, the corresponding post in Bangladesh is Tamabil post.

- Mymensingh Division
  - Bagmara Land Customs Stations (India) and Bijoyour post (Bangladesh)
  - West Garo Hills–Bakshiganj via Mahendraganj crossing on NH12
  - Tura–Nalitabari via Dalu crossing on NH217 (India) and Nakugaon post (Bangladesh)
- Sylhet Division
  - Karimganj Steamer and Ferry Station (KSFS) Land Customs Stations(India) and Zakiganj post (Bangladesh)
  - Karimganj–Beanibazar Upazila via Sutarkandi integrated checkpost crossing on NH37(India) and Sheola post (Bangladesh)
  - Shillong–Sylhet via Dawki-Tamabil integrated checkpost crossing (India) and Tamabil post (Bangladesh)
  - Borsara Land Customs Stations(India) and Borsara post (Bangladesh)
- Chittagong Division
  - Agartala–Dhaka via Akhaura -Agartala integrated checkpost (India) and Akhaura checkpost crossing
  - Santirbazar–Feni via Belonia -Santibazar road and railway crossing in South Tripura district
  - Sabroom–Ramgarh in Chittagong Division via Ramgarh integrated border checkpost crossing Maitri Setu on Feni River
  - Kawarpuchiah integrated checkpost, opened in October 2017 by Prime Minister Narendra Modi.

== Myanmar ==
Currently Bangladesh-Myanmar border is closed.

== See also ==
- Bangladesh–Myanmar border
- Bangladesh–India border
