= Benapole–Petrapole border ceremony =

Joint ceremony at India–Bangladesh border

Benapole-Petrapole border ceremony
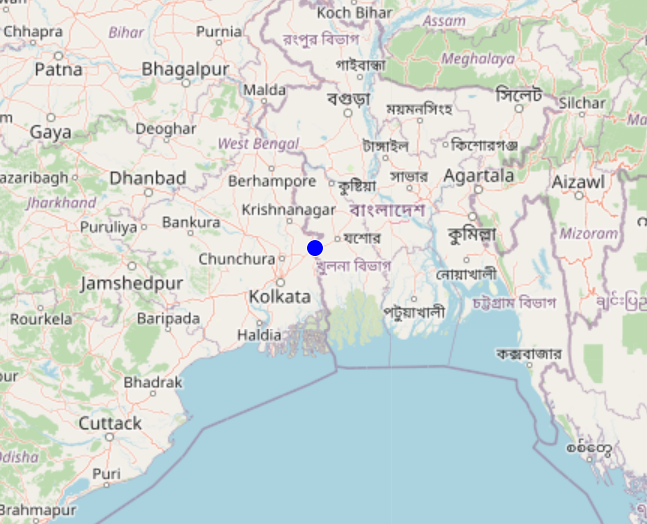
- Petrapole is situated on the national highway 35 (now NH 112)(Jessore Road) between Bangaon, India and Benapole, Bangladesh.
- Status: Active
- Genre: Military display
- Date: Every day
- Frequency: Daily
- Locations: North 24 Parganas, West Bengal
- Coordinates: 23.0365726°N 88.8769483°E
- Country: Bangladesh; India
- Years active: 6 (since 2013)
- Inaugurated: November 6, 2013
- Founders: Border Security Force and Border Guards Bangladesh

The Petrapole-Benapole joint retreat ceremony was inaugurated on 6 November 2013 by the Indian Home Minister at Integrated Check Post (ICP) Petrapole-Benapole in the presence of the Home Minister of Bangladesh. It is a daily military exercise, similar to the Wagah Border ceremony, and engages soldiers of Border Security Force (India) and the Border Guards Bangladesh.

== Events ==
The Petrapole-Benapole border ceremony takes place every evening from 16:30 to 17:00. This joint retreat ceremony of 30 minutes resulting in lowering of national flags of India and Bangladesh is jointly conducted by BSF (Border Security Force) and BGB (Border Guard Bangladesh).

The "Wagah of the East" as it is known, the Petrapole-Benapole border ceremony starts off with opening of gates on India and Bangladesh side. After a quick friendly handshake between the BSF and BGB infantrymen, the soldiers march into the "no man's land" in their respective ceremonial dresses and battle dress uniform. Ceremonial theatrics by the BSF and BGB are at the heart of the ceremony and is attended by Military officials of both countries. The ceremonial parade ends before sunset and the flags of either countries are lowered. The gates on either side of the border are closed for the day.

Since the border retreat ceremony was initiated in 2013, not many tourists are aware of this event. The crowd at the ceremony consists mostly of locals and very few tourists. After the retreat ceremony, the BSF jawans pose for a photo shoot with civilians or tourists in their ceremonial dress.

== Location ==
Petrapole is on the Indian side of the border with Bangladesh. The Bangladesh border point is called Benapole. Petrapole is situated 6 km from Bangaon in the North 24 Parganas district of West Bengal. Petrapole is the largest land custom point in India and Asia.

== Gallery ==
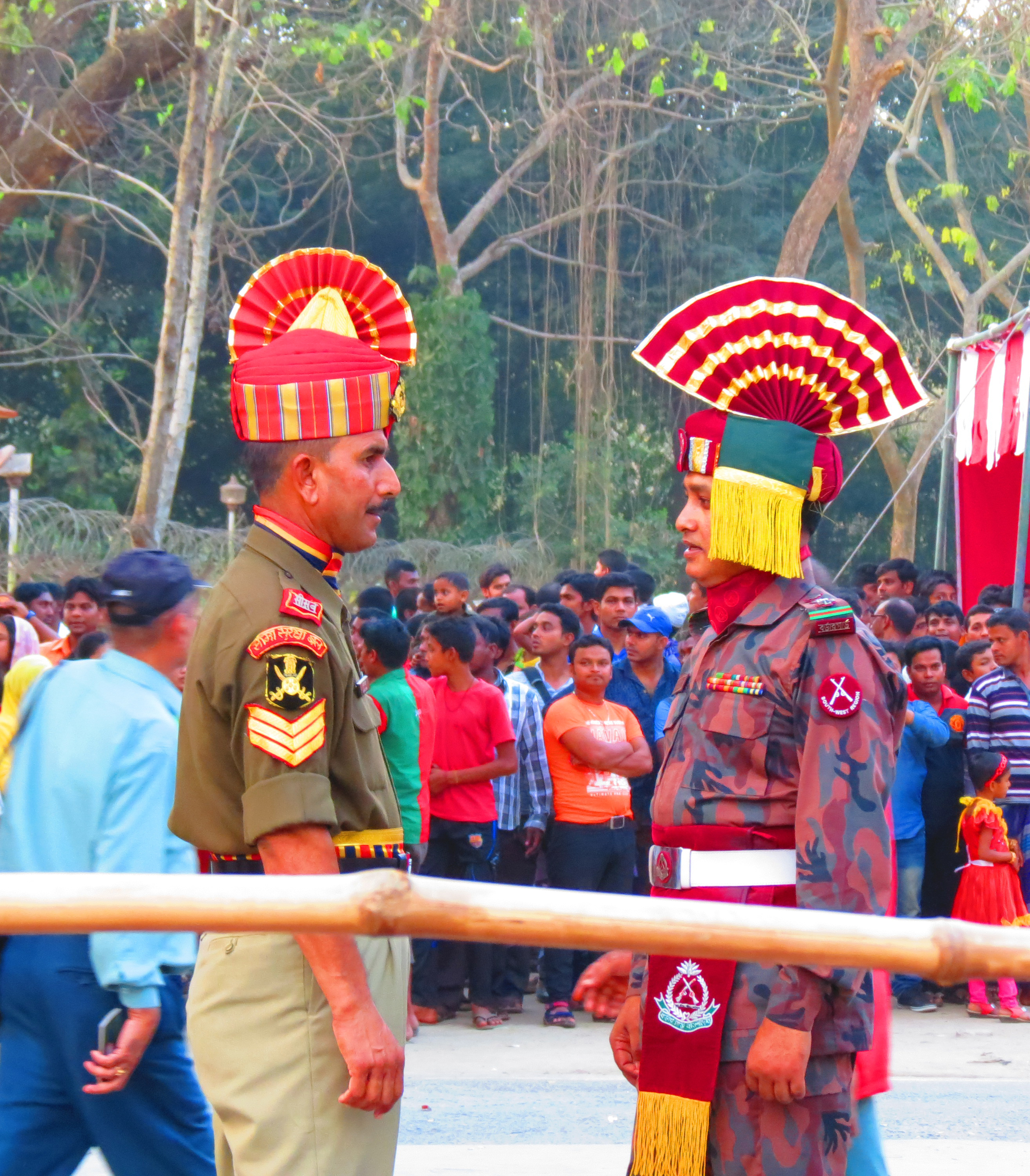

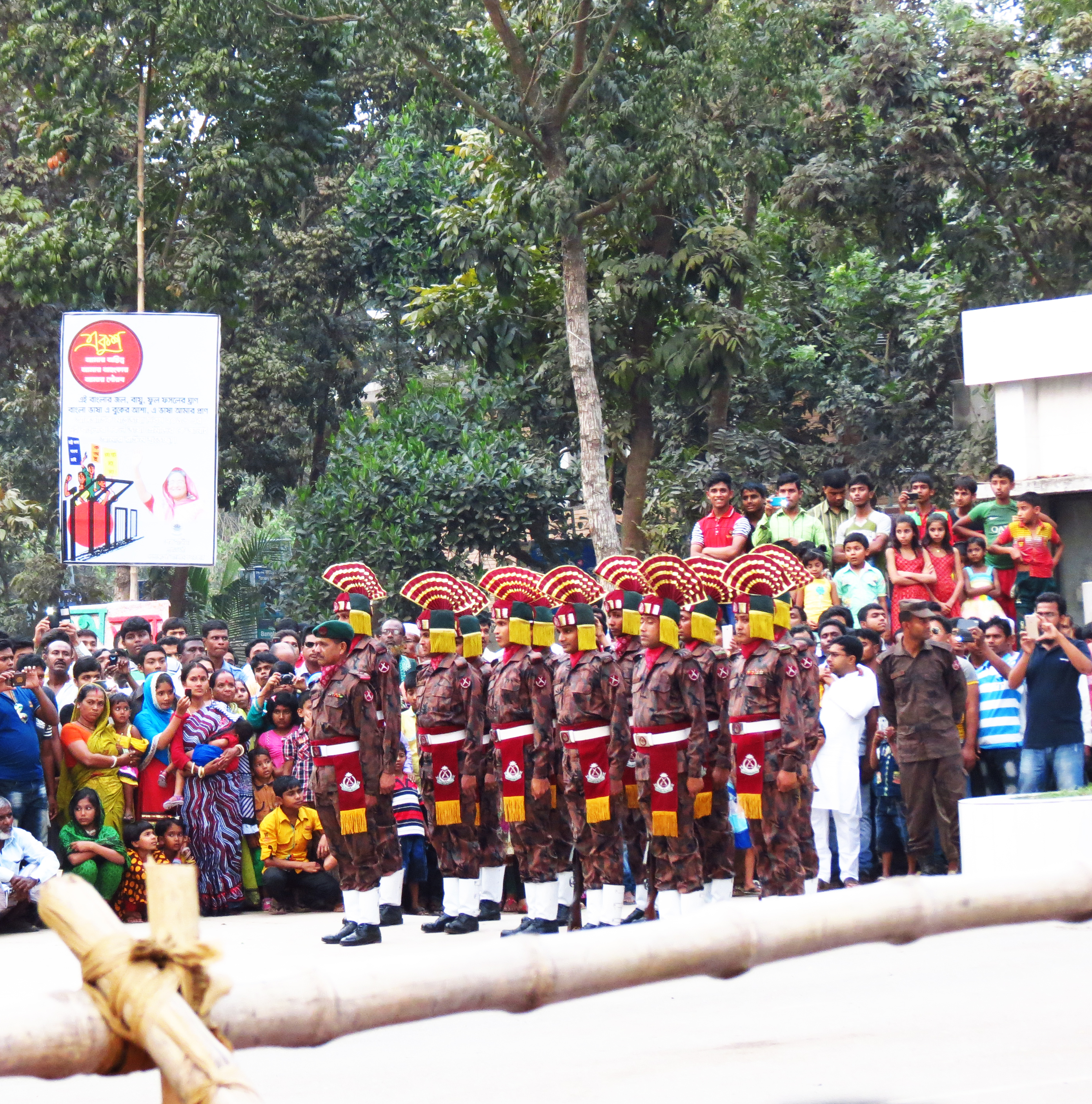

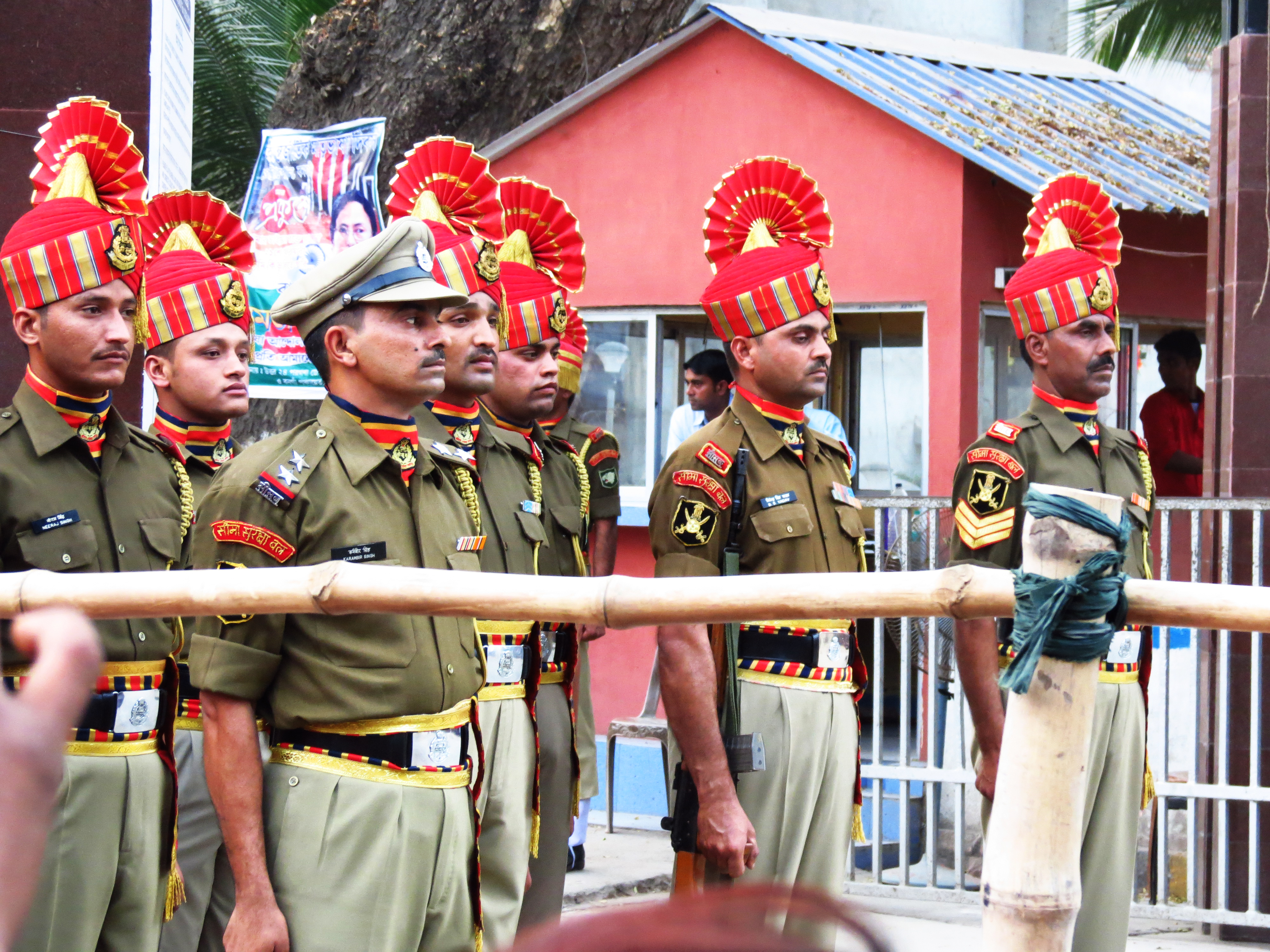

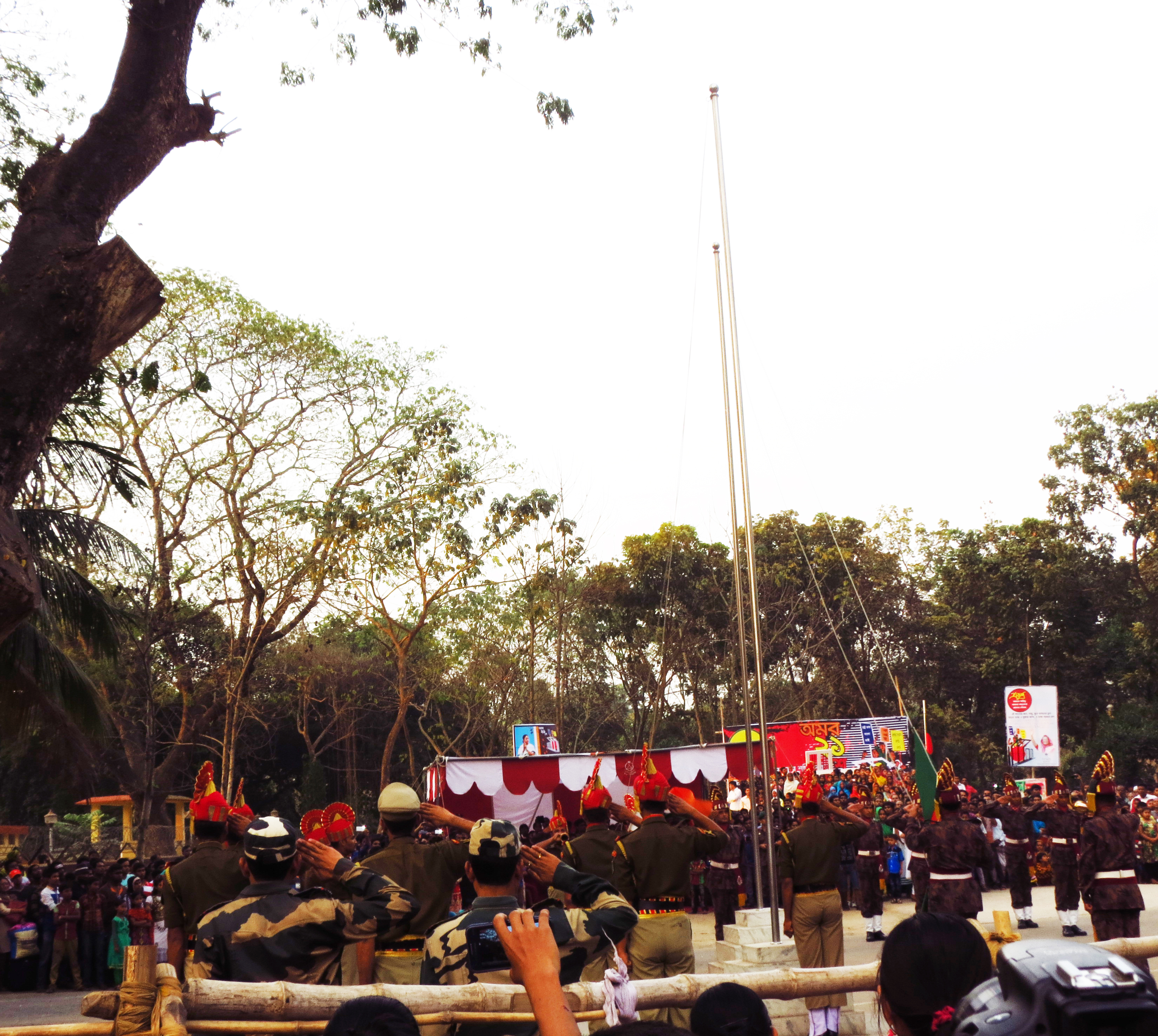

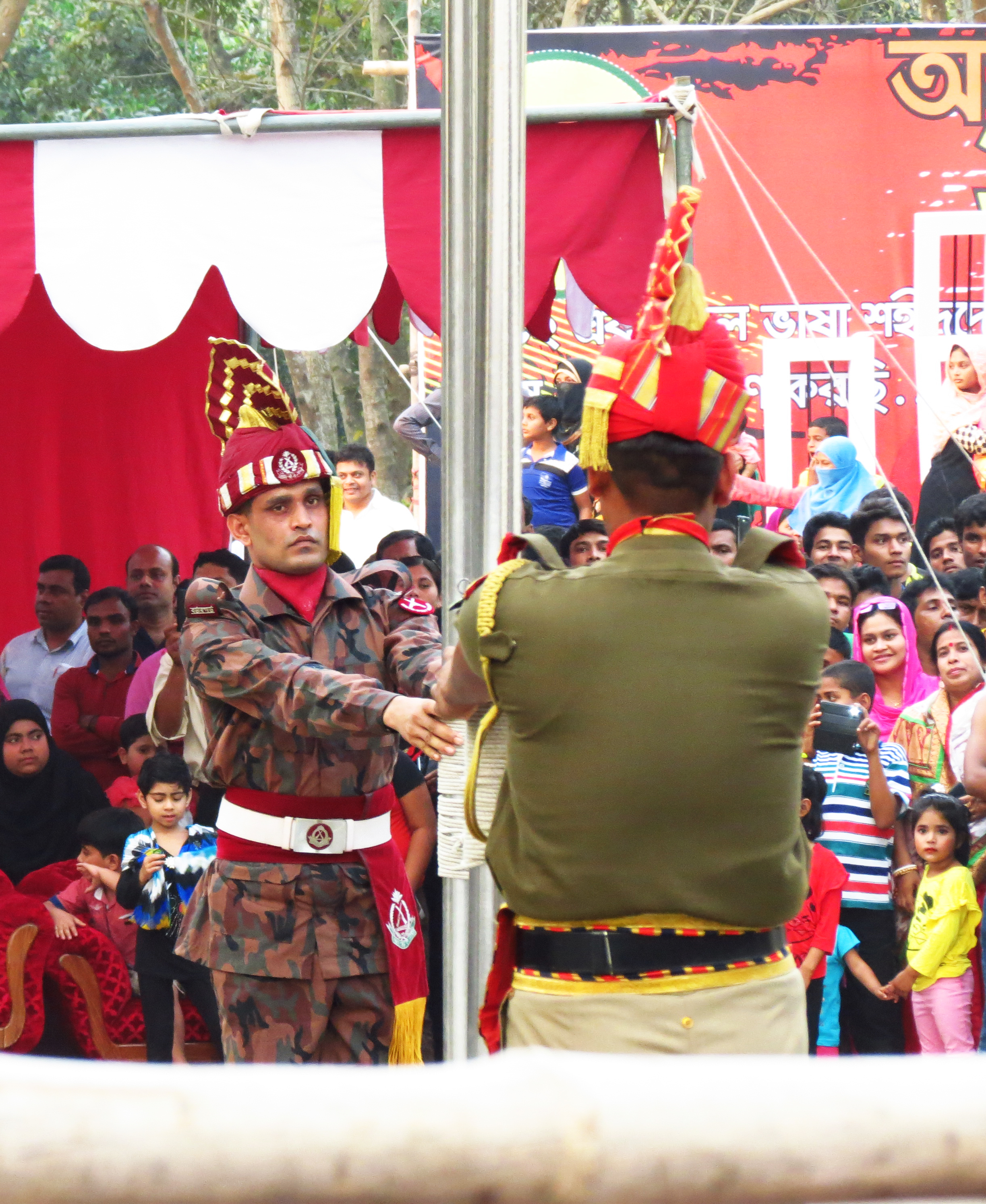

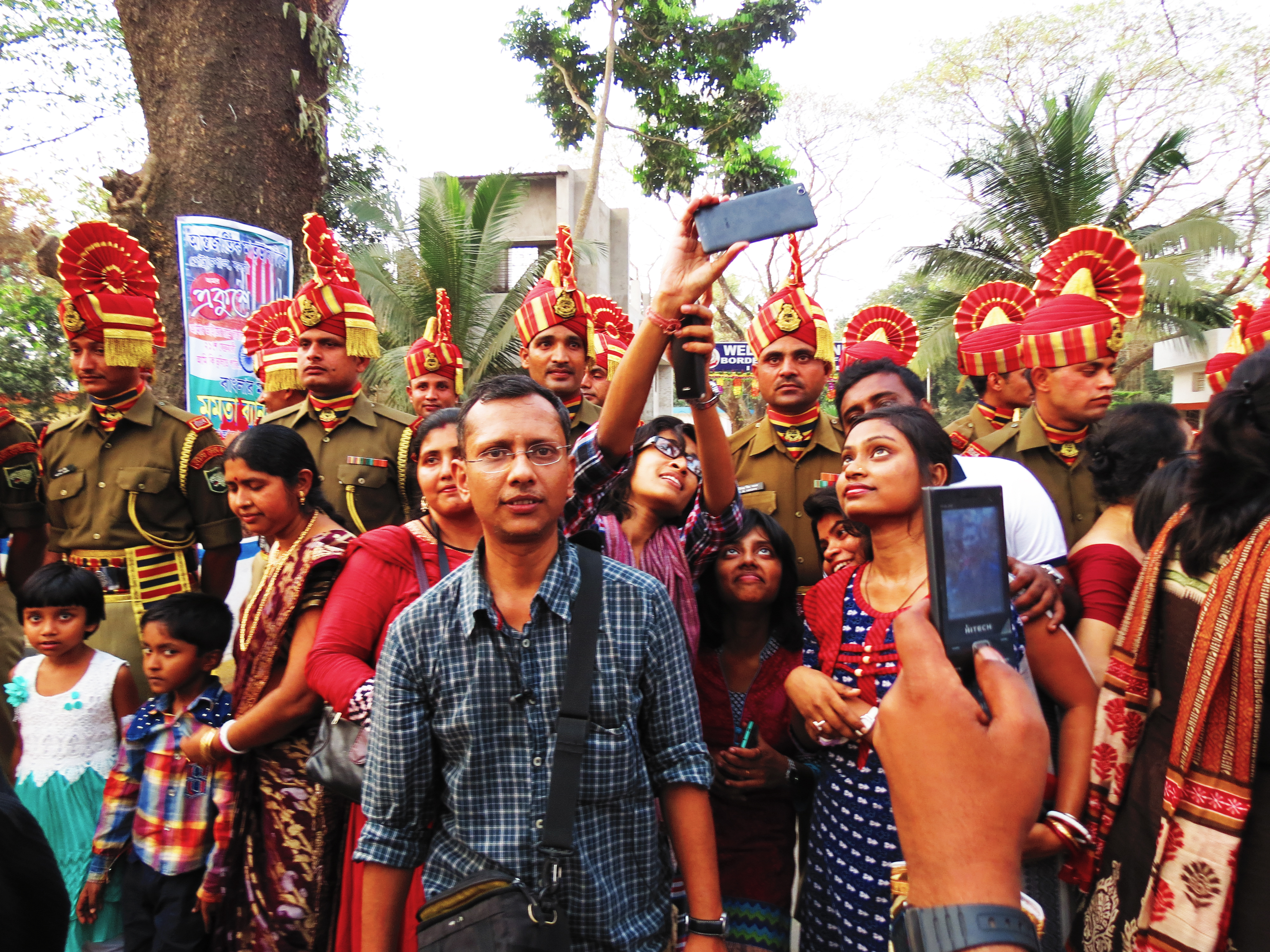

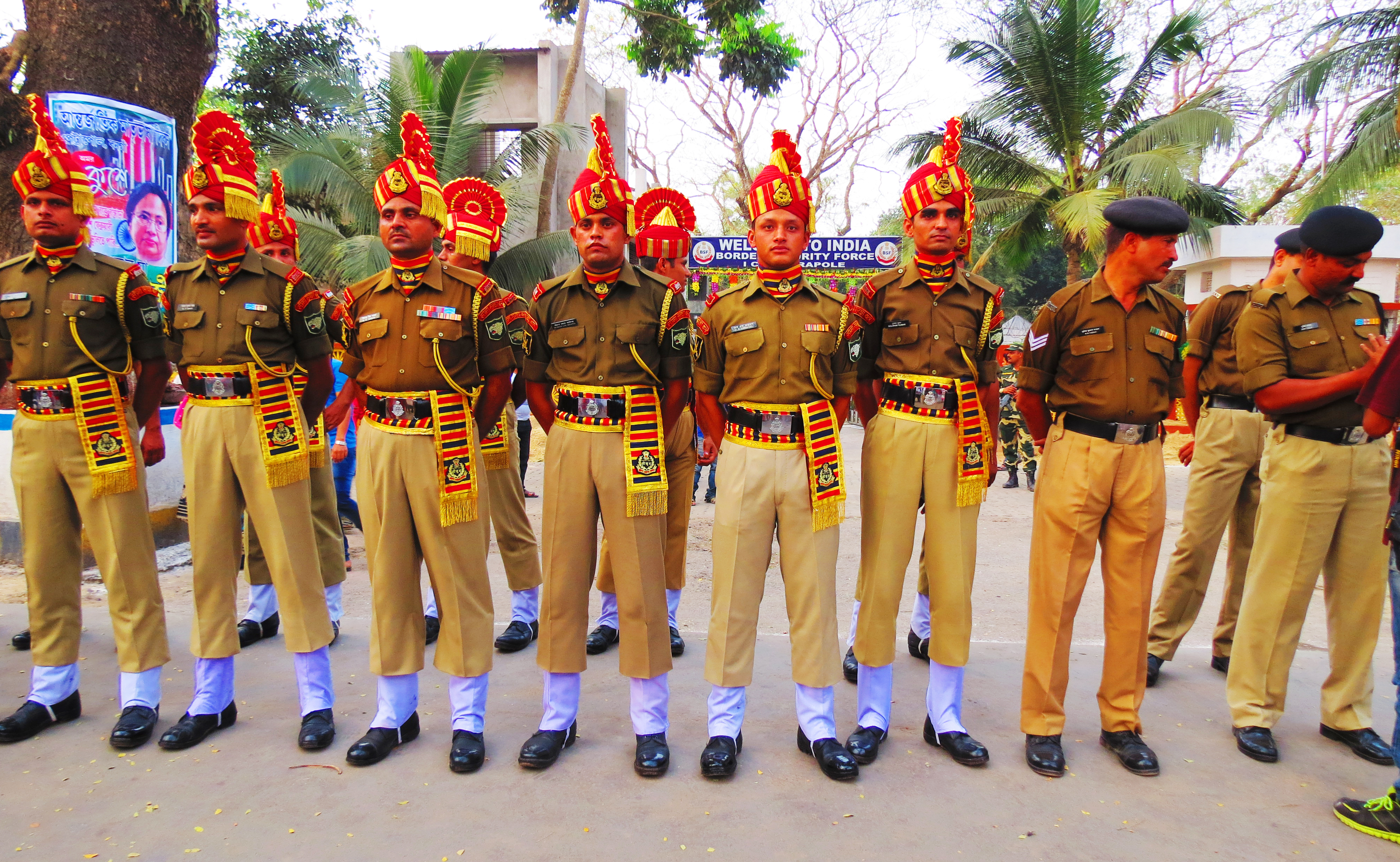

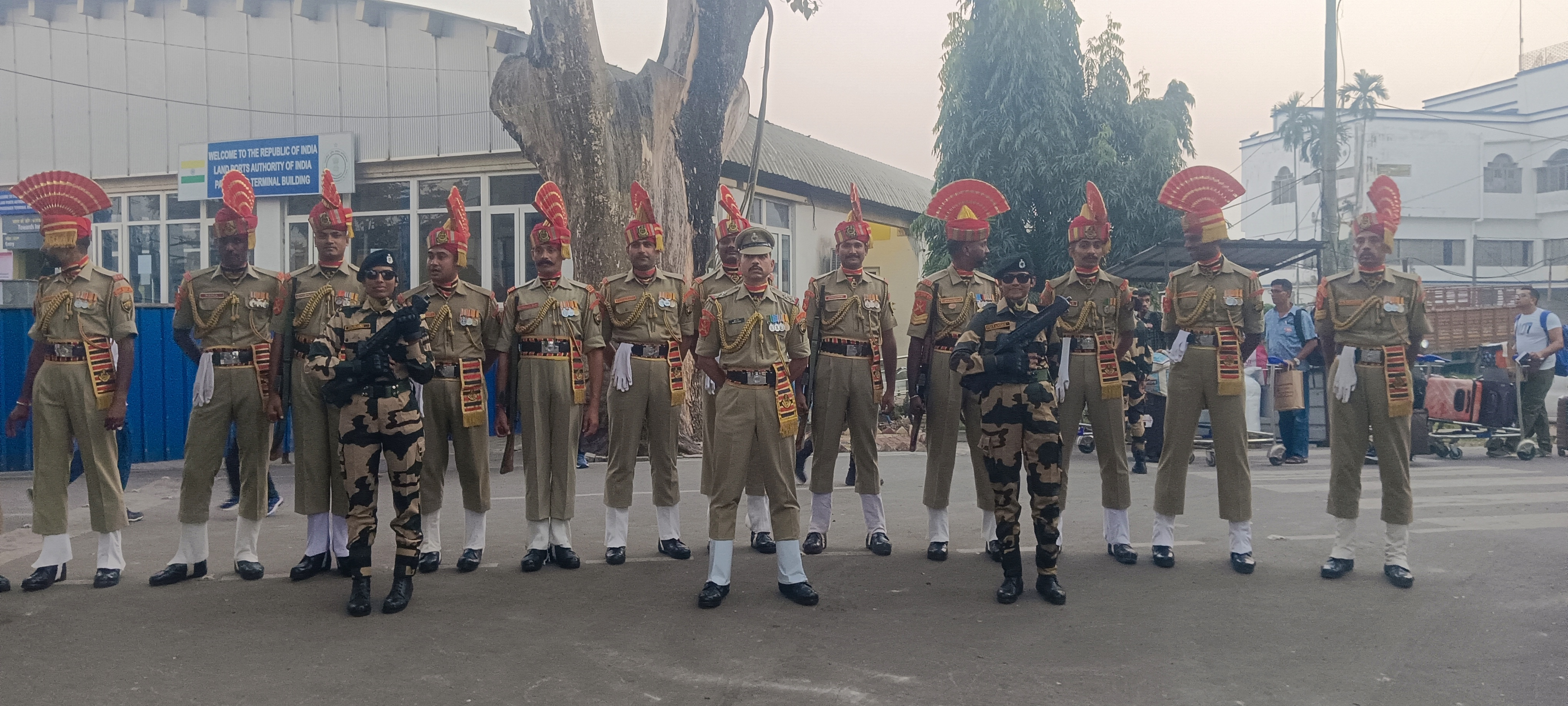

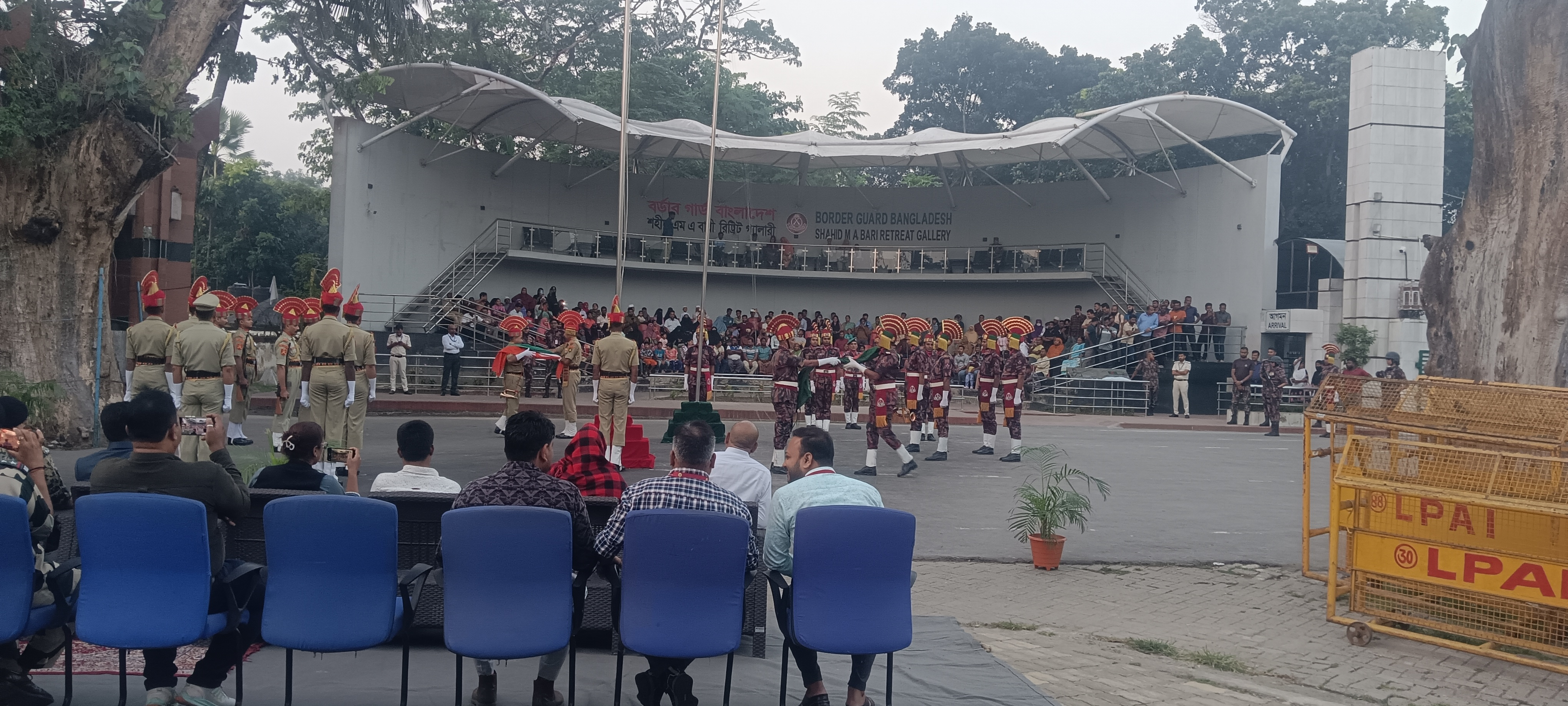

== See also ==
- Benapole Border Crossing
- India-Bangladesh Border Ceremonies
- Borders of India
- Attari–Wagah border ceremony
- Look-East Connectivity projects
- Look East policy (India)
