= Bhanga–Benapole Expressway =

Proposed expressway in Bangladesh

- Bhanga–Benapole Expressway ভাঙ্গা–বেনাপোল এক্সপ্রেসওয়ে

Route information
- Part of AH1
- Length: 129 km (80 mi)

Major junctions
- From: Bhanga Interchange in Bhanga, Faridpur; N805
- To: Benapole Border Crossing in Benapole, Jessore; N706, NH 112

Location
- Country: Bangladesh

Highway system
- Roads in Bangladesh

The Bhanga–Benapole Expressway (Bengali: ভাঙ্গা বেনাপোল এক্সপ্রেসওয়ে) is a proposed national expressway in Bangladesh. It will be operated by the Road Transport and Highways Division. The expressway will be connected to Asian Highway 1.

== History ==
Benapole land port is used for importing goods from India to Bangladesh. It is proposed to construct this expressway with 6 lanes connects the land port with Bhanga Upazila to increase the capacity of international commercial activities. A feasibility study and detailed design were prepared with funding from the Asian Development Bank for the construction project. Its construction cost is estimated at ৳11,072.37 crore. As part of the construction project, 5 flyovers and 4 bypass roads will be constructed. Land acquisition is planned for the project by 2025 at a cost of ৳4,236.60 crore.
