= Bangladesh Inland Water Transport Corporation =

Government-owned port operating company

- Formation: 1972
- Headquarters: Dhaka, Bangladesh
- Region served: Bangladesh
- Official language: Bengali
- Website: www.biwtc.gov.bd

The Bangladesh Inland Water Transport Corporation (abbr. BIWTC, Bengali: বাংলাদেশ অভ্যন্তরীণ নৌ-পরিবহন কর্পোরেশন), is a government-owned company that owns and operates inland vessels and ports in Bangladesh, headquartered in Dhaka.

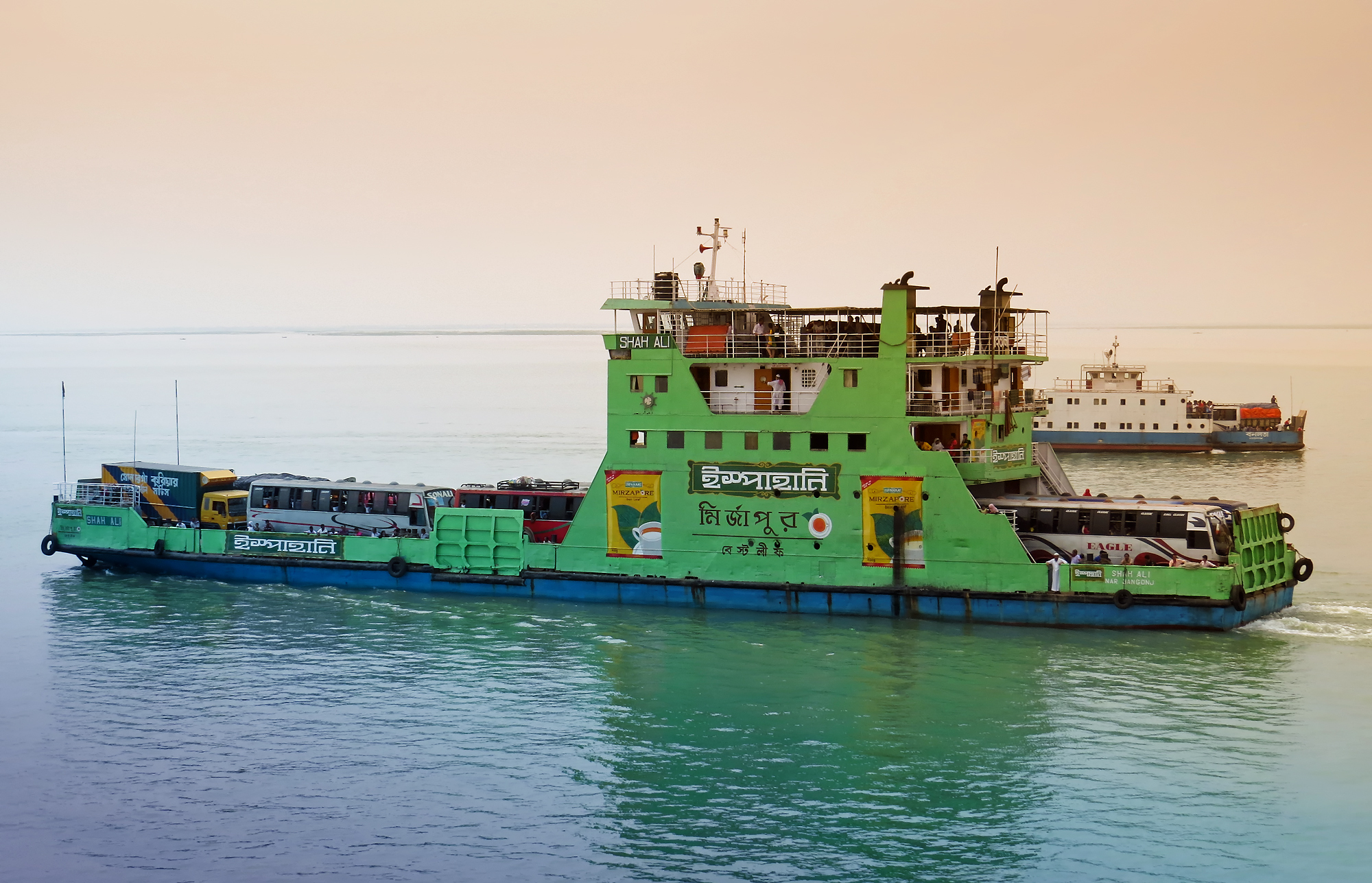
Ro-ro ferry Shah Ali on the river Padma

The organisation gains the majority of its revenue by operating ferry services. It also offers coastal passenger services, container and cargo services, ship repair and breaking services.

== History ==
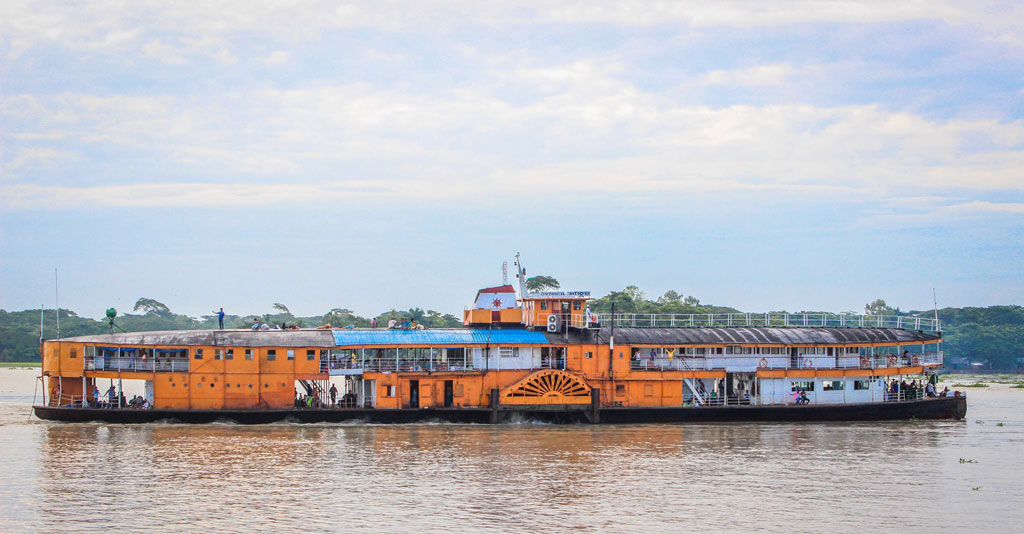
PS Mahsud in Morrelganj, Khulna, Bangladesh

The Bangladesh Inland Water Transport Corporation was founded in 1972 after the Liberation of Bangladesh. It was placed in charge through the nationalisation of the East Pakistan Shipping Corporation and other private shipping corporations.

=== Paddle steamers ===
The company operated around 13 passenger-and-cargo paddle steamers in 1972, nicknamed “the Rockets” for their speed. These included PS Sandra, PS Lali, PS Mohammed, PS Gazi, PS Kiwi, PS Ostrich, PS Mahsud, PS Lepcha, and PS Tern. The steamers served destinations such as Chandpur, Barisal, Khulna, Morrelganj, and Kolkata, from Dhaka.

In the 1980s, the steam engines were replaced with diesel ones, and the wooden paddles were replaced with iron ones. Hydraulic steering was introduced in the 1990s, followed by electro-hydraulic systems in 2020. Modern equipment such as radar and GPS was also installed. However, PS Gazi, PS Teal, and PS Kiwi were decommissioned in the late '90s after catching fire while docked for repairs.

Until 2022, four paddle steamers—PS Ostrich (built in Scotland in 1929), PS Mahsud (1928), PS Lepcha (1938), and PS Tern (1950)—were operated by the BIWTC once a week. This was a reduction from daily trips, and commercial services were eventually stopped altogether due to safety concerns, operational losses, and a lack of passengers, especially following the inauguration of the Padma Bridge.

== Fleet and service ==
As of 2024, the BIWTC has a total of 119 vessels, including 59 ferries, 20 passenger vessels, 16 coastal vessels, nine tugboats, and 15 cargo and container ships.

=== Passenger vessels ===
Although passenger services are not in operation as of 2024, the corporation has five historic paddle steamers in its passenger ferry fleet: the PS Ostrich (1929), PS Mahsud (1928), PS Lepcha (1938), PS Tern (1950), and the MV Shela (1951). The company commissioned the modern MV Madhumoti (2015) and the MV Bangali (2014) passenger ferries for the first time in six decades, each 76 metres (249 ft) long and capable of carrying 750 passengers, from Western Marine Shipyard.

=== Roll-on/roll-off ferries ===
BIWTC runs roll-on/roll-off ferry services for vehicles on seven routes, bridging destinations inaccessible directly by road:

From	To	Distance
Paturia	Daulatdia	3 km (1.9 mi)
Aricha	Kazirhat	14 km (8.7 mi)
Raomari	Chilmari	28.5 km (17.7 mi)
Dawapara	Nazirganj	6 km (3.7 mi)
Chandpur	Shariatpur	10 km (6.2 mi)
Bhola	Lakshmipur	28 km (17 mi)
Laharhat	Vadutia	10 km (6.2 mi)
Khulna	Terokhoda	1.5 km (0.93 mi)
