= Shreerampur =

Shreerampur শ্রীরামপুর গ্রাম
- Village
- Bhomra Union
- Location within Bangladesh
- Coordinates: 22.646686°N 88.983724°E
- Country: Bangladesh
- Division: Khulna
- District: Satkhira
- Upazila: Satkhira Sadar

Government
  - Type: Member
  - Body: Union Parishad
  - Member: Nesserullah Al Mamun (Freedom)
- Time zone: UTC+6 (BST)
- Website: bhomraup.satkhira.gov.bd

Shreerampur is a Village under Bhomra Union of Satkhira Sadar Upazila of Satkhira District in the division of Khulna, Bangladesh.

The Shreerampur is a traditional and largest village in Bhomra Union in Satkhira Sadar upazila of Satkhira district of Satkhira district, the white golden district of South Bengal of Bangladesh.

== Location and boundaries ==
Shreerampur is bounded on the north by Alipur Union, on the south by Kulia Union, on the east by Kulia Union and Alipur Union, and on the west by Bhomra Union, which is close to the border of the Indian state of West Bengal

== Education and culture ==
Education and culture
