= Port of Noapara =

River port in Bangladesh

Port of Noapara নওয়াপাড়া নদীবন্দর
- Interactive map of Port of Noapara নওয়াপাড়া নদীবন্দর
- Location within Bangladesh

Location
- Country: Bangladesh
- Location: Abhaynagar Upazila
- Coordinates: 23.034334°N 89.396754°E

Details
- Opened: 19th Century
- Owned by: Bangladesh Inland Water Transport Authority
- Type of Harbor: River port
- Land area: 51.55 acres

Port of Noapara is a river port located on the west bank of Bhairab River. It is one of the major river port in Bangladesh. It is mainly use to transport goods from Port of Mongla and Port of Khulna. And reducing traffic at Port of Khulna.

== History ==
The port of Noapara was developed as a full river port in 2004 but it origin back in 19th century. In 2022 the Government of Bangladesh budget 454 core taka to improve it's infrastructure.
