= Benapole Border Crossing =

International border crossing between Bangladesh and India

Benapole Crossing বেনাপোল ক্রসিং बेनापोल क्रॉसिंग
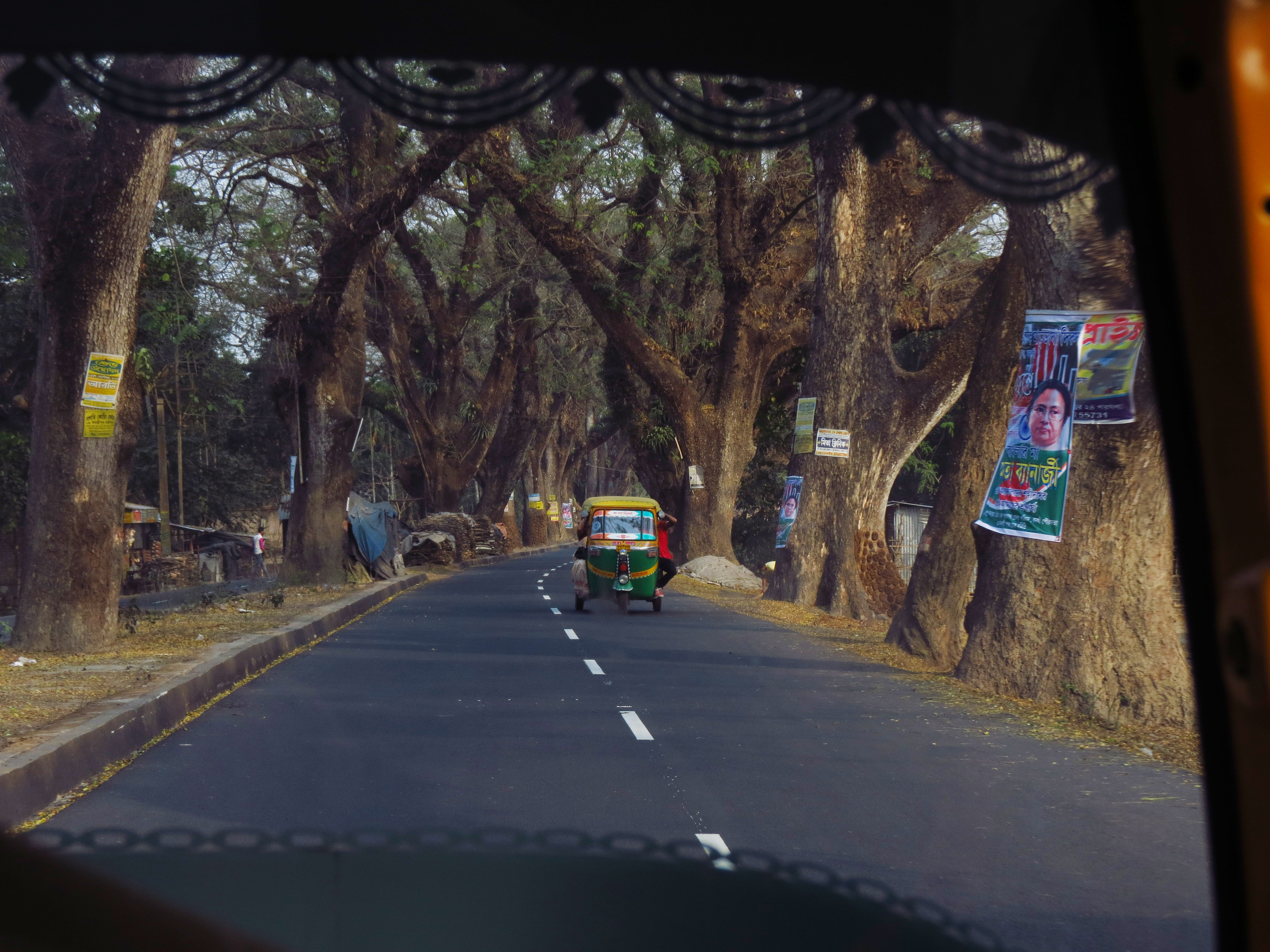
- En route to Benapole Border Crossing (From India)
- Coordinates: 23.0426194°N 88.893623°E
- Carries: Pedestrians, Vehicles, Containers, Rails
- Crosses: Border between Bangladesh and India
- Locale: Benapole, Bangladesh; Petrapole, West Bengal, India
- Official name: Benapole Border Crossing বেনাপোল সীমান্ত ক্রসিং बेनापोल बॉर्डर क्रॉसिंग
- Maintained by: (Bangladesh) BLPA (India) LPAI

History
- Opened: 1947

Location
- Interactive map of Benapole Crossing

The Benapole Border Crossing also known as the Petrapole Crossing (Bengali: বেনাপোল বর্ডার ক্রসিং বা পেট্রাপোল ক্রসিং, Hindi: बेनापोल सीमा पार या पेट्रापोल क्रॉसिंग) is an international border crossing between Benapole, Jessore, Bangladesh, and Petrapole, North 24 Parganas, West Bengal, India.

== History ==
At the time of Partition of Bengal (1947) the Radcliffe Line placed the police station areas of Bangaon and Gaighata of Jessore district in India and the area was made a part of 24 Parganas district. After that the land of petrapole went into India. It is a flat plain located in the lower Ganges Delta. After partition of India in 1947, a custom house established between eastern province of Pakistan named East Bengal and West Bengal of India at Benapole-Petrapole border site. In that time the immigration section was controlled by custom house of Pakistan and India. After independence of Bangladesh in 1971, Bangladesh government started to export jute in India through this border crossing. In 1984-85 the responsibility to manage and control Benapole crossing was given to Mongla Port Authority and transformed into custom division. On 2 February 2002, Bangladesh Land Port Authority was established and they were given to the task of managing this border crossing (except immigration process).

== Customs and trade ==
On the Bangladesh-India land border, Benapole land port is the most important land port of Bangladesh and is operated by the Bangladesh Land Port Authority (BLPA). About 90% of the imported Indian goods enter Bangladesh through this port. Geographically Benapole is a major strategical point for border trading between India and Bangladesh owing to its proximity to Kolkata. According to Land Port Authority, approximately 90 percent of the total imported items from India come through Benapole. Primarily Benapole land port was an Land Customs station and gradually it turned into a Customs Division (1984) and later Custom House (1997) in response to its rising importance as in terms of import volume.

As of 2009, 143 staff including 9 officials and 134 employees are working at the Benapole land port. In fiscal year 1996-97 revenue realized from Benapole land port was around Taka 5 billion, at present it is Taka 8.50 billion.

Benapole land port is also lucrative for Indian exporters for its cheaper service and equipment charges. Indian goods receive duty exemption advantage in this land port. The Indian Government has also decided to give priority to export in Bangladesh through Benapole-Petrapole border. Kolkata, one of the commercial hubs of India, is only 80 kilometers away from the Petrapole-Benapole border and is involved in development in the area. Benapole had witnessed a rise of imports by 15 – 20 percent each year. It has become a significant revenue generator for the government since late 1980s. However, port facilities remain under-developed as yet. Carriability of the road from Benapole to Jessopre is limited notwithstanding regular maintenance. A two-member consultant team of the Asian Development Bank is working to sort out improvement areas in the immigration and customs of the land port and also studying feasibility of Benapole-Petropole border as a corridor of transit in this South Asian region. This check post accounts of India trade with Bangladesh that worth more than $4 billion. This is the largest land port of Asia. The landport alone accounts for nearly 60 per cent of trade that Bangladesh do with Indian and vice versa. About 90% of the imported Indian goods enter Bangladesh through this port.

== Immigration point ==
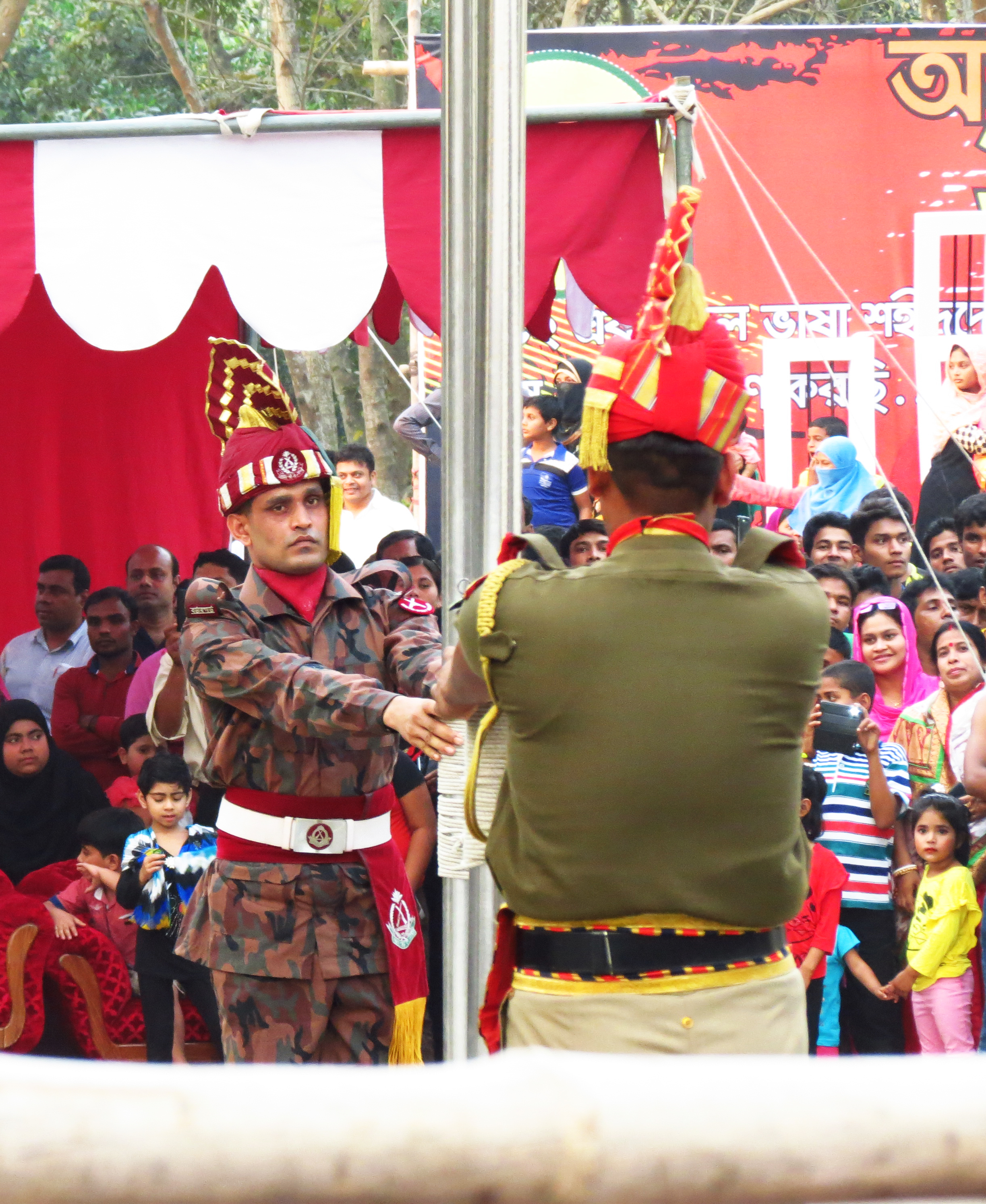
Benapole–Petrapole border ceremony

In 2009 new buildings were constructed in the location and Benapole Customs and Immigration Check post started its operation since then.

== Rail network ==
The Petrapole-Benapole rail link was opened in 2001 after being closed for 24 years. There is a proposal to construct a by-pass road to ease congestion on the present road, connecting Benapole to NH 112 (earlier NH 35), bypassing Bangaon. On 9 November 2017, Nearly 10 years after Kolkata-Dhaka passenger train was flagged off after a gap of 43 years, a new train – Bandhan Express – was inaugurated between Kolkata and Khulna in Bangladesh (via Petrapole and Benapole), covering a distance of about 172 km. This is a weekly train and runs on Thursdays from both sides.

== See also ==
- Petrapole-Benapole Border Ceremony
