= Bangladesh Land Port Authority =

Government agency

- Formation: 2001
- Headquarters: Dhaka, Bangladesh
- Region served: Bangladesh
- Official language: Bengali
- Chairman: K. M. Tariqul Islam
- Website: Bangladesh Land Port Authority

The Bangladesh Land Port Authority or BSBK is an autonomous body that manages all border ports of Bangladesh.

== History ==
The Bangladesh Land Ports Authority falls under the Ministry of Shipping. It was created in 2001 and manages 13 land ports including Benapole Land Port. Tapan Kumar Chakravarty is the present chairman of the authority.

== List of land ports ==
- Benapole Land Port
- Burimari Land Port
- Akhaura Land Port
- Bhomra Land Port
- Nakugaon Land Port
- Tamabil Land Port
- Sonahat Land Port
- Hili Land Port
- Teknaf Land Port
- Bibir Bazar Land Port
- Banglabandha Land Port
- Tura Land Port
