= Darshana land port =

Darshana Land Port
- Click on the map for a fullscreen view

Location
- Country: Bangladesh
- Location: Darshana, Damurhuda, Chuadanga
- Coordinates: 23.526468°N 88.797127°E

Details
- Type of harbour: dry port

Darshana Land Port, is a land port of Bangladesh located in Darshana of Damurhuda Upazila in the Chuadanga District. This port is used to export-import good with India through Darshana-Gede border. This port is governed by Bangladesh Land Port Authority. Darshana land port is the first entrance point for trains to Calcutta, India.
