= Bhomra Union =

Bhomra Union ভোমরা ইউনিয়ন
- Union
- Bhomra Union
- Location within Bangladesh
- Coordinates: 22.43°N 89.05°E
- Country: Bangladesh
- Division: Khulna
- District: Satkhira
- Upazila: Satkhira Sadar

Government
  - Type: Chairman-Member
  - Body: Union Parishad
  - Chairman: Israel Ghazi (Freedom)
- Time zone: UTC+6 (BST)
- Website: bhomraup.satkhira.gov.bd

Bhomra (Bengali: ভোমরা) is a union parishad under Satkhira Sadar Upazila of Satkhira District in the division of Khulna, Bangladesh.

The 6th Bhomra Union is a traditional and largest public post in Satkhira Sadar upazila of Satkhira district of Satkhira district, the white golden district of South Bengal of Bangladesh.

== Geography ==
Bhomra Union is located in the Satkhira District of South-West region of Bangladesh. To the north is the Alipore Union, to the east and to the south is the Kuliyaya Union, to the west is India. In the course of time, even today, the Union is still alive in its own uniqueness in various fields including education, culture, religious ceremonies, sports.

== Area ==
The area of The Bhomra Union is 7,246 acres.

== Administration ==
The number of villages is :10. 1) Shreerampur (2) Gayeshpur (3)Chaubarwiya (4) Baichana (5)Padmashakhra, (6)Shakhra (7)Hadaddha (8)Bhomra (9)Lakhidari (10) Navatkati.

Number of markets: 3. (1)Shreerampur Bazar, (2)Bhomra Bazar (3)Shankhra Hat

Landport :1 Bhomra Landport

== Population ==
According to 2014 statistics, the population of The Bhomra Union is 28,648. Of these, 14,631 are men and 14,017 are women. The number of families is 4986.

== Education ==
The literacy rate of Bhomra Union is 45.68%. The union has 1 college United Model College, 3 secondary schools Bhomra Union Polly Shree Secondary School, Shakhra Komarpur AG Secondary School Rashida Begum Secondary School, 2 Madrasas Bhomra Union Fildha Madrasa, Khadijatul Kubra Dhari Madrasa and 5 primary schools. [1]

== Former chairmen ==
1.Late Musharraf Ali Khan

2.Late Abdul Rauf

3. Md. Shahidul Islam

4.Late Ranjit Ghosh

5.Late Md. Moslem Ali (acting)

6. Md. Robiul Islam

7. Md. Samshul Alam

8. Md. Asadur Rahman

9. Md. Israel Ghazi
