= Benapole =

- Port City
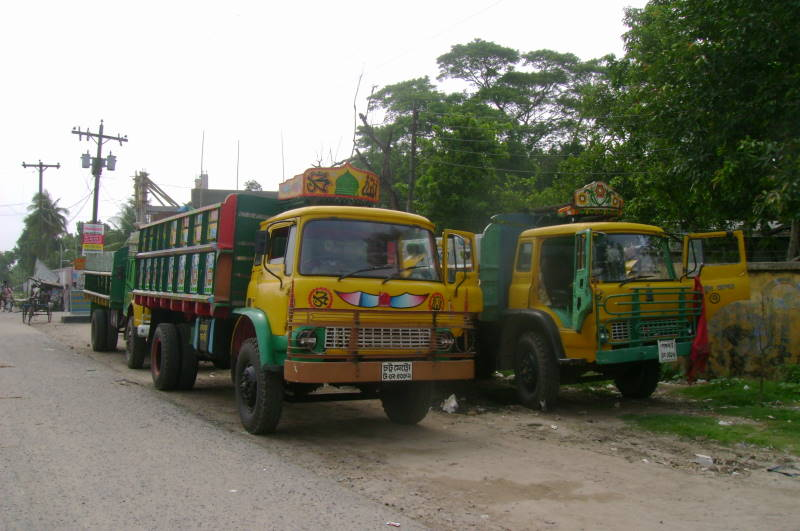
- Trucks at Benapole Land Port

- Location within Khulna division Location within Bangladesh
- Coordinates: 23°2′31″N 88°53′44″E
- Country: Bangladesh
- Region: Khulna
- District: Jessore
- Upazila: Sharsha

Area
  - Total: 14.22 km^{2} (5.49 sq mi)

Population (2011)
  - Total: 36,524
  - Density: 2,568/km^{2} (6,652/sq mi)
- Time zone: UTC+6 (BST)

Benapole Municipality mahallah geocode map

Benapole (Bengali: বেনাপোল) is a town at Sharsha Upazila in the Jessore District of Bangladesh. The Petrapole Customs station of India is situated across the border, and since 1947, many people have travelled between what is now Bangladesh and India through the Benapole Customs / Land port station. This is one of the important rail transit points of the railway link between Bangladesh and India.

Urbanization of Benapole started in the 1990s along the Grand Trunk Road. In April 1971, the operational area of Sector 8 comprised the districts of Kushtia, Jessore, Khulna, Barisal, Faridpur, and Patuakhali. At the end of May, the sector was reconstituted and comprised the districts of Kushtia, Jessore, Khulna, Satkhira, and the northern part of Faridpur district. Benapole served as the headquarters of sector 8 in the liberation war.

It is the site of the largest land port in Bangladesh.

== Customs ==
On the Bangladesh-India land border, Benapole land port is the most important land port of Bangladesh and is operated by the Bangladesh Land Port Authority (BLPA). About 90% of the imported Indian goods enter Bangladesh through this port. Geographically, Benapole is a major strategic point for border trading between India and Bangladesh owing to its proximity to Kolkata. Primarily, Benapole land port was a land customs station and gradually it turned into a customs division (1984) and later a customs house (1997) in response to its rising importance in terms of import volume.

As of 2009, 143 staff, including 9 officials and 134 employees, are working at the Benapole land port. In fiscal year 1996–97, revenue realized from Benapole land port was around Taka 5 billion, at present, it is Taka 8.50 billion.

Benapole land port is also lucrative for Indian exporters for its cheaper service and equipment charges. Indian goods receive a duty exemption advantage in this land port. The Indian government has also decided to give priority to exports to Bangladesh through the Benapole-Petrapole border. Kolkata, one of the commercial hubs of India, is only 80 kilometers away from the Petrapole-Benapole border and is involved in development in the area.

Benapole had witnessed a rise in imports by 15 – 20 percent each year. It has become a significant revenue generator for the government since the late 1980s. However, port facilities remain underdeveloped as yet. The carrying capacity of the road from Benapole to Jessore is limited, notwithstanding regular maintenance. A two-member consultant team of the Asian Development Bank (ADB) is working to sort out improvement areas in the immigration and customs of the land port and also studying the feasibility of the Benapole-Petropole border as a corridor of transit in this South Asian region.

== Demographics ==
Religions in Benapole (2011)
| Religion | Percent |
| Islam | 97.26% |
| Hinduism | 2.71% |
| Other or not stated | 0.03% |

As of the 2011 Bangladesh census, Benapole had 8,563 households and a population of 36,524. 7,384 (20.22%) were under 10 years of age. Benapole had an average literacy rate of 56.9%, compared to the national average of 51.8%, and a sex ratio of 977 females per 1000 males.

== Transport ==
Benapole has an excellent transport system at the border point between India and Bangladesh.

By road, the historical Jessore Road passes through the town from Jessore to Kolkata. The road is also part of the Bangladeshi national highways N706, and N711, and Asian Highway 1. It will also be the endpoint of the under-construction Bhanga-Benapole Expressway.

By railway, Benapole railway station is just 2 km away from the international passenger terminal at the zero point of the border. Two trains from Dhaka to Benapole connect through this station, Benapole Express and Ruposhi Bangla Express. And Betna Commuter and Mongla Commuter connect Khulna and Mongla Port. And all the trains from Benapole connect to Jessore.

The nearest airport is the Jashore Airport, which is 42 km away from Benapole.

== See also ==
- Benapole Border Crossing
