= Port of Khulna =

Port of Khulna খুলনা নদীবন্দর
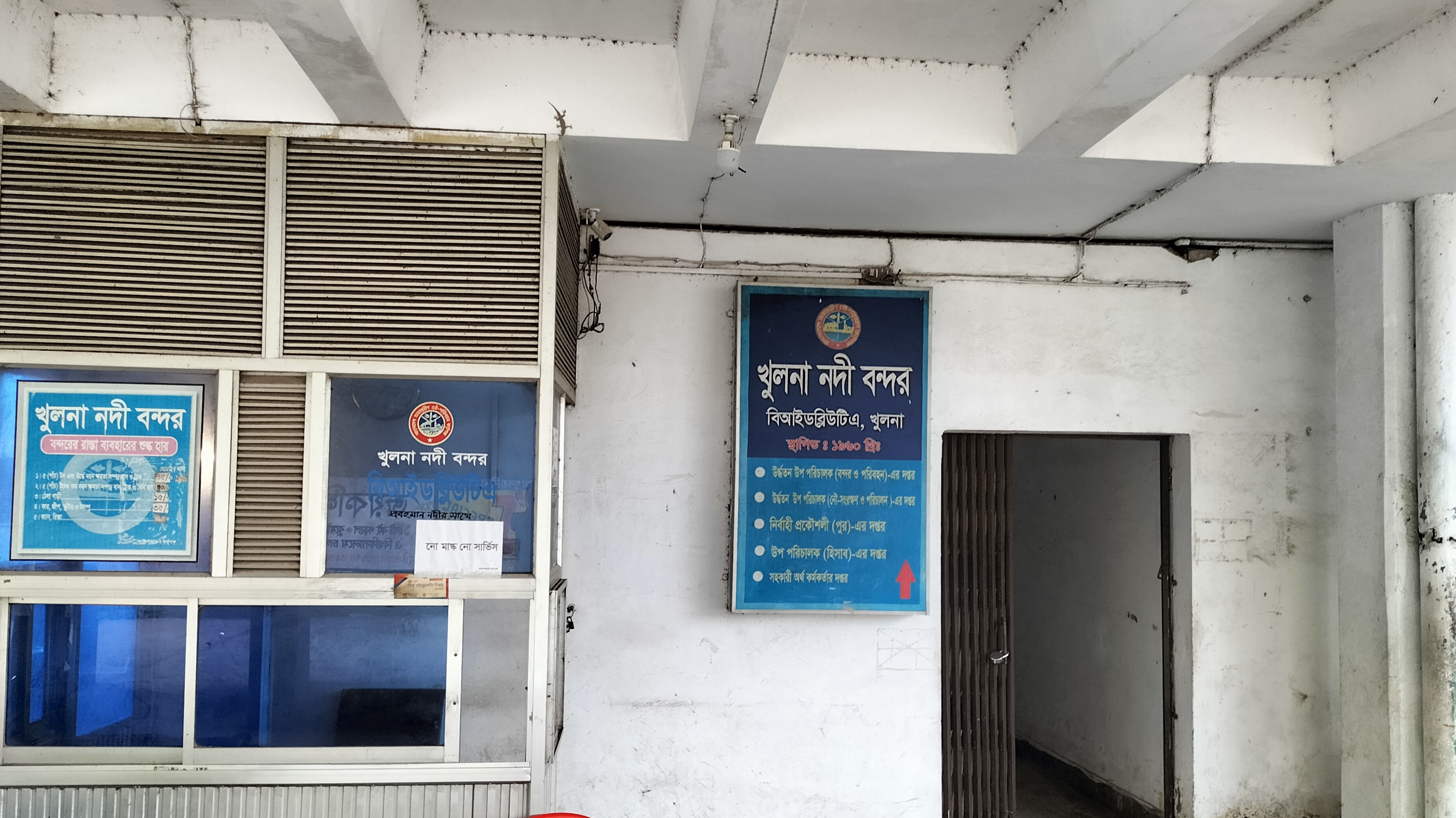
- Signboard of Port of Khulna
- Click on the map for a fullscreen view

Location
- Country: Bangladesh
- Location: Khulna
- Coordinates: 22.82552°N 89.55720°E
- UN/LOCODE: BDKHL

Details
- Opened: 17th century
- Owned by: Bangladesh Inland Water Transport Authority
- Type of harbour: River port
- Land area: 143 acres

Port of Khulna is a river port located on the west bank of Bhairab River. It is one of the major river port in Bangladesh. It mainly used for the transportation goods from Port of Mongla through river in Khulna.

== History ==
The port of Khulna was developed as a full river port in 1960s but it origin back in 17th century. The port cover 143 acres of land on Khalishpur beside BNS Titumir. The Port of Noapara is upstream port of this port.
