= Aricha Ghat =

River port in Manikganj, Bangladesh

Port of Aricha আরিচা নদীবন্দর
- Interactive map of Port of Aricha আরিচা নদীবন্দর
- Location in Bangladesh

Location
- Country: Bangladesh
- Location: Manikganj
- Coordinates: 23.8360°N 89.7806°E

Details
- Opened: 1983; 43 years ago
- Owned by: Bangladesh Inland Water Transport Authority
- Type of harbour: River port

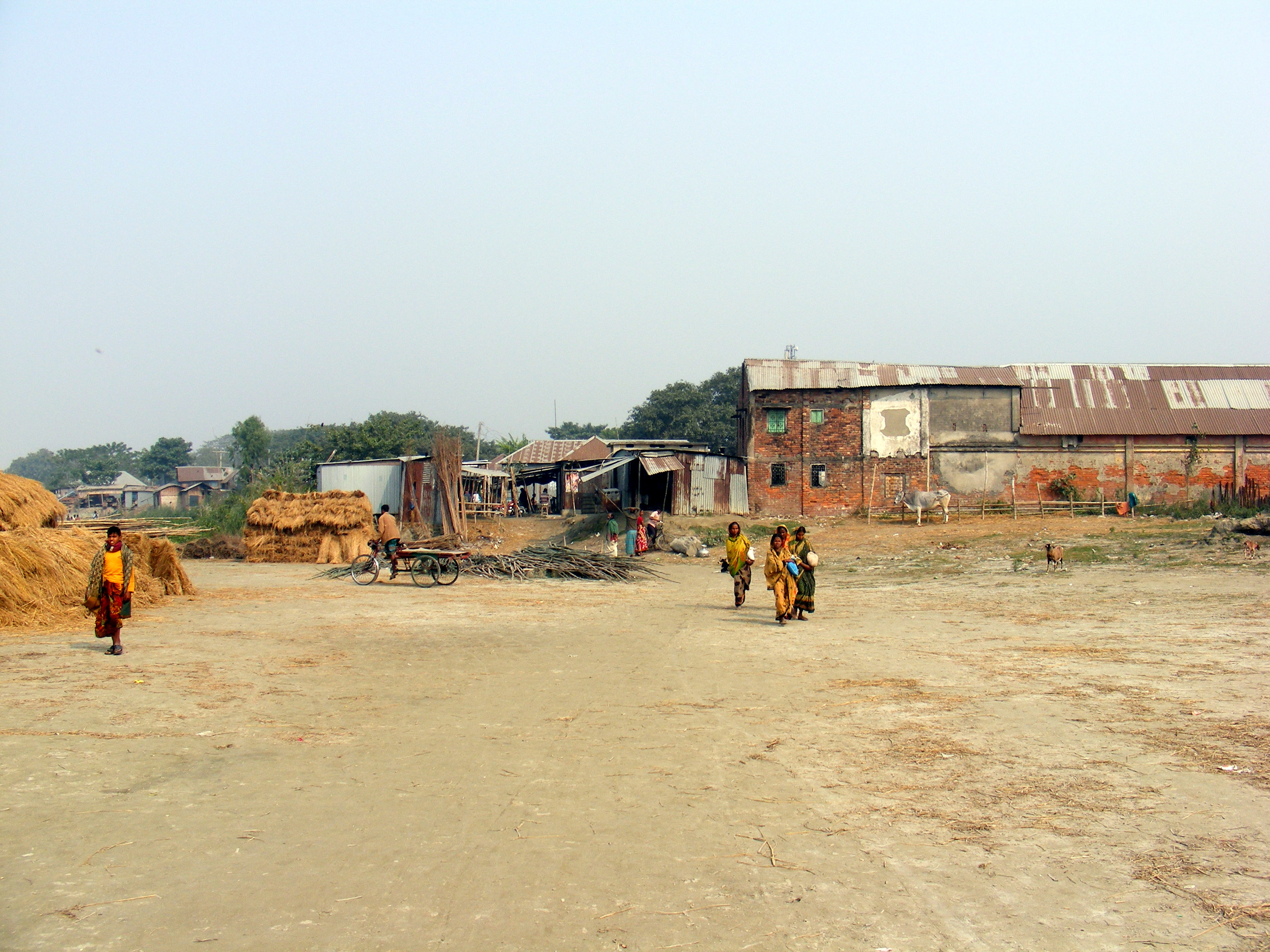
Aricha Ghat in Shivalaya, Manikganj, Bangladesh. Aricha was the home of largest inter-water port of Bangladesh, connecting 3 divisions of the country through one port. Currently only small launch and engine boat services are being operated from here to a few destinations.

Aricha Ghat is a river port in Bangladesh. It is situated in Manikganj District. The port is managed by Bangladesh Inland Water Transport Authority. Daulatdia-Paturia route ferries ply from this port.

== History ==
The port officially launched its ferry operations on 31 March 1963 with a single ferry called Karnafuli. During Bangladesh liberation war, Mukti Bahini sank one launch, three ferries, one coaster and launch and terminal pontoon in the Ghat.

While once one of the busiest ports, its importance has seen a notable decline. This has been influenced by the availability of alternative land routes and waterways such as the more recent Jamuna Bridge.

== Fishing ==
Hilsha is caught from the area. Sudipta Das, former vice chairman of National Fishermen's Cooperative in Dhaka called the place "Prime Spot" for catching Hilsha.
