= Petrapole =

- Border Checkpoint
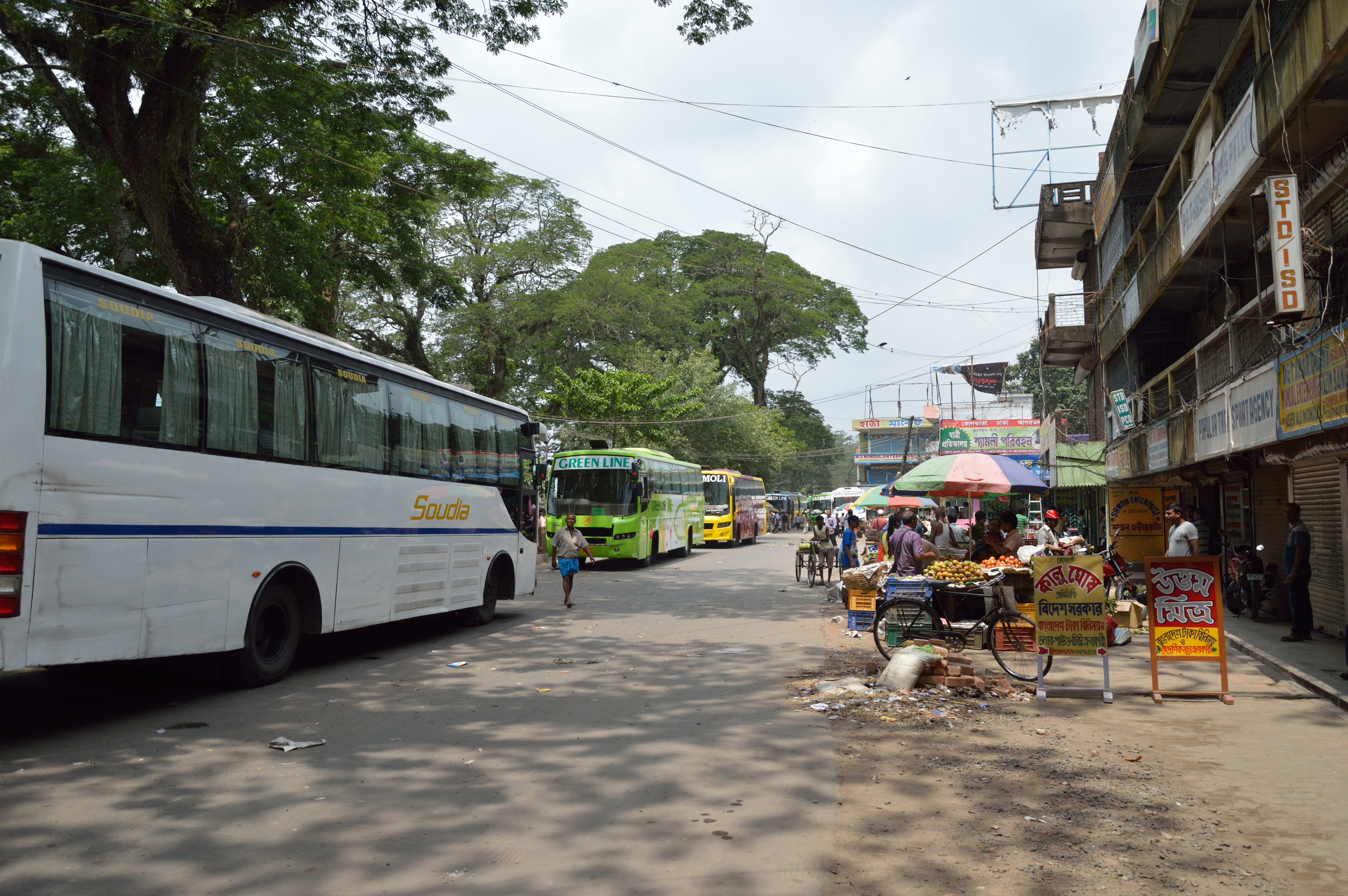
- Jessore Road, Petrapole

- Location in West Bengal, India Petrapole (India)
- Coordinates: 23.0°N 88.83°E
- Country: India
- State: West Bengal
- District: North 24 Parganas
- Elevation: 6 m (20 ft)

Languages
  - Official: Bengali, English
- Time zone: UTC+5:30 (IST)
- Vehicle registration: WB
- Website: north24parganas.nic.in

Petrapole is the Indian side of Petrapole-Benapole border checkpoint between India and Benapole of Bangladesh, on the Bangladesh-India border, near Bongaon in North 24 Parganas district of West Bengal. Petrapole border is the only land port in south Bengal. It is also the largest land customs station in Asia.

== Geography ==
Cities, towns and locations in Bangaon subdivision, North 24 Parganas district
M: municipal town, CT: census town, R: rural/ urban centre, T: place of tourist interest
Owing to space constraints in the small map, the actual locations in a larger map may vary slightly

=== Location ===
Petrapole is in the district of North 24 Parganas and is about 95 km from Kolkata on the National Highway 112 (formerly NH 35). The nearest town and passenger rail station is Bongaon.

=== Area overview ===
The area shown in the map was a part of Jessore district from 1883. At the time of Partition of Bengal (1947) the Radcliffe Line placed the police station areas of Bangaon and Gaighata of Jessore district in India and the area was made a part of 24 Parganas district. The renowned novelist, Bibhutibhushan Bandopadhyay (of Pather Panchali fame) belonged to this area and many of his writings portray his experience in the area. It is a flat plain located in the lower Ganges Delta. In the densely populated area, 16.33% of the population lives in the urban areas and 83.67% lives in the rural areas.

Note: The map alongside presents some of the notable locations in the subdivision. All places marked in the map are linked in the larger full screen map.

== Significance ==
This check post accounts for more than half of the $4-billion (nearly double the trade volume with Pakistan) trade with Bangladesh. This is the largest land port of Asia. The landport alone accounts for nearly 60 per cent of the bilateral trade between India and Bangladesh.

== Communication ==
The Petrapole-Benapole rail link was opened in 2001 after being closed for 24 years. There is a proposal to construct a by-pass road to ease congestion on the present road, connecting Benapole to NH 112 (earlier NH 35), bypassing Bangaon. On 9 November 2017, nearly 10 years after Kolkata-Dhaka passenger train was flagged off after a gap of 43 years, a new train – Bandhan Express – was inaugurated between Kolkata and Khulna in Bangladesh (via Petrapole and Benapole), covering a distance of about 172 km. This is a weekly train and runs on Thursdays from both sides.

== Gallery ==
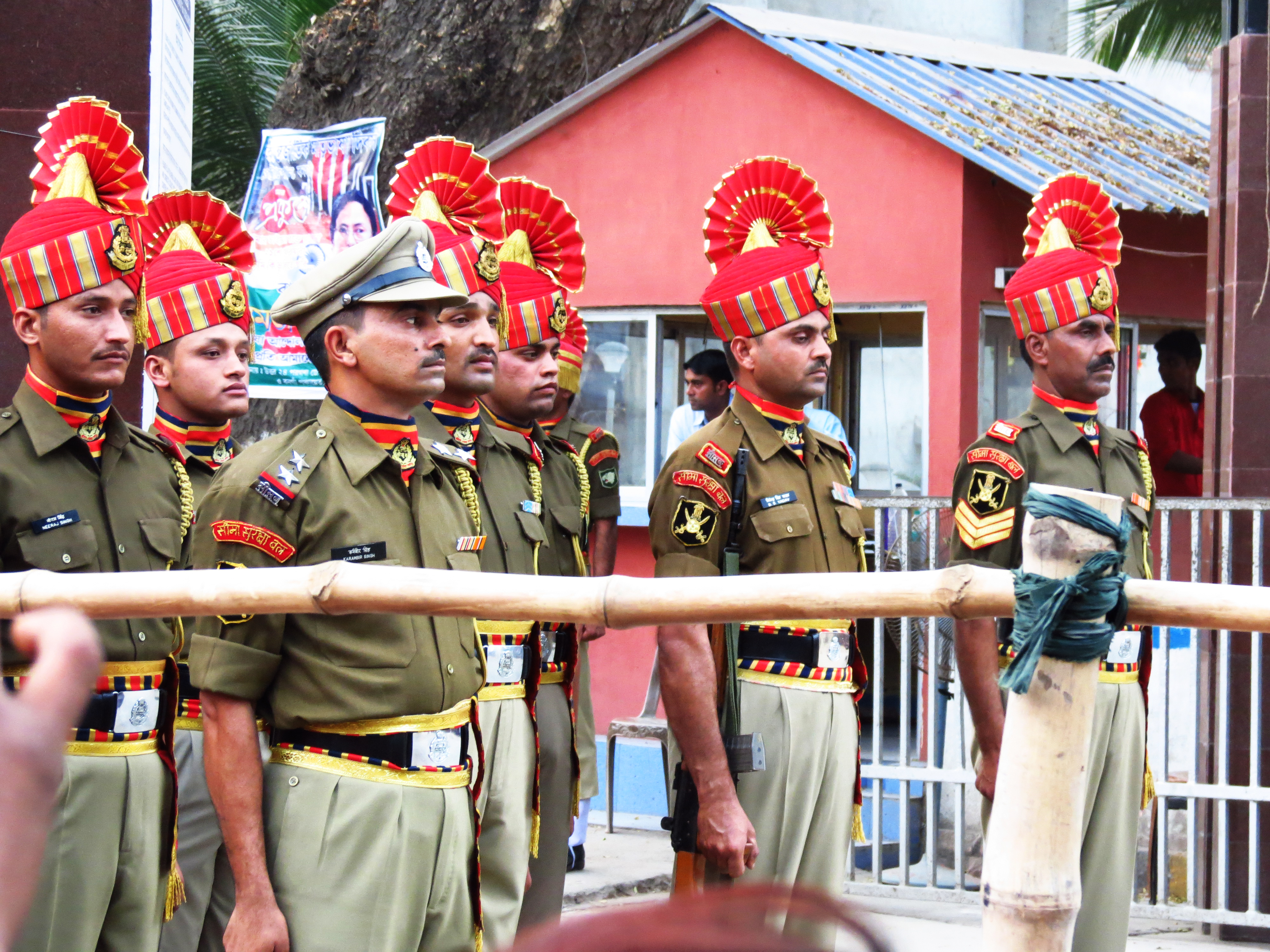
BSF at Petrapole

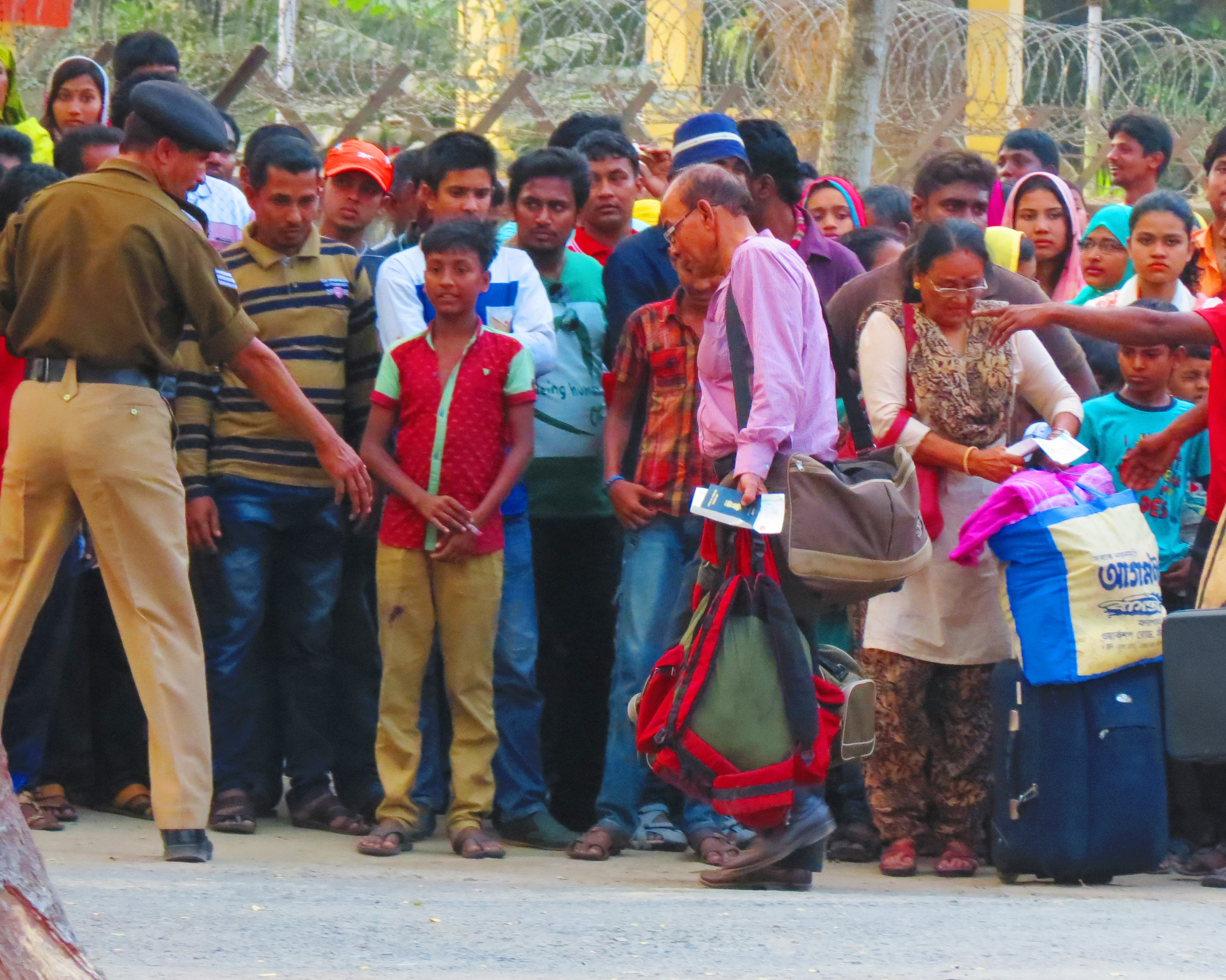
Crossing Border at Petrapole

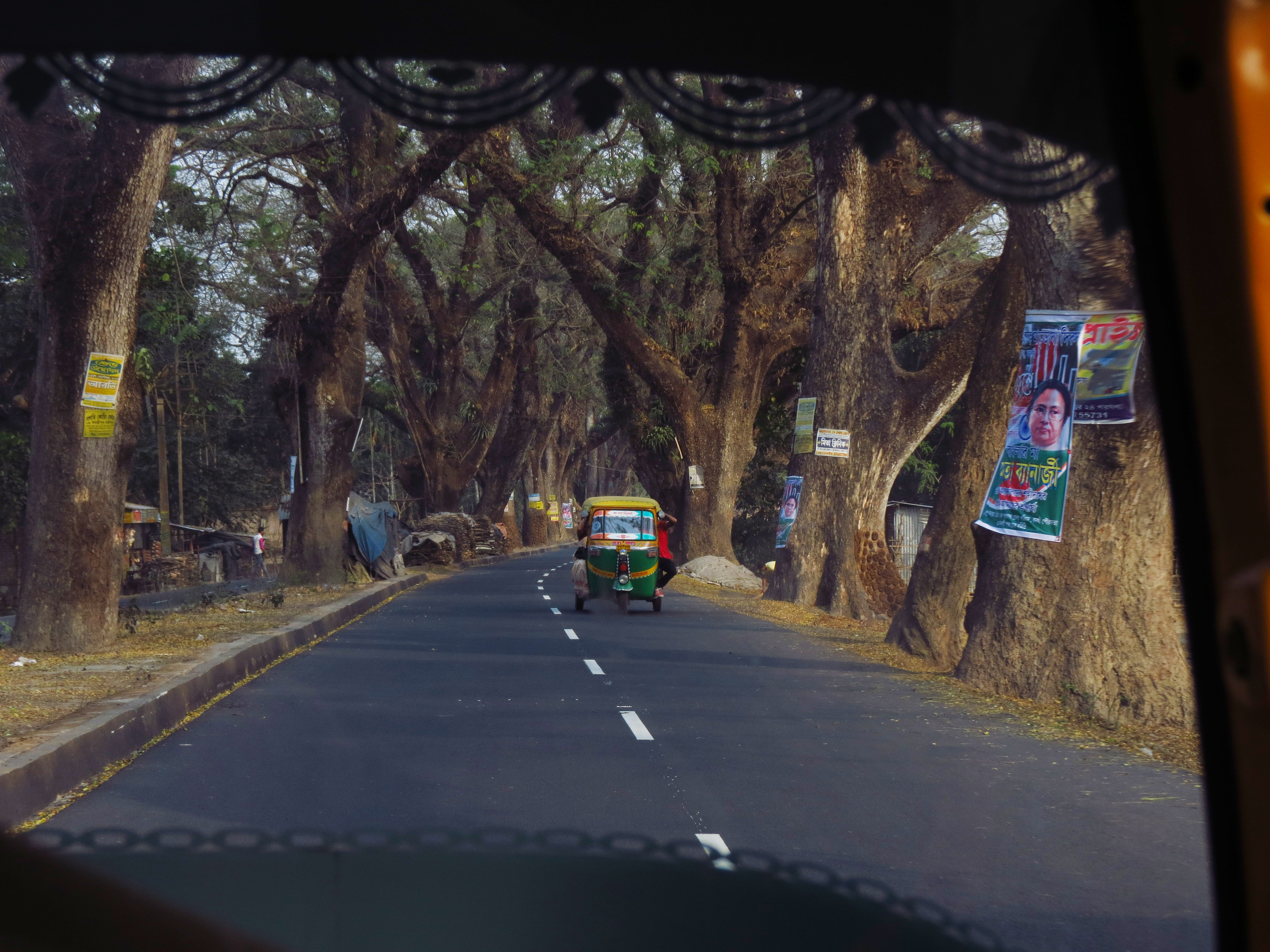
En route to Petrapole

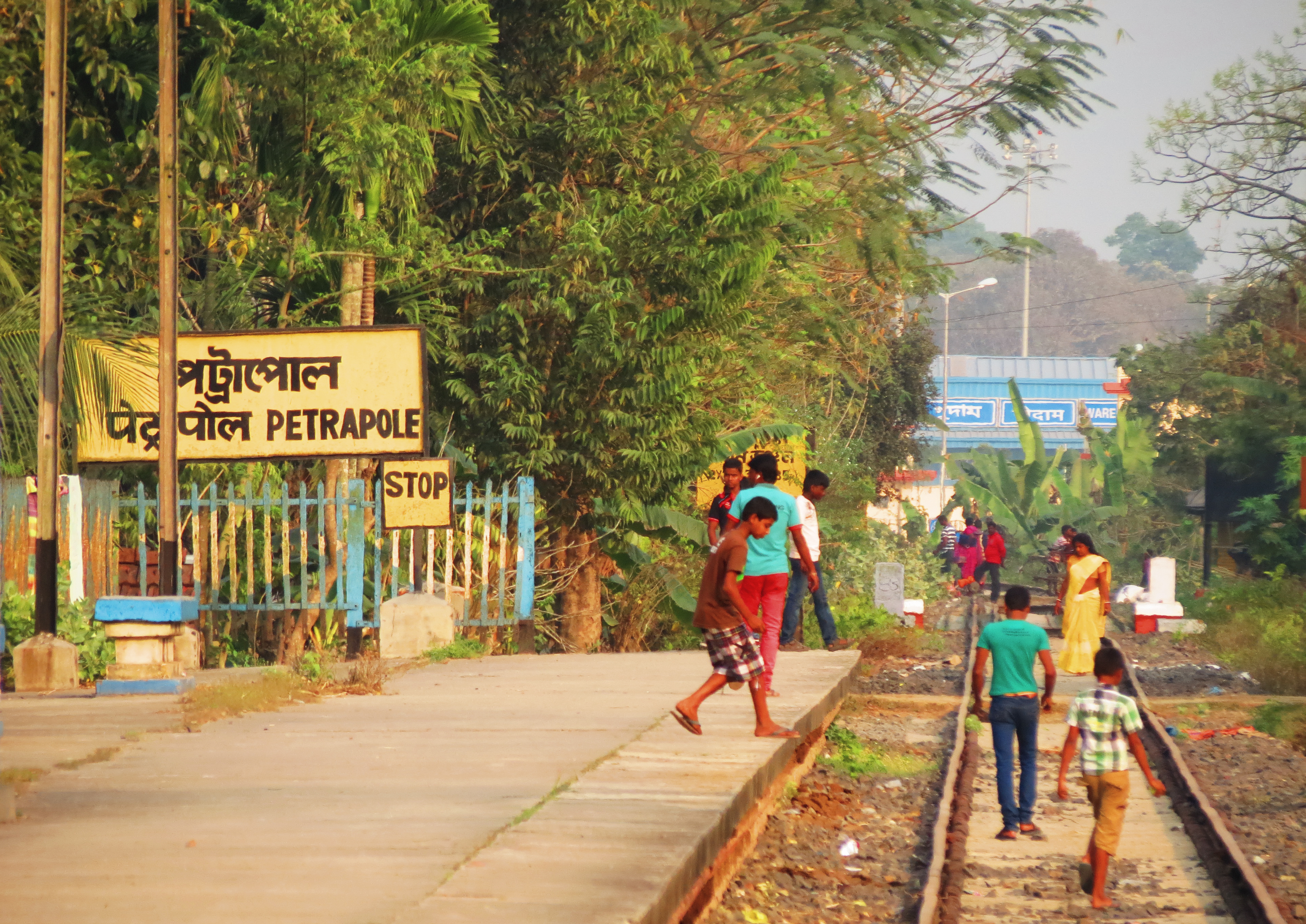
Petrapole railway station

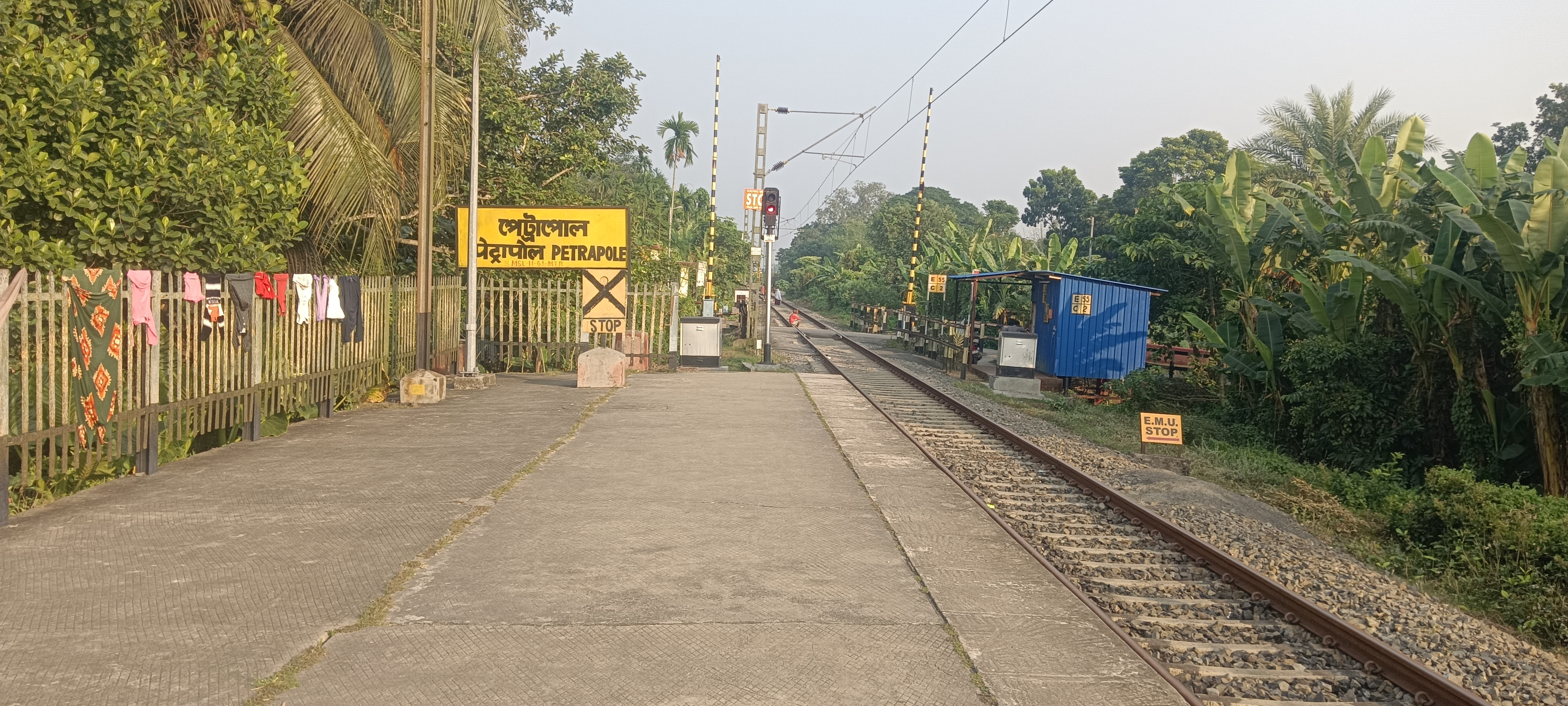
Petrapole railway station

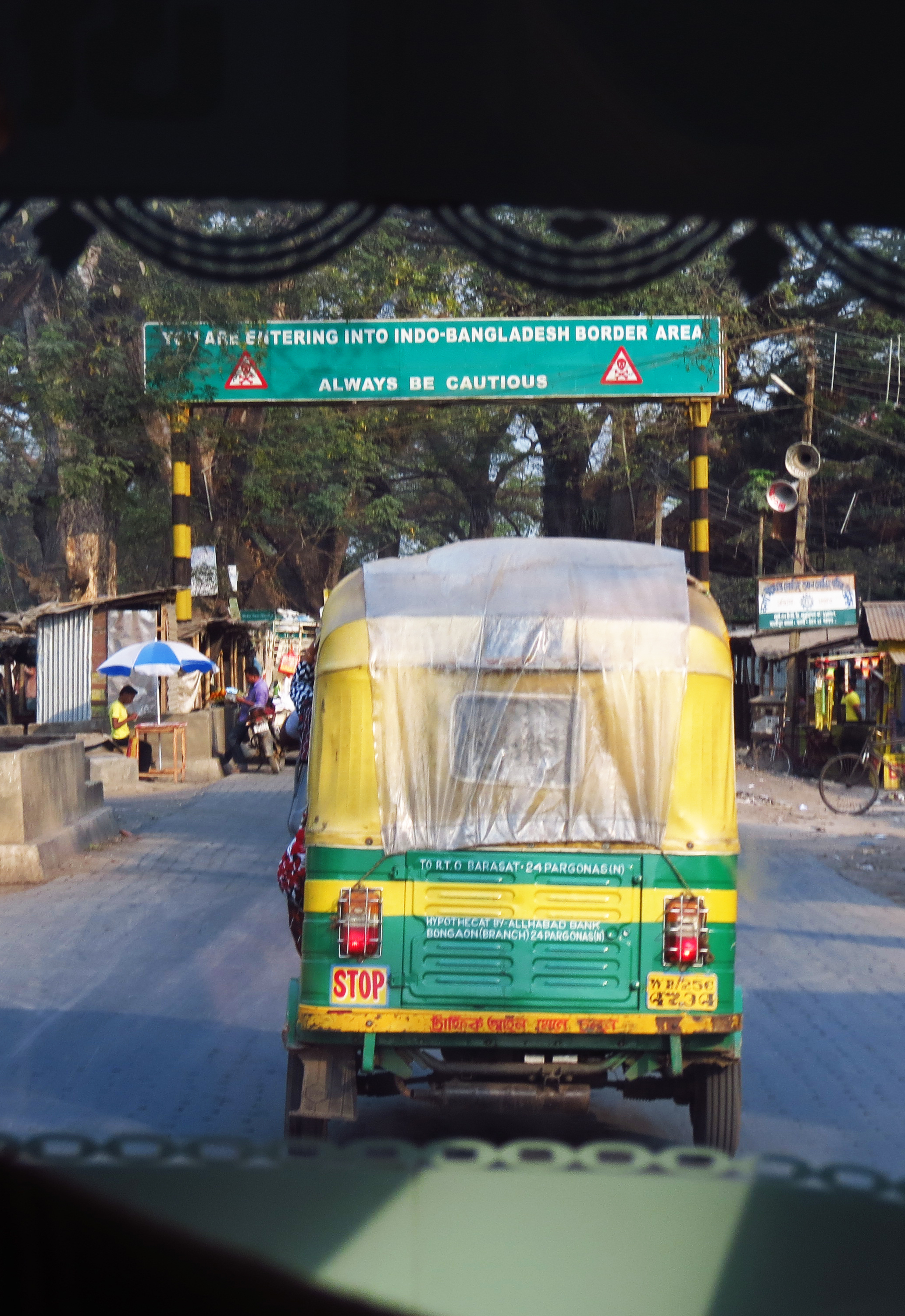
Auto to Petropole

== See also ==
- Benapole Border Crossing
