= Akhaura Land Port =

- Click on the map for a fullscreen view

Location
- Country: Bangladesh
- Location: Akhaura, Brahmanbaria
- Coordinates: 23.8480°N 91.2384°E

Details
- Opened: 2011
- Type of harbour: dry port

Akhaura Land Port is a major port in eastern Bangladesh. It is important for international trade with Northeastern India. The Indian side of the port is also known as Agartala Land port.

== See also ==
- Benapole land port
- Bhomra Land Port
- Hili Land Port
