= Benapole land port =

Benapole Land Port
- Click on the map for a fullscreen view
- Location in Bangladesh

Location
- Country: Bangladesh
- Location: Benapole, Jessore
- Coordinates: 23.0426194°N 88.893623°E

Details
- Opened: 1947
- Type of harbour: dry port

Benapole Land Port, is the largest land port of Bangladesh located in Benapole town of Sharsha Upazila in the Jessore District. This port is used to export-import good with India through Benapole-Petrapole border. This port is governed by Bangladesh Land Port Authority. About 90% of the imported Indian goods enter Bangladesh through this port.

== History ==
Benapole land port was established as a Land Customs station and later it was turned into a Customs Division in 1984. It was transformed into a Custom House in 1997 and in 2009 new buildings were constructed in the location and Benapole Customs and Immigration Check post started its operation since then.

== See also ==
- Benapole Border Crossing
