= Tamabil Land Port =

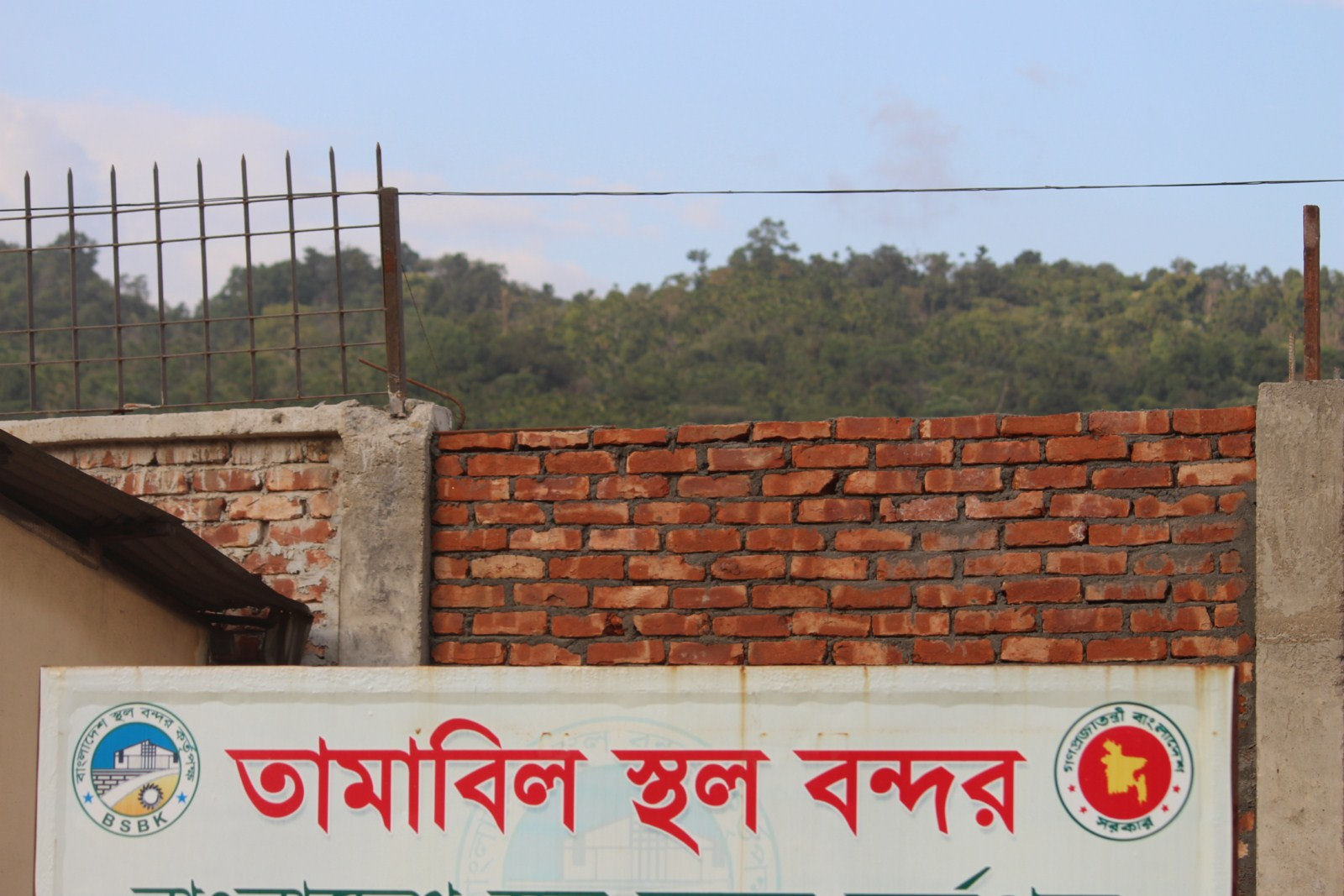
- Tamabil Land Port

- Location in Bangladesh

Location
- Country: Bangladesh
- Location: Tamabil, Sylhet
- Coordinates: 25.1815612°N 92.0369152°E

Details
- Opened: 2013
- Type of harbour: dry port

Tamabil Land Port aka Tamabil Port is one of the major port in Bangladesh. It is located at Tamabil in the Sylhet District. The Indian side of the port known as Dawki Port.

== History ==
The port was first opened as Boarder check point and Boarder Crossing point in 1971. Then only Passenger can cross through here. But in 2002 Both Bangladesh and Indian Government announced to open it as a full function port. And after 15 years of declaration it open as a port in 2017.
