= Banglabandha =

- Border crossing for vehicles
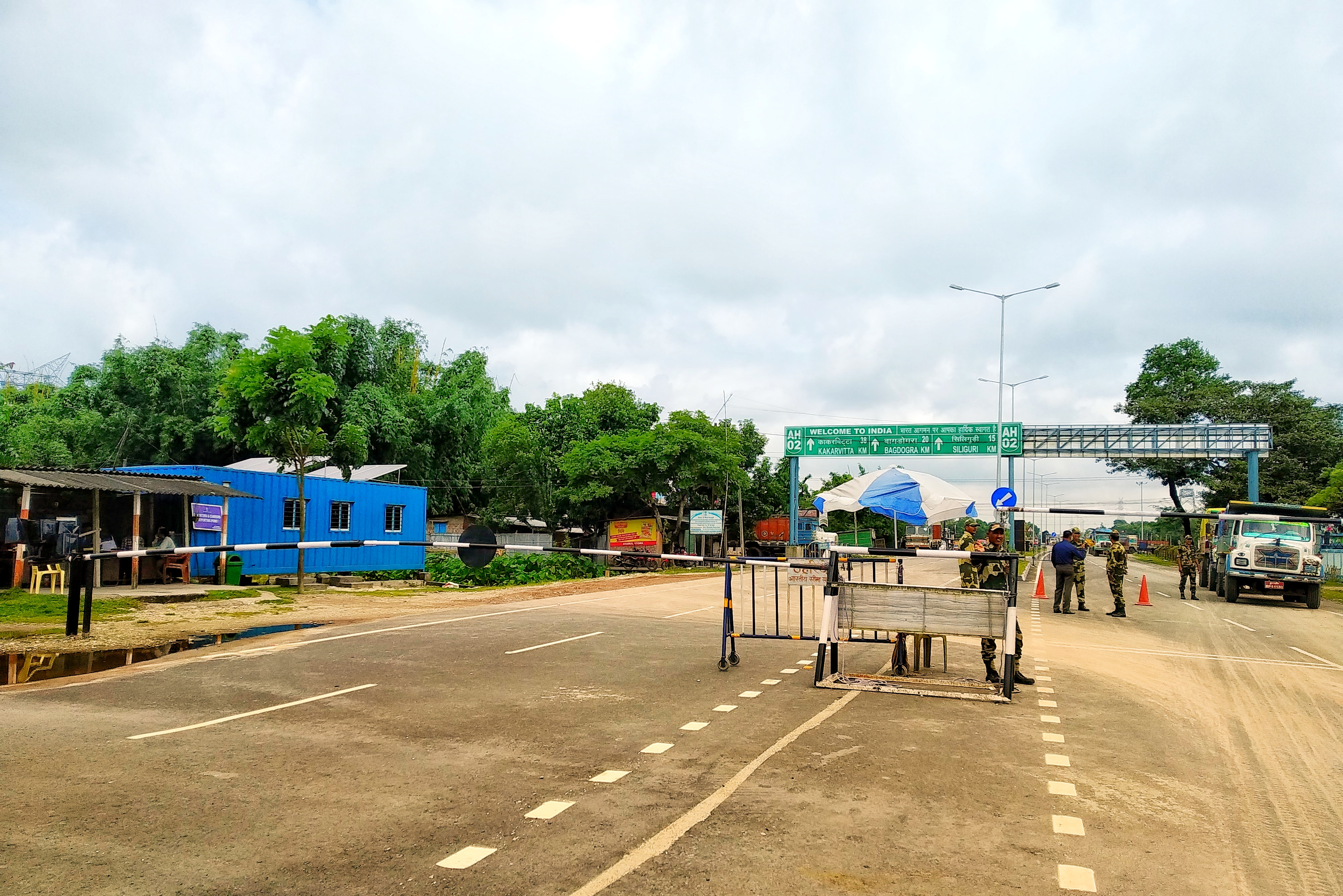
- Border crossing at Banglabandha

- Location in Bangladesh
- Coordinates: 26.6295°N 88.4126°E
- Country: Bangladesh
- Division: Rangpur Division
- District: Panchagarh District
- Time zone: UTC+6 (BST)

Banglabandha is a major inland port in northern Bangladesh established to provide a trade link with India, Nepal and Bhutan. The three nations are separated by 52 km (32 mi) of Indian territory, known as the Siliguri Corridor. On the Indian side of the border is Phulbari. Border crossing of vehicles between Phulbari and Banglabandha was inaugurated in January 2011.

== History ==
Despite the geographical proximity of the borders of India, Bangladesh, Nepal and Bhutan, the issues of border control and territorial sovereignty have obviously prevented the establishment of direct trade routes. Banglabandha was functioning as a "Land Customs Station" (LCS) before the Government of Bangladesh decided to establish an inland port. To exploit the potential of a three-way trading post, the government of Bangladesh decided to develop an inland port, with facilities such as customs, banking, warehouses, police and immigration posts. It was designed to be Bangladesh's first "export-oriented" inland port, explicitly promoting the transport of Bangladeshi goods to Nepal, India and Bhutan; other Bangladeshi inland ports are mainly used to import goods from India. Nepal favours such an inland port to enable access for its goods to the Mongla and Chittagong seaports.

== Geography ==
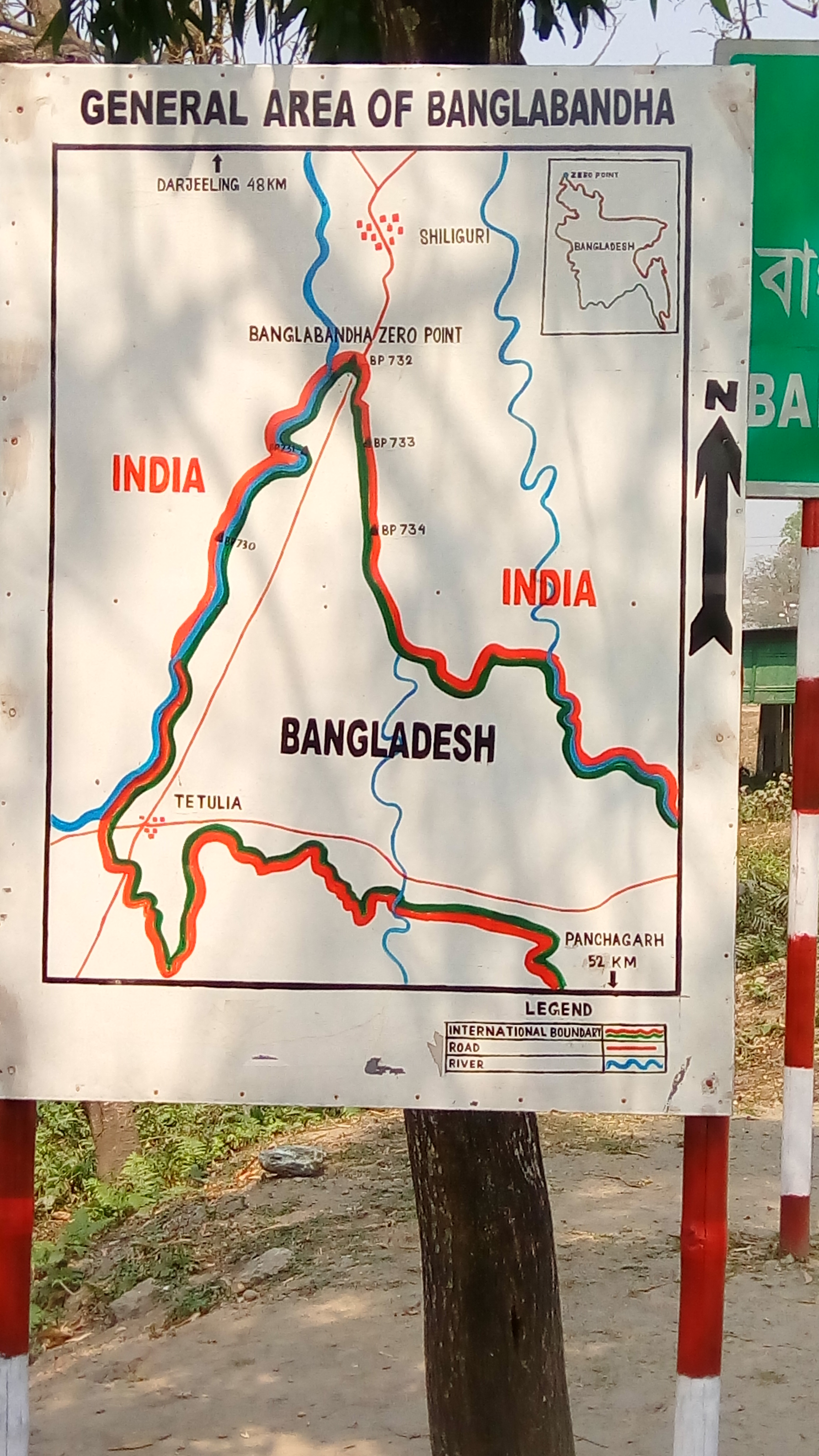
Banglabandha Land Port Border

The Banglabandha land port is located at the tip of northwestern Bangladesh at 26°37′46″N 88°24′45″E. It is 57 km (35 mi) north of the Panchagarh town and 7 km (4.3 mi) from Siliguri and Jalpaiguri, in the Indian state of West Bengal. The Indian city of Darjeeling is 58 km (36 mi) away to the north. Kankarbhitta, the India-Nepal border transit point for third countries, is 61 km (38 mi) away and the India-Bhutan border is 68 km (42 mi) away from the Indo-Bangladesh boundary near which Banglabandha stands.

== Function ==
The Banglabandha port was formally inaugurated in May 2004 but has not been fully functional owing to the absence of a transit agreement for the use of Indian territory as a transport route for Bangladeshi, Nepalese and Bhutanese trade cargoes. Nepali transport trucks are not allowed entry into Bangladesh and must exchange their cargo at the "zero point" of the Indo-Bangladesh border. Indian authorities also limit transport from Nepal to Bangladesh to only two hours a day.

India has been blamed for preventing development of South Asian road connectivity. India fears China gaining access to Bangladesh and into the Bay of Bengal. As such the benefits of decades long Bangladesh initiatives to promote regional trade remains stillborn.

The existing Indo-Nepalese agreement provides for cross-border transport between the two countries, but no arrangement for use of Indian territory to link Nepal and Bangladesh. But in 2010, a joint communique issued by the Prime Minister of India Dr. Manmohan Singh and the Bangladesh Prime Minister Sheikh Hasina Wajed said both countries would co-operate to provide Nepalese and Bhutanese cargo access to the Bangladesh ports. The commerce secretaries of Nepal and Bangladesh also held high-level talks to form an agreement resolving the transit issues between the two countries.

== Border crossing for vehicles ==
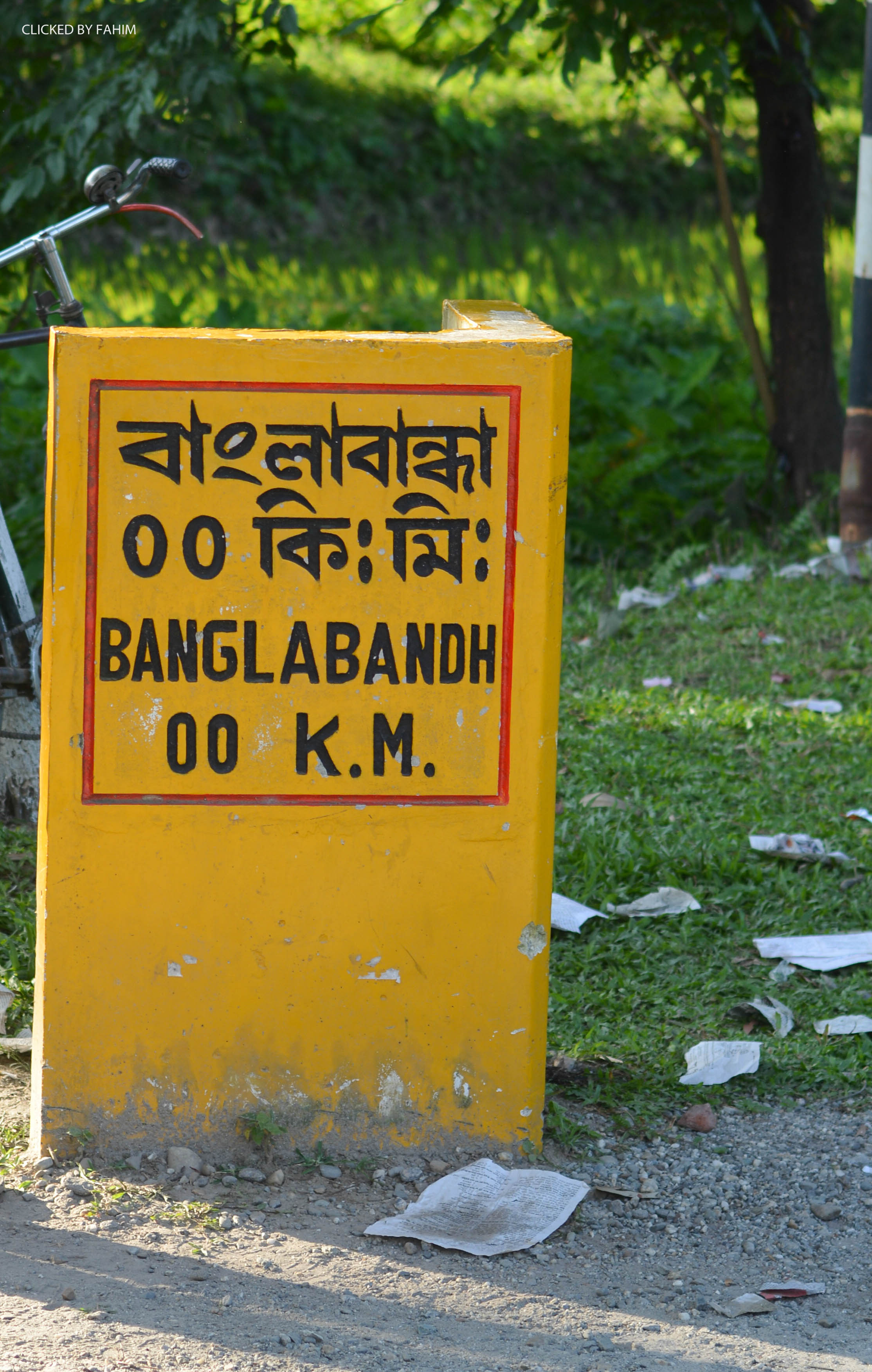
Banglabandha Zero point

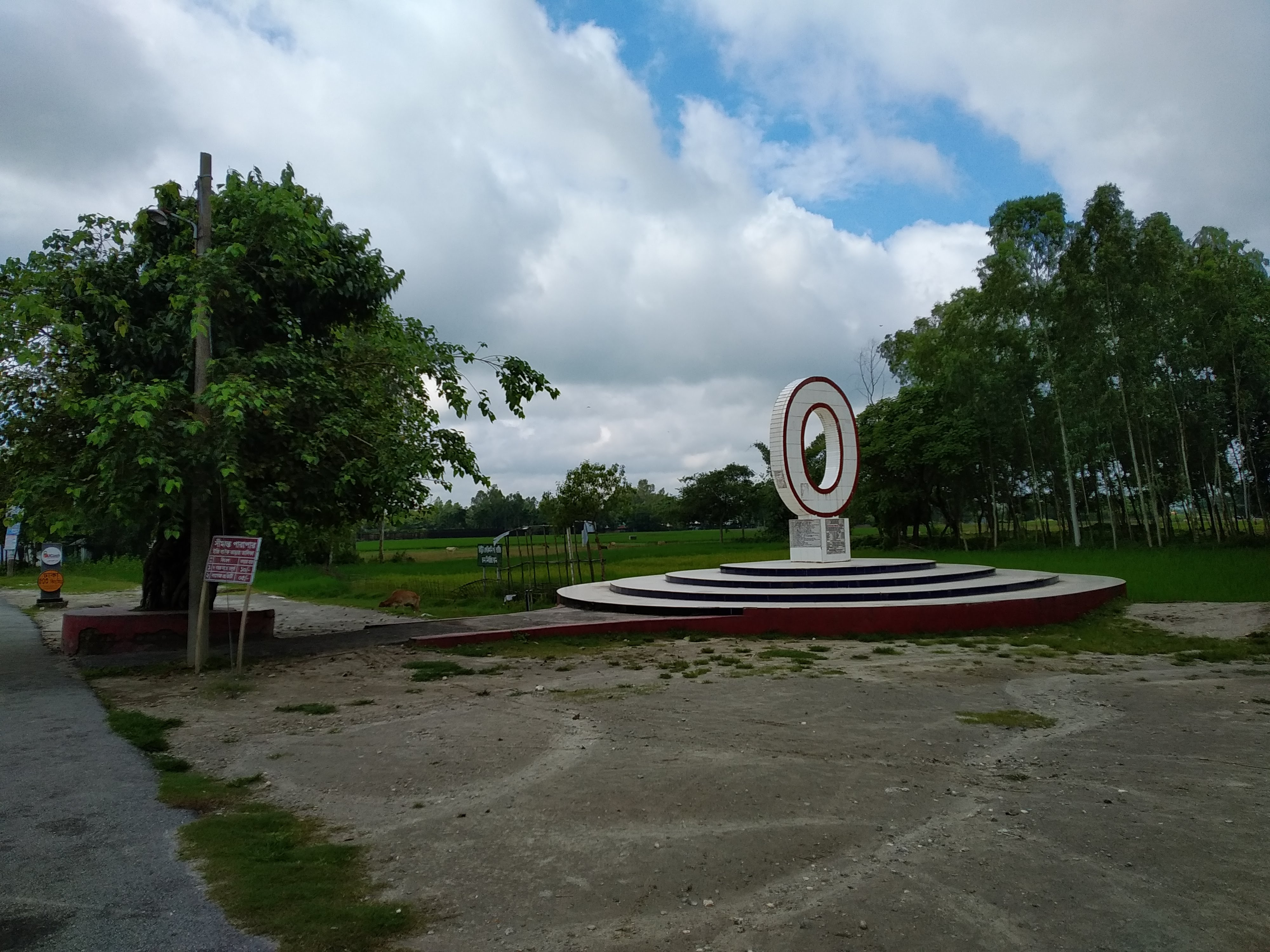
Banglabandha Zero Point

Border crossing of vehicles between Phulbari and Banglabandha was inaugurated in January 2011. Earlier, Nepal-Bangladesh transit through the border started in a limited way in 1997. Goods-laden trucks from both sides cross the border and unload the goods at warehouses in the other country. There is no arrangement for the crossing of human beings.

Bangladesh started export of fertiliser to Nepal using the Rahanpur-Singhabad rail transit point in November 2011.

As per Addendum to the Memorandum of Understanding between Bangladesh and India to facilitate overland transit traffic between Bangladesh and Nepal signed on 6 September 2011, "The existing rail route through Radhikapur Railway station in India and Biral Railway Station in Bangladesh which has been suspended shall be brought into operation by converting Bangladesh portion into broad gauge."
