= Birampur Upazila =

Birampur বিরামপুর
- Upazila
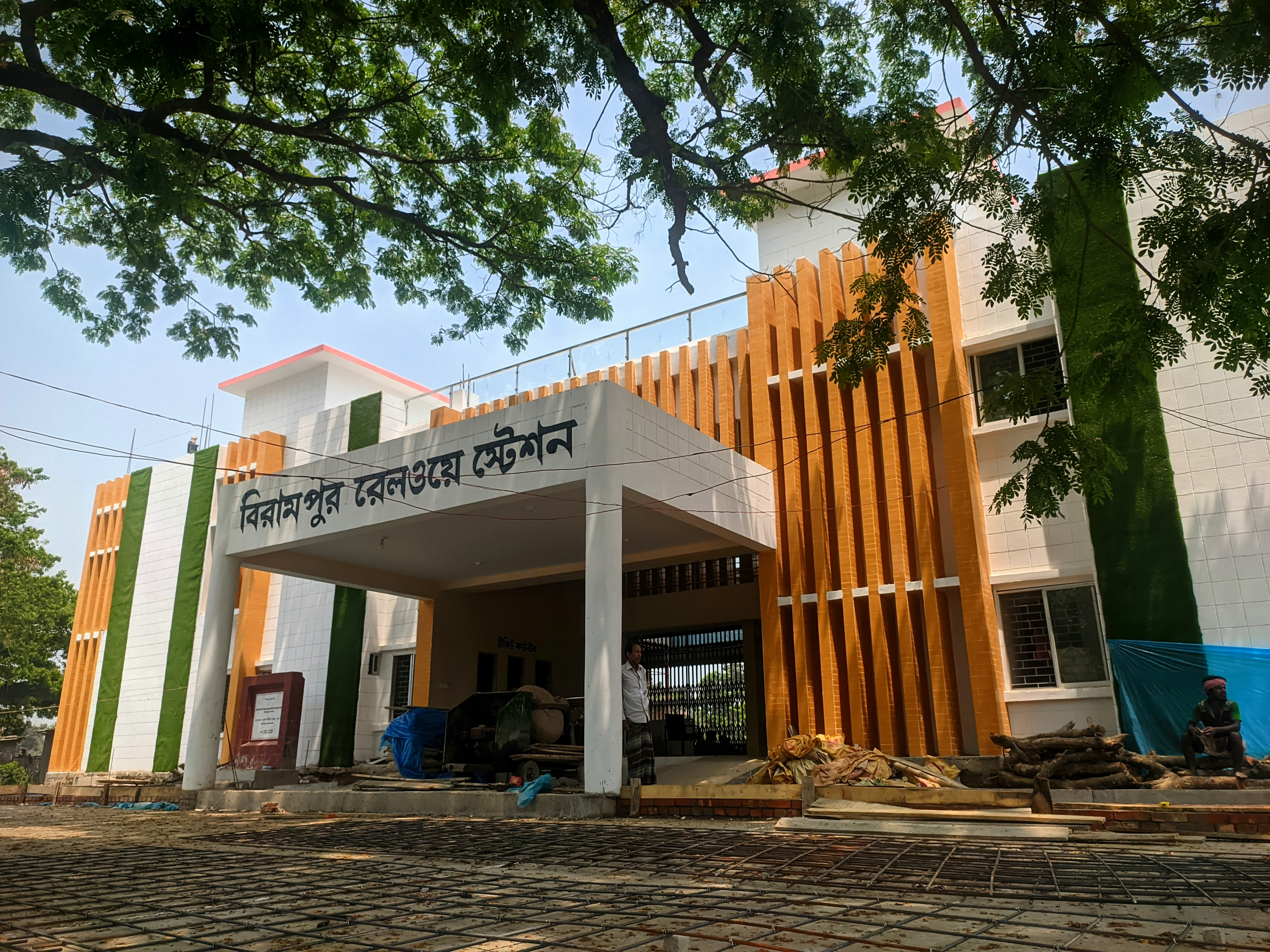
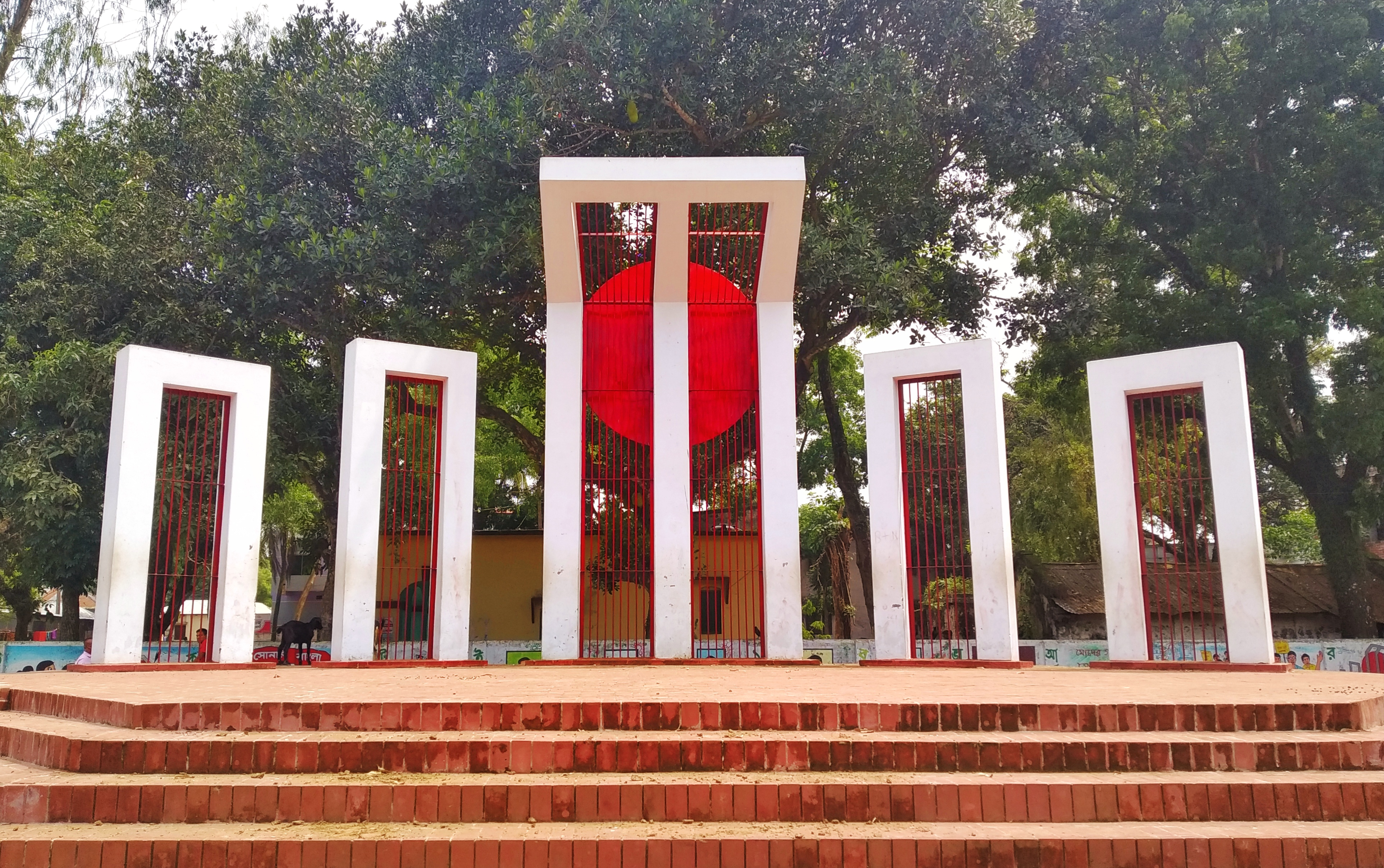
- Birampur Railway Station Shaheed Minar "Dhaka Morr" The main point of Birampur Upazilla.

- Coordinates: 25.391479°N 88.992111°E
- Country: Bangladesh
- Division: Rangpur
- District: Dinajpur

Government
  - Chief Executive Officer: Nujhat Tasnim Ayon

Area
  - Total: 212.88 km^{2} (82.19 sq mi)

Population (2022)
  - Total: 184,144
  - Density: 865.01/km^{2} (2,240.4/sq mi)
- Time zone: UTC+6 (BST)
- Postal code: 5266
- Website: birampur.dinajpur.gov.bd

Birampur Upazila mauza geocode map

Birampur (Bengali: বিরামপুর) is an upazilla of Dinajpur District in the Division of Rangpur, Bangladesh. Birampur is an important city near India Border. This upazila is 256 km away from Capital Dhaka and nearly 56 km away from Dinajpur City. In spite of being far from Capital this north Bengal city is flourishing economically and culturally. A branch of the Jamuna River flows through Birampur Upazila.

== Geography ==
Birampur has 42,140 households and total area 212.88 km^{2}. It is an upazila of Dinajpur.

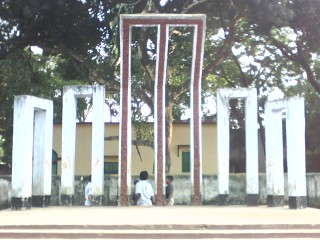
Sohed Minar of Birampur

Birampur Upazilla is bounded by Fulbari and Nawabganj Upazillas on the north, Nawabganj and Hakimpur Upazillas on the east, Hakimpur Upazila and Hili CD Block in Dakshin Dinajpur district, West Bengal, India, on the south and Kumarganj CD Block in Dakshin Dinajpur district, West Bengal, India, on the west.

=== Rivers and lakes ===
- Jamuna
- Asholar Beel
- Chengar Beel
- Bogghar Beel
- Katuar Beel

== Demographics ==
Religions in Birampur Upazila (2022)
Religion	Percent
Islam	90.01%
Hinduism	6.76%
Christianity	2.95%
Other or not stated	0.27%

According to the 2022 Bangladeshi census, Birampur Upazila had 49,692 households and a population of 184,144. 8.09% of the population were under 5 years of age. Birampur had a literacy rate (age 7 and over) of 76.14%: 78.43% for males and 73.90% for females, and a sex ratio of 98.63 males for every 100 females. 54,538 (29.62%) lived in urban areas. Ethnic population is 5713 (3.10%), of which Santals were 4203.

According to the 2011 Census of Bangladesh, Birampur Upazila had 42,140 households and a population of 170,806. 34,329 (20.10%) were under 10 years of age. Birampur had a literacy rate (age 7 and over) of 51.64%, compared to the national average of 51.8%, and a sex ratio of 977 females per 1000 males. 47,539 (27.83%) lived in urban areas. According to 2022 census, total population was 184,144. Ethnic population was 5,713(3.10%) in which Santal people was 7,014.

Population of upazila by ethnicity (2022)
1. Bengali (96.9%)
2. Santal (2.28%)
3. Others (0.82%)

As of the 1991 Bangladesh census, Birampur has a population of 134778. Males constitute 51.12% of the population, and females 48.88%. This Upazilla's eighteen up population is 68878. Literacy rate and educational institutions Average literacy 46.9%; male 51.7%, female 42%. In 2001, The Population of Birampur was 150620; male 77517, female 73103; Muslim 134654, Hindu 8142, Christian 3689, Buddhist 40 and others 4095. The Density of Forestry in Birampur is approximately 18.5%.

== Administration ==
UNO: Nuzhat Tasneem Awon.

Birampur Thana was formed on 17 June 1981, and it was turned into an upazila in 1983.

Birampur Upazilla is divided into Birampur Municipality and seven union parishads: Benail, Dior, Jotbani, Katla, Khanpur, Mukundapur, and Pali Prayagpur. The union parishads are subdivided into 171 mauzas and 169 villages.

Birampur Municipality was formed in 1995. It was subdivided into 9 wards and 26 mahallas.

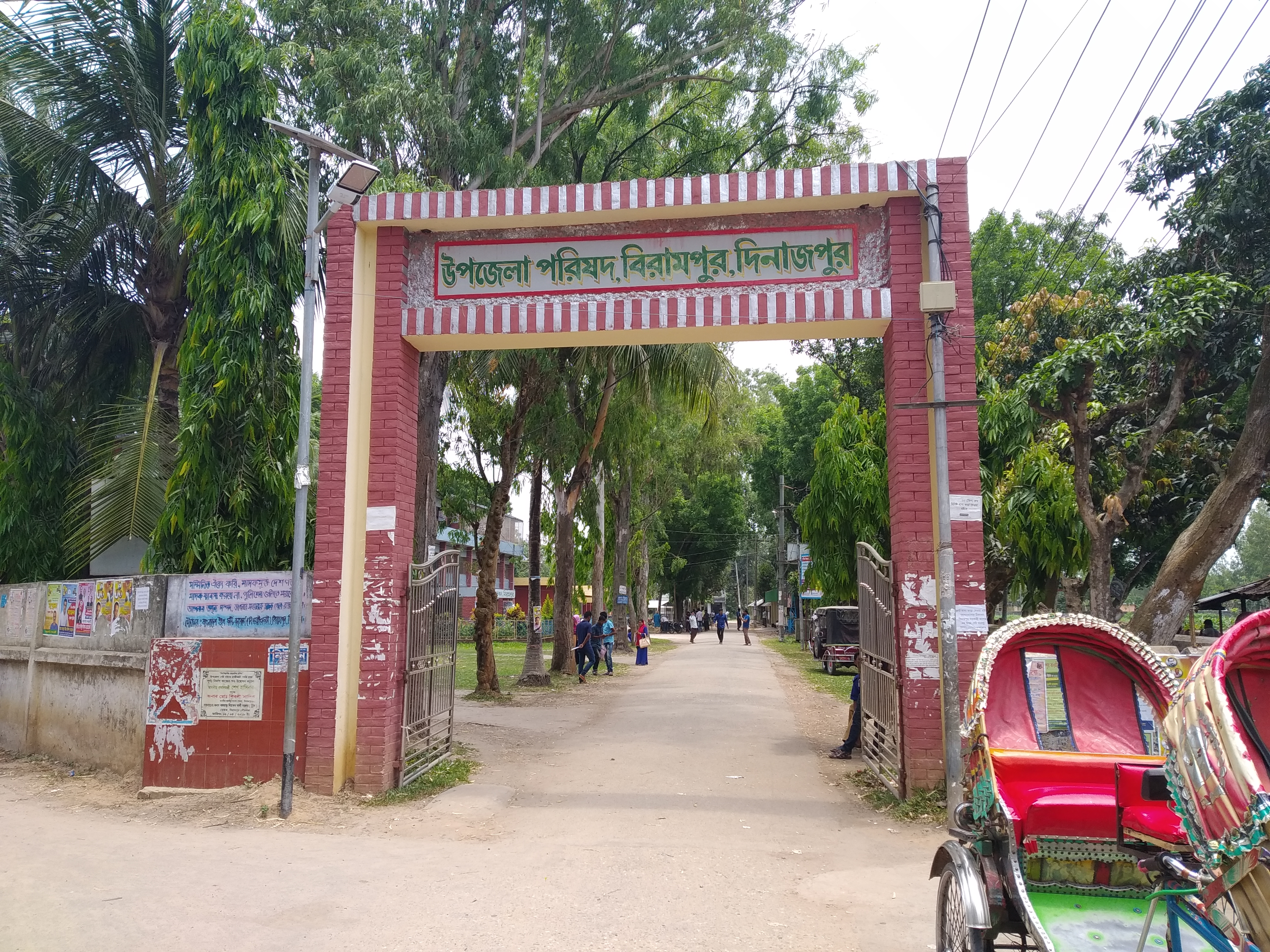

Md. Khairul Alam Raju is now the Upazila Chairman in the Upazila Chairman election. Election held on 18 March 2019. And so on Md. Liakat Ali Sarker Tutul is working as Mayor of Birampur Pouroshova.

Unions of Birampur
Serial	Name of Union	Chairman
01	Dior	Abul Hossain
02	Benail	Nazir Hossen
03	Jotbani	Eyakub
04	Katla	Hafizur Rahman
05	Khanpur	Shahidul Islam
06	Mukundapur	Abdur Razzaq
07	Pali Prayagpur	Rahmat Ali

== Economy ==
The main sources of income Agriculture 68.37%, non-agricultural labourer 2.92%, industry 0.86%, commerce 13.08%, transport and communication 2.64%, service 5.1%, construction 0.67%, religious service 0.16%, rent and remittance 0.17% and others 6.03%. Ownership of agricultural land landowner 57.24%, landless 42.76%; agricultural landowner: urban 44.34% and rural 61.34%. The main crops of Birampur are paddy, wheat, corn, jute, potato, vegetables. Mustard, sugarcane and sesame are near extinction. The main fruits are mango, banana, jackfruit, and blackberry. There are 17 fisheries, dairies and poultries.

== Contributions ==
=== Liberation War 1971 ===
History of the War of Liberation On 20 April 1971, the Pak army killed a few hundred innocent people at Charar Hat of Birampur. Seven Pakistani soldiers and 16 freedom fighters were killed in a direct encounter between the freedom fighters and the Pakistan army at Ketra Hat. On 4 December the general public of the upazila attacked a military vehicle of the Pak army at Beparitola and killed a number of Pak soldiers.

== Education ==
The upazila has 5 colleges, 1 textile institute, 38 secondary schools, 162 primary schools, 28 madrasas. There is also a digital school in the upazila named Birampur ICT School.

=== Educational institutions ===
- Birampur Government College (1964)
- Birampur Mahila Degree College (1989)
- Birampur Technical and Management College (2001)
- Adarsha High School and Vocational Institute (1994)
- Birampur Pilot High School (1945)
- Ekair Mangalpur High School (1930)
- Shibpur High School (1951)
- Birampur Government Girl's High School (1971)
- Ideal High School (1998)
- Shiyala Government Primary School (1964)
- Bijul Darul Huda Kamil Madrasa (1958)
- Mukundapur Senior Madrasa (1974)
- Birampur ICT School (2018)
- Katla High School (1966)

== Gallery ==
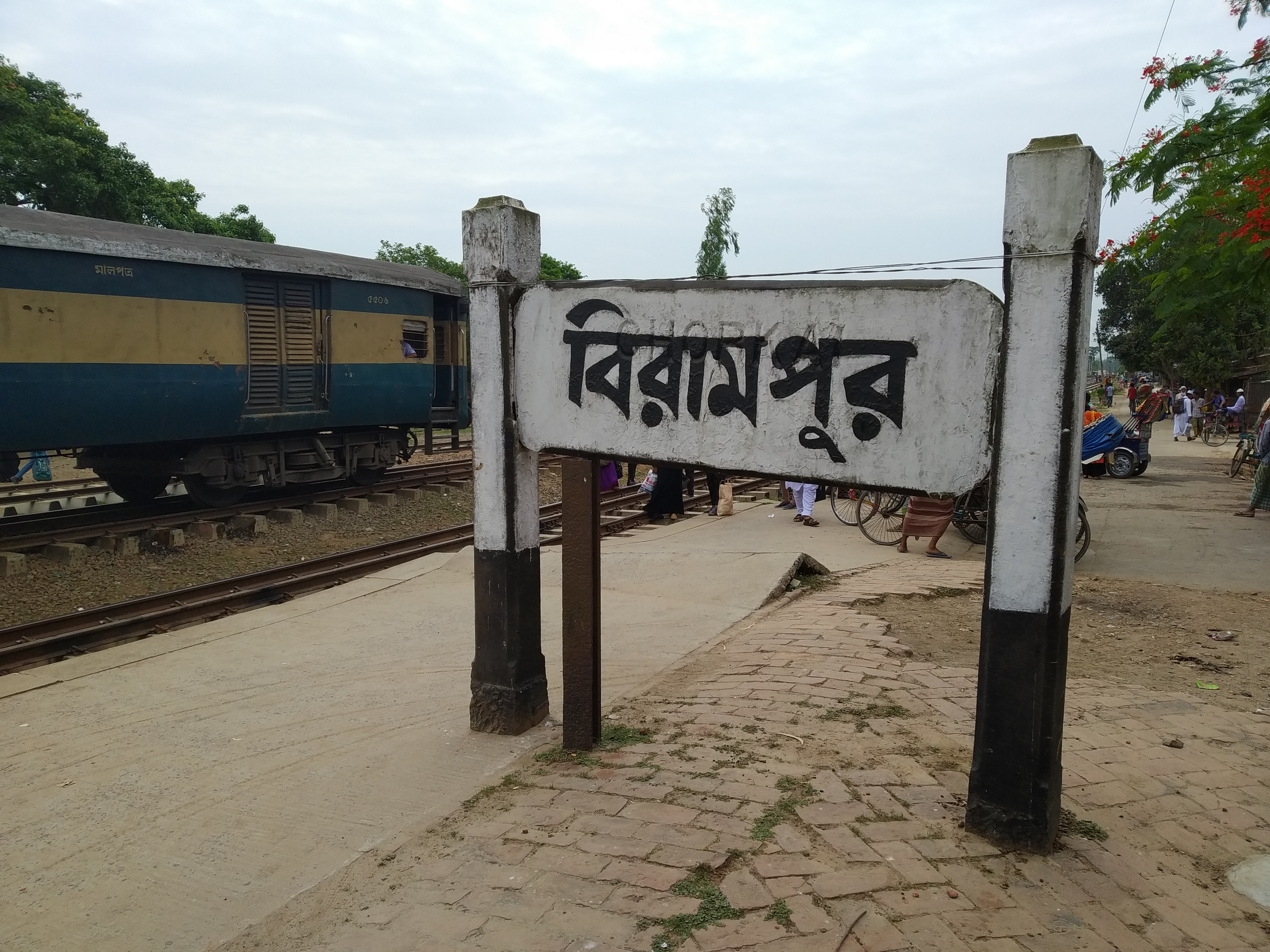
Birampur Railway Station

== See also ==
- Upazilas of Bangladesh
- Districts of Bangladesh
- Divisions of Bangladesh
