= Intergovernmental Agreement on Dry Ports =

2013 United Nations treaty

The Intergovernmental Agreement on Dry Ports is a 2013 United Nations treaty designed to promote the cooperation of the development of dry ports in the Asia-Pacific region. It was concluded under the auspices of the United Nations Economic and Social Commission for Asia and the Pacific (UNESCAP) and is open to ratification by any state that is a UNESCAP member.

The agreement aims to promote "international recognition of dry ports, facilitating investment in dry port infrastructure, improving operational efficiency and enhancing the environmental sustainability of transport."

== Creation ==
The Agreement was adopted in Bangkok on 1 May 2013 by a resolution of UNESCAP and was opened for signature on 7 November 2013. It remained open for signature until 31 December 2014 and entered into force on 23 April 2016, after having been ratified by the requisite eight states.

== Status ==
As of November 2016, the Agreement has been signed by 17 states. It has been ratified or acceded to by 11 states: Afghanistan, Bangladesh, China, India, Kazakhstan, Mongolia, Russia, South Korea, Tajikistan, Thailand, Turkmenistan, and Vietnam. It entered into force on 23 April 2016.

== Content ==
The Agreement identifies a number of existing and potential dry port locations that are to be the basis of a coordinated effort to creates nodes along an international integrated intermodal transport and logistics system. Annex I of the Agreement identifies the dry ports subject to the agreement, and Annex II contains the principles underlying the development and operation of these ports.

=== Annex I dry ports ===
The following dry ports are identified in Annex I of the Agreement. Potential dry port locations are italicised. "ICD" is an abbreviation for "Inland Container Port". Many of the locations are situated on the border between two states. Once the Agreement enters into effect, the Annex I list can be amended by a two-thirds vote of the state parties to the Agreement.

==== Afghanistan ====
- Aqeena, Faryab
- Islam Qala, Herat Province
- Shirkhan Bander Dry Port, Kondoz
- Torkham Dry Port, Jalalabad
- Hairatan Dry Port, Mazar-e-Sharif
- Kabul Dry Port, Kabul
- Speenboldake Chaman Dry Port, Kandahar
- Turghundi, Herat Province

==== Armenia ====
- Akhuryan Logistic Center
- Gyumri Airport
- Karmir Blur / Apaven Cargo Terminal
- Zvartnots International Logistic Center

==== Azerbaijan ====
- Baku Cargo Terminal of Heydar Aliyev International Airport, Baku
- Heydar Aliyev International Airport, Baku
- Balakan Cargo Terminal, Azerbaijan–Georgia border
- Bilasuvar Cargo Terminal, Azerbaijan–Iran border
- Gabala International Airport, Gabala
- Ganja International Airport, Ganja
- Julfa Cargo Terminal, Azerbaijan–Iran
- Lenkoran International Airport, Lenkoran
- Nakhichevan International Airport, Autonomous Republic of Nakhichevan
- Silk Way Cargo Terminal, Baku
- Zagatala International Airport, Zagatala
- Baku City Goods Depot, Khirdalan Station
- Cargo Terminal on frontier point at state border, Samur
- Cargo Terminal on frontier point at state border, Sinig-Korpu
- Container Terminal of Baku International Sea Trade Port, Baku
- Ganja Station, Ganja
- International Logistics Centre, Alyat
- Keshla Station, Baku
- New Baku International Sea Trade Port, Alyat
- South Terminal on frontier point at state border (Astara)
- Sumgait Station, Sumgait

==== Bangladesh ====
- Akhaura, Brahmanbaria
- Benapole, Jessore
- Bibirbazar, Comilla
- Burimari, Lalmonirhat
- Hili, Dinajpur
- Kamlapur ICD, Dhaka
- Sonamasjid, Chapai Nawabganj
- Teknaf, Cox's Bazar
- Bangladbandh, Panchagarh
- Bhomra, Satkhira
- Bilonia, Feni
- Dhirasram ICD, Gajipur
- Gobrakura, Mymensingh
- Koraitali, Mymensingh
- Nakugao, Sherpur
- Ramgarh, Khagrachari
- Tamabil, Sylhet

==== Bhutan ====
- Phuentsholing Dry Port, Phuentsholing
- Gelephu, Sarpang
- Gomtu, Samtse
- Nganglam, Samdrupjongkhar
- Samdrupjongkhar, Samdrupjongkhar
- Samtse, Samtse

==== Cambodia ====
- CWT Dry Port, Phnom Penh
- Olair World Wide Dry Port, Phnom Penh
- Phnom Penh International Port, Phnom Penh
- Phnom Penh Special Economic Zone, Phnom Penh
- So Nguon Dry Port, Bavet
- Tech Srun Dry Port, Phnom Penh
- Teng Lay Dry Port, Phnom Penh

==== China ====
- Changchun Xinglong Bonded International Logistics Port, Changchun
- Erenhot South International Logistics Center, Erenhot
- Harbin Highway Freight Hub Station (Harbin Longyun Logistics Park), Harbin
- Hekou Port Transport Logistics Park, Hekou
- Horgos International Logistics Park, Horgos
- Hunchun International Logistics Park, Hunchun
- Jinghong Mengyang International Logistics Trading Center, Jinghong
- Kashi International Logistics Park, Kashi
- Tengjun International Land Port, Kunming
- Manzhouli New International Freight Yard, Manzhouli
- Nanning Bonded Logistics Center, Nanning
- Pingxiang Border Trade Logistics Center, Pingxiang (Youyi Guan)
- Ruili Cargo Centre, Ruili
- Suifenhe Cargo Centre, Suifenhe
- Xinjiang Railway International Logistics Park, Urumqi
- Yiwu Inland Port Station, Yiwu
- Zhangmu Port Warehouse Logistics Trading Center, Zhangmu

==== Georgia ====
- Poti Free Industrial Zone, Poti
- Tbilisi International Logistics Centre, Tbilisi

==== India ====
- Ajni, Nagpur, Maharashtra
- Amingaon, Guwahati, Assam
- Aroor, Kerala
- Ballabhgarh, Faridabad, Haryana
- Bhadohi, Sant Ravidas Nagar, Uttar Pradesh
- Bhagat Ki Kothi, Jodhpur, Rajasthan
- Chehreta, Amritsar, Punjab
- Dadri, Noida, Uttar Pradesh
- Daulatabad, Aurangabad, Maharashtra
- Dhandarikalan, Punjab
- Dhannad Rau, Indore, Madhya Pradesh
- Dronagiri Node, Navi Mumbai, Maharashtra
- Durgapur, West Bengal
- Garhi Harsaru, Gurgaon, Haryana
- Hili, Dakshin Dinajpur district, West Bengal
- Irugur, Coimbatore, Tamil Nadu
- Jamshedpur, Jharkhand
- Janory, Nasik, Maharashtra
- Kanakpura, Jaipur, Rajasthan
- Kanpur, Uttar Pradesh
- Khodiyar, Gujarat
- Loni, Ghaziabad, Uttar Pradesh
- Mahadipur, Malda district, West Bengal
- Majerhat, Kolkata, West Bengal
- Mandideep, Bhopal, Madhya Pradesh
- Moradabad, Uttar Pradesh
- Patli, Gurgaon, Haryana
- Pithampur, Dhar, Madhya Pradesh
- Raipur, Chhattisgarh
- Sachin, Surat, Gujarat
- Sanath Nagar, Hyderabad, Andhra Pradesh
- Senewal, Ludhiana, Punjab
- Tondiarpet, Chennai, Tamil Nadu
- Tughlakabad, Delhi
- Vadodara, Gujarat
- Whitefield, Bangalore, Karnataka

==== Indonesia ====
- Gedebage Dry Port, Bandung
- Cikarang Dry Port, Bekasi

==== Iran ====
- Imam Khomeini International Airport, Tehran province
- Motahari Rail Station, Mashhad, Khorasan Razavi Province
- Salafchegan Special Economic Zone, Qom province
- Sirjan Special Economic Zone, Kerman province
- Arvand Free Industrial Zone, Khozestan Province
- Sahlan Special Economic Zone, Tabriz, East Azerbaijan province
- Sarakhs Special Economic Zone, Khorasan Razavi Province
- Shahid Dastgheyb International Airport, Shiraz, Fars province
- Zahedan Logistics Centre, Sistan and Bakluchestan Province

==== Kazakhstan ====
- Aktobe Centre, Aktobe
- Damu Industrial and Logistics Centre, Almaty
- High Tech Logistics, Almaty Region
- Korgas International Border Cooperation Centre, Almaty Region
- Tau Terminal, Almaty Region

==== Kyrgyzstan ====
- Alamedin, Bishkek
- Osh, Osh

==== Laos ====
- Thanaleng, Vientiane
- Houyxai, Bokeo
- Laksao, Borikhamsai
- Luangprabang, Luangprabang
- Nateuy, Luangnamtha
- Oudomsai, Muangxai
- Pakse, Champasack
- Seno, Savannakhet
- Thakhek, Khammouane

==== Malaysia ====
- Inland Clearance Depot Kontena Nasional, Prai
- Inland Container Depot, Padang Besar
- Internal Clearance Depot Seri Setia, Kuala Lumpur
- Ipoh Cargo Terminal, Ipoh
- Nilai Inland Port, Nilai
- Tebedu Inland Port, Sarawak
- Pulau Sebang Inland Depot, Pulau Sebang

==== Mongolia ====
- Altanbulag
- Sainshand
- Ulaanbaatar
- Zamyn-Uud
- Choibalsan

==== Myanmar ====
- Bago
- Mandalay
- Mawlamyine
- Monywa
- Muse
- Pyay
- Tamu
- Yangon

==== Nepal ====
- Bhairahawa ICD, Bhairahawa
- Biratnagar ICD, Biratnagar
- Birgunj ICD, Birgunj
- Kakarbhitta ICD, Kakarbhitta
- Tatopani ICD, Larcha

==== Pakistan ====
- Customs Dry Port, Hyderabad
- Customs Dry Port, Peshawar
- Faisalabad Dry Port Trust, Faisalabad
- Lahore Dry Port, Mughalpura
- Margalla Dry Ports, Islamabad
- Multan Dry Port Trust, Multan
- National Logistics Center Container Freight Station, Lahore
- National Logistics Center Dry Port, Quetta
- Pakistan Railways Prem Nagar Dry Port, Kasur
- Railways Dry Port, Quetta
- Sambrial Dry Port, Sialkot
- Silk Route Dry Port, Sost, Gilgit, Baltistan

==== Philippines ====
- Clark, Angeles City
- Davao City
- Koronadal
- Laguindingan, Misamis Oriental
- Zamboanga City

==== Russia ====
- Janino Logistic Park, Saint Petersburg Region
- Multimodal Logistic Complex "Rostov universal port", Rostov-on-Don Region
- Terminal Logistics Centre "Baltiysky", Leningrad Region
- Terminal Logistics Centre "Kleshchiha", Novosibirsk
- Terminal Logistics Centre "Doskino", Nizhny Novgorod
- Dmitrovsky Multimodal Centre, Moscow Region
- Kaliningrad
- Kazan
- Multimodal Logistic Complex "Southern Primorsky Terminal", Primorsky Region
- Svijazhsky Multimodal Logistic Centre, Tatarstan
- Terminal Logistics Centre "Primorsky" Ussuriysk, Primorsky Region
- Terminal Logistics Centre "Tamansky", Krasnodar Region
- Terminal Logistics Centre "Beliy Rast", Moscow Region
- Volgograd
- Yekaterinburg

==== South Korea ====
- Uiwang ICD, Uiwang

==== Sri Lanka ====
- Peliyagoda, Colombo
- Telangapata, Colombo

==== Tajikistan ====
- Dushanbe, Dushanbe
- Karamyk, Jirgital
- Khujand, Khujand
- Kurgan-Tube, Kurgan-Tube
- Nizhniy Panj, Qumsamgir
- Tursunzade, Tursunzade
- Vakhdat, Vakhdat

==== Thailand ====
- Lat Krabang ICD, Bangkok
- Chiang Rai, Chiang Khong
- Natha, Nong Khai

==== Turkey ====
- Gelemen, Samsun
- Kazan, Ankara
- Bogazkopru, Kayseri
- Bozuyuk, Bilecik
- Gokkoy, Balikesir
- Habur
- Halkali, Istanbul
- Hasanbey, Eskişehir
- Kaklik, Denizli
- Kars
- Kayacik, Konya
- Köseköy, Kocaeli
- Mardin
- Palandoken, Erzurum
- Sivas
- Turkoglu, Kahramanmaras
- Usak
- Yenice, Mersin
- Yesilbayir, Istanbul

==== Vietnam ====
- ICD Lào Cai, Lào Cai Province
- ICD Song Than, Bình Dương Province
- ICD Tan Cang-Long Binh, Đồng Nai Province
- ICD Tien Son, Bắc Ninh Province
- Hanoi
- ICD Gia Lai, Gia Lai Province
- ICD Vĩnh Phúc, Vĩnh Phúc Province
- Lạng Sơn
