= Katlamari, West Bengal =

Village in West Bengal, India

Katlamari
- Village
- Location within West Bengal Location within India
- Coordinates: 24°16′27″N 88°34′50″E
- Country: India
- State: West Bengal
- District: Murshidabad
- Block: Raninagar- II

Government
  - Type: Sarpanch

Area
  - Total: 16.10 km^{2} (6.22 sq mi)
- Elevation: 21 m (69 ft)

Population (2011)
  - Total: 33,290
  - Density: 2,068/km^{2} (5,355/sq mi)

Languages
  - Official: Bengali
- Time zone: UTC+5:30 (IST)
- PIN: 742308
- STD code: 03482
- Vehicle registration: WB-57

Katlamari is a village in West Bengal, India. It is located near the Bangladesh–India border, about 37 kilometres northeast of the district seat Berhampore. As of 2011, Katlamari had a population of 33,290, in 7,555 households.

== Geography ==
Katlamari is located on the south bank of Padma River, and is surrounded by the villages of Sarandajpur, Nabipur, Babaltali and Majhardiar. The village covers an area of 1610.05 hectares.

== Demographics ==
Per the 2011 Census, Katlamari had a population of 33,290, including 16,960 males and 16,330 females. The working population made up 32.63% of the overall population. The literacy rate was 53.77%, with 9,286 of the male inhabitants and 8,613 of the female inhabitants being literate.
