= Hili Land Port =

- Click on the map for a fullscreen view
- Location in Bangladesh

Location
- Country: Bangladesh
- Location: Hili, Dinajpur
- Coordinates: 25.2816°N 89.0092°E

Details
- Opened: 1972
- Type of harbour: dry port

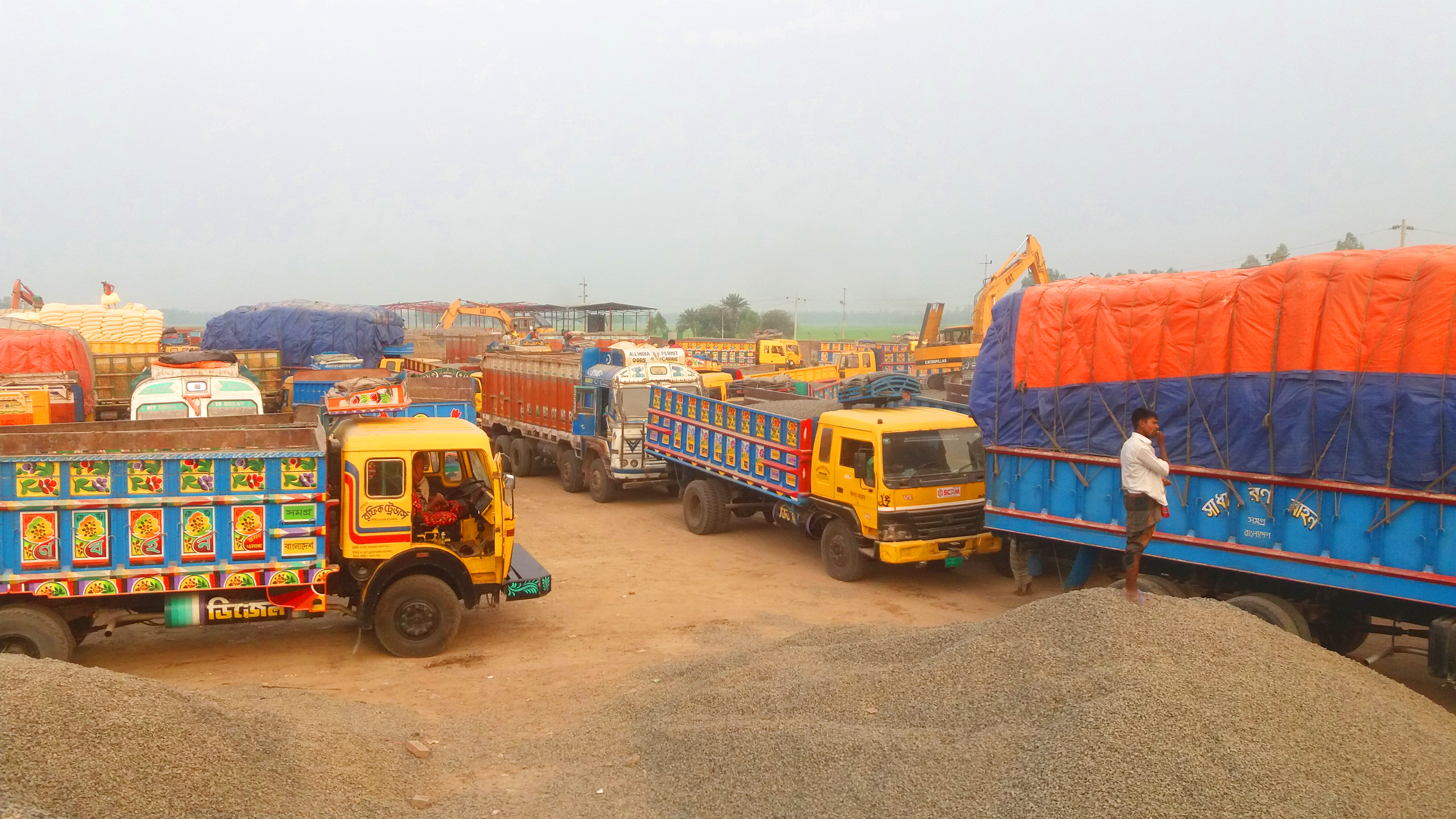
Truck in Hili land port

Hili land port is a border checkpoint situated at Hakimpur Upazila in Dinajpur district, on the Bangladesh-India border.

== Land Port ==
Hili Land Port covers an area of 10,000 acres and has a storage capacity of 10,000 MT. In 1985–86, the Hili customs station was established for export-import business between Bangladesh and India. Later in 1996, it was declared by the government a full-fledged customs station. In 2005, the government handed over the port for private management. In November 2007 Panama Hili Port Link Limited took lease the port for 25 years. On the Indian side, the land port and border check post is at Hili, Dakshin Dinajpur.

Intergovernmental Agreement on Dry Ports is a 2013 United Nations treaty designed to promote the cooperation of the development of dry ports in the Asia-Pacific region.

== Revenue earned ==
The port earned revenue of Tk85 crore in the first six months of current fiscal year 2012–13, exceeding the annual target Tk55 crore by 150 per cent.
