= 2026 Meghalaya border fencing protests =

India–Bangladesh border protests

- Date: June 2026
- Location: Lyngkhong, East Khasi Hills district, Meghalaya, India
- Caused by: Opposition to the proposed alignment of the India–Bangladesh border fence
- Methods: Demonstrations, petitions, memoranda
- Status: Ongoing

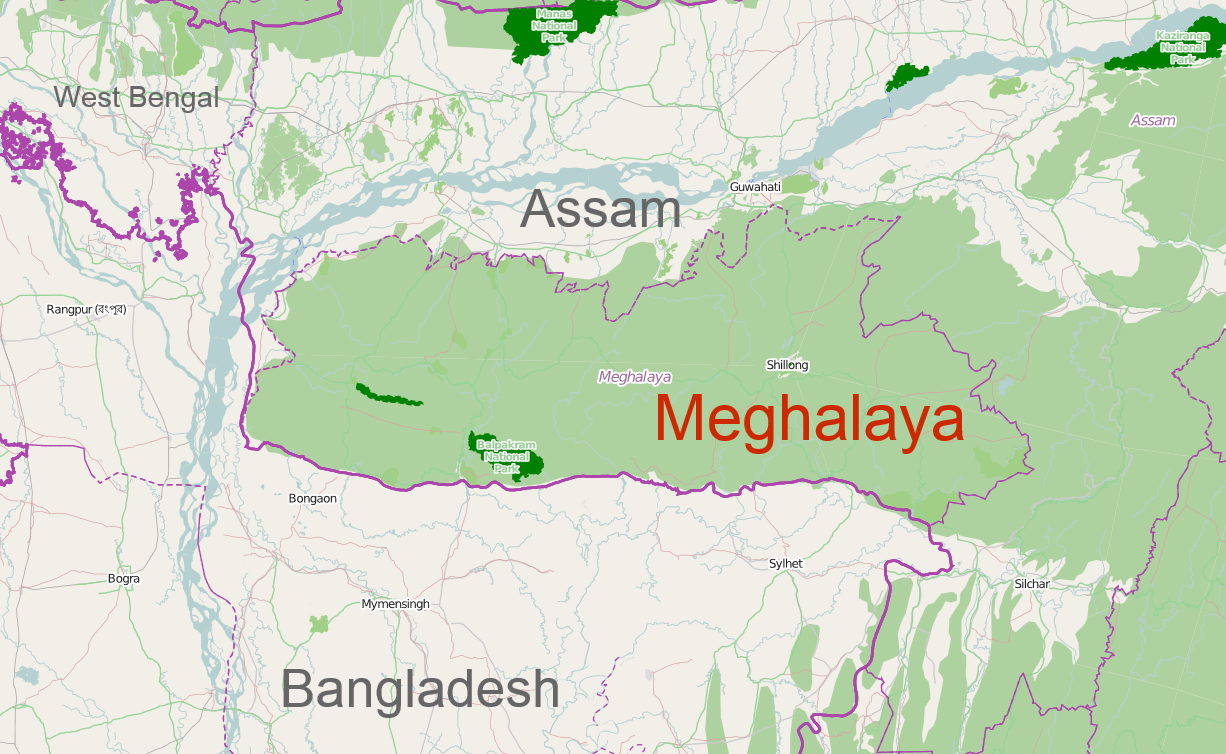
Map of Meghalaya, India

Since June 2026, residents of Lyngkhong village in East Khasi Hills district have led protests against the proposed alignment of fencing along the India–Bangladesh border. Protesters argued that the proposed alignment would leave the village still inside of Indian territory, but outside of the fenced area, and thus affect residents' access to land and public services.

== Background ==
Meghalaya shares an international border of approximately 443 kilometres (275 mi) with Bangladesh. Border fencing has been part of India's efforts to strengthen border security and address cross-border crime and unauthorised movement.

By 2026, a majority of the border fencing project in Meghalaya had been completed. According to Chief Minister Conrad K. Sangma, approximately 90 percent of the state's border fencing had been finished by May 2026.

Concerns regarding the location of border fencing have periodically emerged in frontier villages where residents fear that settlements or agricultural land may be left outside the fenced area. Such concerns became prominent in Lyngkhong village during 2026.

== Protests ==
On 7 June 2026, residents of Lyngkhong, a village along the India–Bangladesh border in Meghalaya's East Khasi Hills district, staged a demonstration against the proposed alignment of the border fence. Protesters submitted a memorandum to the Sub-Divisional Officer of Pynursla, requesting that the fencing be constructed along the zero line rather than further inside Indian territory.

Village representatives stated that the proposed alignment would leave Lyngkhong outside the fenced area, raising concerns about access, security, and the future of the settlement. Residents argued that the village should remain within both Indian territory and the fenced perimeter.

According to reports, protesters stated that they supported the construction of border fencing but opposed the proposed alignment because of concerns that it would isolate the village from the rest of India by leaving it in front of the border fence, although technically still in Indian territory. The demonstration took place while border fencing work continued in the area as part of efforts to secure the India–Bangladesh frontier.

== Government response ==
A senior official of the Border Security Force (BSF) stated that construction of the border fence was continuing as part of efforts to secure the India–Bangladesh frontier. Separately, a senior Home Department official stated that India had taken up with Bangladesh the issue of constructing a single-row fence along the zero line in areas where human settlements could be affected. According to the official, discussions had been initiated on the proposal to erect a single-row fence along the zero line in such areas. The official also stated that the Bangladeshi government had not yet taken a decision on the proposal.

During the 57th Director General-level talks between the Border Guard Bangladesh (BGB) and the Border Security Force (BSF) held in June 2026, the BGB raised concerns over at least 39 deviations in security-related fencing projects along the India–Bangladesh border and called for adherence to agreed border construction protocols. The BGB reiterated that prior concurrence from relevant Bangladeshi authorities is required for any construction within 150 yards of the border under existing bilateral understandings.

== Geopolitical context ==
The protests took place amid increased attention to migration and border management issues along the India–Bangladesh frontier. In June 2026, India and Bangladesh agreed to expand intelligence-sharing and coordinate border patrols in response to concerns regarding undocumented migration and cross-border movement.

The issue also emerged during a period of heightened discussion regarding migration, border security, and repatriation procedures between the two countries. Reuters reported that Bangladesh strengthened vigilance along parts of the border amid disputes concerning alleged cross-border pushbacks and migration-related tensions.

== Reactions ==
Residents of Lyngkhong village expressed concern that the proposed fence alignment could leave the settlement outside the fenced area and urged authorities to construct the barrier along the zero line. Community representatives submitted a memorandum to local officials requesting a review of the proposed alignment.

A senior Home Department official stated that the Government of India had raised with the Government of Bangladesh a proposal to construct a single-row border fence along the zero line in areas where settlements could otherwise be affected by the standard fencing alignment.

== See also ==
- India–Bangladesh border
- India–Bangladesh relations
- Border Security Force
- Politics of Meghalaya
- Immigration to India
