= Mahadipur =

- Border checkpoint
- Location in West Bengal, India Mahadipur (India)
- Coordinates: 24.8566°N 88.1248°E
- Country: India
- State: West Bengal
- District: Malda

Population (2011)
  - Total: 8,638

Languages
  - Official: Bengali, English
- Time zone: UTC+5:30 (IST)
- PIN: 732216
- STD/ Telephone code: 03512
- Lok Sabha constituency: Maldaha Dakshin
- Vidhan Sabha constituency: English Bazar
- Website: malda.nic.in

Mahadipur is a village in English Bazar CD block in Malda Sadar subdivision of Malda district in the state of West Bengal, India and is a border checkpoint, on the Indian side of the Bangladesh-India border, with Sonamosjid in Chapai Nawabganj District on the Bangladesh side.

== Geography ==
Cities, towns and locations in the southern portion of Malda district (including Kaliachak I, Kaliachak II, Kaliachak III, Manikchak and English Bazar CD blocks)
M: municipal town, CT: census town, R: rural/ urban centre, F: Facility, H: historical centre
Owing to space constraints in the small map, the actual locations in a larger map may vary slightly

=== Location ===
Mahadipur is located at 24.8566°N 88.1248°E, near the historical ruins of Gauḍa.

165.5 km of the India-Bangladesh border is in Malda district. As of 2017, about half of the 4,096 km of the border India shares with Bangladesh has been fenced.

=== Border checkpoint and land port ===
Mahadipur is a land port and border checkpoint, on the Bangladesh-India border, being developed (in 2018) as an integrated checkpost (ICP) for the smooth movement of goods and people. The land port and checkpoint at Sonamosjid in Shibganj Upazila of Chapai Nawabganj District is on the Bangladesh side of the border.

There is a customs office for export/import at Mahadipur.

Mahadipur land port, located 370 km from Kolkata, is a distant second to the largest land port at Petrapole, 100 km from Kolkata. Mahadipur handles around 500 trucks per day and around Rs. 1,500 crore worth of exports pass through annually.

Intergovernmental Agreement on Dry Ports is a 2013 United Nations treaty designed to promote the cooperation of the development of dry ports in the Asia-Pacific region.

=== Area overview ===
The area shown in the adjoining map is the physiographic sub-region known as the diara. It "is a relatively well drained flat land formed by the fluvial deposition of newer alluvium." The most note-worthy feature is the Farakka Barrage across the Ganges. The area is a part of the Malda Sadar subdivision, which is an overwhelmingly rural region, but the area shown in the map has pockets of urbanization with 17 census towns, concentrated mostly in the Kaliachak I CD block. The bank of the Ganges between Bhutni and Panchanandapur (both the places are marked on the map), is the area worst hit by left bank erosion, a major problem in the Malda area. The ruins of Gauda, capital of several empires, is located in this area.

== Demographics ==
As per the 2011 Census of India, Mahadipur had a total population of 8,638, of which 4,435 (51%) were males and 4,203 (49%) were females. Population below 6 years was 1,206. The total number of literates in Mahadipur was 5,364 (72.17% of the population over 6 years).

== Healthcare ==
Milki Rural Hospital at Milki (with 30 beds) is the main medical facility in English Bazar CD Block. There are primary health centres at KG Chandipur (Chandipur PHC) (with 10 beds) and Mahadipur (with 10 beds).

== Transport ==
Mahadipur is on Gour Road that starts from National Highway 12 (old number NH 34) and after the border crossing leads on towards Rajshahi in Bangladesh.
