= Jotbani Union =

Jotbani Union জোতবানী ইউনিয়ন
- Country: Bangladesh

Area
  - Total: 36.60 km^{2} (14.13 sq mi)

Population (2011 census)
  - Total: 22,462
  - Density: 610/km^{2} (1,600/sq mi)
- Website: jatbaniup.dinajpur.gov.bd

Jotbani Union (Bengali: জোতবানী ইউনিয়ন) is one of the seven union parishads under Birampur Upazila of Dinajpur District in the Rangpur Division of northwestern Bangladesh. It has an area of 36.60 km^{2} . It has 4,500 households. The union porishod office of Jotbani Union is only one hours road journey away from Birampur Upazila.

== Demographics ==
As of the 2011 Bangladesh census, Birampur has a population of 22462. Males constitute 11,387 of the population, and females 11,075. Jotbani has an average literacy rate of 70%.There are also non-profit organizations named bondhu Foundation.

== Economy ==
The economy of Jotbani Union mainly depends upon agriculture based production. A huge percentage of people from Jotbani Union depends upon agri based products. The main industry also includes rice processing mills. Crops and grown in the district include rice, wheat, maize, potato, brinjal and tomato.
