= Immigration to India =

There are 4.9 million foreign-born residents in the Republic of India, accounting for 0.4% of its population. 98% of immigrants to India came from a previous residence elsewhere in Asia.

== History ==
=== Ancient era ===
The Indian subcontinent has a long history of accepting refugees. Its Jewish community dates back to the fall of Jerusalem in the first century AD, and its Zoroastrianism-adhering Parsis immigrated to escape the 7th-century Muslim conquest of Persia.

=== Medieval era ===
Persians, Turks, and Central Asians migrated to the subcontinent during the Indo-Muslim period. They participated in the imperial bureaucracy, brought Muslim influences such as Sufism, and helped to form the Indo-Persian culture.

=== Colonial era ===
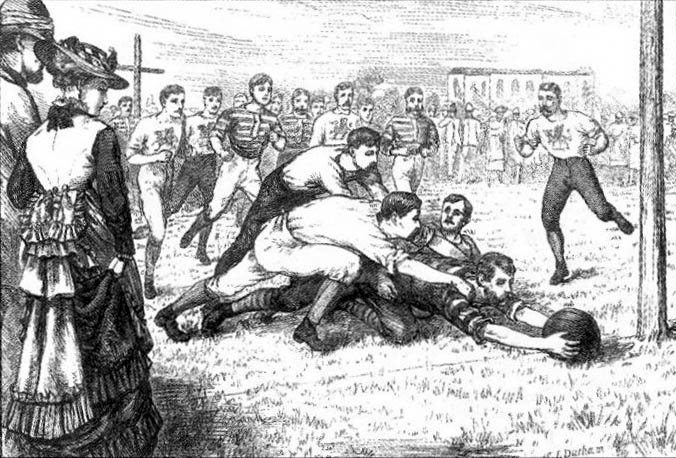
An 1875 painting of rugby being played by Europeans in Calcutta (today Kolkata). Western sports were first adopted in the Indian subcontinent during British rule.

The British colonial presence in India varied in characteristics over time; British people generally stayed in the colony on a temporary basis, and were sometimes aiming to avoid local cultural habits and contact. Children would often grow up in India, be sent to Britain to receive a "proper" education, and then return to India as adults. With the mortality rate for foreigners being high at the time due to disease, playing British sports was one way that the British could maintain their health and spirits; in the words of a contemporary writer, it was best for Englishmen to "defend themselves from the magic of the land by sports, games, clubs."

=== Contemporary era ===
The modern dynamics of migration to the new Republic of India are often specific to its neighbourhood; for example, 97% of immigrants from Bangladesh live in the Bangladesh-bordering regions of the Indian Republic (East India and Northeast India). Medical tourism has also been a factor in some migration decisions.

Return migration of the Indian diaspora is another factor; for example, because of the COVID-19 pandemic's economic disruption, some Indian labour migrants in the Arab Gulf countries were forced to come to India, generally via the Vande Bharat Mission. (See also: Deportation of Indian nationals under Donald Trump)

== Illegal immigration ==
An illegal immigrant in India is a foreigner who has entered the Republic of India either without valid documents or who initially had a valid document, but has overstayed beyond the permitted time, as per the general provisions of the Citizenship Act as amended in 2003. Such persons are not eligible for citizenship by registration or naturalisation. They are also liable to be imprisoned for 2–8 years and fined.

Refugees in India are different from the illegal immigrant in India. An exception was made in 2015 for minority communities of Bangladesh, Pakistan and Afghanistan who were compelled to seek shelter in India due to religious persecution or fear of religious persecution. They are not classified as illegal migrants and remain eligible for citizenship, as they are legally considered refugees in India.

The Indian Census of 2001 gives information about migrants, but not exclusively illegal immigrants. As per the 2001 Census, Bangladeshis form the largest group of migrants in India, followed by Pakistanis.

== See also ==
- Bureau of Immigration (India)
- Illegal immigration to India
- Refugees in India
- Protected and restricted areas of India
- 2026 Meghalaya border fencing protests
