= Tamabil, Sylhet =

Tourist spot in Sylhet district

Coordinates: 25°10′19.32″N 92°5′25.53″E

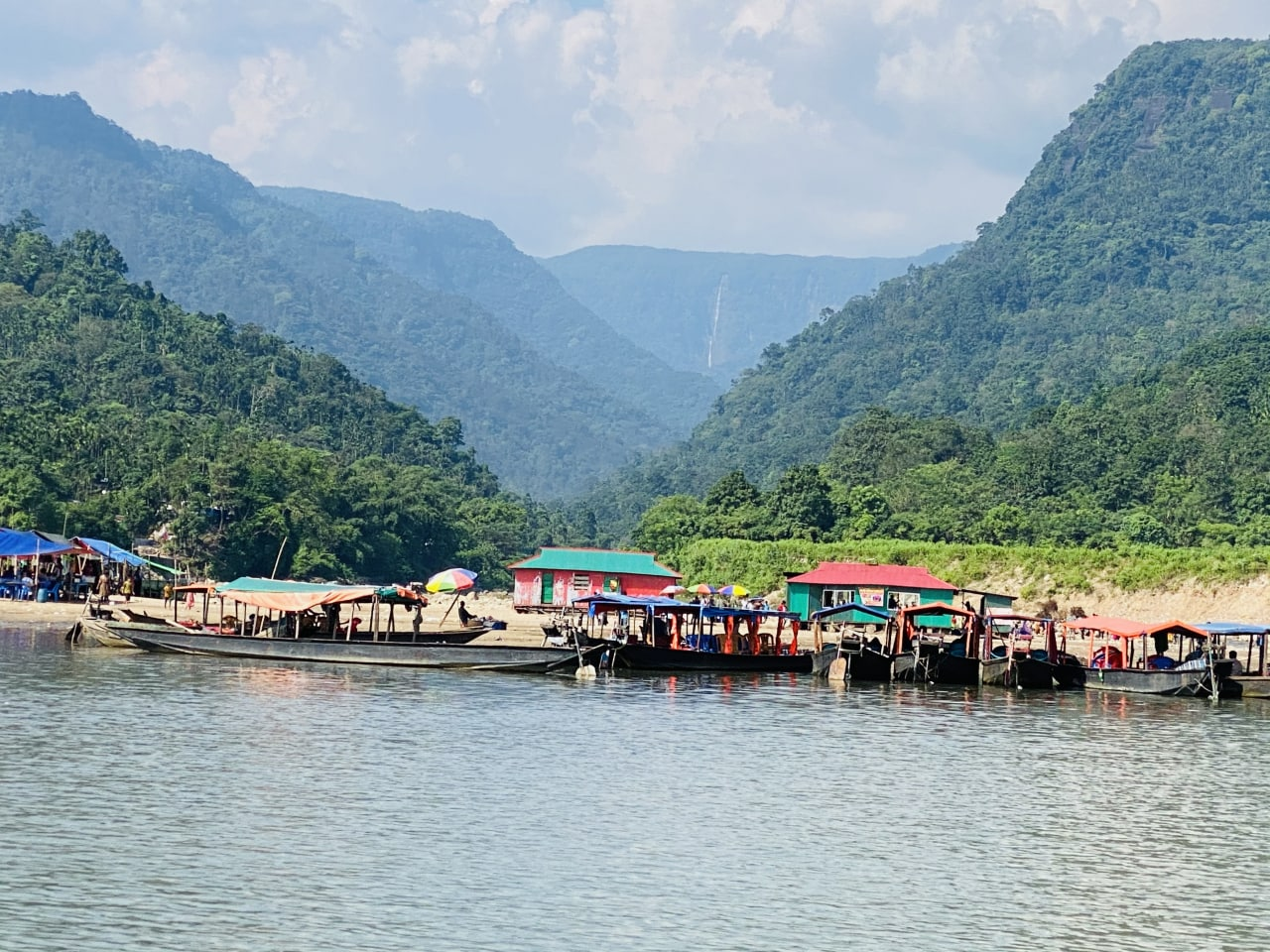
Tamabil area

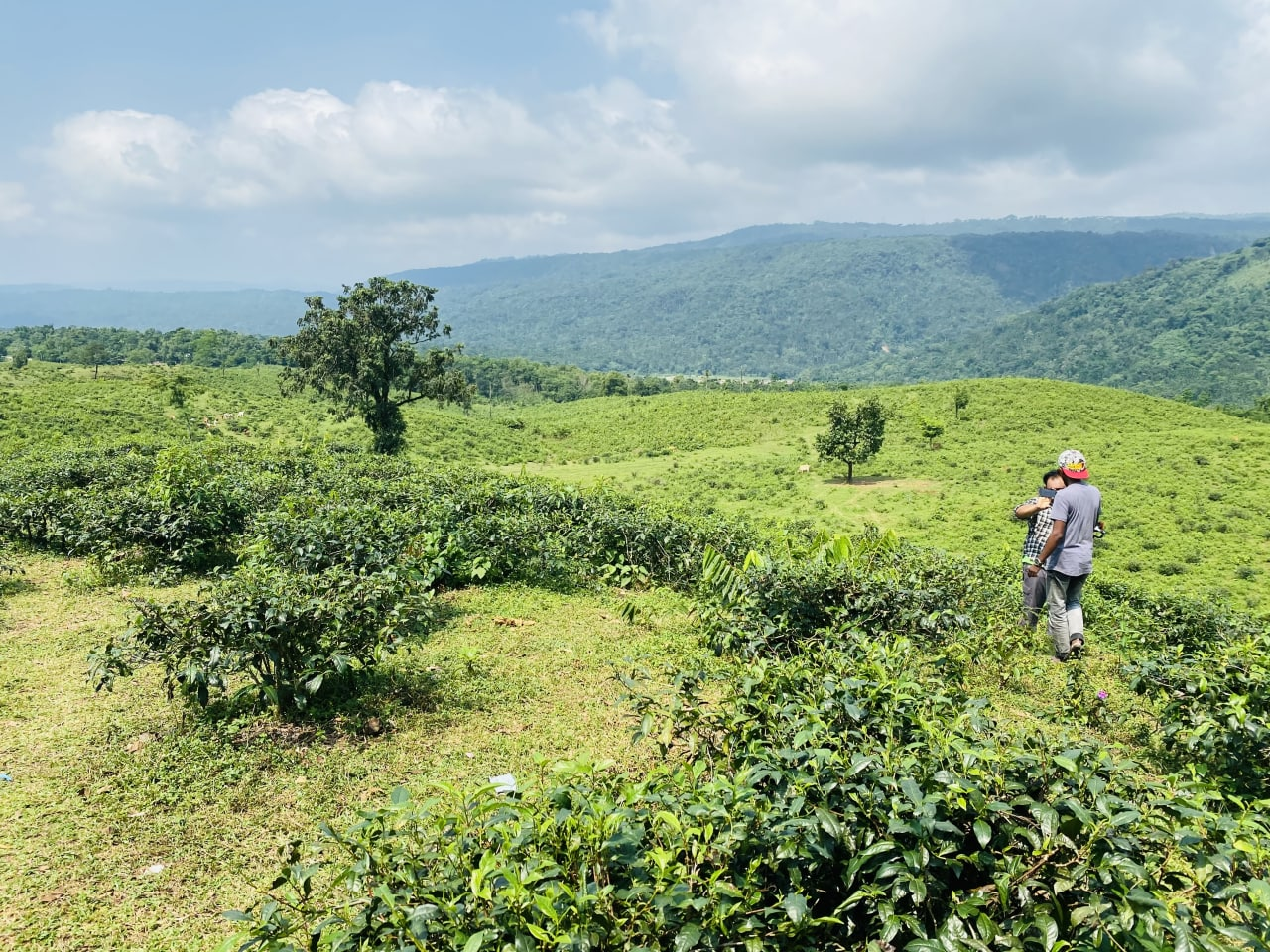
Tamabil hill area

Tamabil (Bengali: তামাবিল) is a hilly region in Sylhet on the border between Bangladesh and the Indian state of Meghalaya about 5 km from Jaflong.

It stands on the Sylhet-Shillong Road some 55 kilometres (34 mi) from Sylhet town in Bangladesh. It is well known for the Bangladesh Last House, which is located on the Bangladesh–India border, and the Jaiñtia Hill Resort.

== Gallery ==
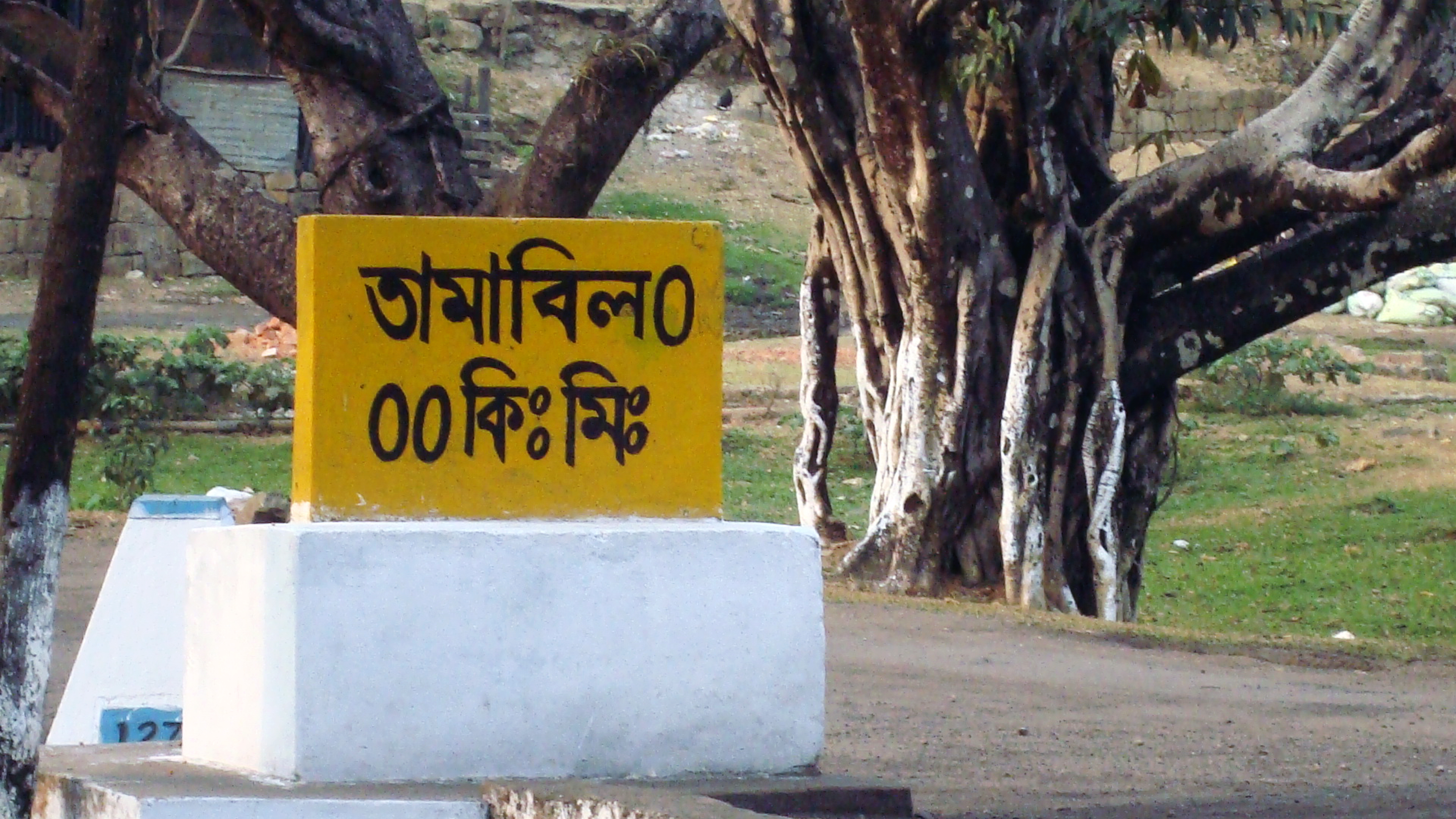
Tamabil border

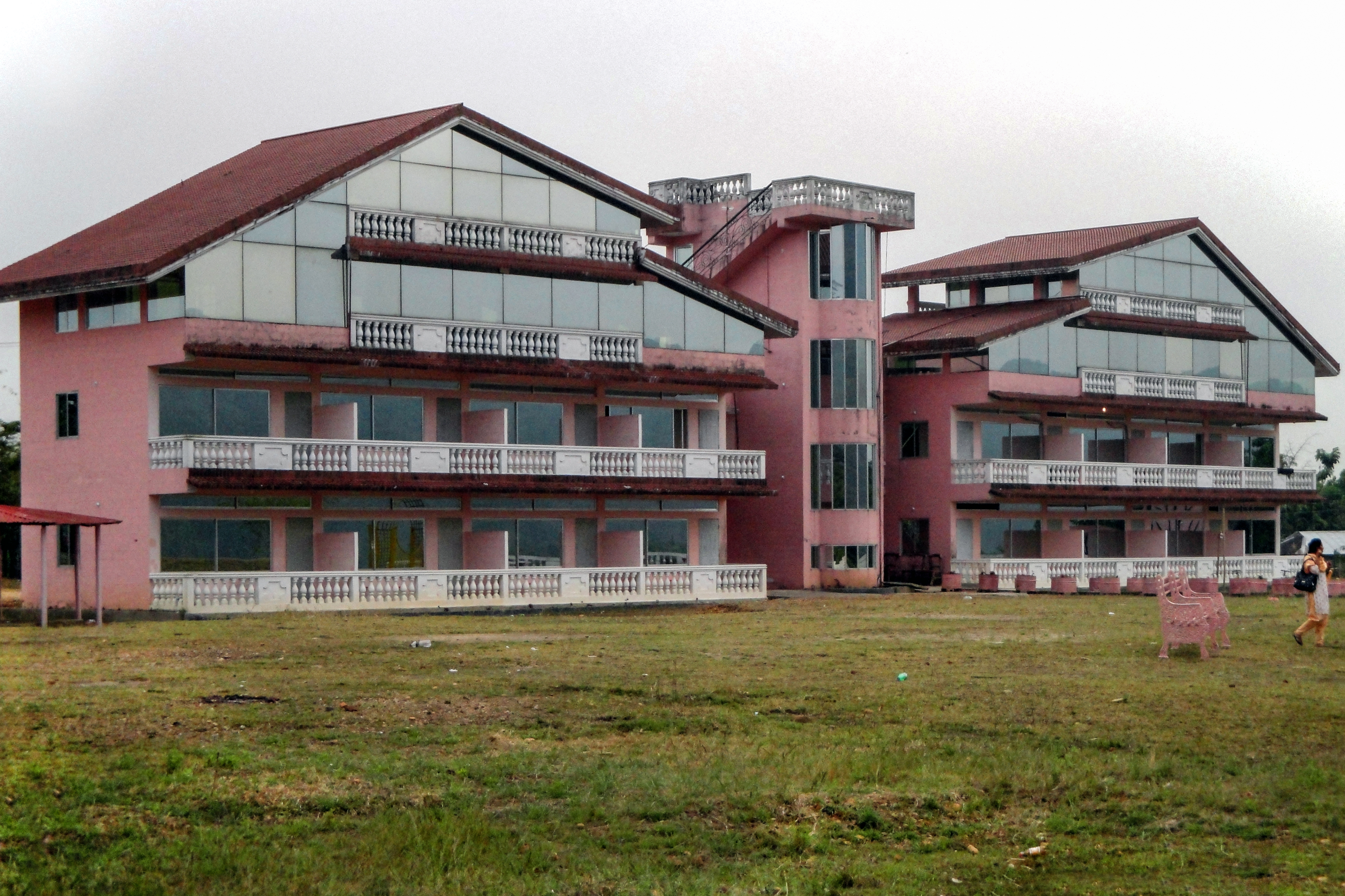
Jointa Hill Resort

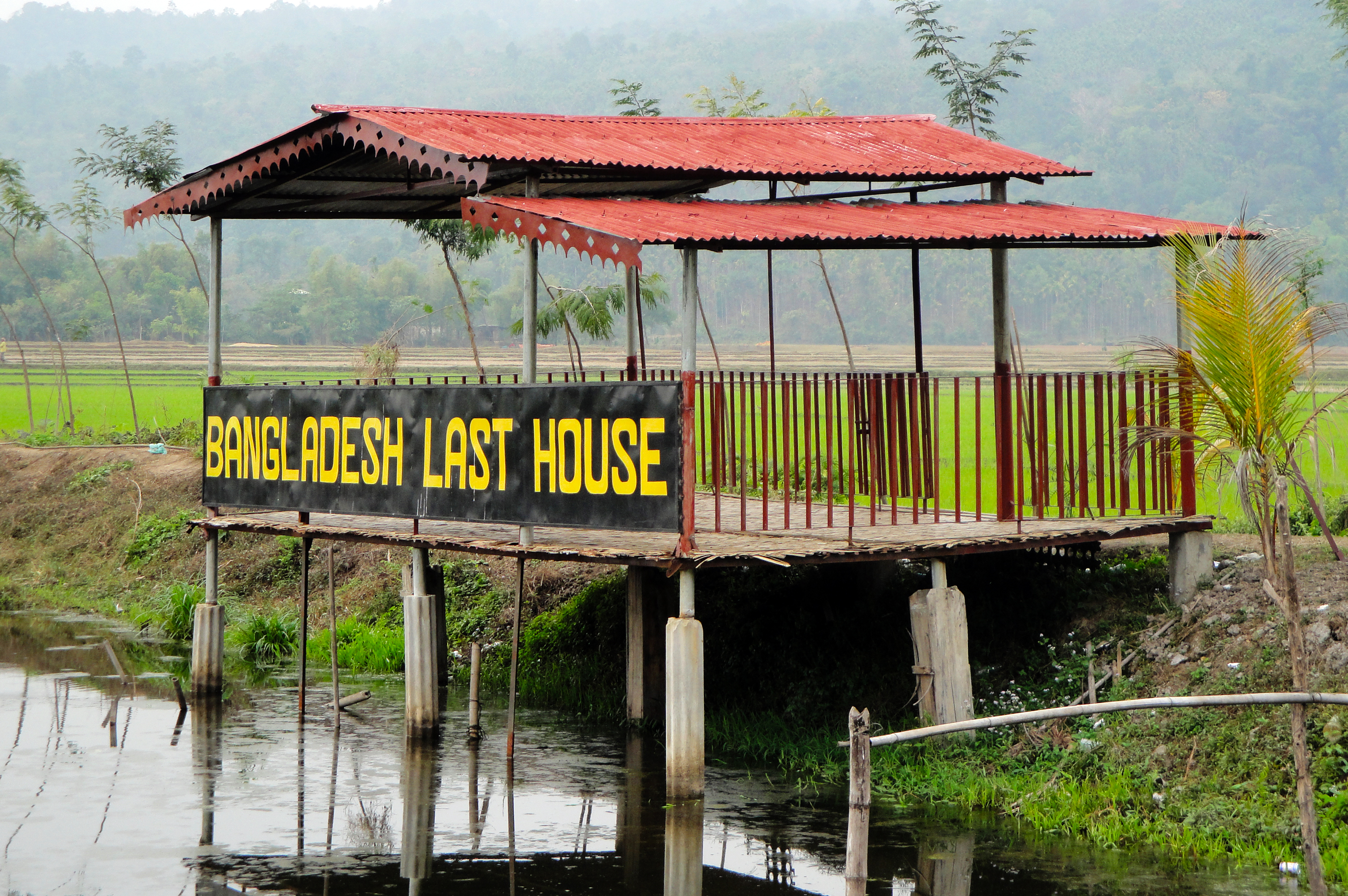
Bangladesh Last House

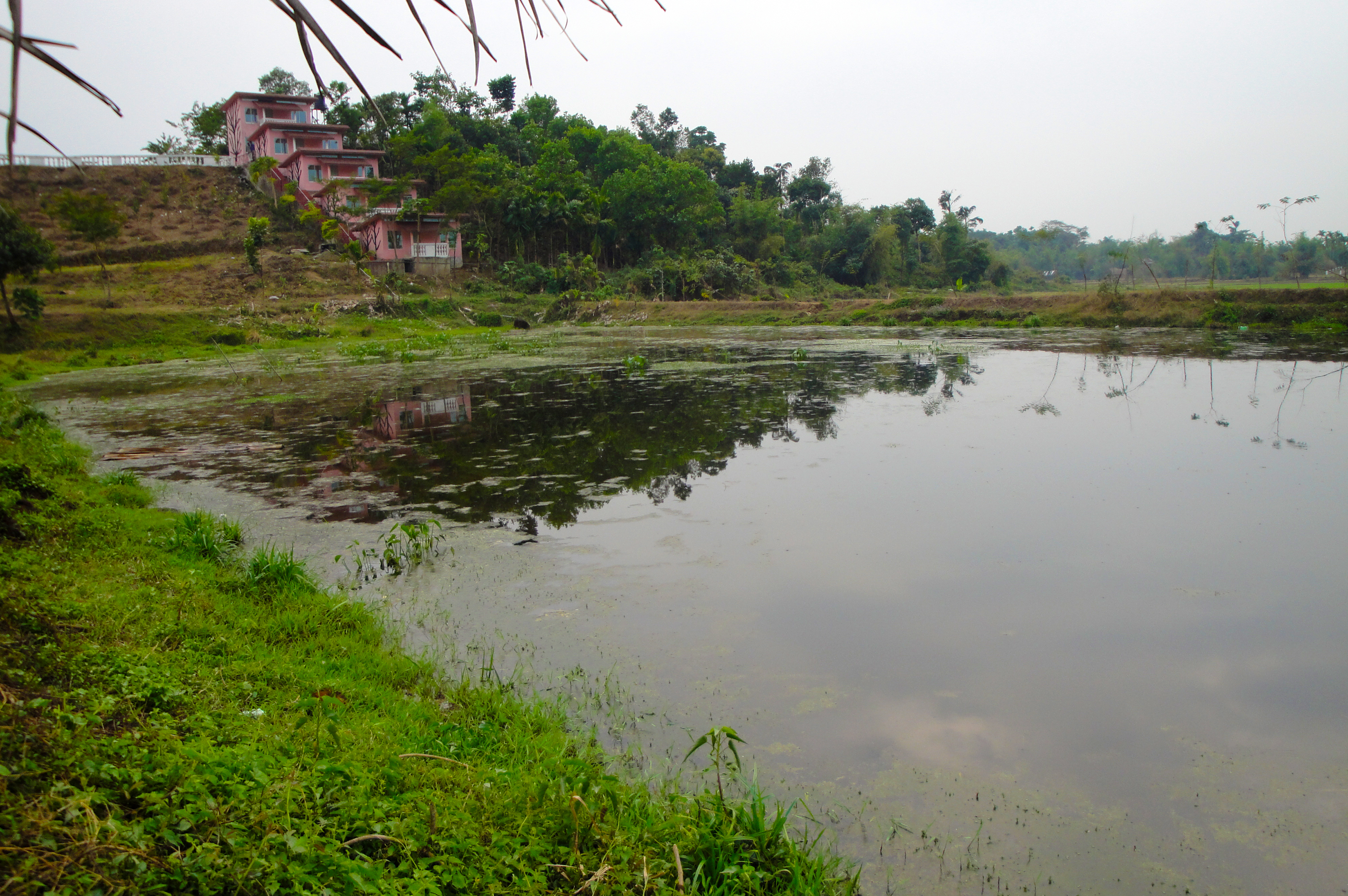
Bangladesh Last House, another view
