= Hakimpur Upazila =

Hakimpur হাকিমপুর
- Upazila
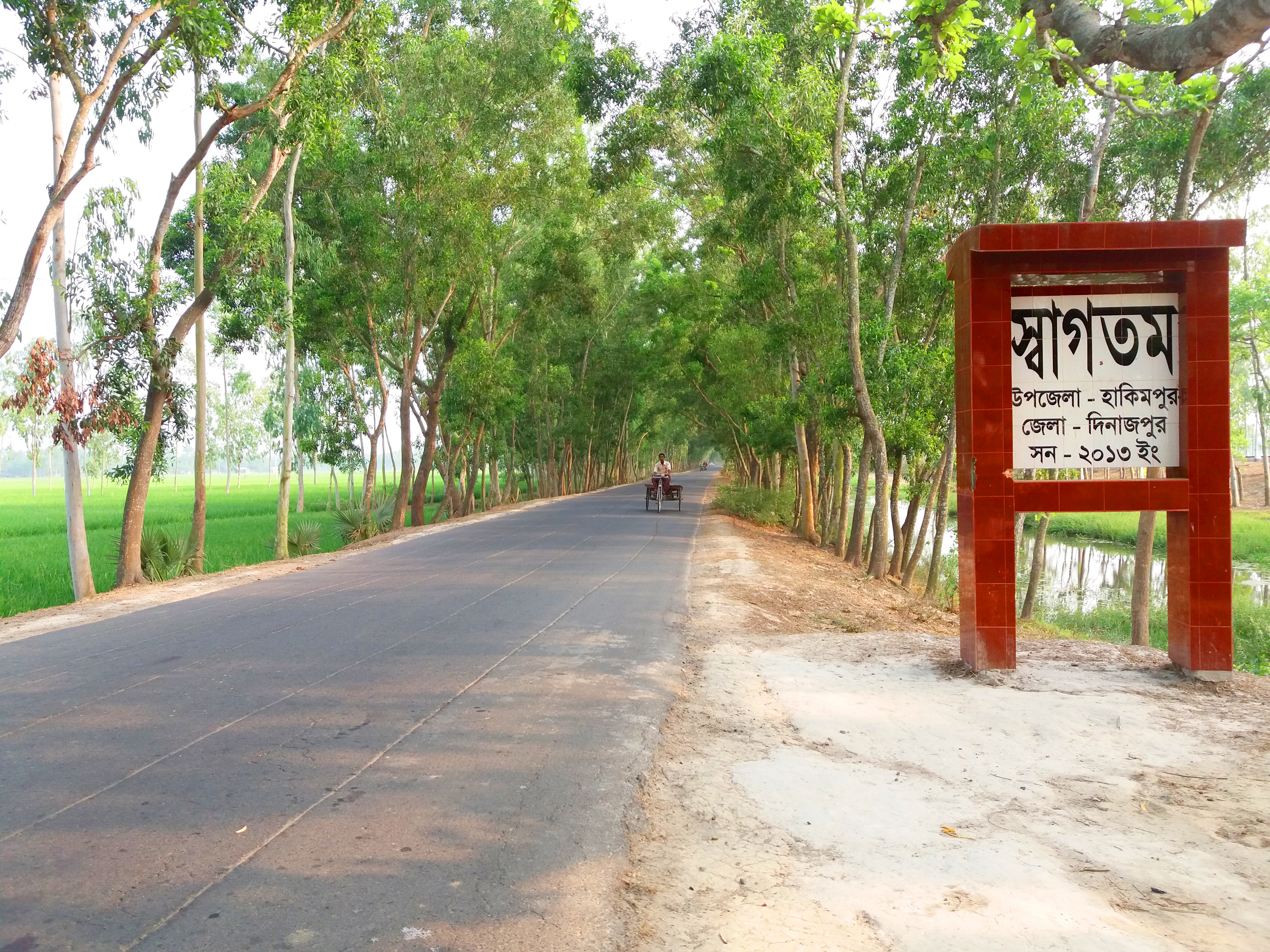
- Hakimpur welcome gate

- Coordinates: 25°17′N 89°1′E
- Country: Bangladesh
- Division: Rangpur
- District: Dinajpur

Area
  - Total: 99.92 km^{2} (38.58 sq mi)

Population (2022)
  - Total: 95,972
  - Density: 960.5/km^{2} (2,488/sq mi)
- Time zone: UTC+6 (BST)
- Postal code: 5270
- Area code: 0531
- Website: Official Map of Hakimpur

Hakimpur Upazila mauza geocode map

Hakimpur (Bengali: হাকিমপুর) is an upazila of Dinajpur District in the Division of Rangpur, Bangladesh.

== Geography ==
Hakimpur Upazila is located at 25.2833°N 89.0167°E. It has 22,895 households and total area 99.92 km^{2}.

Hakimpur Upazila is bounded by Nawabganj and Birampur Upazilas on the north, Nawabganj and Ghoraghat Upazila on the east, Panchbibi Upazila in Joypurhat District on the south and Hili CD Block in Dakshin Dinajpur district, West Bengal, India, and Birampur Upazila on the west.

The second-largest land port of Bangladesh, Hili Land Port, is situated here.

== Demographics ==
Religions in Hakimpur Upazila (2022)
Religion	Percent
Islam	91.89%
Hinduism	6.35%
Christianity	1.36%
Other or not stated	0.40%

According to the 2022 Bangladeshi census, Hakimpur Upazila had 25,248 households and a population of 95,972. 8.42% of the population were under 5 years of age. Hakimpur had a literacy rate (age 7 and over) of 77.25%: 80.86% for males and 73.61% for females, and a sex ratio of 101.24 males for every 100 females. 36,702 (38.24%) lived in urban areas. Ethnic population is 1913 (1.99%), of which Oraon were 1161.

Population of upazila by ethnicity (2022)
1. Bengali (98.0%)
2. Oraon (1.21%)
3. Others (0.78%)

According to the 2011 Census of Bangladesh, Hakimpur Upazila had 22,895 households and a population of 92,599. 19,296 (20.84%) were under 10 years of age. Hakimpur had a literacy rate (age 7 and over) of 54.72%, compared to the national average of 51.8%, and a sex ratio of 963 females per 1000 males. 28,411 (30.68%) lived in urban areas. Ethnic population was 3,059 (3.30%), of which Oraon were 1,868 and Santal 876.

As of the 1991 Bangladesh census, Hakimpur has a population of 66875. Males constitute 51.22% of the population, and females 48.78%. This Upazila's eighteen up population is 35649. Hakimpur has an average literacy rate of 30.1% (7+ years), better than the national average of 32.4%..

== Administration ==
UNO: Ashok Bikram Chakma.

Hakimpur Thana was formed in 1950 and it was turned into an upazila in 1984.

Hakimpur Upazila is divided into Hakimpur Municipality and three union parishads: Alihat, Boalder, and Khattamadobpara. The union parishads are subdivided into 69 mauzas and 83 villages.

Hakimpur Municipality is subdivided into 9 wards and 17 mahallas.

=== Pouroshova ===
- Hakimpur

=== Unions ===
- Alihat
- Khottamadabpara
- Boyaldar

== See also ==
- Upazilas of Bangladesh
- Districts of Bangladesh
- Divisions of Bangladesh
- Dinajpur District, Bangladesh
- Hili Railway Station
