= Khanpur Union =

Khanpur Union may refer to:

- Khanpur Union, Manirampur, a union in Manirampur Upazila
- Khanpur Union, Bagerhat Sadar, a union in Bagherhat Sadar Upazila
