= Bangladesh Last House =

- বাংলাদেশ শেষ বাড়ি
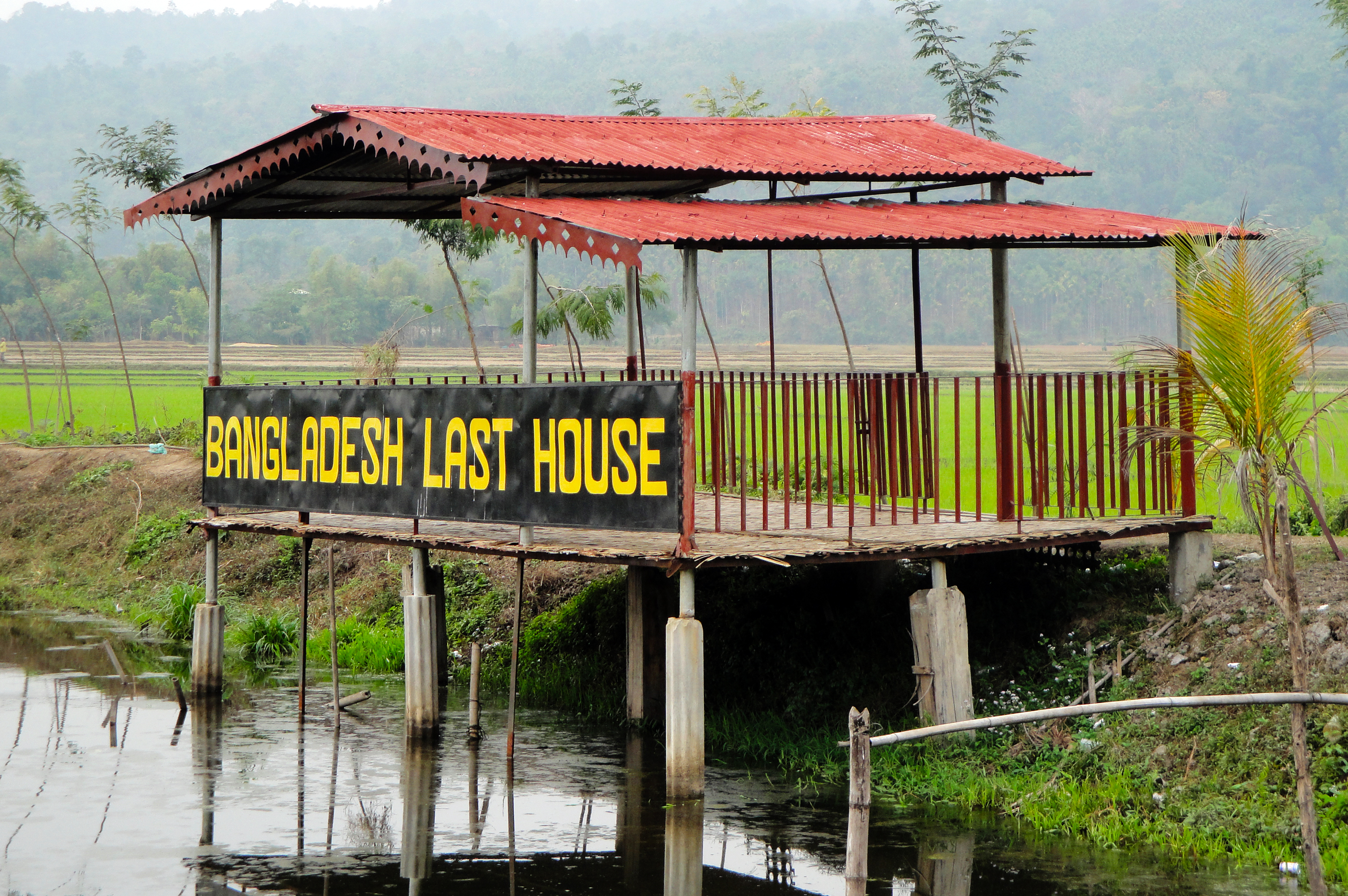
- The Last House
- Interactive map of Bangladesh Last House
- Location: Tamabil, Gowainghat, Sylhet, Bangladesh
- Coordinates: 25°10′53″N 92°03′40″E
- Type: Hut
- Material: Tin

Bangladesh Last House is the last place of Bangladesh before the Bangladesh–India border at Jaintia Hill Resort, Tamabil, Sylhet District in Bangladesh. It has a view of two waterfalls with a mountain at Jaintia Hill Resort. It is a popular destination for tourism in Bangladesh, attracting thousands of visitors.

== Gallery ==
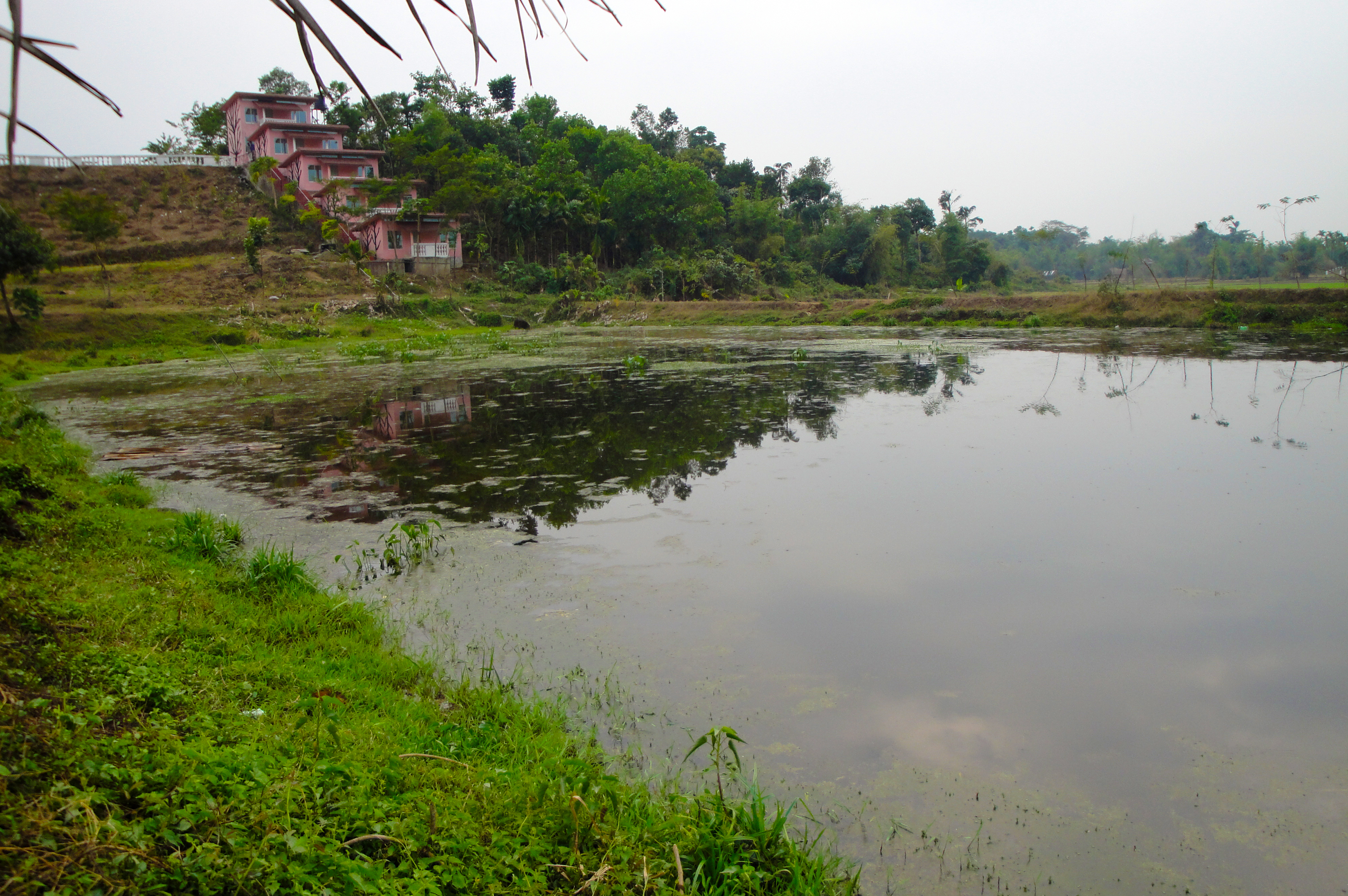
View from Bangladesh Last House

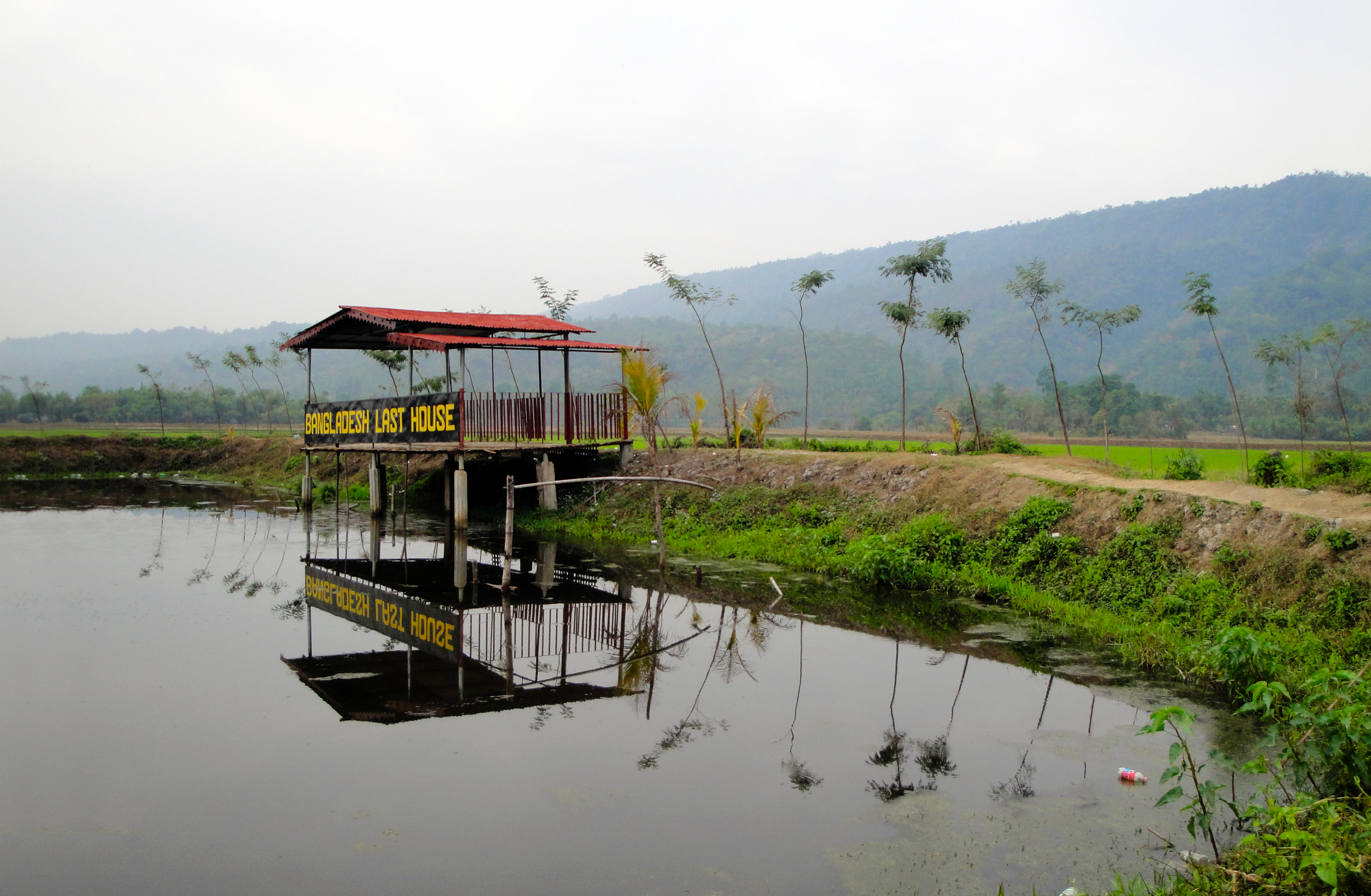
View of Bangladesh Last House

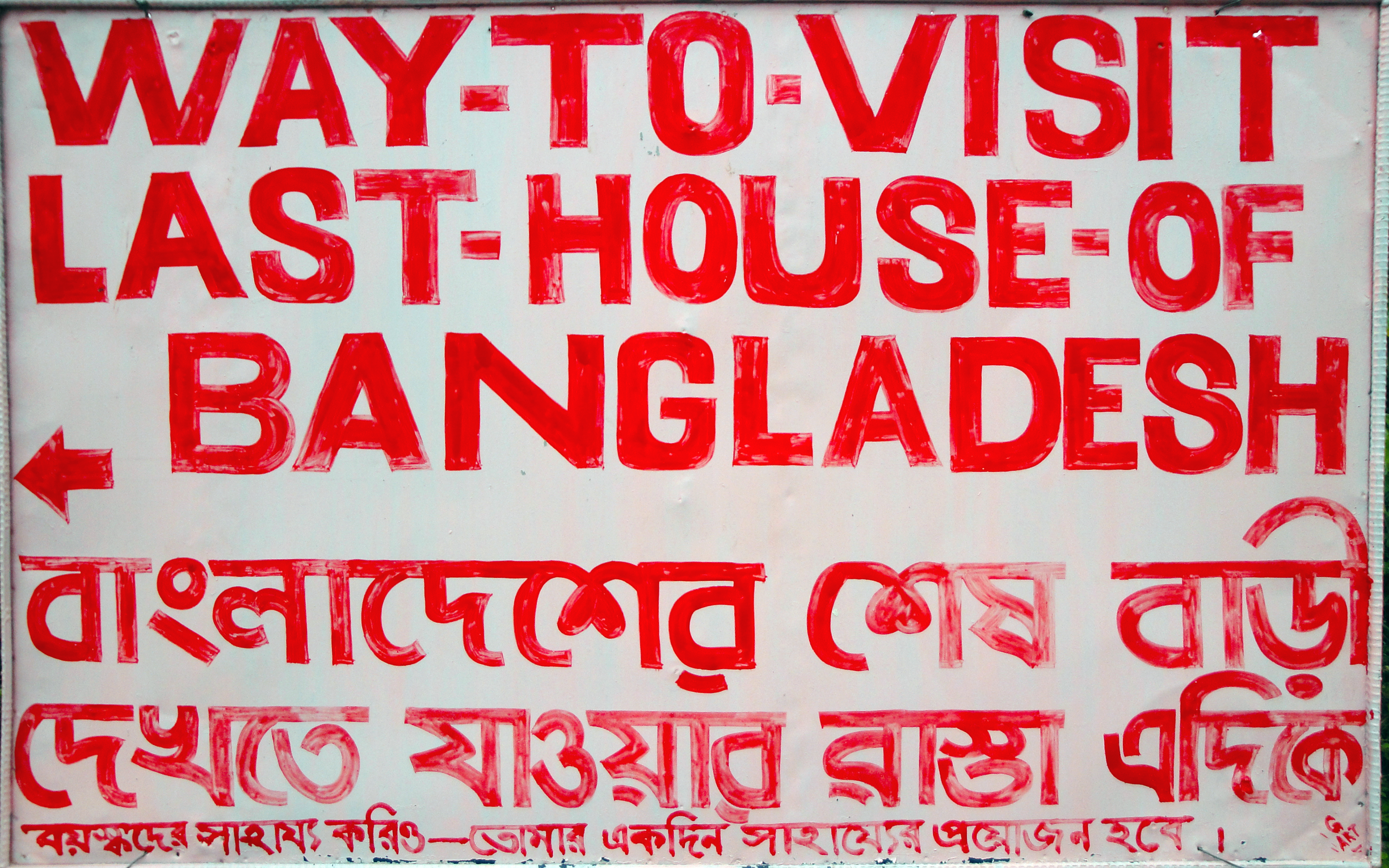
Directorial sign
