= Bangladesh–India border =

International border between India and Bangladesh

Coordinates: 26°15′43″N 88°45′06″E

India-Bangladesh–border
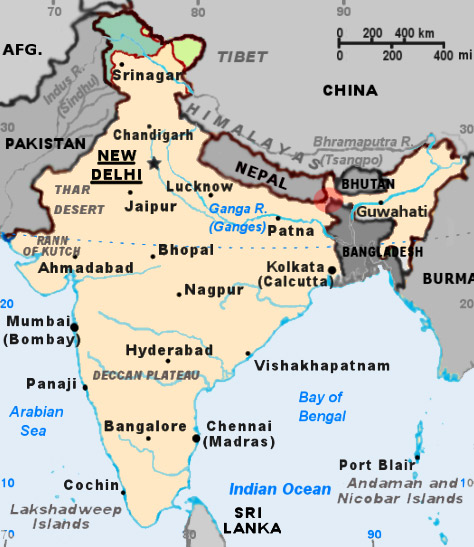
- The border has a narrow strip of Indian territory called the Siliguri Corridor (highlighted in red)

Characteristics
- Entities: Bangladesh; India
- Length: 4,096 km (2,545 mi)

History
- Established: 17 August 1947; Creation of the Radcliffe Line by Sir Cyril Radcliffe due to the Partition of British India
- Current shape: 7 May 2015; Exchange of enclaves, simplification of land boundaries

The Bangladesh–India border, known locally as the Radcliffe line, separates six Bangladeshi divisions and five Indian states. At 4,096 kilometres (2,545 mi), it is the sixth-longest land border in the world, (Note: The five longer land borders are: between Canada and the United States; between Russia and Kazakhstan; between Argentina and Chile; between China and Mongolia, and; the border between China and Russia.) including 262 km (163 mi) in Assam, 856 km (532 mi) in Tripura, 318 km (198 mi) in Mizoram, 443 km (275 mi) in Meghalaya and 2,217 km (1,378 mi) in West Bengal. The Bangladeshi divisions of Mymensingh, Khulna, Rajshahi, Rangpur, Sylhet, and Chittagong are situated along the border. A number of pillars mark the border between the two states. Small demarcated portions of the border are fenced on both sides.

== History ==
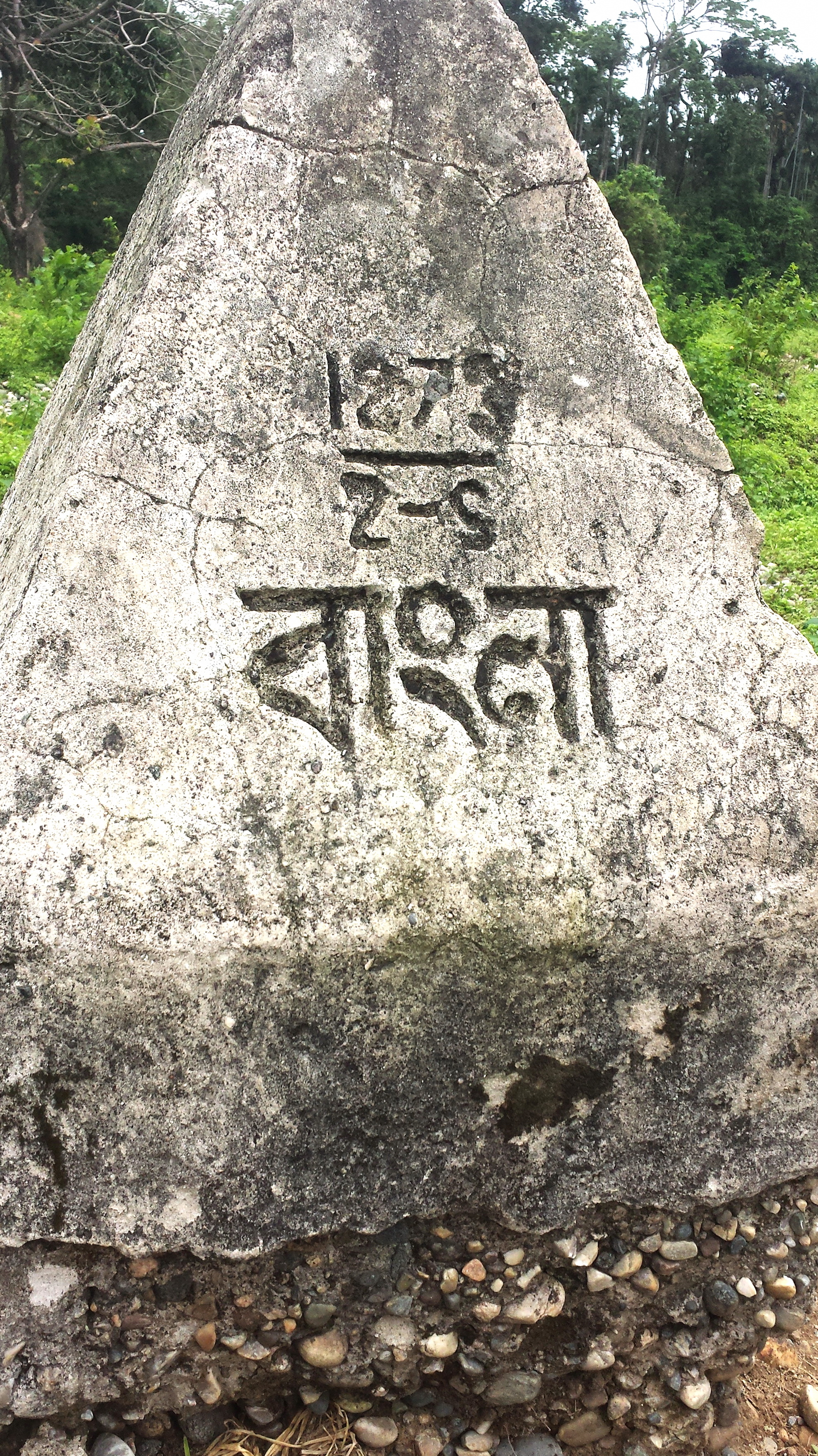
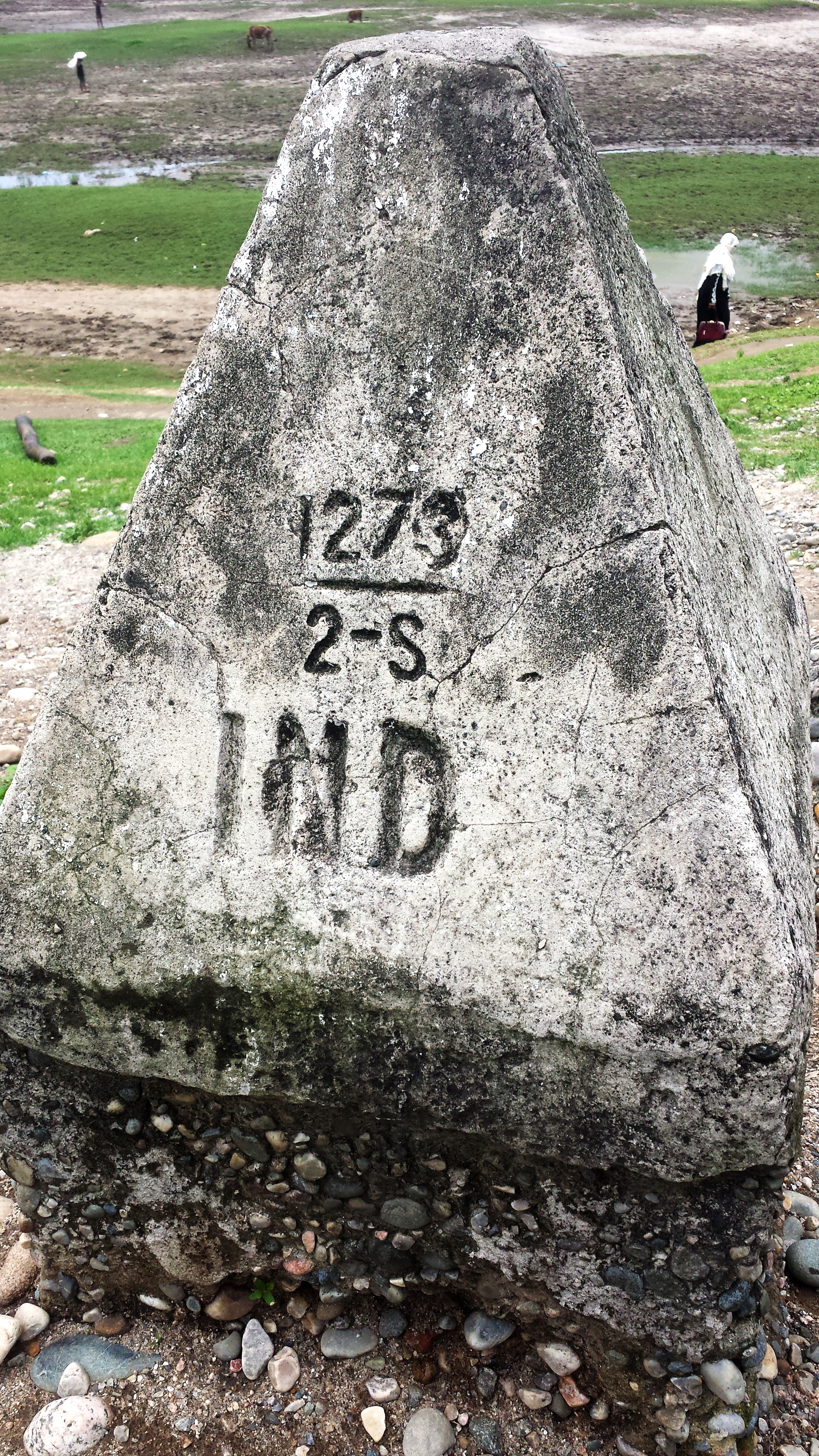
Post number 1273 of Bangladesh–India border

The Radcliffe Line was published on 17 August 1947 as a boundary demarcation line between the dominions of India and Pakistan upon the partition of India. It was named after its architect, Sir Cyril Radcliffe, who, as chairman of the Border Commissions, was charged with dividing 450,000 square kilometres (175,000 sq mi) of territory with 88 million people based on religious lines. This involved the partition of the Bengal region, which resulted in transferring East Bengal to Pakistan, which was later liberated in 1971, thereby Bangladesh continuing to share the same line as the border with the Indian Republic.

== Issues ==
=== 1970s border skirmishes ===
Several skirmishes occurred along the border during the 1970s, years after the victory of the Battles of Belonia Bulge by the Mukti Bahini and allied Indian troops. The Belonia issue was almost settled in 1974 when Indira Gandhi and Sheikh Mujibur Rahman agreed to the general principle of watershed. It was decided that in all cases of river line boundaries the midstream would be regarded as the border. And that both sides would take steps to ensure that the rivers did not change their course but unfortunately, it was not settled.

The joint boundaries commission was to meet in the first week of November to finalise the Belonia border within the framework of the Indira-Mujib agreement. Officials of the two countries held a flag meeting. However, on 15 August 1975, Sheikh Mujibur Rahman and his family was killed after Mujib established a one-party system, and Ziaur Rahman became the President of Bangladesh in 1977, Indira Gandhi also lost the 1977 Indian general election in the same year. In October 1979, Bangladesh said, it should be regarded as no-man's-land and farmers on the Indian side should be refrained from harvesting in no-man's-land. The Indian side disagreed and Indian peasants began harvesting the paddy they had sown. Bangladesh Rifles and the Border Security Force both exchanged fire in the beginning days of November thus starting intense gun battles between the two sides.

Bangladesh Rifles and Indian Border Security Forces exchanged fire near the Comilla-Tripura border throughout the entire month of November to December 1979. The shooting appeared to have become a habit with the soldiers on both sides. A joint survey team of India and Bangladesh visited the area and watched bullets flying across the disputed land for 90 minutes. No fatalities or injuries were reported.

After the three-day talks, the two delegations issued a brief joint statement in which, both sides agreed to exercise maximum restraint and avoided provocation to ensure the return of normalcy in the Muhurichar area of the Belonia sector on the Tripura-Comilla border. This merely meant that the two sides would not resort to exchange of firing on the disputed 44-acre stretch of land.

Exchange of firing ended, but the talks had later failed.

=== Skirmishes after 1979 incident ===
Skirmishes in Belonia also occurred in 1985, where heavy mortars were used in the intense clash. Skirmishes near and in Belonia also occurred in 1999, where six civilians including one BSF Jawan were injured. The 67.31-acre land at Muhurichar has remained a disputed area since 1974 with both India and Bangladesh claiming the cultivable tract as their own territory. Of it, 44.87 acre falls in the Indian territory, while the rest is in Bangladesh's control.

In total, there were eight skirmishes from 1979 to 1999 in Muhuri Char. BGB and BSF clashed for a total of 58 days in 20 years.

=== Smuggling ===
The border is used as a route for smuggling livestock, food items, medicines, and drugs from India to Bangladesh. Moreover, illegal immigrants from Bangladesh cross the border to India. Because of a large number of illegal immigrants crossing from Bangladesh into India, a controversial shoot-on-sight policy has been enforced by the Indian border patrols. This policy was initiated with reports of violence between the illegal migrants and Indian soldiers. The border has also witnessed occasional skirmishes between the Indian Border Security Force (BSF) and the Border Guards Bangladesh (BGB), most notably in 2001.

=== Fence construction ===
In July 2009, Channel 4 News reported that hundreds of Indians and Bangladeshis were killed by the BSF along the Indo-Bangladeshi border fence during its construction. The BSF state that the fence's main purpose is to check illegal immigration and to prevent cross-border terrorism. In 2010, Human Rights Watch (HRW) issued an 81-page report which documented a number abuses committed by the BSF. The report was compiled from the interviews of abuse victims, witnesses, members of the BSF, and its Bangladeshi counterpart, the BGB. The report stated that over 900 Bangladeshi citizens were killed during the first decade of the 21st century, many of whom crossed the border for cattle rustling or other smuggling activities. However, the report also noted that some were killed due to "indiscriminate firing from across the border". The HRW called for a joint independent investigation to be conducted by both governments.

=== Alleged BSF incursions ===
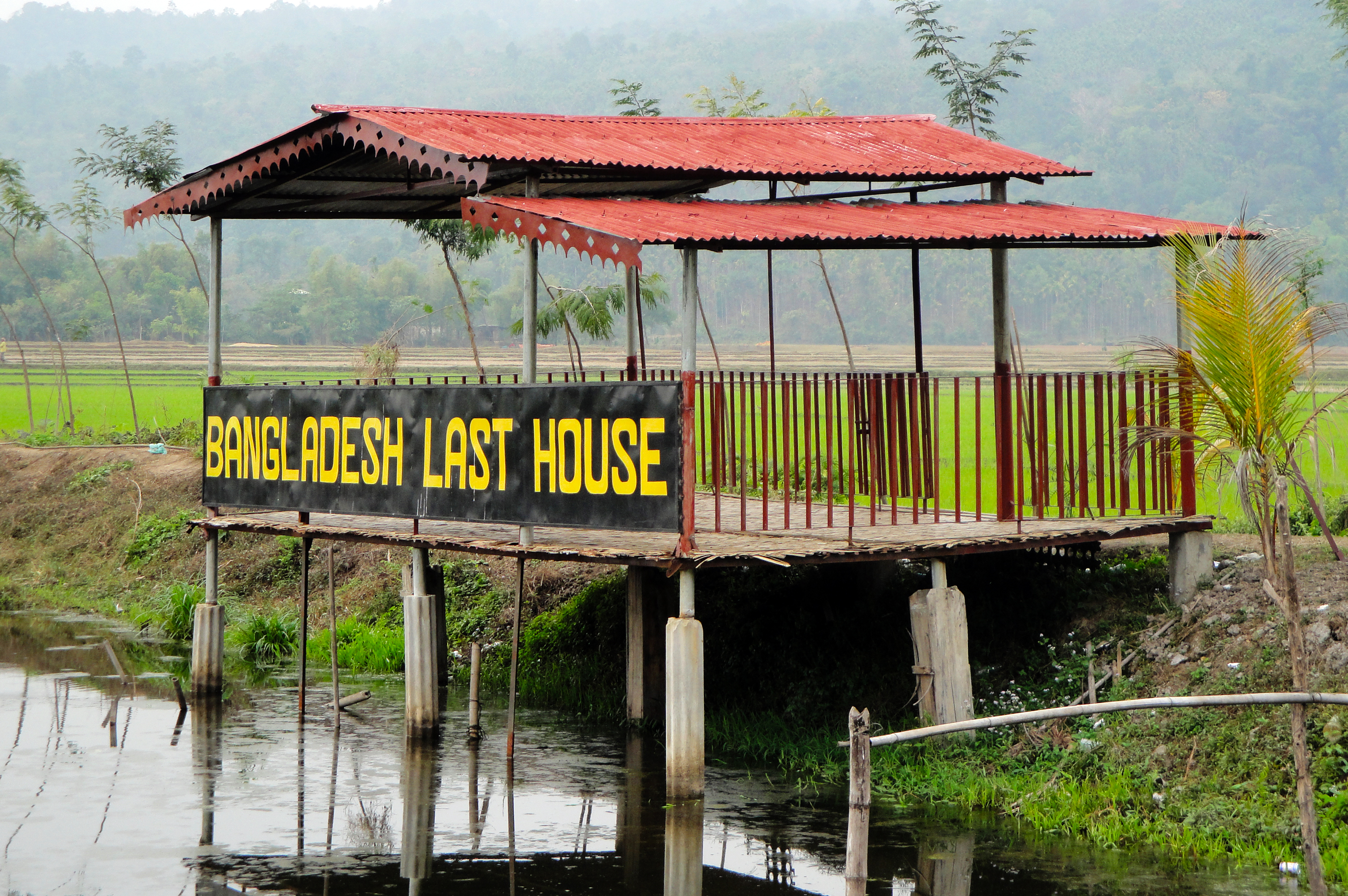
Bangladesh Last House, on the Bangladesh–India border at Jointa Hill Resort, Tamabil, Sylhet

The Bangladeshi government has often accused the BSF of incursions into Bangladeshi territory, and indiscriminate shooting of civilians along the India–Bangladesh border. In a news conference in August 2008, Indian BSF officials said that 59 people (34 Bangladeshis, 21 Indians, 4 unidentified) had been killed while crossing the border in the previous six months. Bangladeshi media accused the BSF of abducting 5 Bangladeshi children, aged between 8 and 15, from the Haripur Upazila in Thakurgaon District of Bangladesh, in 2010. The children were setting fishing nets near the border. In 2010, Human Rights Watch accused the Border Security Force of the indiscriminate killings. On 7 January 2011, 15-year-old Felani Khatun was shot while trying to cross the border fence for several hours. A BSF constable was tried by a BSF court and acquitted, and India's National Human Rights Commission later recommended compensation for her family.

In 2019, Bangladesh border guards shot at BSF personnel. They claimed self defence. One BSF officer was killed.

== Border length by Indian states ==
The breakdown of the length of land border by Indian states is as follows, clockwise:

- Total 4096 km
  - West Bengal 2217 km
  - Assam 262 km
  - Meghalaya 443 km
  - Tripura 856 km
  - Mizoram 318 km

== Enclaves ==
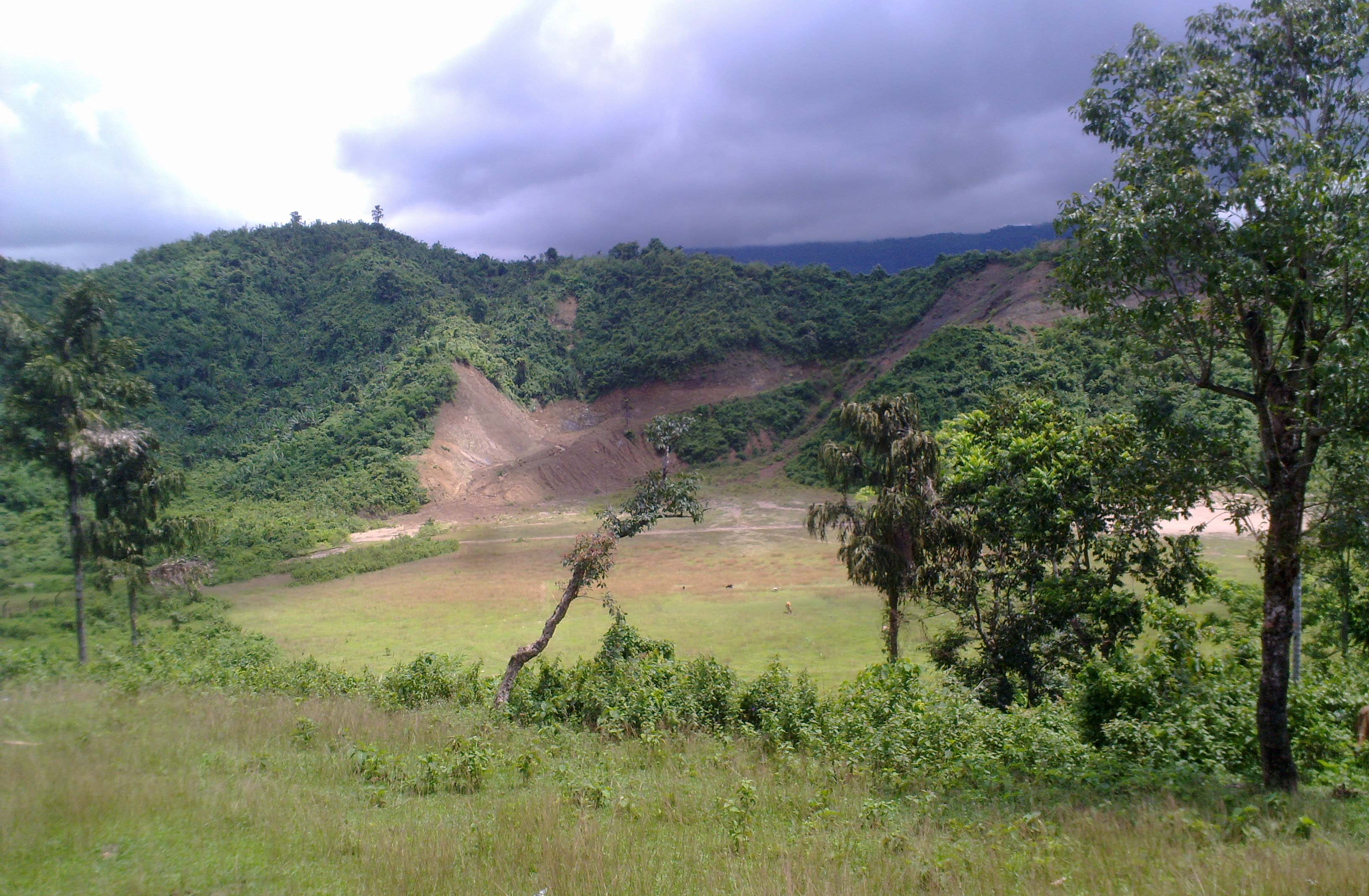
India Bangladesh border

There were nearly 200 enclaves and counter-enclaves (exclaves) that existed on both sides of the border up until 2015. The enclaves or chitmahals (Bengali: ছিটমহল) that ran along the border between the two nations were a longstanding feature of the region. The enclaves were reputedly part of a high-stakes card game or chess games centuries ago between two regional kings, the Raja of Cooch Behar and the Maharaja of Rangpur, and the result of the confused outcome of a treaty between the Kingdom of Cooch Behar and the Mughal Empire. After the partition of India in 1947, Cooch Behar district merged with India and Rangpur went to then-East Pakistan, which became Bangladesh in 1971.

The prime ministers of India and Bangladesh signed a Land Boundary Agreement in 1974 to exchange all enclaves and simplify the international border. In 1974 Bangladesh approved the proposed Land Boundary Agreement, but India did not ratify it. In 2011 the two countries again agreed to exchange enclaves and adverse possessions. A revised version of the agreement was finally adopted by the two countries when the Parliament of India passed the 100th Amendment to the Indian Constitution on 7 May 2015.

Inside the main part of Bangladesh, there were 111 Indian enclaves (17,160.63 acres (69.4466 km^{2})), while inside the main part of India, there were 51 Bangladeshi enclaves (7,110.02 acres (28.7732 km^{2})). Under the Land Boundary Agreement, the enclave residents could continue to reside at their present location or move to the country of their choice. The adverse possession of Boraibari went to Bangladesh. The undemarcated borders between the nations were also finally solved with respect to Daikhata-Dumabari, Muhurichar (an island in the Muhuri River), and Pyrdiwah.

== Maritime boundary ==
India and Bangladesh, with different perceptions of their maritime boundaries and exclusive economic zone, engaged in eight rounds of bilateral negotiations since 1974, which remained inconclusive until 2009 when both agreed to undergo arbitration under the UNCLOS. On 7 July 2014, Arbitration Tribunal resolved the dispute in Bangladesh's favor, which was amicably accepted by both sides, thus ending the dispute. Dispute also included South Talpatti (also called "New Moore"), a small uninhabited offshore sandbar that emerged as an island in the aftermath of the Bhola cyclone in 1970, and disappeared around March 2010.

== Cross-border transport ==
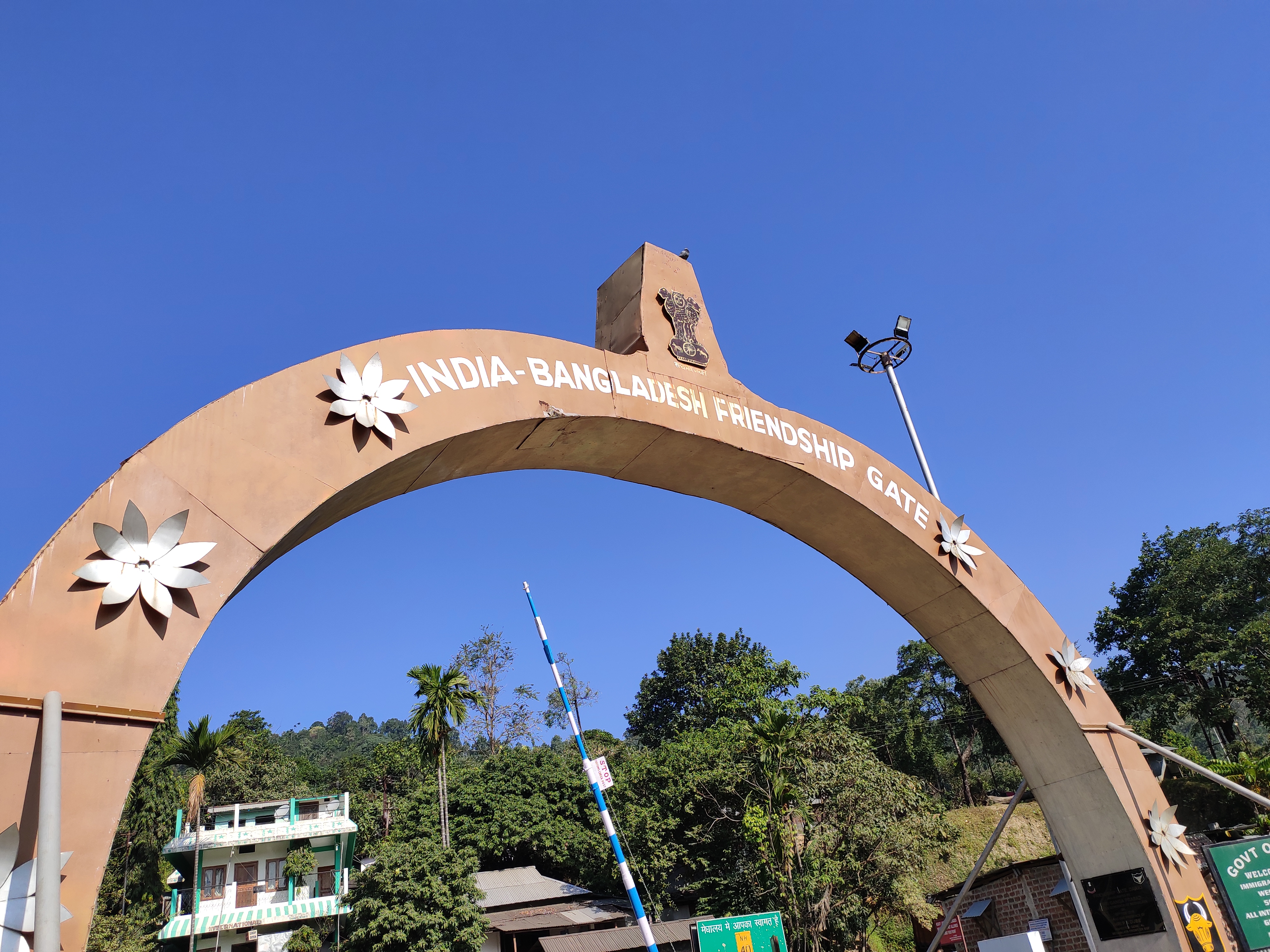
India–Bangladesh Friendship Gate between Tamabil (Bangladesh) and Dawki (India) border.

=== Road links & official crossing points ===
Designated Integrated Check Posts (ICP, with both customs and immigration facilities) and Land Customs Stations (LCS) are:

- Assam
  - Mankachar Land Customs Stations(India) and Rowmari post (Bangladesh)
  - Karimganj–Beanibazar Upazila via Sutarkandi integrated checkpost crossing on NH37(India) and Sheola post (Bangladesh)
  - Karimganj Steamer and Ferry Station (KSFS) Land Customs Stations(India) and Zakiganj post (Bangladesh)
- West Bengal
  - Kolkata–Dhaka via Petrapole-Benapole integrated checkpost crossing
  - Malda–Rajshahi via Mahadipur crossing
  - Changrabandha integrated checkpost
  - Hili
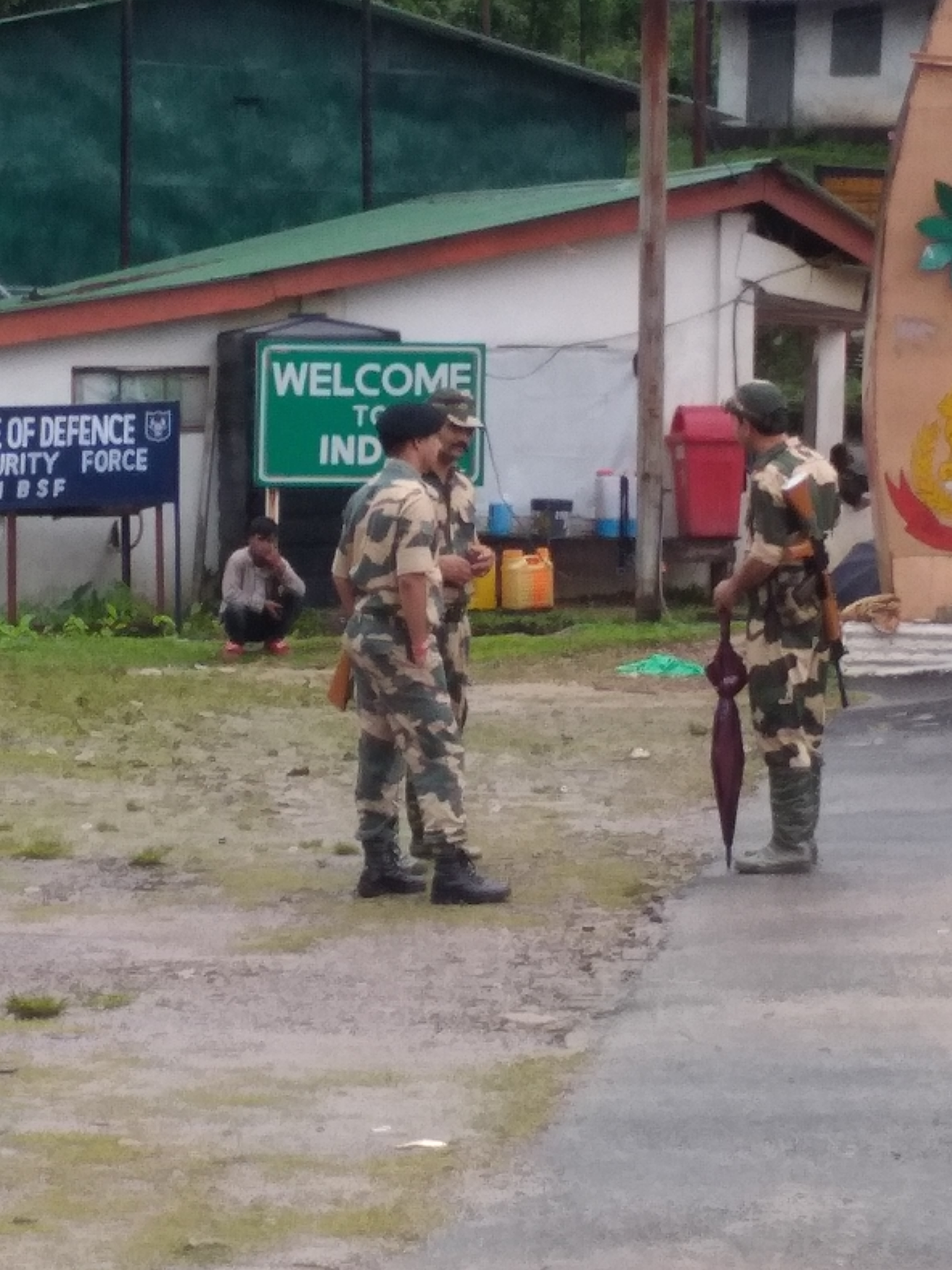
- Indian Border Security Force (BSF) jawans guarding Dawki Integrated Check Post or Dawki border crossing. It is one of the few road border crossings between India and Bangladesh in the West Jaintia Hills district in the state of Meghalaya, India, the corresponding post in Bangladesh is Tamabil post.
  Meghalaya
  - Bagmara Land Customs Stations (India) and Bijoyour post (Bangladesh)
  - Borsara Land Customs Stations(India) and Borsara post (Bangladesh)
  - West Garo Hills–Bakshiganj via Mahendraganj crossing on NH12
  - Tura–Nalitabari via Dalu crossing on NH217 (India) and Nakugaon post (Bangladesh)
  - Shillong–Sylhet via Dawki integrated checkpost crossing (India) and Tamabil post (Bangladesh)
- Tripura
  - Agartala–Dhaka via Agartala integrated checkpost (India) and Akhaura checkpost crossing
  - Santirbazar–Feni via Santirbazar integrated border checkpost road and railway crossing in South Tripura district
  - Sabroom–Ramgarh in Chittagong Division via Ramgarh integrated border checkpost crossing Maitri Setu on Feni River
- Mizoram
  - Kawarpuchiah integrated checkpost, opened in October 2017 by Prime Minister Narendra Modi.

=== Bus service ===
Transport between India and Bangladesh bears much historical and political significance for both countries, which possessed no ground transport links for 43 years, starting with the partition of Bengal and India in 1947. After the establishment of Bangladesh following the Indo-Pakistani War of 1971, bilateral relations improved considerably, but the two governments moved slowly on implementing a 1980 agreement on improving transport links.

The Kolkata–Dhaka Bus started in 1999. In 2001, another bus service was launched to connect Dhaka with Agartala, the capital of the Indian state of Tripura, the second-largest city of Northeast India that borders Bangladesh in the east. In 2015 June direct bus service from Kolkata to Agartala via, Petrapole, Dhaka, Akhoura began. The service is operated by West Bengal surface transport corporation.

=== India–Bangladesh rail links ===
Before partition India and Bangladesh had multiple rail links. In the 21st century, the countries are only connected by rail links on the Western Bangladeshi border, although there are plans to rebuild some of the other rail links. 2 scheduled passenger trains run between Kolkata and Bangladesh as the Maitree Express and the Bandhan Express. One train Mitali Express runs between Dhaka Cantonment and New Jalpaiguri Junction of North Bengal.

== Barrier ==
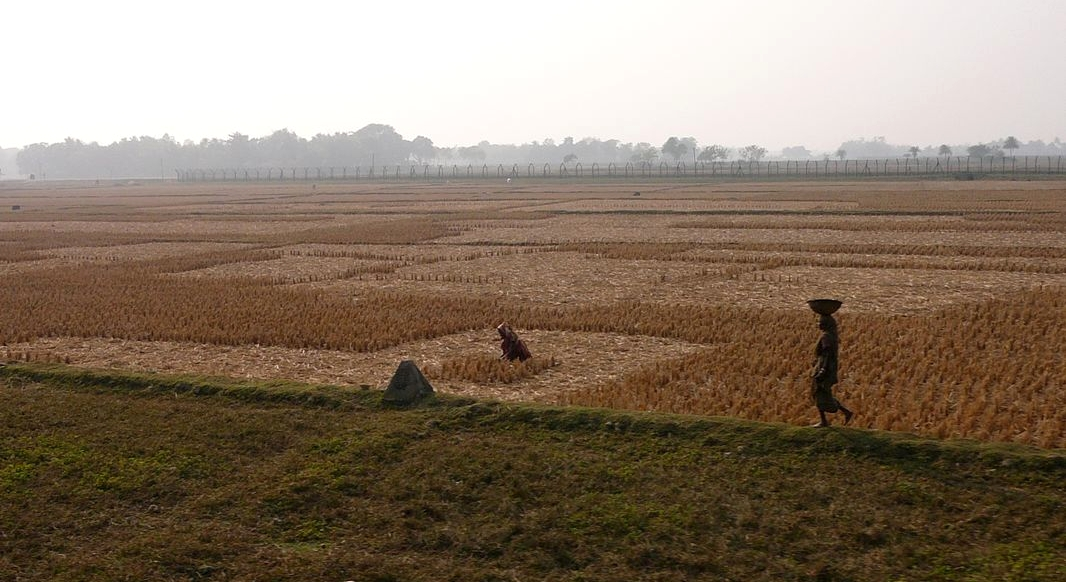
The border fence close to the Hili Border station in West Bangladesh

Out of total length of International Border with Bangladesh 4,096.70 kilometres (2,545.57 mi), Government of India has completely fenced 3,180 kilometres (1,980 mi) by 2024 and the remaining 916 kilometres (569 mi) is covered by physical and non-physical barriers as it is not feasible to fence the entire border due to densely forested rugged mountains, riverine and marshy areas. India has similar fence on borders with Pakistan and Myanmar.

The approved length of the fence along the Indo-Bangladesh border was 3,326.14 kilometres (2,066.77 mi) in 2018, sections of which were progressively constructed, i.e. 2,529 kilometres (1,571 mi) by November 2007, 2,649 kilometres (1,646 mi) by October 2009, 2,735 kilometres (1,699 mi) by March 2011, 2,746.44 kilometres (1,706.56 mi) by February 2018, 2,803.013 kilometres (1,741.712 mi) by July 2019, 3,141 kilometres (1,952 mi) by August 2021, and 3,180 kilometres (1,980 mi) by 2024.

In June 2026, people in Lyngkhong village, Meghalaya, protested against the planned India–Bangladesh border fence. They said the fence would cut off their village from the rest of India and asked for it to be built along the zero line. The event became known as the 2026 Meghalaya border fencing protests.

== Border protection force ==
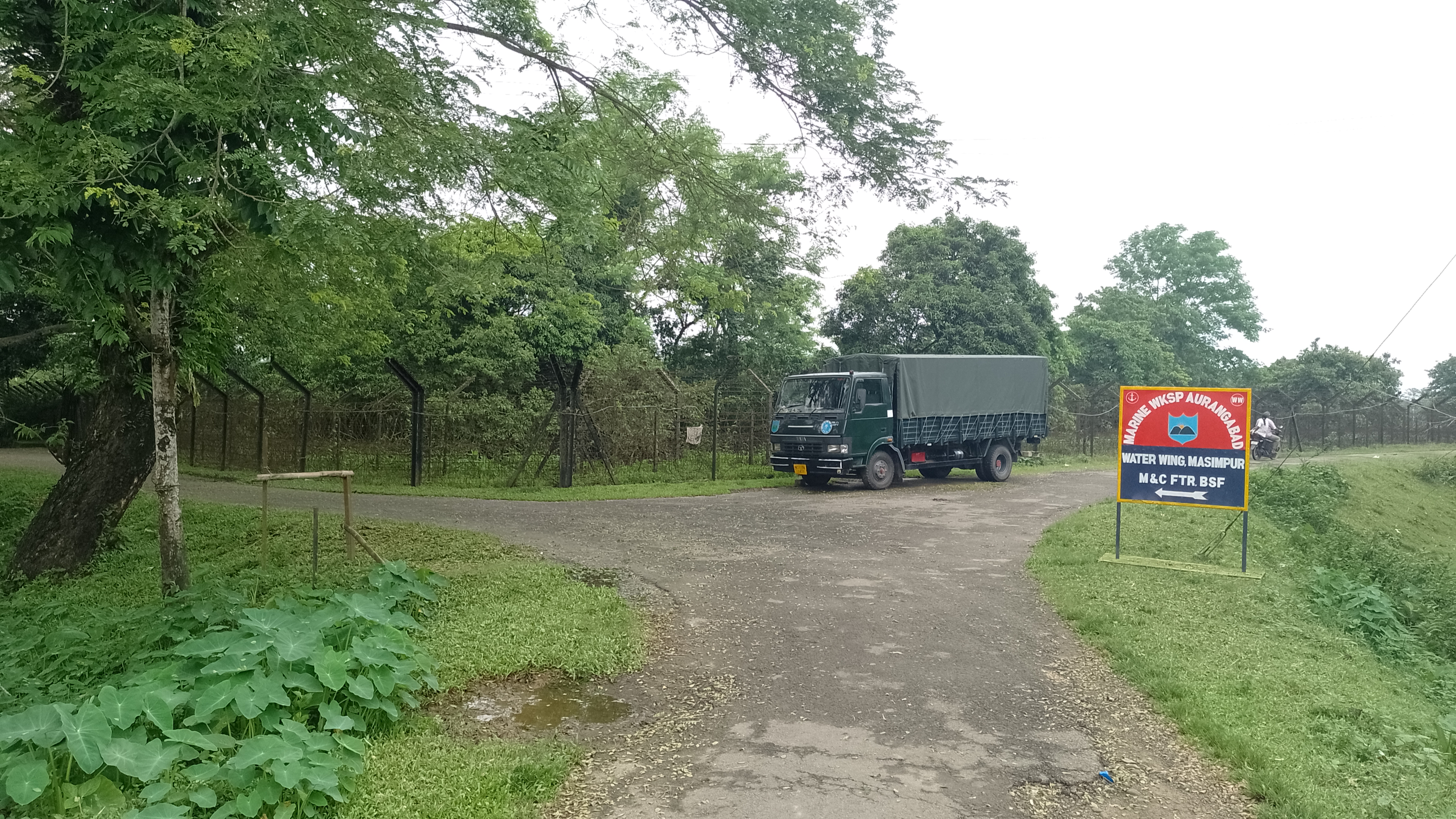
A view of Indo-Bangla border nearby a BSF camp.

Border Security Force (BSF) is India's border guarding organisation on its border with Pakistan and Bangladesh. Border Guards Bangladesh (BGB), formerly known as the Bangladesh Rifles (BDR), is a paramilitary force responsible for the security of Bangladesh's 4,427 kilometres (2,751 mi) long border with India and Myanmar.

== Border ceremonies ==
The Benapole–Petrapole border ceremony at the India-Bangladesh border crossing site is a beating retreat flag ceremony jointly held by the military of both nations every day at 6 pm, which is open to the public as tourist attractions. No special permit or ticket is needed. India has similar border ceremonies with other nations.

== Border markets ==
The India-Bangladesh border has numerous border haats or markets held one day each week. It is not only a market for locals and tourists for buying daily commodities but also a reunion spot for families living on both sides of the international border.

== See also ==
- 2026 Meghalaya border fencing protests
- Tetulia Corridor
- Tin Bigha Corridor
- 2001 Indian–Bangladeshi border conflict
- Bangladesh–India relations
- Border barrier
- Borders of India
- Illegal immigration to India
- Refugees in India
- Bangladeshis in India
- East Bengali refugees
