= Bangladesh–India relations =

- India: Bangladesh

Diplomatic mission
- High Commission of India, Dhaka: High Commission for the People's Republic of Bangladesh, New Delhi

Envoy
- Indian High Commissioner to Bangladesh Dinesh Trivedi: Bangladeshi High Commissioner to India M. Riaz Hamidullah

The bilateral relations between the neighboring People's Republic of Bangladesh and the Republic of India formally began in 1971 with India's recognition of an independent Bangladesh. Bangladesh and India are common members of SAARC, BIMSTEC, IORA and the Commonwealth. The two countries share many cultural ties. In particular, Bangladesh and the east Indian states of West Bengal and Tripura are Bengali-speaking.

India played a pivotal role in Bangladesh's independence by providing direct military intervention and diplomatic support during the 1971 Liberation War against Pakistan. The Indian Army's involvement, culminating in the surrender of Pakistani forces in Dhaka on December 16, 1971, was instrumental in the birth of Bangladesh, fostering initial goodwill and close ties under Sheikh Mujibur Rahman's Awami League government. Post-independence relations remained friendly in the early 1970s, marked by the 1972 Indo-Bangla Treaty of Friendship, Cooperation, and Peace, which committed both nations to non-aggression and mutual assistance.

However, tensions emerged after the 1975 assassination of Mujibur Rahman and the subsequent rise of military rule under Ziaur Rahman and later Hussain Muhammad Ershad (1982–1990). These regimes pursued policies of economic diversification and non-alignment, straining ties with India amid unresolved issues such as border enclaves, smuggling, and migration disputes.

Since the independence of Bangladesh, India has been accused of exerting dominance or "hegemony" in political, economic, military, and cultural spheres of Bangladesh. (Note: Multiple references:) The issue is often debated in the context of bilateral relations, with proponents citing India's role in the 1971 Liberation War and subsequent aid, trade dependencies, and security cooperation as evidence of asymmetric power dynamics. Critics, including some Bangladeshi nationalists, argue it manifests in areas like border disputes, water-sharing agreements (e.g., the Ganges Water Treaty), and political interventions, while Indian perspectives emphasize mutual benefits and regional stability under frameworks like SAARC and BIMSTEC. The notion remains a contentious issue in Bangladeshi discourse, influencing domestic politics and foreign policy.

In recent years, Bangladesh has seen rising anti-India sentiments among its citizens due to the Indian government's perceived anti-Muslim and anti-Bangladeshi activities, including India's interference in the internal politics of Bangladesh, killings of Bangladeshis by Indian BSF, the Citizenship Amendment Act, the rise of Hindutva in India, anti-Bangladeshi misinformation in Indian media as well as India's reluctance to solve the water disputes in common rivers with Bangladesh. In 2021, massive protests in Bangladesh against the state visit by Indian PM Narendra Modi to the country led to the deaths of at least 14 people. Furthermore, India continued to support former Prime Minister Sheikh Hasina during her tenure, even as her administration has faced accusations of increasing authoritarianism and corruption. Additionally, India provided shelter to Sheikh Hasina after her resignation in the July Uprising in Bangladesh, which further boosted Bangladeshi people's anger towards India.

Although some disputes remain unresolved, the relations between the two countries have been characterised as friendly. A historic land boundary agreement was signed on 6 June 2015 which settled decades-old border disputes, while negotiations are still ongoing over the sharing of water of the transboundary rivers.

According to Pew Research Center, in 2026, 43% of Bangladeshis held favourable views on India, compared to 51% who held unfavourable views. On the other side, 25% of Indians expressed favourable views on Bangladesh, compared to 48% who expressed otherwise.

== History ==
=== Pre-21st century ===
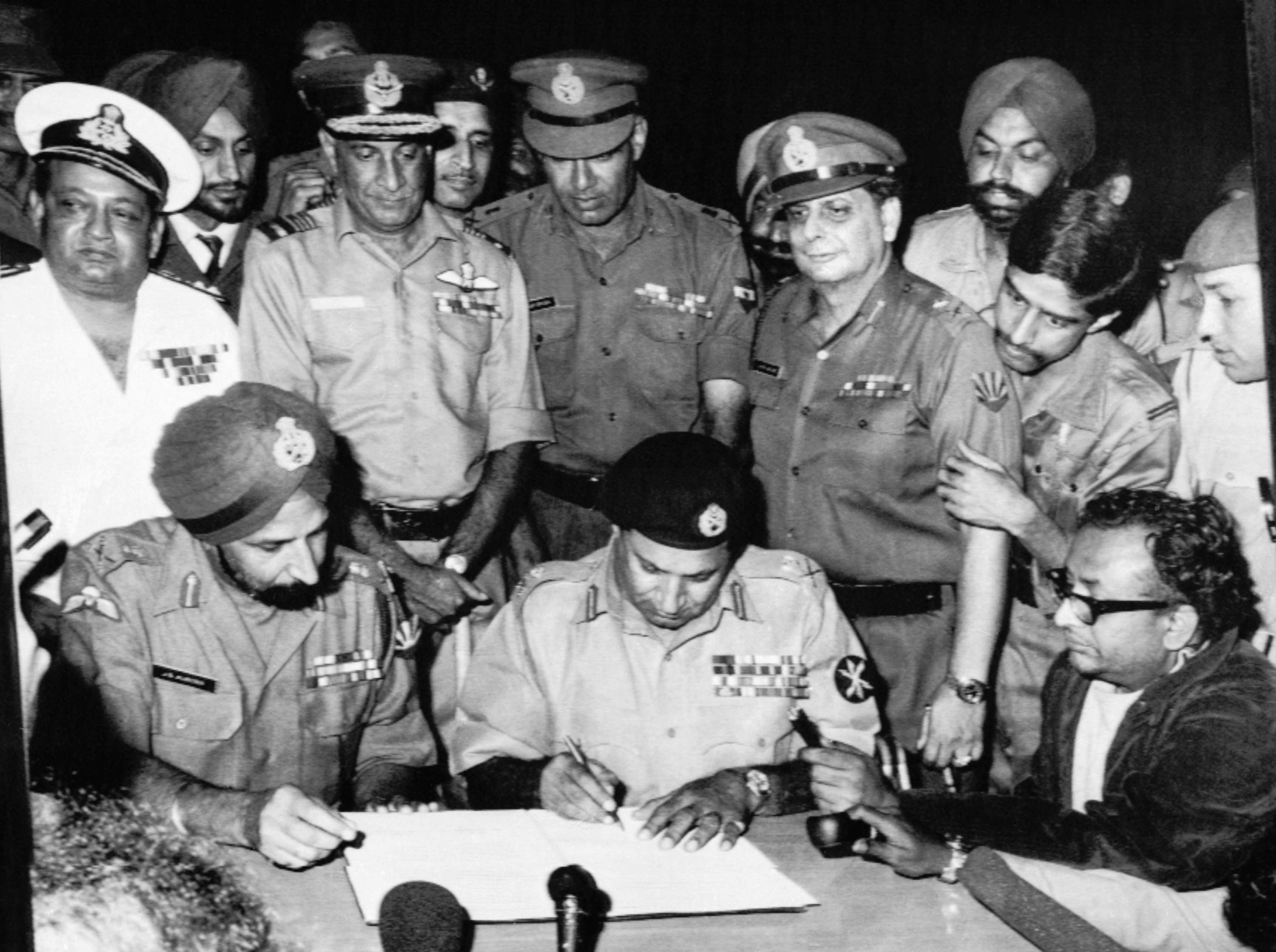
AAK Niazi signing the instrument of surrender, ending the 1971 Bangladesh Liberation War.

The links between the republics of modern-day India and Bangladesh are civilizational, cultural, social, and economic. There is much that unites the two countries – a shared history of the end and common heritage originating from the Bengal region, linguistic and cultural ties, passion for music, literature and the arts. Both countries were under the British Raj during the colonial era, with Bengal having been the first major region conquered by the British, and British India's capital having been established in Calcutta (now Kolkata - very near the modern India-Bangladesh border) until 1911. Rabindranath Tagore, the Bengali polymath from colonial India, created the national anthems of both today's Bangladesh and India in 1905 and 1911, respectively.

The initial basis for modern-day Bangladesh came with the 1905 partition of Bengal. Though this was reversed in 1911 amid much uproar, Bengal still lost some of its prestige with the simultaneous announcement at the Delhi Durbar that the capital was to be moved to Delhi. During the partition of British India in 1947, the Bengal region was again partitioned on religious lines; East Bengal was transferred under the Dominion of Pakistan and West Bengal under the Dominion of India. East Bengal was later renamed as East Pakistan during the implementation of the One Unit Scheme, after which in 1971, the Bangladesh Liberation War resulted in its independence from Pakistan. The Indian Republic was a strong ally during the war, due to which it fought the Indo-Pakistani War of 1971.

From the mid-1970s, however, relations worsened because Bangladesh developed closer ties with Muslim nations, participated in the Organization of the Islamic Conference, and increased emphasis on Islamic identity over the country's ethnolinguistic roots. The two countries developed different Cold War alliances in the 1980s, which further chilled bilateral relations. However, the state visit by President Ershad in 1982 was perceived as a "new chapter" in relations. With the onset of economic liberalization in South Asia, they forged greater bilateral engagement and trade. The historic Ganges Water Sharing Treaty was concluded in 1996. To this day, they are one of the largest trading partners in South Asia. India and Bangladesh are close strategic partners in counter-terrorism, which remains one of the most successful elements of relations between the two nations.

=== 21st century ===
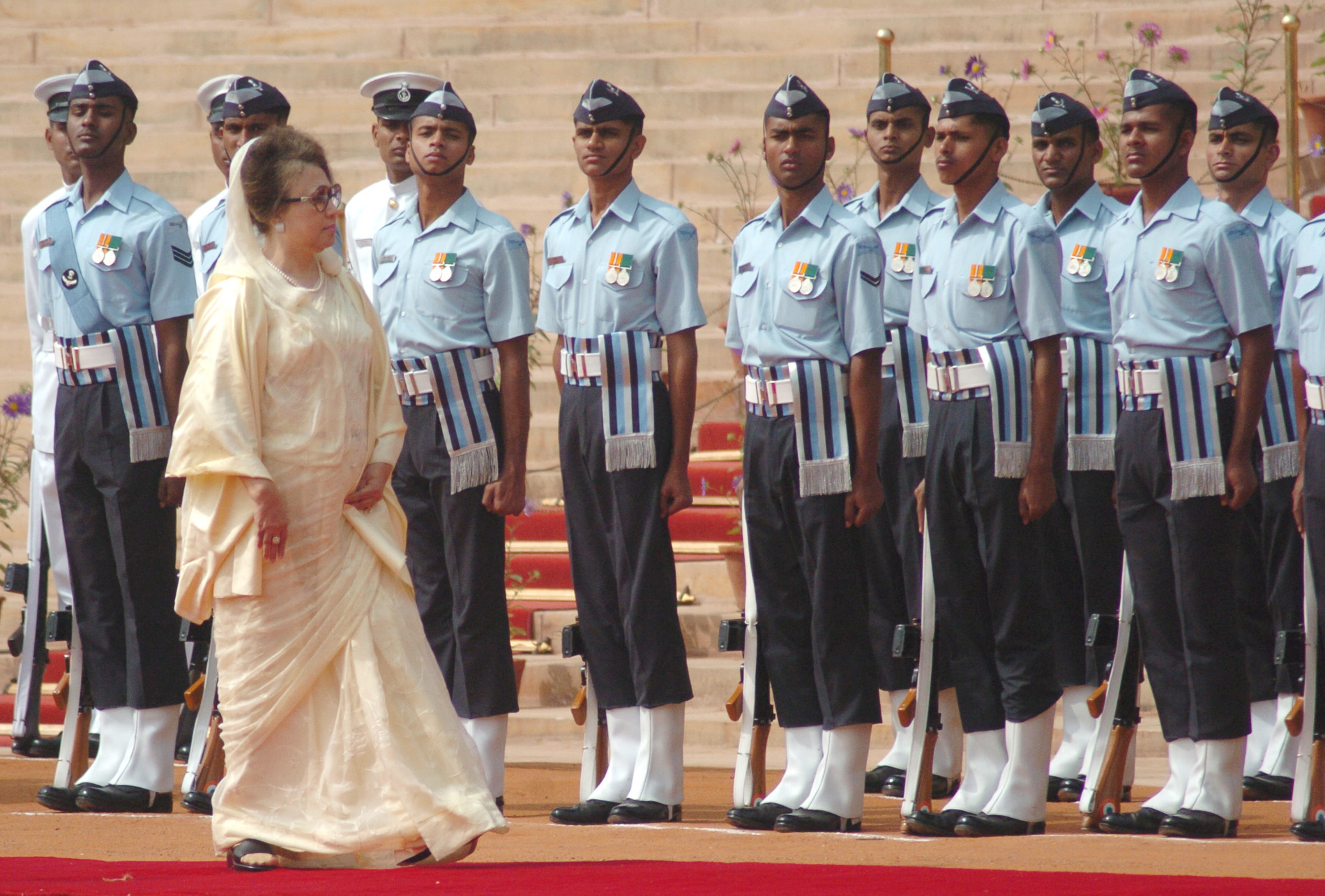
Prime Minister of Bangladesh Khaleda Zia inspecting the guard of honour at a ceremonial reception in New Delhi, March 2006

Prime Minister Sheikh Hasina visited India in 2010 to sign a number of deals. Indian Prime Minister Manmohan Singh visited Dhaka in 2011 to sign a number of deals. Prime Minister Narendra Modi visited Bangladesh, which was historic as the land boundary agreement was solved in 2015.

==== Relationship under Sheikh Hasina (2009–2024) ====
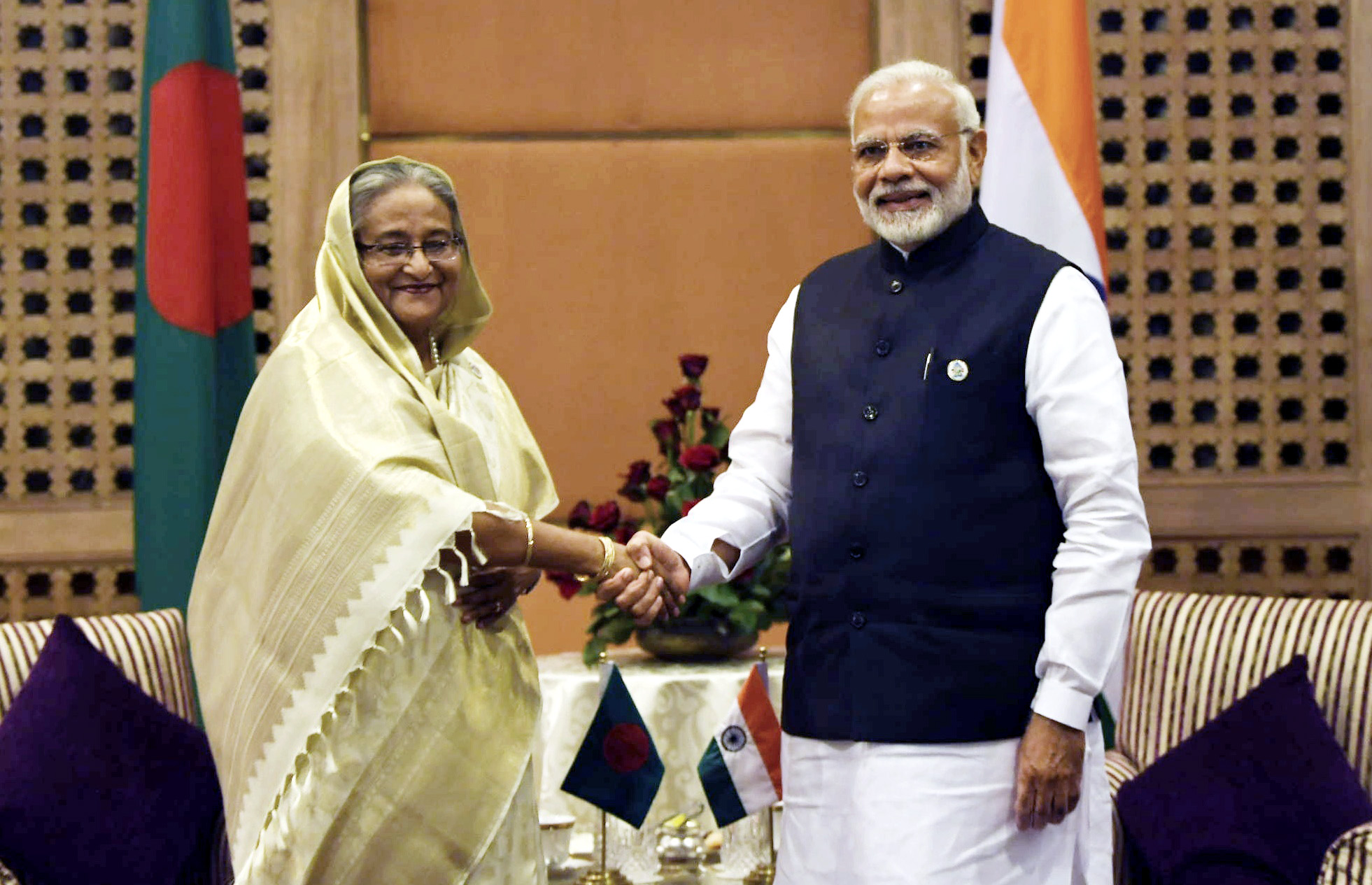
The prime minister of India, Narendra Modi, meeting the prime minister of Bangladesh, Sheikh Hasina, on the sidelines of the 4th BIMSTEC Summit in Kathmandu, Nepal, on 30 August 2018

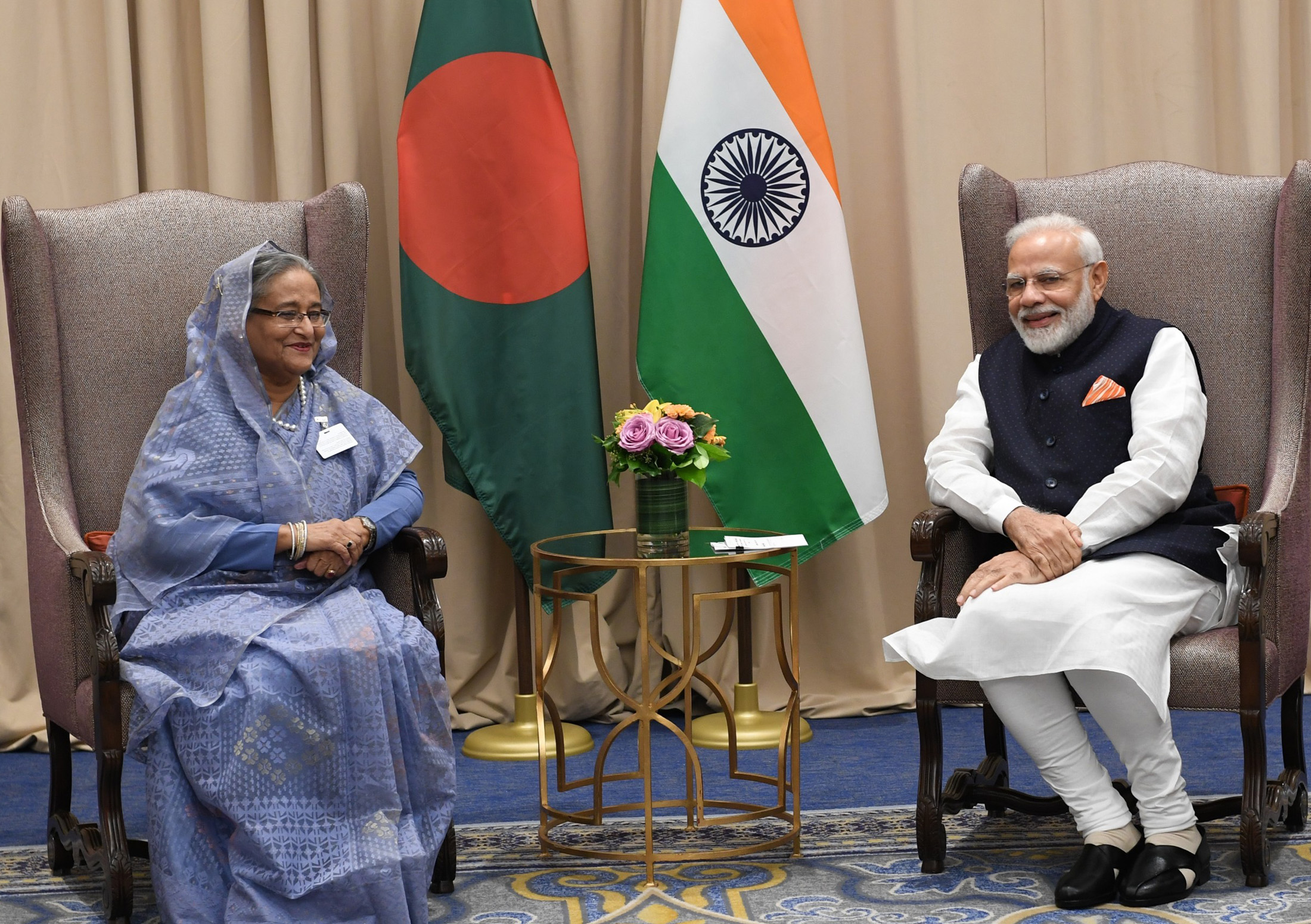
Hasina and Modi in New York City on 27 September 2020

Throughout the premiership of Sheikh Hasina between 2009 and 2024, India and Bangladesh enjoyed the best time in their bilateral relationship in the 21st century.

In September 2011, the two countries signed a major accord on border demarcation to end the 4-decade-old disputes over boundaries. This came to be known as the Tin Bigha Corridor. India also granted 24-hour access to Bangladeshi citizens in the Tin Bigha Corridor. The agreement included the exchange of adversely held enclaves, involving 51,000 people spread over 111 Indian enclaves in Bangladesh and 51 Bangladeshi enclaves in India. The total land involved is over 24,000 acres.

On 9 October that year, the Indian and Bangladeshi armies participated in Sampriti-II (Unity-II), a 14-day-long joint military exercise at Sylhet to increase synergy between their forces.

In 2012, Bangladesh allowed India's Oil and Natural Gas Corporation to ferry heavy machinery, turbines and cargo through Ashuganj for the Palatana Power project in southern Tripura.

From October 2013, India started exporting 500 megawatts of electricity a day to Bangladesh on a cross-border power line that opened that month.

Indian External Affairs Minister Sushma Swaraj visited Bangladesh on her first official overseas trip in June 2014. During this visit, she concluded various agreements to boost ties, including:

- The easing of the visa regime to provide 5-year multiple-entry visas to minors below 13 and elderly above 65.
- A proposal of a special economic zone in Bangladesh.
- An agreement to send back a fugitive accused of murder in India.
- The providing of an additional 100 MW of power from Tripura.
- An increase in the frequency of Maitree Express and start buses between Dhaka and Guwahati and Shillong.
- The authorisation of India to ferry food and grains to the landlocked North East India using Bangladesh’s territory and infrastructure.

Since Indian Prime Minister Narendra Modi's state visit to Bangladesh during June 2015 and the visit of Bangladeshi Prime Minister Sheikh Hasina to India in 2017, as many as 22 agreements were signed by the two sides. Notable developments included the resolution of long-pending land and maritime boundaries asserting the issue of enclaves, the conclusion of over ninety instruments in hi-tech areas, i.e., electronics, cyber-security, space, information technology, and civil nuclear energy, and an observed increase in bilateral trade from US$9 billion to US$10.46 billion in the fiscal year (FY) 2018–19, preceded by US$7 billion to US$9 billion in FY 2017–18, an increase of 28.5 percent. During the visit, India extended a US$2 billion line of credit to Bangladesh & pledged US$5 billion worth of investments. As per the agreements, India's Reliance Power agreed to invest US$3 billion to set up a 3,000 MW LNG-based power plant (which is the single largest foreign investment ever made in Bangladesh). Adani Power also pledged to set up a 1600 MW coal-fired power plant for US$1.5 billion. The agreements included the ones on maritime safety co-operation and curbing human trafficking and fake Indian currency. Modi also announced a line of credit of $2 billion to Bangladesh. The Bangladeshi government initiated three significant infrastructure projects with the backing of India's financial assistance. These projects encompassed a power plant and railway links, among other crucial developments.

In 2018, the leaders of both countries inaugurated the 130 km long Bangladesh-India Friendship pipeline to supply 4 lakh tonnes of diesel to Bangladesh. In September 2018, the Bangladesh cabinet approved the draft of a proposed agreement with India to allow it to use the Chittagong and Mongla seaports for transporting goods to and from its land-locked northeastern states.

===== 2015 Land Boundary Agreement =====
On 7 May 2015, the Indian Parliament, in the presence of Bangladeshi diplomats, unanimously passed the Land Boundary Agreement (LBA) as its 100th constitutional amendment, thereby resolving all 68-year-old border disputes since the end of the British Raj. The bill has been pending ratification since the 1974 Mujib-Indira accords.

At midnight on 31 July 2015, Bangladesh and India swapped territories along their ill-defined border. More than 15,000 people became citizens of India, while 36,000 people took Bangladeshi citizenship after living without nationality for decades. Ending a prolonged dispute, the two nations swapped 162 enclaves on the border region, allowing the people living there to stay or opt for the other country.

==== Relationship with interim government (2024–2026) ====
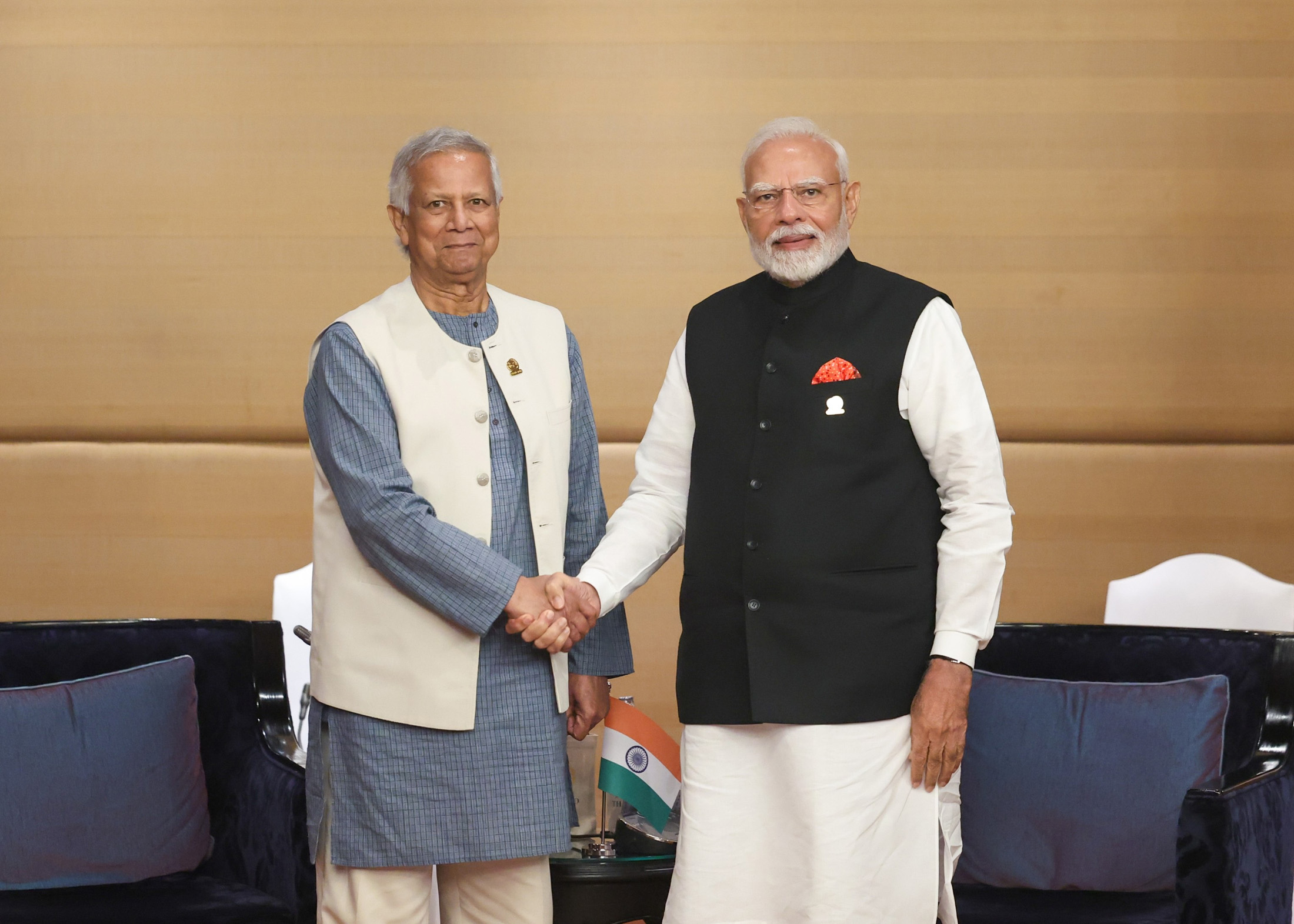
Chief Adviser of Bangladesh Muhammad Yunus meeting the Prime Minister of India Narendra Modi on the sidelines of the 6th BIMSTEC summit in Bangkok, Thailand, on 2 April 2025.

According to India's foreign secretary, Vikram Misri, Prime Minister Narendra Modi was among the first foreign leaders to greet Muhammad Yunus after he assumed office as chief adviser. However, the August 2024 Bangladesh floods hampered Bangladesh–India relations.

In early December 2024, the tensions between the two countries reduced after a diplomatic visit by India's foreign secretary. He called on the Yunus, and the meeting concluded on a positive note. The foreign secretary conveyed that New Delhi envisaged "joint and concerted efforts" and desired increased engagement with Dhaka. However, he also raised the issue of attacks on cultural and religious sites. Yunus described relations with India as "very solid".

On 25 December 2024, the Indian High Commissioner Pranay Verma expressed optimism about Bangladesh–India relations, highlighting mutual benefits from their growing capabilities. A "strong support" for a "democratic, stable, peaceful, progressive, and inclusive" Bangladesh was stated by the high commissioner. The high commissioner also said that New Delhi and Dhaka have a strong stake in each other's progress and prosperity.

On 1 January 2025, an interview of the Bangladesh Army Chief Waker-Uz-Zaman with Prothom Alo English hinted at a positive outlook towards India. General Waker emphasized the importance of a balanced and mutually beneficial relationship between Bangladesh and India. He acknowledged both countries' dependence on each other, with India playing a significant role in trade, work, and medical services. Waker stressed the need for fairness and equality in their interactions, ensuring Bangladeshis didn't feel dominated, preserving national interests while fostering good relations. The relationship was described as a "give and take". When questioned on security cooperation, the general stated that Bangladesh would not do anything that goes against India's strategic interests and expected India to reciprocate. On the same day, Bangladesh Foreign Affairs Adviser Md. Touhid Hossain mentioned that Bangladesh's ties with India would "extend beyond a single issue" and assured that maintaining good relations with India was among the priorities in 2025.

On 4 April 2025, Yunus and Modi met each other for the first time since the resignation of Hasina in August 2024. Both leaders engaged in a bilateral meeting on the sidelines of the 6th BIMSTEC summit in Bangkok. Amongst the discussed topics, were the extradition of Hasina, border killings, Ganges and Teesta River water sharing, persecution of Hindu minorities in Bangladesh, and provocative statements made from both sides. Press Secretary Shafiqul Alam described the meeting as "constructive, productive, and fruitful". In the meeting, Yunus also gifted a picture of Modi honouring him in the 102nd Indian Science Congress in 2015. Bangladesh's largest opposition party, the Bangladesh Nationalist Party (BNP), welcomed the meeting, with its General Secretary Mirza Fakhrul Islam Alamgir calling it a "ray of great hope".

On 26 June 2025, Bangladeshi Adviser of Foreign Affairs Md Touhid Hossain noted that Bangladesh–India relations were going through a "readjustment phase", while refuting the claim to be frozen & asserting that Bangladesh had always been open to engage with India.

==== Relationship under Tarique Rahman (2026–present) ====
Before Tarique Rahman was even officially sworn in as the PM, Indian PM Narendra Modi personally congratulated him on his victory in the 2026 Bangladesh general elections in a direct phone call. Modi described Rahman's electoral victory as decisive.

A reset in ties was observed with the victory of BNP and the swearing in of Tarique Rahman. Rahman's adviser suggested the same. India welcomed the transition to the elected government. Modi was officially invited to Rahman's swearing-in ceremony. Lok Sabha speaker Om Birla met Rahman at the ceremony and conveyed wishes from India. An official statement said that it reflected the "deep and enduring friendship" between the two countries and reaffirmed New Delhi's commitment to the democratic processes. Birla, accompanied by Vikram Misri, handed over a personal congratulatory letter from Modi to Rahman that also invited Rahman and his family to India. Additionally, Mirza Fakhrul Islam Alamgir indicated that Bangladesh would not restrict itself in its pursuit of broader relations with New Delhi over Sheikh Hasina's presence in India. In the 2026 Iran War, both countries saw rising energy prices amid an energy crisis. India acted as a stabilizer for its neighbours, including Bangladesh, providing them with oil to keep their economies stable as well.

On 16 August 2026, Bangladesh said that Prime Minister Tarique Rahman would not visit India until New Delhi extradited former prime minister Sheikh Hasina, who remains in India. Bangladesh also said that it sought mutually beneficial relations with India while pursuing a foreign policy based on sovereignty and non-interference.

== Diplomatic events ==
On 6 December, Bangladesh and India celebrate Friendship Day, commemorating India's recognition of Bangladesh and the continued friendship between the two countries.

Since November 2013, a "Wagah Border-like ceremony" was being organised at the Petrapole-Benapole border checkpoint. The ceremony included parades, a march-past and lowering of the national flags of both countries at sundown on the eastern border.

In 2019, the Indian Parliament passed the Citizenship Amendment Act (CAA), following which Bangladesh's Foreign Minister AK Abdul Momen and Home Minister Asaduzzaman Khan cancelled their trips to India. Later, minister Shahriar Alam also cancelled his visit to India. Sheikh Hasina was critical of the CAA, describing it as "not necessary", but nevertheless affirmed the CAA and the National Register of Citizens were "internal matters" of India.

In 2023, Bangladesh backed India in its diplomatic feud with Canada over the killing of Hardeep Singh Nijjar, describing Canada as a "hub for murderers".

== Areas of cooperation ==
=== Economic ===
Bangladesh-India bilateral trade was over US$10 billion in 2018–19. Bilateral trade between India and Bangladesh stood at US$6.6 billion in 2013–14, with India's exports at US$6.1 billion and imports from Bangladesh at US$462 million, representing more than double the value of US$2.7 billion five years ago.

Bangladesh's cabinet approved a revised trade deal with India under which the two nations would be able to use each other's land and water routes for sending goods to a third country, removing a long-standing barrier in regional trade. Under the deal, India would also be able to send goods to Myanmar through Bangladesh. It incorporated a provision that the deal would be renewed automatically after five years if neither of the countries had any objection.

During the state visit by Prime Minister Sheikh Hasina to New Delhi in September 2022, she urged Indian businesses to invest in her nation's burgeoning manufacturing, energy, and transportation sectors, as well as its infrastructure projects. In his response to her invitation, CII President Sanjiv Bajaj discussed energy and infrastructure, as well as the ways in which connectivity can be utilized to promote shared prosperity. He went on to say that "India's experience with Digital India ought to be utilized to better sync it with Digital Bangladesh in order to provide more opportunities for digital and financial inclusion."

==== Loans ====
In 2011, India approved a $750 million loan for developing Bangladesh infrastructure and offered another $1 billion soft loan for infrastructure development in 2014.

=== Historical economic cooperation ===
==== Cement sector ====
India has been of indirect assistance for the creation of the cement sector in Bangladesh that eventually propelled it to the league of the top 20 cement producers in the world. India and France first brought cement production to Bangladesh. In 1974, the French company Lafarge decided to set up a factory in Sylhet that used limestone from the Indian state of Meghalaya.

=== Aid provided by India ===
==== Post liberation aid program ====
During the first 6 months right after the liberation war, until June 1972, India committed $220 million, or approximately $1.6 billion if adjusted with inflation as of 2024, to Bangladesh, which made it the largest aid provider at that time.

==== Annual aid ====
- In 2021, India allocated INR 200 crores for the fiscal year 2021–2022.
- In 2022, India announced approximately INR 300 crores in aid to Bangladesh.
- In 2023, India allocated INR 200 crores in aid.
- In 2024, India allocated INR 120 crores for Bangladesh.
- In 2025, India allocated INR 120 crores.
- In 2026, India allocated INR 60 crores. The budget was slashed due to tense relations with the outgoing interim government and alleged violence against minorities.

==== India's line of credit program ====
India has provided Bangladesh about $7.862 billion through four different Lines of Credit (LOC) programs, making Bangladesh the largest recipient under India's LOC initiative. This assistance has supported infrastructure development across various sectors, with 14 projects successfully completed out of 43 under implementation as of 2021. By October 2021, $865 million had been disbursed, and contracts worth over $990.85 million had been awarded in the preceding three years, with an additional $325.58 million in the finalization stage. India's active coordination with Bangladesh's Economic Relations Division (ERD) and other stakeholders has significantly improved project execution speeds, fostering mutual progress and regional development.

=== Defence ===
Chief of Air Staff of Bangladesh, Air Chief Marshal Masihuzzaman Serniabat, after taking the demo flight of LCA Tejas

During Sheikh Hasina's four-day visit to New Delhi in April 2017, Bangladesh and India signed two defence agreements, the first such agreements between India and any of its neighbours. Under the agreements, the militaries of the two countries will conduct joint exercises and training. India will help Bangladesh achieve self-sufficiency in defence manufacturing, and will also provide the Bangladesh military with expert training, and technical and logistic support. India also extended its first-ever defence-related line of credit to a neighbouring country, by providing Bangladesh with $500 million to purchase defence equipment.

Also, the militaries of the two countries have played quite an extensive role in taking up common issues to enhance and conduct training programmes to deal with counter terrorism issues, natural disasters, and ensure Humanitarian Assistance and Disaster Reliefs (HADR). In March 2019, the Indian Army's GOC-in-C of the Eastern Army Command, General M.M. Naravane, visited the Chief of Army Staff of Bangladesh, General Aziz Ahmed, to hold talks related to boosting of intelligence sharing between the 2 countries along with developing other areas of defence cooperation. The visit has most importantly come up at the time when Myanmar decided to take strong actions in order to act against the operating insurgent groups that were operating foiling up terrorist activities on both the sides of India and Myanmar, along with that had discussions on various options to enhance the conduction of military exercises at a more rapid and strong scale.

Prime Minister Narendra Modi said: "India would not like to impose anything which Bangladesh may find not suitable to its requirement. The bilateral document under consideration is aimed at institutionalizing the existing mechanism and streamlining the ongoing cooperation between both the countries", an official said. A potential joint road-map for developing the blue economy in the area was discussed.

Also, both prime ministers, of India and Bangladesh, had welcomed their initiatives for developing a closer effort to strengthen maritime security partnerships and also they appreciated the finalization of a Memorandum of Understanding (MoU) related to the establishment of a Coastal Surveillance Radar System in Bangladesh's Chittagong and Mongla ports.

==== Counterterrorism cooperation ====
During Sheikh Hasina's 2019 state visit to New Delhi, she held talks with Prime Minister Narendra Modi, who praised Bangladesh's zero-tolerance policy on terrorism and its efforts to promote regional peace and stability. Both leaders acknowledged that terrorism remained a major threat and reaffirmed their shared commitment to eliminating it in all forms. They also noted ongoing cooperation between the two countries, including agreements reached during the Bangladeshi home minister's visit to India in August 2019 to strengthen collaboration against terrorism, extremist groups, arms and drug smuggling, counterfeit currency, and organized crime.

=== United Nations and international community ===
==== Bangladesh's inclusion in the United Nations ====
According to the Diplomatic Bluebook for 1972 published by MoFA Japan, India acted behind the scenes in 1972, which led to the recognition of Bangladesh by 98 countries, which subsequently helped unlock $1,300 million in aid. India's bid for recognition of Bangladesh at the UN faced tough opposition from Pakistan and China, and the process was prolonged. Bangladesh was eventually recognized by the United Nations in September 1974.

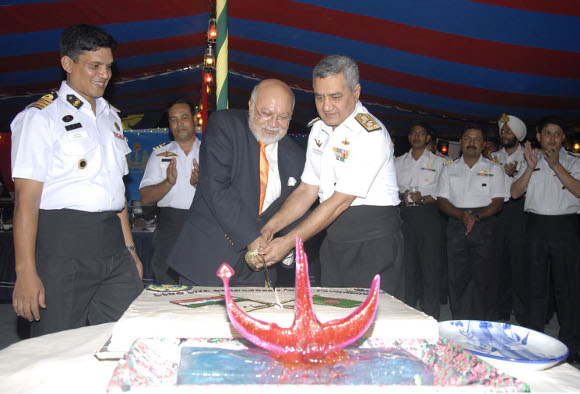
The High Commissioner of Bangladesh to India (centre) with Indian Navy officials.

=== Energy ===
In 2016, a deal between Modi and Hasina was criticized. Bangladeshi critics accused the deal of setting a high price for the import of electricity, especially from Tripura. Equipment for the plant was sent through Bangladesh, which waived most of the transit fees. Adani Power said on 8 November 2017 its arm Adani Power (Jharkhand) has inked a long-term pact with the Bangladesh Power Development Board to supply electricity from its upcoming 1,600 MW plant at Godda in Jharkhand.

Amid the 2026 Iran war, India assumed the role of "first responder" in the neighborhood and agreed to help Bangladesh secure 45,000 tonnes of diesel supply while the energy prices soared.

=== Readymade garment sector ===
==== Import of cotton ====
Readymade garments account for the majority of Bangladesh's exports, but the sector itself is heavily reliant on imports of cotton from countries like India, China, and Brazil. Bangladesh's economic boom, reliant on this sector, relies heavily on raw materials imported from India. According to The Observatory of Economic Complexity, in the year 2022 alone, raw cotton accounted for about 21% of Indian exports to Bangladesh. Bangladesh imports cotton primarily from India at about $942 million.

=== Scholarship ===
Every year, 200 Bangladeshi students receive ICCR scholarships. India has offered scholarships for meritorious Bangladeshi undergraduate and postgraduate students and PhD researchers to undertake studies in traditional systems of medicine like Ayurveda, Unani and Homeopathy, according to the Indian High Commission in Dhaka. In 2017, 400 Indian medical students protested in Chittagong after they failed to register with the Bangladesh Medical and Dental Council.

=== Medical cooperation ===
Following the J-7 crash at Milestone School, Indian Prime Minister Modi extended condolences and medical help to the Yunus administration. An Indian medical team was sent to help.

==== COVID-19 pandemic cooperation ====
Bangladesh started mass COVID-19 vaccinations with India's Serum Institute Covishield vaccines on 7 February 2021. Due to a second wave of COVID-19 in India, the vaccine export was halted. It hampered the vaccination program in Bangladesh.

In April 2021, Bangladesh sent medicines and medical equipment to India following the deteriorating COVID-19 situation in India. The relief package consisted of approximately 10,000 vials of Remdesivir, (produced in Bangladesh by Beximco) anti-viral injections, oral anti-viral, 30,000 PPE kits, and several thousand zinc, calcium, vitamin C and other necessary tablets. In May 2021, the government of Bangladesh sent a second consignment of COVID-19 relief consisting of antibiotics, paracetamol, protective equipment and hand sanitiser.

== Contentions ==
Key flashpoints included chronic disagreements over river water sharing, particularly the Ganges (Padma) waters, leading to droughts in Bangladesh and the contentious 1996 Ganges Water Treaty under Bangladeshi prime minister Sheikh Hasina. Trade imbalances persisted, with Bangladesh facing a significant deficit due to India's dominance in exports like cotton and machinery, while non-tariff barriers hindered Bangladeshi goods. Border skirmishes and killings by India's Border Security Force (BSF) further fueled resentment, with human rights groups documenting hundreds of civilian deaths annually in the 2000s and 2010s.

The perception of Indian influence gained traction among some Bangladeshi political parties — particularly the Bangladesh Nationalist Party (BNP) and the Jamaat-e-Islami — intellectuals, and citizens, who accused India of meddling in elections, supporting favored regimes (e.g., post-2009 Awami League governments), and leveraging security concerns like militancy to exert influence. This view intensified during periods of political upheaval, such as the 1/11 caretaker government era (2007–2008) and the July Uprising that ousted Hasina, amid allegations of Indian backing for her administration. Indian observers, conversely, highlight mutual benefits through frameworks like SAARC, BIMSTEC, and joint counter-terrorism efforts, framing the relationship as one of strategic partnership rather than dominance. Analysts argue India exerts direct and indirect influence on Bangladesh's internal matters, harming national sovereignty.

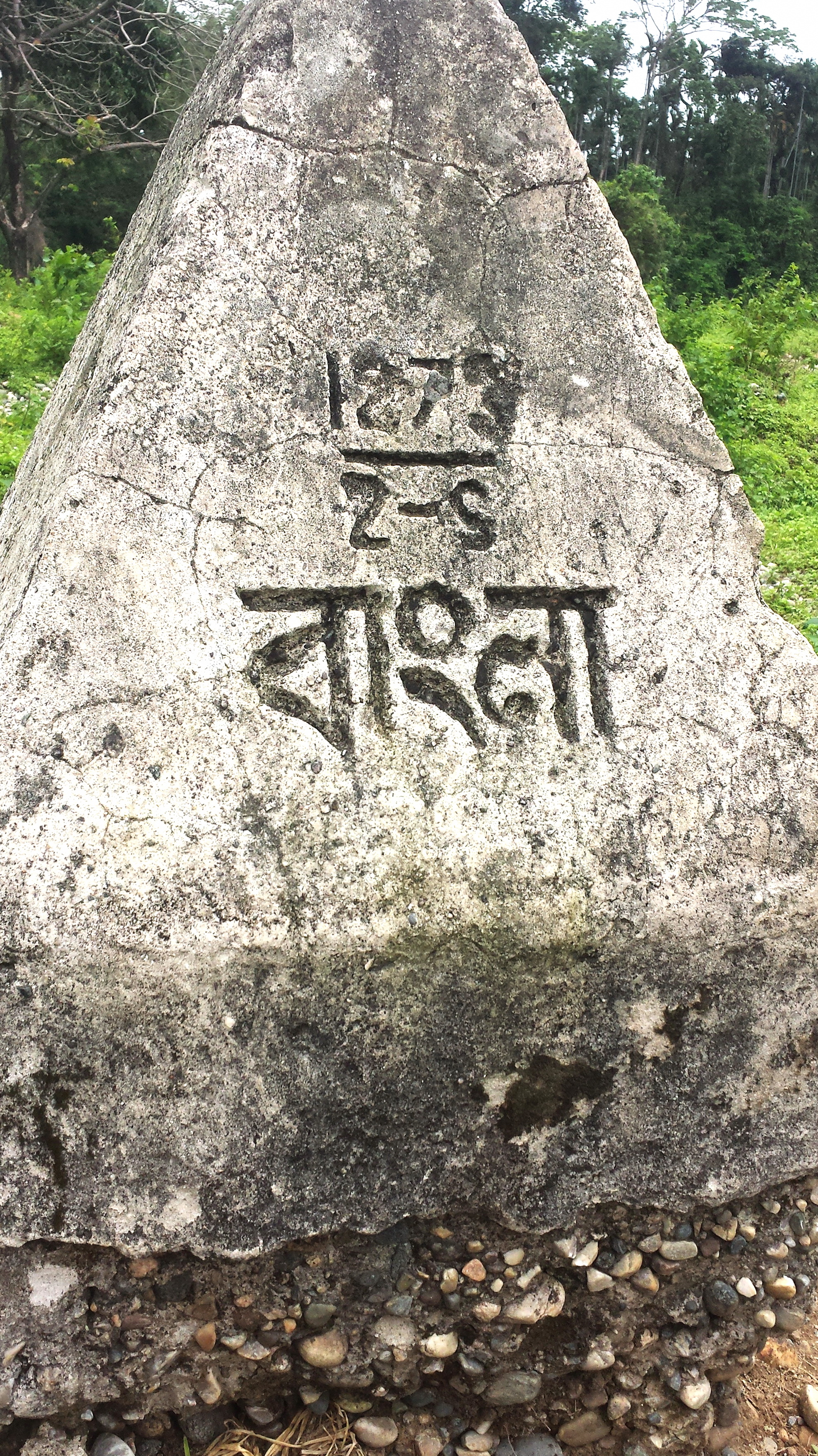
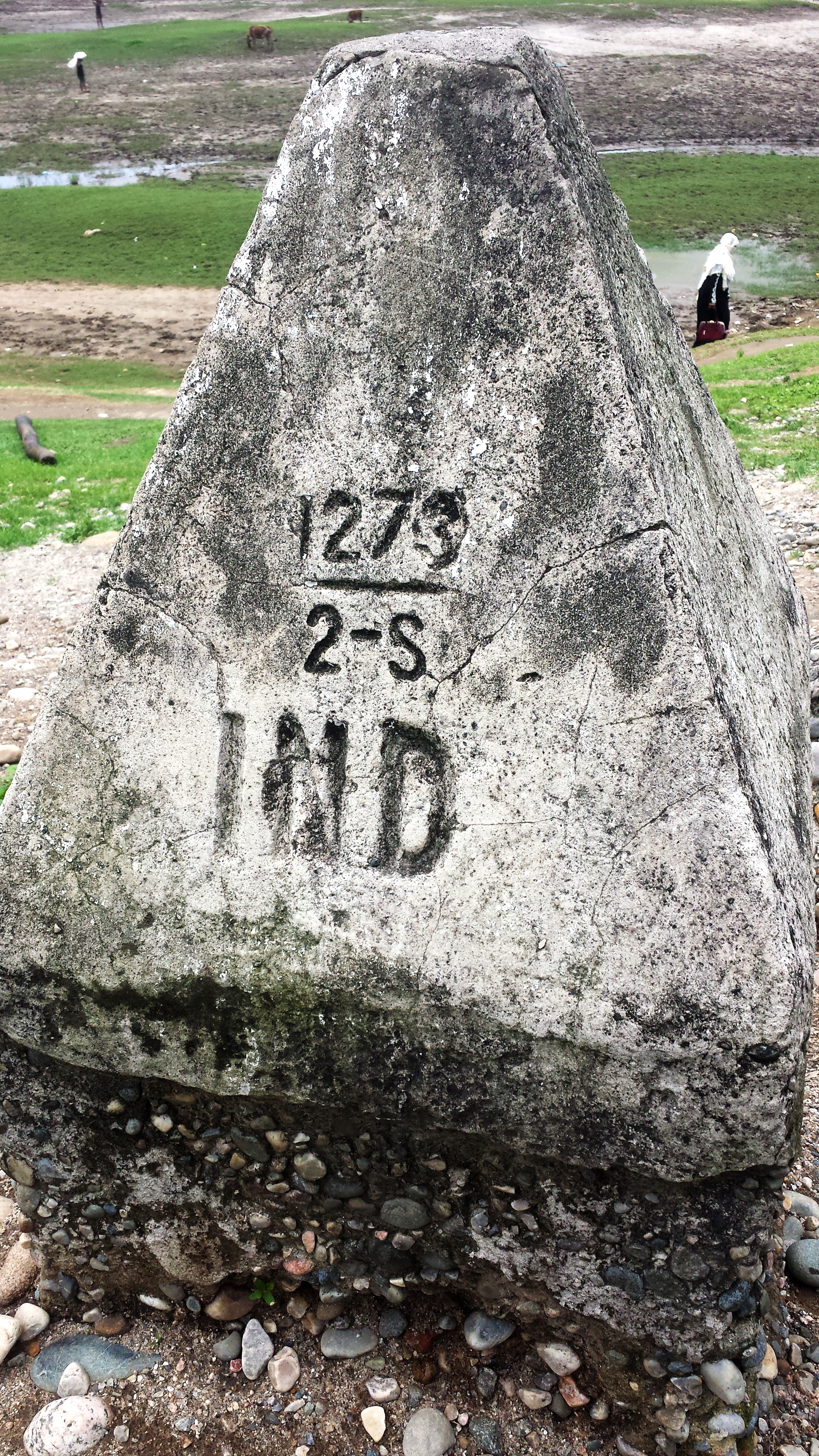
A post of the Bangladesh–India border

=== Economic dominance ===
India exerts significant economic influence over Bangladesh through trade imbalances, transit agreements, tied loans, and strategic pressures, often perceived as one-sided and exploitative.

==== Transit issues ====
Bangladesh provides India transit facilities through its territory to connect northeastern states, formalized in 2015 protocols, but critics argue it yields minimal revenue while imposing heavy costs. Infrastructure strain on roads and rails requires Bangladesh-funded maintenance, security, and lost economic opportunities from reserved routes, without fair tolls or reciprocity. This arrangement prioritizes India's connectivity needs over Bangladesh's, exemplifying unequal bilateral gains.

==== Lines of credit and loan conditions ====
India offers lines of credit (LoCs) at low interest for infrastructure projects, but mandates 65-75% procurement from Indian companies, sidelining local firms and channeling funds back to India's economy. Over $8 billion in LoCs since 2016 have funded bridges, power plants, and rail lines, yet tied terms limit competition and foster dependency. Critics view this as neocolonial financing that boosts Indian exports while constraining Bangladesh's industrial growth.

==== Discouraging Chinese investments ====
India pressures Bangladesh to limit Chinese involvement in strategic projects like deep-sea ports (e.g., Payra), power plants, and rail corridors, citing security concerns over China's regional expansion. In response, India counters with its LoCs as alternatives, effectively blocking Beijing while securing Indian contracts. This "sticks and carrots" tactic aligns Bangladesh's choices with New Delhi's interests, evident in scaled-back Chinese bids for projects worth billions.

=== Water resources and environmental dominance ===
India unilaterally diverts shared rivers, impacting Bangladesh's agriculture and ecology.

==== Stalled Teesta Deal ====
The Teesta water-sharing agreement remains unresolved since negotiations began in 2011, with India refusing to finalize terms despite Bangladesh's dependence on the river for 7,000 km^{2} of irrigation in the north. Upstream dams like Gajoldoba barrage in India reduce dry-season flows by up to 80%, causing water shortages that devastate rice production and exacerbate droughts in Rangpur and northern districts. Domestic politics in India, particularly opposition from West Bengal, block progress, leaving Bangladesh vulnerable while India prioritizes its water needs.

==== Farakka Barrage ====
The Farakka Barrage, operational since 1975 on the Ganges, diverts water to the Hooghly River, drastically reducing downstream flows into Bangladesh during lean months. This has increased salinity intrusion in southwestern regions, rendering over 100,000 hectares of farmland unproductive and threatening the Sundarbans mangrove ecosystem, home to the Bengal tiger and vital for coastal protection. Long-term impacts include declining fish stocks, shrimp farming losses, and groundwater depletion, costing Bangladesh billions in economic damages annually.

=== Cultural dominance ===
Bollywood films, Indian TV channels, and OTT platforms dominate Bangladeshi households via satellite, marginalizing local cinema, music, and Dhallywood productions. The impact of Indian media on Bangladeshi film production reportedly led to the "ghettoization" of Bangladeshi cinema.

=== Allegations of covert attacks and intelligence interference ===
==== Assassination of Ziaur Rahman ====
Ziaur Rahman, Bangladesh's former president and BNP founder, was killed in 1981 during a military coup at Chittagong Circuit House. Conspiracy theories, voiced by BNP leaders like Ruhul Kabir Rizvi, claim RAW orchestrated it due to Zia's independent policies shifting away from Indian influence. Official accounts attribute it to internal army factions, but allegations from senior BNP leader persists of RAW involvement.

==== Assassination of Osman Hadi ====
Violence erupted over the assassination of student leader Osman Hadi in December 2025 in Dhaka. Hadi, the spokesperson of Inqilab Moncho, was shot during an election campaign and died in Singapore, fueling anti-India unrest. India's foreign ministry rejected the allegations as "false narratives" and said that interim government had not shared evidence for these accusations. Dhaka police later said the suspects had fled to india, which Meghalaya police and BSF denied. In March 2026, West Bengal police arrested suspects in the case.

=== Bangladesh Rifles revolt ===
The 2009 Bangladesh Rifles revolt and killings at BDR headquarters in Pilkhana, Dhaka drew claims of Indian involvement from political parties, victims' families, and media. An interim government commission reported 921 Indians entered Bangladesh during the event, with 67 unaccounted for; it alleged India aimed to weaken Bangladesh Army.

Victims' families accused then-prime minister Sheikh Hasina of orchestrating it for Indian interests and power retention. BNP leaders blamed India directly for weakening the military. India denied involvement, with diplomat Pinak Ranjan Chakravarty calling it against their interests and suggesting BNP-Jamaat support instead.

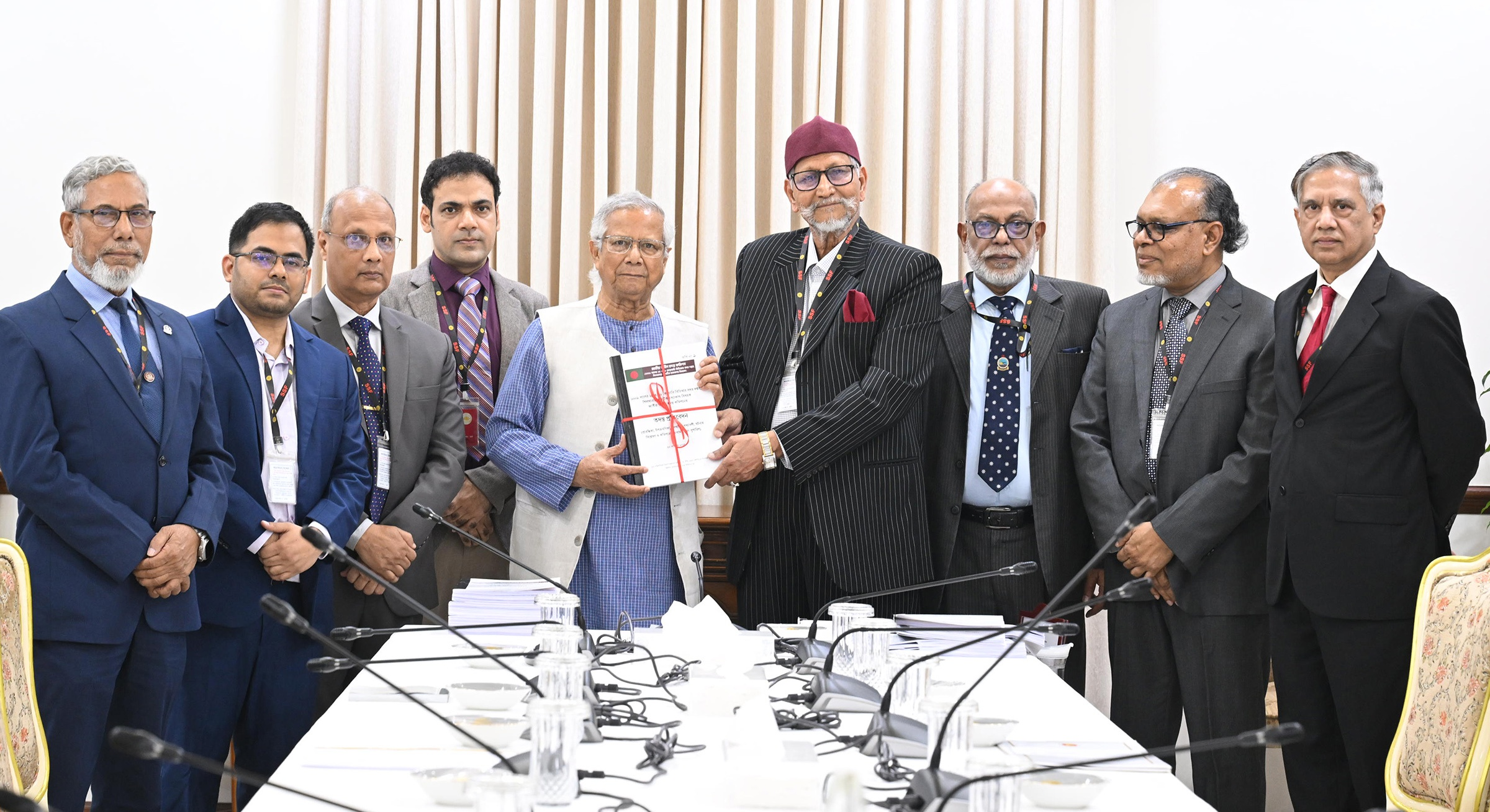
National Independent Inquiry Commission on BDR mutiny submitting the reinvestigated report to Chief Adviser Muhammad Yunus

Following the fall of the Hasina government in September 2024, several speakers at a discussion in Dhaka publicly accused former Prime Minister Sheikh Hasina and the Indian government of involvement in the mutiny, calling for a renewed investigation and the restoration of the force's original name, BDR. Some participants, including retired military officers and relatives of victims, alleged broader political motives and external influence behind the incident.

On 15 December 2024, the Ministry of Home Affairs informed the High Court that it would not form a commission to re-investigate the massacre, prompting public criticism. Two days later, leaders of the Students Against Discrimination announced plans for protests if a commission was not created. On 23 December, the ministry established a seven-member commission to conduct a fresh inquiry.

On 30 November 2025, the commission released its findings, concluding that the massacre was a planned operation rather than a spontaneous mutiny. The report alleged involvement of senior Awami League figures, claiming that Sheikh Fazle Noor Taposh acted as a key coordinator and that then–Prime Minister Sheikh Hasina approved the operation. It also cited evidence destruction and missing key individuals during the original probe. That same day, the commission’s chief stated that 921 Indian nationals had entered Bangladesh around the time of the incident, with 67 remaining unaccounted for. The report suggested that the killings were planned with the involvement of external and domestic actors. According to the 360-page report submitted to authorities, a high-level meeting at the office of Fazle Noor Taposh, with the presence of other senior figures from Awami League, such as Sheikh Selim, Sohel Taj, and a group of 24 foreign agents, finalized the plan for the massacre. Awami League leaders Jahangir Kabir Nanak, Mirza Azam, Harun Ur Rashid (also known as Leather Liton), and Torab Ali were present at several meetings to implement the plan. Colonel Shams Chowdhury, Commanding Officer of 44 Rifles Battalion, was aware of these plans and Taposh was responsible for obtaining approval for the decision from the then Prime Minister Sheikh Hasina. The report claims that BDR personnel were first mobilized via covert recruitment shortly after the 2008 general election, then indoctrinated and financially incentivized to carry out the violence at Pilkhana.

The report also claimed that, after the mutiny began, Captain Tanvir Haider Noor informed his wife about the presence of Indian National Security Guard members in Pilkhana. His wife, Tasnuva Maha, said that she heard three men dressed in BDR uniforms talking with each other in Hindi. Multiple witnesses reported hearing conversations in Hindi, Western Bengali dialect, and unknown languages in Pilkhana that day. The commission cited various facts in the report, including hearing foreign languages, the escape of outsiders, foreign numbers in the call list, and Captain Tanvir's last conversation, as evidence of India's involvement.

=== Asylum for Sheikh Hasina and Awami League leaders ===
Sheikh Hasina and Awami League leaders received asylum in India post-1975 Mujib assassination (1975–1981) and after the 2024 uprising. Critics see repeated refuge as evidence of Indian influence, enabling political organization from India. Supporters view it as humanitarian, tied to 1971 support.

After the 15 August 1975, military coup killed Mujibur Rahman and most of Hasina's family, she fled from West Germany to India, where Prime Minister Indira Gandhi provided shelter, security, and housing in Delhi's Pandara Road and Lajpat Nagar under assumed identities. Hasina, her husband MA Wazed Miah, sister Sheikh Rehana, and children lived there incognito for six years (1975–1981), allowing her to regroup politically amid Bangladesh's military rule.

Hasina fled to India on 5 August 2024, amid violent protests, marking India's third instance of sheltering her during crises (including brief 1979 refuge). She resides in New Delhi, hosting Awami League exiles, which enables continued political organization despite Bangladesh's demands for extradition.

Critics, including BNP and nationalists, view the repeated asylum as proof of Indian influence, allowing Hasina to plot comebacks and influence Dhaka remotely. Supporters frame it as humanitarian aid, rooted in India's 1971 Liberation War support and familial ties from Mujib's era.

=== Border killings ===
Deaths of Bangladeshi citizens on the Indo-Bangladesh border became one of the embarrassments between the two nations' bilateral relations in recent years. Bangladesh protests yield diplomatic notes but no systemic change, seen as India's assertion of border dominance. The so-called "shoot-to-kill" policy by India's Border Security Forces (BSF), which, according to Human Rights Watch, killed nearly 1,000 Bangladeshis between 2001 and 2011, has remained at the core of the talks between Bangladeshi and Indian officials visiting each other. Indian officials visiting Bangladesh, including the Indian foreign ministers, and BSF chiefs numerously vowed to stop BSF shootings, but Bangladeshi nationals, comprising mostly illicit border crossers, have continued to be shot dead by the Indian troops.

While anger grew in Bangladesh because of the continued BSF shootings and subsequent deaths, Indian officials argue that heightened security has followed the increasing flow of illegal migrations into India as well as continued misuse of the border by illicit traders. Indian officials, vowing to cut down the number of casualties at the border, showed statistics that the number of Bangladeshi deaths was in a steady decline in recent years. The Bangladeshi deaths caused by BSF shootings at the border became subject to a so-called cyber war between the hackers of the two countries that took the websites of BSF, National Informatics Centre and Trinamool Congress as victims. The government of Bangladesh was found to comment on the issue, condemning the cyber attacks on Indian websites.

The Bangladesh side has also been found to have indulged in violations of the border between the two countries. One such incident was the 2001 Invasion of the Padua or Pyrdiwah Village. Between 16 and 19 April 2001, Bangladesh Rifles (BDR) intruded into Pyriduwah, Meghalaya, triggering border tensions. Heavy firing followed in Boraibari, Assam, on 17–18 April, during which 16 BSF personnel went missing. India engaged through BSF and diplomatic channels, demanding an end to hostilities, BDR withdrawal, and restoration of the status quo, which, according to India's Ministry of External Affairs, was completed by 19 April. When the bodies of the 16 missing personnel were returned on 20 April, some of them showed signs of mutilation, with eight soldiers shot at point-blank range "through the eyes". The incident raised grave concerns over violations of international norms and human rights. In photographs circulated in the media, some Bangladeshi villagers could be seen carrying the body of one of the victims of the killings dangling by his hands and feet from a bamboo pole "like a dead tiger". The unprovoked intrusion and the inhumane treatment and killing of the soldiers were condemned by India. The soldiers did not die during skirmishes but were killed after the fighting ended, as evident in the case of Deputy Commander Mandal, where rigor mortis was just setting in after his corpse was returned, indicating death within a period of 24 hours.

Attempts have been made to reduce killings on the border. BSF brought about a policy change to minimize fatalities in shooting incidents involving trespassers and pledged the use of non-lethal weaponry that may not kill hostiles at a safe distance and may only cause fatalities should the hostile actors get too close with the intent to kill.

=== Diplomatic incidents ===
In November 2015, Bangladeshi Commerce Minister Tofail Ahmed was critical of India's 2015 Nepal blockade, stating that "blockades hit at agreements like the BBIN".

==== 2024 attack on the Bangladesh Assistant High Commission in India ====
In late November 2024, several reports of desecration of Indian flags and ISKON emblems emerged. The incidents reportedly took place at the Bangladesh University of Engineering and Technology, Bogra Government Polytechnic Institute, Dhaka University, and Noakhali Science and Technology University.

On 2 December 2024, members of the Hindu Sangharsh Samity attacked the Bangladesh Assistant High Commission in Agartala, Tripura. They entered the premises and "took down the Bangladesh flag, set it on fire, and caused some vandalism inside the building". India's External Affairs Ministry expressed regret over the incident in Tripura's capital, and assured Bangladesh that it was "stepping up security arrangements" at Bangladesh missions in India. On 3 December 2024, the Indian police also made seven arrests related to the incident, which was described by India's foreign ministry as "extremely regrettable".

=== Political interference ===
Critics and opposition groups in Bangladesh allege that India has supported governments aligned with its geopolitical interests, particularly the Awami League (AL) under Sheikh Hasina, across multiple national elections since 2008, including those held in 2008, 2014, 2018, and 2024. These allegations—raised by parties such as the BNP, nationalist groups, and political analysts—include claims of diplomatic backing, intelligence involvement, and policy concessions such as transit facilities in exchange for political alignment. Indian authorities have consistently denied any interference in Bangladesh’s internal affairs, maintaining that bilateral relations are based on mutual sovereignty and non-intervention.

India provided refuge to Hasina after the 1975 Mujib assassination and supported her 1981 return, viewing AL as a bulwark against Islamist or so-called Pakistan-aligned forces. In 2008, New Delhi backed Hasina's landslide win amid caretaker government controversies, seeing it as stabilizing bilateral ties post-BNP rule. This pattern continued, with India shielding AL from international scrutiny during BNP boycotts.

The 2014 polls, boycotted by BNP, saw India endorse Hasina despite violence and rigging claims, prioritizing her anti-China, anti-Pakistan stance over democratic concerns. Similarly in 2018, amid opposition arrests, Indian diplomats met AL leaders, allegedly coordinating to counter BNP-Jamaat alliances. Transit deals and border fencing concessions followed, interpreted as rewards for alignment.

India's high-level visits and statements ahead of the January 2024 vote fueled "India Out" protests, accusing RAW of rigging via election officials and suppressing BNP. Post-election charges against commissioners highlighted foreign influence claims, with India resisting US calls for fairness. Hasina's ouster in August 2024 uprising intensified narratives of Indian orchestration of her prior dominance. Critics cite diplomatic pressure, intelligence sharing (e.g., RAW-DGFI ties), economic levers like Teesta delays and transit fees, and media narratives portraying BNP as extremist. #IndiaOut highlighted Indian apparel imports and Adani deals as economic coercion. Allegations extend to covert election funding and voter suppression favoring AL.

India views Bangladesh as a buffer against China-Pakistan encirclement, backing AL to secure transit to northeast states and counter Islamist militancy. This contrasts with BNP's perceived Pakistan tilt, making AL the preferred partner despite human rights issues. New Delhi consistently denies meddling, framing support as mutual security cooperation and economic partnership, respecting Dhaka's sovereign choices. Officials stress non-interference while celebrating ties with elected governments.

=== Defending Awami League government from the international pressure ===
India allegedly shielded Awami League from Western criticism on elections and rights, using stability arguments for Northeast security. It employs 'sticks and carrots' on strategic issues like discouraging Chinese investments.

=== Influence on foreign policy ===
India significantly shapes Bangladesh's foreign policy, often prioritizing its own strategic interests, such as curbing Dhaka's ties with China and Pakistan. New Delhi views closer Bangladesh-China-Pakistan engagements as a potential encirclement threat and pressures Dhaka to limit them.

India expresses concerns over Bangladesh's diplomatic meetings with China and Pakistan, like those in Kunming, fearing a South Asian axis excluding it. Despite Bangladesh's non-aligned assurances, New Delhi remains wary amid shifting regional geopolitics. Recent analyses highlight India's fears of Islamist influences and enhanced Beijing-Islamabad sway in Dhaka.

Bangladesh maintains balanced relations but faces Indian apprehensions that influence its policy choices toward neighbors. This dynamic persists despite Dhaka's efforts to diversify partnerships without joining any anti-India bloc.

=== Teen Bigha Corridor ===
There have also been disputes regarding the transfer of the Teen Bigha Corridor to Bangladesh. Part of Bangladesh is surrounded by the Indian state of West Bengal. On 26 June 1992, India leased three bigha of land to Bangladesh to connect this enclave with mainland Bangladesh. There was a dispute regarding the indefinite nature of the lease. The dispute was resolved by a mutual agreement between India and Bangladesh in 2011.

=== Terrorism ===
Terrorist activities targeting India are carried out by certain terror outfits based in Bangladesh, like Ansarullah Bangla Team affiliated to Al-Qaeda and Harkat-ul-Jihad-al-Islami. India demands Bangladesh crack down on northeastern insurgents like United Liberation Front of Assam (ULFA) hiding in border areas, extraditing leaders such as Anup Chetia in 2015 despite local legal hurdles. This involves intelligence sharing and operations that prioritize India's security over Bangladesh's sovereignty, with accusations of RAW involvement in domestic surveillance. Critics argue it forces unilateral cooperation, limiting Bangladesh's independent counter-terror policy.

=== Illegal migration ===
Illegal Bangladeshi immigration into India has also been a major area of contention in the relations. The border is porous, and migrants are able to cross illegally, though sometimes only in return for financial or other incentives to border security personnel. Bangladeshi officials have denied the existence of Bangladeshis living in India, and those illegal migrants found are described as having been trafficked. This has considerable repercussions for those involved, as they are stigmatized for having been involved in prostitution, whether or not this has actually been the case. Cross-border migrants are also at far higher risk of HIV/AIDS infection.

As of 2026, officially more than 2,862 cases of nationality verification were pending in Bangladesh, while the Indian side also urged Bangladesh to cooperate on the repatriation of illegal immigrants.

=== Cyberattacks ===
Bangladeshi cyberattacks on India largely took the form of hacktivist activity by Mysterious Team Bangladesh, a group founded in 2020 that gained international attention in 2022. Since mid-2023, the group has carried out more than 750 DDoS attacks and over 70 website defacements, with about 34 percent of its targets located in India, primarily aimed at disrupting websites and spreading political or ideological messages.

India-based hacktivist group Trojan 1337, known for politically motivated cyberattacks against nations with strained relations with India, too gained attention. Active since 2023, the group has targeted Bangladesh and Pakistan, defacing government and educational institution websites, notably on India's Independence Day (15 August) in 2023 and 2025, including attacks on Savar Union Parishad, Rohitpur Union Parishad, and several schools like Rupnagar Government Secondary School. The actions included data breaches such as the National Board of Revenue (NBR) breach and a Dhaka WASA Scada was hacked.

=== Others ===
Both Bangladesh and India made claims over the same seawater at the Bay of Bengal before the settlement of the issue.

There was a minor hiccup in the relations of the two nations when Indian Prime Minister Dr. Manmohan Singh claimed that "25% of Bangladeshis are anti-Indian", during an informal press meet.

In 2019, despite Bangladesh's efforts, Bangladeshi media claimed increased anxiety among a section of people with anti-India sentiments while a sudden rise in illegal border-crossing was observed after the Citizenship Amendment Act. Several Bangladeshi ministers cancelled their scheduled state visits to India as a response to India's Citizenship Amendment Bill.

=== Protests against Indian influence ===
Anti-Indian sentiment in Bangladesh has roots in post-independence dynamics, evolving into organized movements against perceived hegemony after 1971. These efforts often stem from grievances over economic disparities, border issues, political interference, and cultural dominance. While not always formalized as a single "movement", key episodes reflect resistance to Indian influence.

In 2021, violent protests in Bangladesh against the state visit by Indian PM Narendra Modi to the country led to the deaths of at least 14 people. The protesters, mostly from the Hefazat-e-Islam, also attacked Hindu temples and a train in eastern Bangladesh.

== Cultural relations ==
=== Sports ===
Bangladesh and India have been major cricket-playing nations since the colonial era. Bangladesh got full membership at the International Cricket Council in 2000 with India's help. The two countries also share kabaddi as a traditional heritage, with India's Pro Kabaddi League helping to grow the game in Bangladesh.

== See also ==
- 2015–16 Nepal blockade
- Akhand Bharat
- Anti-India sentiment
- Bangladesh–Pakistan relations
- Bangladesh–India border
- Eastern South Asia
- Foreign policy of India
- Foreign relations of Bangladesh
- Foreign relations of India
- Indian Century
- Bangladesh's relations with Northeast India
- South Asian Association for Regional Cooperation (SAARC)
