= Joint River Commission =

Bilateral working group

The 'Joint River Commission was a bilateral working group established by India and Bangladesh in the Indo-Bangla Treaty of Friendship, Cooperation, and Peace that was signed on March 19, 1972, and came into being in November 1972. As per the treaty, the two nations established the commission to work for the common interests and sharing of water resources, irrigation, floods, and cyclones control. The studies and reports of the commission contributed directly to the efforts of both nations to resolve the dispute over the Sharing of Ganges Waters, facilitating bilateral agreements in 1975, 1978, and finally in 1996.

== See also ==
- List of Bangladesh-India transboundary rivers
