= Ganges water dispute =

Sharing of the Ganges' waters between India and Bangladesh

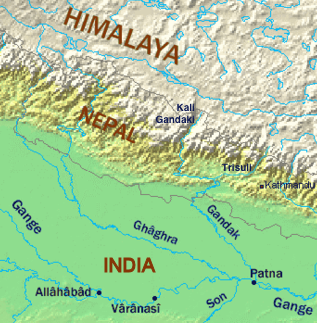
Map of the Ganges River from its origin in northern India to its entry into the Bay of Bengal through Bangladesh.

A long-standing dispute exists between India and Bangladesh over the appropriate allocation, and development, of the water resources of the Ganges River, which flows from northern India into Bangladesh. The issue had remained a subject of conflict for almost 35 years, with several bilateral agreements and rounds of talks failing to produce results.

However, a comprehensive bilateral treaty was signed by Indian Prime Minister H. D. Deve Gowda and Bangladeshi Prime Minister Sheikh Hasina Wajed on 12 December 1996 in the Indian capital New Delhi. The treaty established a 30-year water-sharing arrangement and recognised Bangladesh's rights as a lower-level riparian.

== Background ==
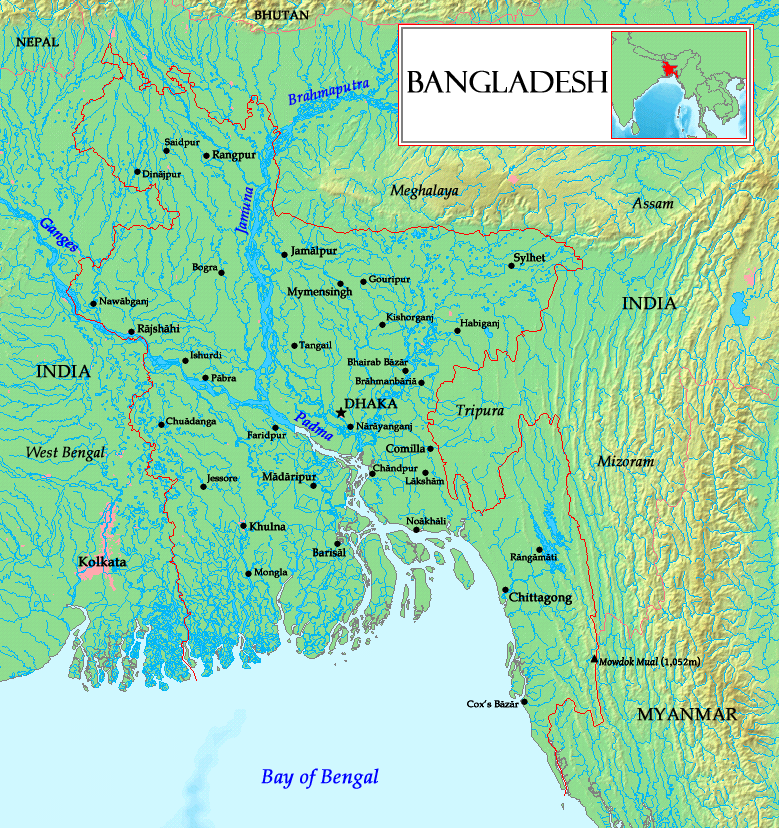
A map showing major rivers in Bangladesh, including the Padma River.

Descending from India's northern plains, the Ganges River forms a boundary of 129-kilometre boundary between India and Bangladesh and flows for another 113 kilometres inside Bangladesh. At Pakaur in India, the river begins its attrition with the branching away of its first distributary, the Bhagirathi River, which goes on to form the Hooghly River. About 10 kilometres from the border with Bangladesh the Farakka Barrage, built in 1974, controls the flow of the Ganges, diverting some of the water into a feeder canal linking the Hooghly to keep it relatively silt-free.

After entering Bangladesh, the main branch of the Ganges is known as the Padma River until it is joined by the Jamuna River, the largest distributary of the Brahmaputra River, which descends from Assam and Northeast India. Further downstream, the Ganges is joined by the Meghna River, the second-largest distributary of the Brahmaputra, and adopts the Meghna's name as it enters the Meghna estuary. Fanning out into the 350 km wide Ganges Delta, it finally empties into the Bay of Bengal. A total of 54 rivers flow into Bangladesh from India.

== Efforts at resolution ==
Indian Prime Minister Indira Gandhi and Bangladesh's founding leader Sheikh Mujibur Rahman signed the wide-ranging Indo-Bangladeshi Treaty of Friendship, Cooperation and Peace on 19 March 1972; as per the treaty, the two nations established a Joint River Commission to work for the common interests and sharing of water resources, irrigation, floods and cyclones control.

== Farakka Barrage ==
The Farakka Barrage is a dam on the Ganga River located in the Indian state of West Bengal, roughly 10 km (6.2 mi) from the border with Bangladesh. India uses it to control the flow of the Ganges River. The dam was built to divert Ganges River water into the Hooghly River during the dry season, from January to June, to flush out the accumulating silt which in the 1950s and 1960s was a problem at Kolkata Port on the Hooghly River. Bangladesh has determined that its rivers were drying up because of excess drawing of water by India. In May 1974 a joint declaration was issued to resolve the water–sharing issue before the Farakka Barrage began operation. This was followed by an interim agreement in 1975 to allow India to operate the feeder canals of the Barrage for short periods.

However, India withdrew from the process of negotiations by September 1976 as both nations grew apart after the assassination of Sheikh Mujibur Rahman, the President of Bangladesh, in August 1975 during a military coup d'état, and the related establishment of military rule in Bangladesh. Bangladesh protested India's unilateral action at a summit of the Non-Aligned Movement (NAM), and at the 31st session of the United Nations General Assembly. At the urging of other nations and the U.N., both India and Bangladesh agreed to resume dialogue, but with no results.

=== Temporary agreements ===
Bilateral relations had improved in 1977 during the governments of the then-Prime Minister Morarji Desai of India and the then-President Ziaur Rahman of Bangladesh; in 1977 both leaders signed a 5-year treaty on water-sharing, but this expired in 1982 without being renewed.

Bangladesh attempted to internationalise the affair by lobbying the U.N. General Assembly and the South Asian Association for Regional Cooperation (SAARC) without any result.

== 1996 Treaty ==
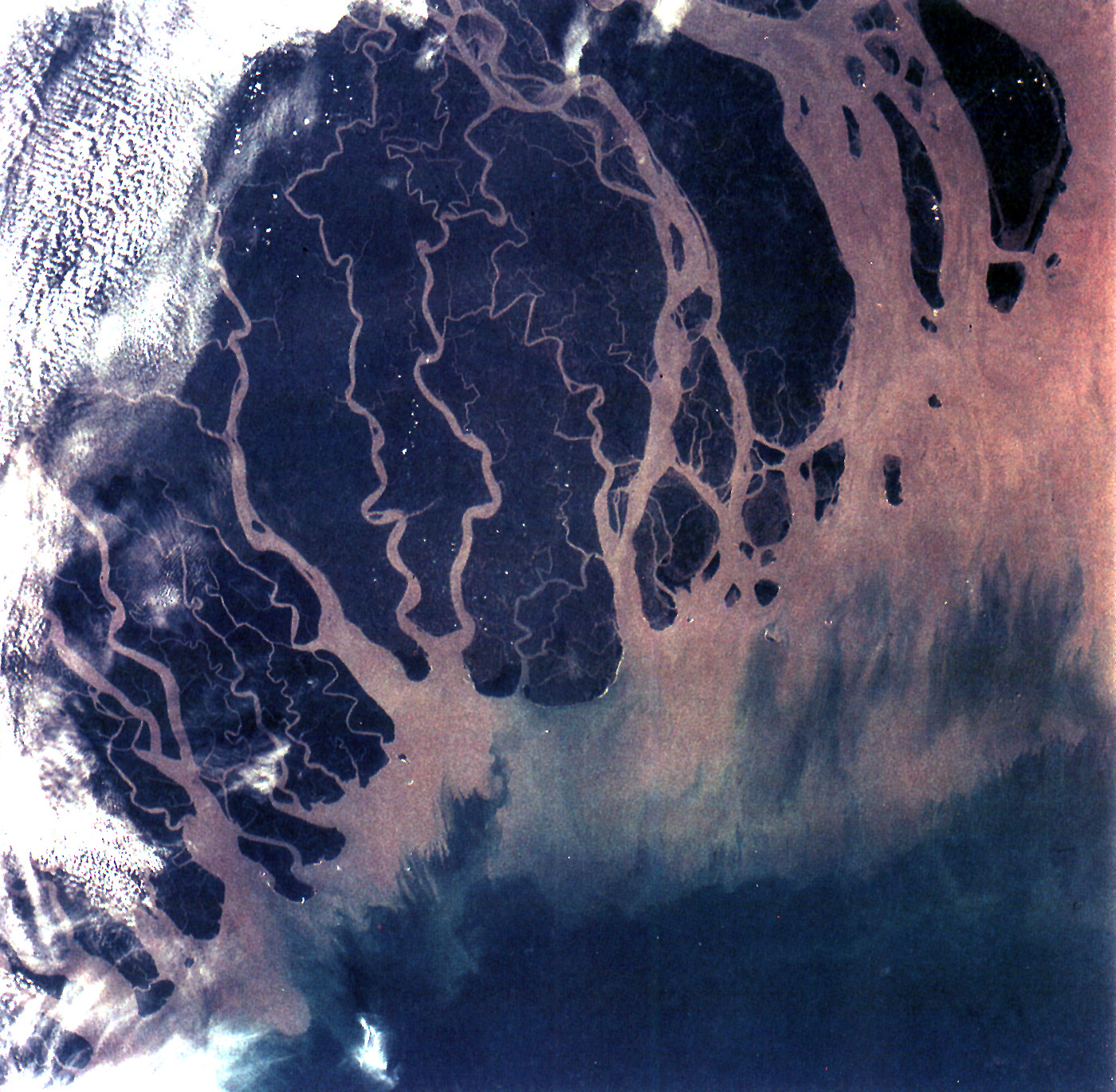
The Ganges Delta spanning India and Bangladesh.

The formation of an Awami League government in 1996 under Sheikh Hasina Wajed, the daughter of Sheikh Mujib, led to a fresh thaw in relations and negotiations restarted. Both countries leaders met in the Indian capital on 12 December 1996 and signed a 30-year, comprehensive treaty.

As per the 1996 treaty for sharing the Ganges waters at Farakka, the division is as follows:

Availability at Farakka	Share of India	Share of Bangladesh
70,000 cusecs or less	50%	50%
70,000 – 75,000 cusecs	Balance of the flow	35,000 cusecs
75,000 cusecs or more	40,000 cusecs	Balance of the flow

Both nations were able to co-operate in harnessing the water resources; the treaty also permits the construction of barrages and irrigation projects in Kushtia and the Gorai-Madhumati River in Bangladesh, draining the south-western districts and thus preserving the environment, natural and economic resources.

== Assessment ==
The 1996 treaty established a long-term solution and considerably eased strains in Indo-Bangladeshi relations. The 1996 treaty has been attacked by the Awami League's (AL) main rival, the Bangladesh Nationalist Party (BNP), which is regarded as hostile to India, but BNP did not renege from the treaty when it came to power in 2001. The BNP and other Bangladeshi political factions allege that India is drawing excessive water and the amount allocated to Bangladesh is unjust and insufficient. India in turn complains that the water allocated to Bangladesh leaves it with less water than necessary for the functioning of Kolkata Port and the National Thermal Power Corporation in Farakka.

Other critics have also stressed environmental reasons for India to reconsider its drawing of water at Farraka. Alarming increases in deforestation and erosion at the upper levels of the Ganges River increases the deposition of silt at the lower level, which is already measured at 2 million tonnes annually, along with increased salinity, have led to desertification. In Bangladesh, the diversion has raised salinity levels, contaminated fisheries, hindered navigation and posed a threat to water quality and public health. Such silt levels are believed to be adversely affecting the Hooghly River and Kolkata Port.

== Future cooperation ==
The flood waters from Ganga, Brahmaputra, and Meghana rivers joining the Sea can be harnessed by constructing a coastal reservoir to mitigate climate change effects on both Bangladesh and India and also for achieving water security, food security, and energy security.
