= 2001 Bangladesh–India border skirmishes =

Series of armed skirmishes between Bangladesh and India

- Map showing the locations of India and Bangladesh (highlighted in green and orange, respectively)
Date	16–20 April 2001 (4 days)
Location	Bangladesh–India border (Gowainghat, Sylhet/East Khasi Hills, Meghalaya, Boraibari, Kurigram)
Result	Inconclusive (See Aftermath section)
Territorial changes	Status quo ante bellum

Belligerents
Bangladesh	India

Commanders and leaders
A. L. M. Fazlur Rahman	Gurbachan Singh Jagat

Units involved
Bangladesh Rifles	Border Security Force

Strength
700–1,000 troops	300+ troops

Casualties and losses
3 killed; 5 wounded	16 killed; 2 wounded; 2 captured
- 24 civilians injured around 10,000 civilians temporarily displaced

In April 2001, Bangladesh and India engaged in a series of armed clashes along the international border between the two countries. The clashes took place between troops of the Bangladesh Rifles (BDR) and the Indian Border Security Force (BSF) on the poorly-marked border.

The clashes began on 16 April 2001, when a force of around 800 to a 1000 Bangladeshi Paramilitary soldiers attacked and captured Padua/Pyrdiwah village, breaking the status quo and forcing the civilians there to flee. Bangladesh claimed that the village had been illegally occupied by India since Bangladesh's War of Independence in 1971. The Indian Border Security Force (BSF) post in Padua/Pyrdiwah village was encircled, trapping 31 BSF troops within. However, both sides held their fire and began negotiations. Over the course of the following days, about three BSF companies proceeded to reinforce the outpost. This incident was resolved later without any bloodshed.

Following this standoff, Indian BSF paramilitary troops along the border were put on high alert and ordered to begin intensive patrolling. A few days later, a small contingent of 300 BSF troops entered Bangladeshi territory of Kurigram near the village of Boraibari, more than 200 km to the west of Padua/Pyrdiwah. Immediately upon entering Bangladeshi territory, the BSF paramilitary company was ambushed by Bangladeshi border guards and the attack on BDR outposts in Boraibari was repulsed. Following their capture, the bodies of the Indian soldiers were returned to India on 20 April. India reported that BSF soldiers showed signs of mutilation, were shot point blank and had torture marks on their bodies.

The clashes finally ended on 21 April 2001, after both sides agreed to a ceasefire. Later on, respective governments also engaged in bilateral negotiations and normalized their relations. The clashes left a total of 21 people dead, including 16 Indian soldiers and three Bangladeshi border guards. The clashes resulted in a rise of nationalism in Bangladesh. It was the first major military confrontation between the two nations since 1971.

== Background ==
The Partition of Bengal in 1947 left a poorly demarcated international border between the states of India and Bangladesh (erstwhile East Pakistan). Ownership of several villages on both sides of the de facto border were disputed and claimed by both countries. The dispute over the demarcation of the India–Bangladesh border worsened due to the existence of over 190 enclaves.

== Cause ==
One of the disputed areas was a small sliver of land near the village of Padua (also known as Pyrdiwah), on the border between Bangladesh and the Indian state of Meghalaya, which was used by Indian security forces during the 1971 Bangladesh War to train ethnic Bengali guerrillas, who were fighting the Pakistan Army and pro-Pakistan loyalist militias. Following its independence, Bangladesh staked its claim to the area which India's Border Security Force (BSF) had established a post in since 1971. The village is one of the Indian exclaves on the border between Bangladesh and Meghalaya. There are 111 Indian enclaves in Bangladeshi-claimed territory and 50 Bangladeshi enclaves in Indian-claimed territory. Padua village is an adverse possession—a village inhabited by Indians that is legally owned by Bangladesh (until the border agreement is ratified and the populations exchanged). The people of this village are ethnic Khasis.

In an interview published much later, the then-director of the Bangladesh Rifles (BDR), Major-General Fazlur Rahman, who was later dismissed from service by the rival government following an election, claimed that the Indian BSF had begun to construct a linking road between their camp in Padua and another camp 10 km (6.2 mi) away through no man's land and Bangladeshi territory.

== Conflict ==
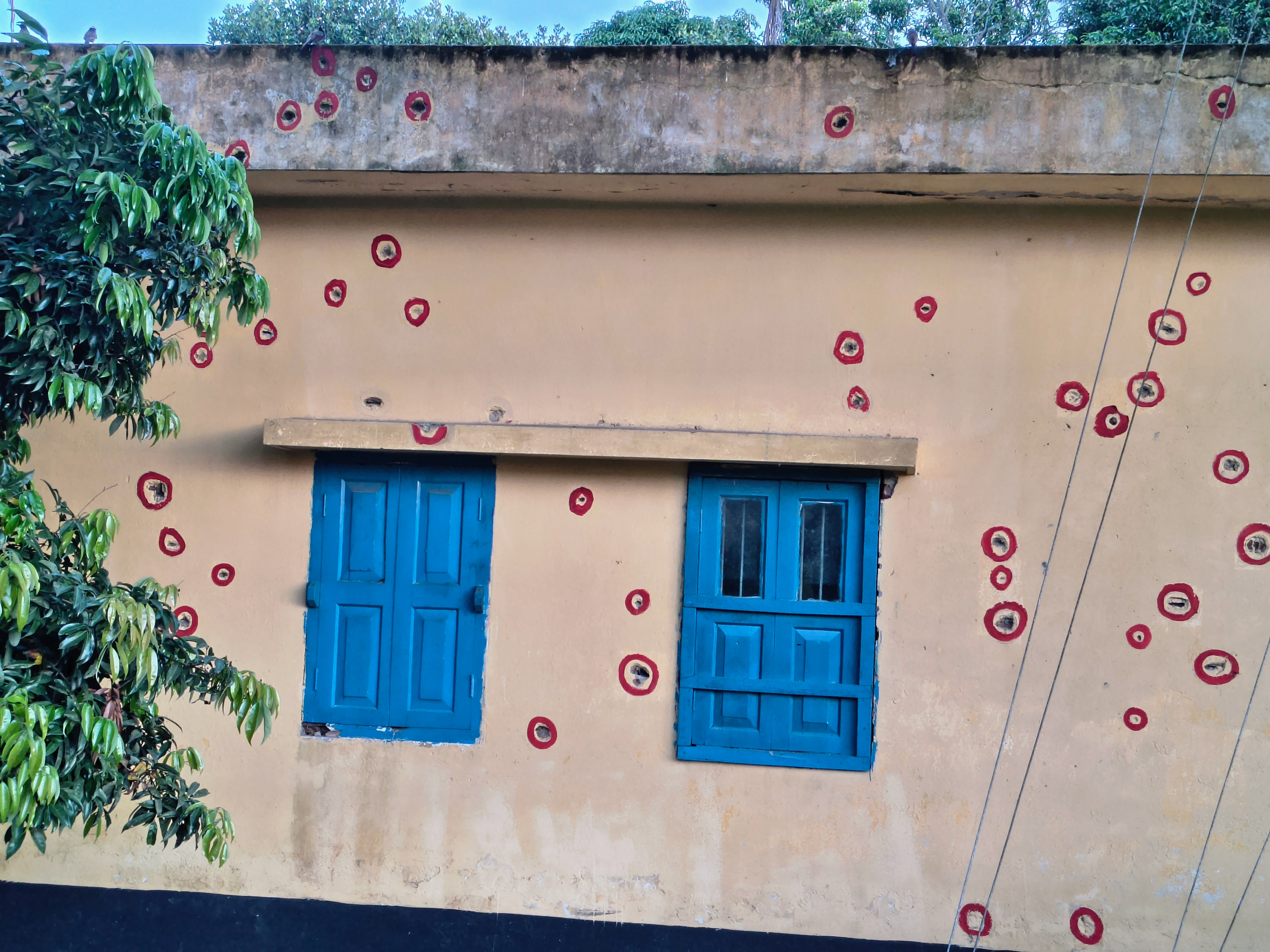
Bullet marks of the BSF at the Boraibari camp in Bangladesh

The fighting that took place during these clashes was the worst since Bangladesh's war with Pakistan in 1971. It took place around the village of Padua in the Indian state of Meghalaya which adjoins the Tamabil area of the Bangladeshi border in the Sylhet district. Although an effective status quo had been maintained in this area, around 6.5 km (4.0 mi) of the border had been disputed for the past 30 years.

On 16 April 2001, a force of around 1000 Bangladeshi paramilitaries attacked and captured Padua village, breaking the status quo and forcing the civilians there to flee. Bangladesh claimed that the village had been illegally occupied by India since Bangladesh's War of independence in 1971. The Indian Border Security Force (BSF) post in Padua village was surrounded, trapping several BSF troops within. However, both sides held their fire and began negotiations. Over the course of the following days, about three BSF companies proceeded to reinforce the outpost. This incident was resolved later without any bloodshed.

Following this standoff, BSF troops along the Indian–Bangladeshi border were put on high alert and ordered to begin intensive patrolling. A few days later, a small contingent of BSF troops entered Bangladeshi territory near the village of Boraibari, more than 200 km (120 mi) to the west of Padua. Unlike the latter village, which is an adverse possession, Boroibari is an area lying across a fence well inside Bangladesh. The intrusion was used as a "counter-attack" by India to retaliate after the earlier incident in Padua. According to Bangladeshi sources, Indian forces launched an early-morning attack on their posts in the frontier district of Kurigram, which lies on the border with the Indian state of Assam.

Immediately upon entering Bangladeshi territory, 16 Indian paramilitary personnel were ambushed and killed by Bangladeshi border guards, who were assisted by hundreds of villagers. Around midnight, the Foreign Secretary of India, Chokila Iyer, received a call from her Bangladeshi counterpart, Syed Muazzem Ali, saying that orders had been issued to restore the status quo as well as for an immediate Bangladeshi withdrawal from Padua. The Bangladesh Rifles (BDR) withdrew from Padua by the night of 19 April.

In the confrontation, 16 Indian border guards were killed while two suffered injuries. The attack also left three Bangladeshi border guards dead and another five wounded. About 10,000 civilians fled the area after some 24 were wounded in the cross-border clashes.

After the Boroibari intrusion on 18 April, India alleged that the BDR started firing 3-inch and 8-inch mortar shells on Mankachar village, which is another disputed Indian enclave.

== Aftermath ==
After both governments intervened in the situation, the Bangladeshis and Indians returned to their original positions and restored the previous status quo. Fresh clashes erupted along the India–Bangladesh border just hours after both sides voiced regret and concern over the recent killings, but by midnight on 20 April, cross-border firing had stopped. An article reported that 6,000 Indian civilians had fled the region, and Indian government officials were attempting to convince the displaced villagers to return to their homes. Three Bangladeshi soldiers were killed; two during combat and one died of wounds. Bangladesh later agreed to return the bodies of 16 Indian soldiers the next day. Upon examining the bodies of the dead personnel, India said that some had been mutilated and shot at a close range. India's home secretary, Kamal Pande, said eight of the men had been shot at point-blank range and called it "a brutal act of murder", and foreign minister Jaswant Singh told Parliament that India had lodged a strong protest over the men's inhuman treatments. Bangladesh's foreign ministry said Prime Minister Hasina had told Prime Minister Vajpayee that troops fired in self-defence. She expressed grief but did not apologise or admit any wrongdoing.

The Prime Minister of Bangladesh Sheikh Hasina and Prime Minister of India Atal Bihari Vajpayee engaged in telephonic discussions and subsequently agreed to order a high-level investigation into the incident. Indian Foreign Ministry spokesman Raminder Singh Jassal reported that both India and Bangladesh would improve bilateral diplomatic channels and promised to exercise restraint in the future. India and Bangladesh initiated talks to resolve their border disputes in March 2002. By July 2002, the two sides established joint-working groups to agree on and establish the non-demarcated sections of the border.

The Government of Bangladesh denied allegations that it had supported the BDR's initialization of hostilities with India and termed the incident as the "adventurism of its local commanders". However, Bangladesh ordered no courts-martial, suspensions, or transfers of any local military commanders.

The end of the brief conflict saw an upsurge of nationalism in Bangladesh. Observers have termed the incident as a political ploy to rouse nationalistic passions before the Bangladeshi elections (which were 2 months away at the time of the incident) and as malicious adventurism by the Bangladesh Rifles (BDR). In parliamentary elections, the four-party right-wing alliance led by the Bangladesh Nationalist Party and Jamaat-e-Islami Bangladesh won the majority.

This was the first armed engagement between India and Bangladesh, two neighbouring states that had otherwise maintained friendly relations since Bangladesh's independence from Pakistan in 1971. Both sides desisted from any further hostilities and began border talks to discuss disputes along their 4,000 km (2,500 mi) border. The two states experienced a thaw in their diplomatic relations shortly afterwards. India has since completed the construction of a barrier along the entire length of its international border with Bangladesh. Bangladesh has protested the construction of the barrier, claiming that the construction of a fence within 150 yards of the international border was a gross violation of the Indo-Bangladeshi Treaty of Friendship, Cooperation and Peace. The Bangladeshi government also protested the alleged frequent Indian BSF incursions into Bangladesh, and cross-border firing that has resulted in the deaths of Bangladeshis inside Bangladeshi territory. In a news conference in August 2008, it was stated that 97 people had been killed (69 Bangladeshis, 28 Indians; rest unidentified) while trying to cross the border illegally in the prior six months.

== Legacy ==
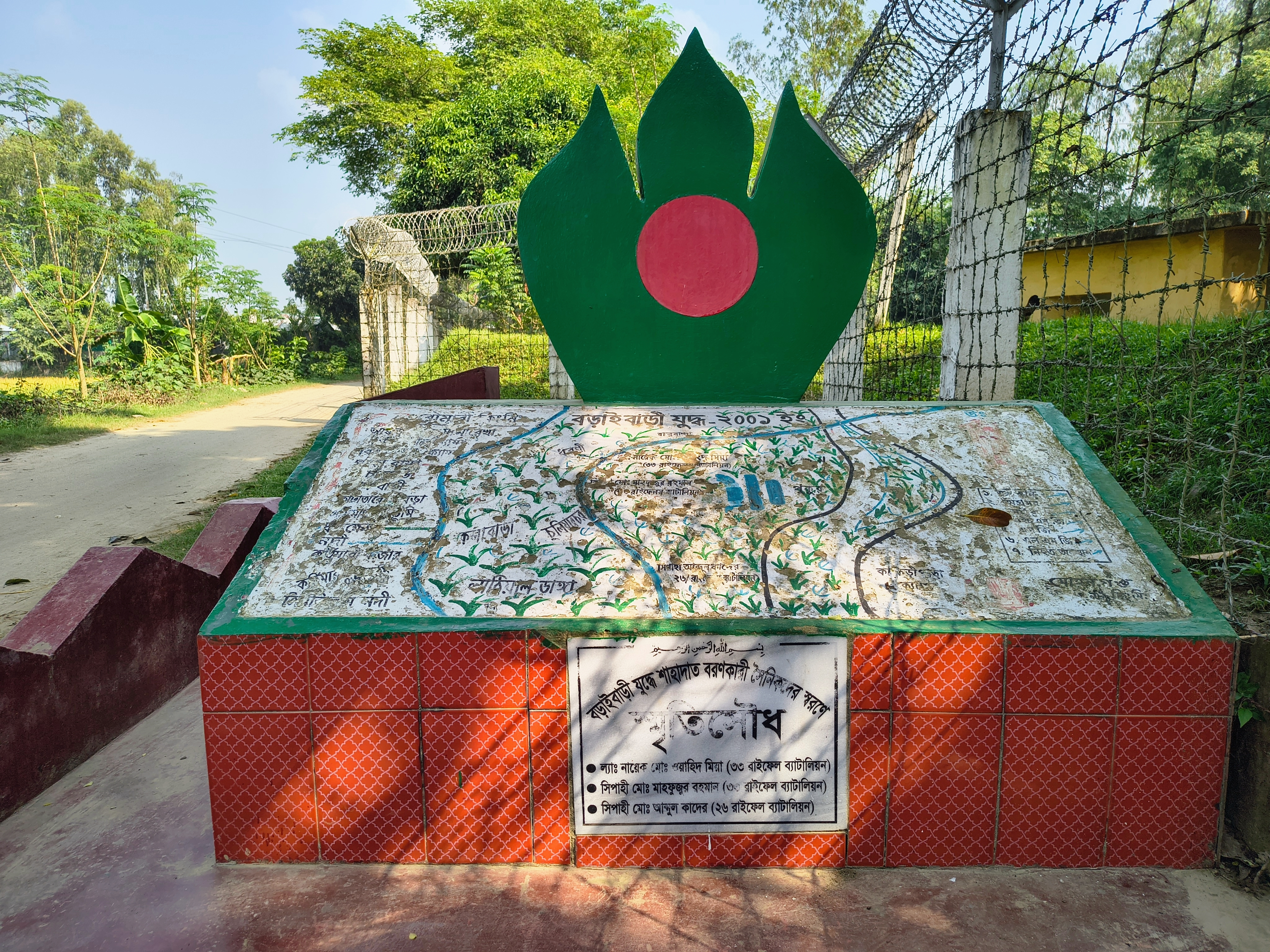
Memorial in remembrance of the Bangladeshi soldiers killed

A memorial was made in Boraibari to preserve the history in Bangladesh.

== See also ==
- Deaths along the Bangladesh–India border
- Bangladesh–India relations
- Bangladesh–India border
- 2019 Bangladesh-Indian border clash
- 1979 Bangladesh-Indian skirmishes
- Border Guard Bangladesh
- Border Security Force
