= Deaths along the Bangladesh–India border =

Deaths along the Bangladesh–India border occur many times a year as a result of people allegedly attempting to illegally cross or walk along the border, cross-border firing and suspected cattle smuggling. Bangladesh and India share a 4,096 km (2,545 mi) border. Human Rights Watch and Bangladeshi advocacy groups say the Indian Border Security Force (BSF) which guards the border against smuggling and illegal crossing has used lethal force excessively, which they describe as "shoot on sight" policy. India says the BSF personnel are instructed to use non-lethal force and to fire only in self-defence.

According to a report published by Human rights group Odhikar and Human Rights Watch, around 1,000 Bangladeshi civilians were killed by the Indian BSF in a period of 10 years (from 2001 to 2010). The report also states that Indian paramilitary forces routinely threaten, abuse, arbitrarily detain, and torture local Bangladeshi civilians living along the border, and Bangladeshi border guards usually do not help the Bangladeshi civilians.

== Illegal migration ==
=== Bangladesh claims against Border Security Force ===
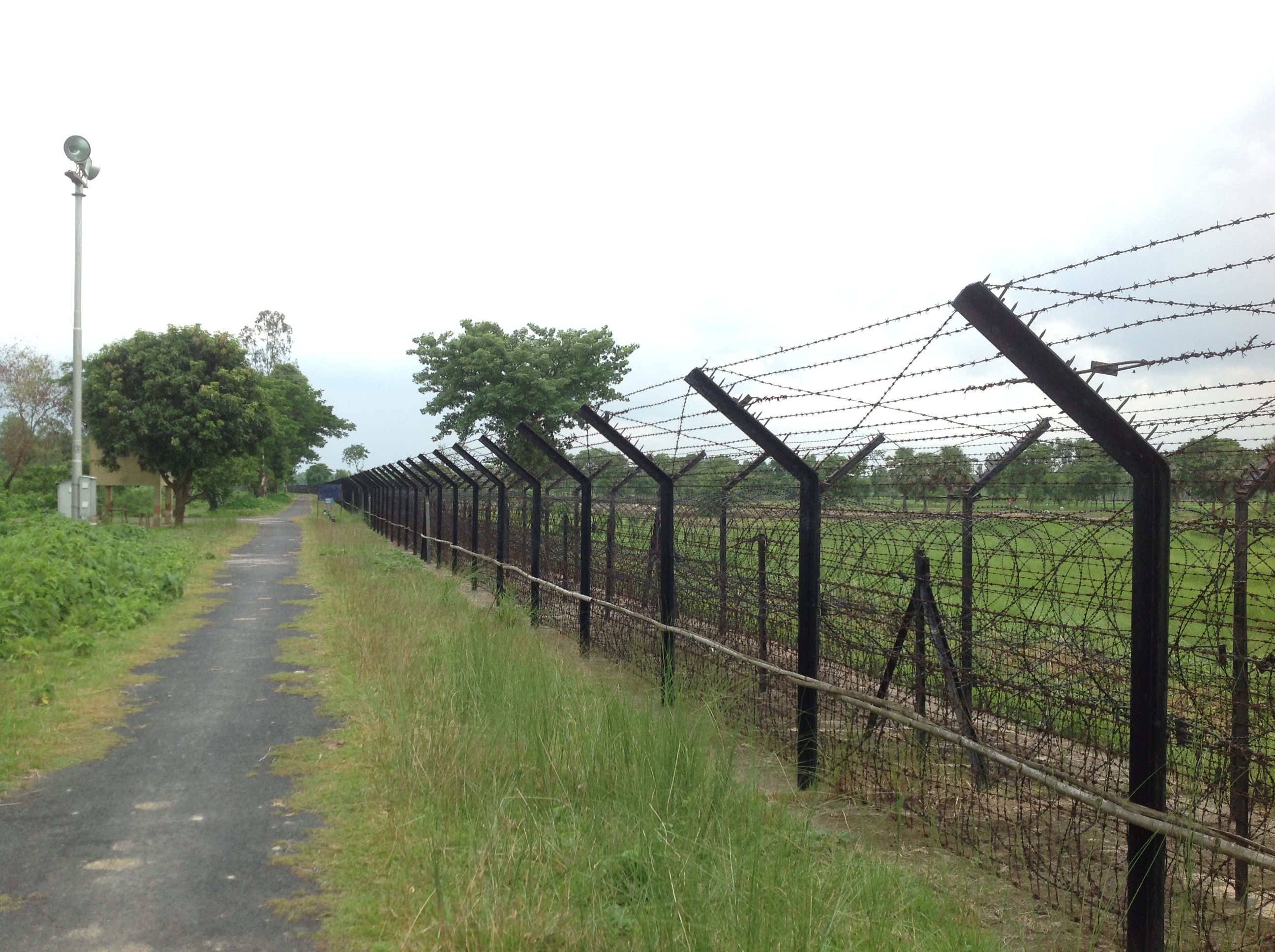
In some border areas, strong fences are installed by India

The Indian Border Security Force (BSF) exercises "shoot on sight" policy to stop illegal migration. The then-head of BSF, Raman Srivastava, stated that people should not feel sorry for the victims as they were trying to illegally enter into India, and therefore they are a legitimate target. Around 1,000 people, mostly Bangladeshi nationals, were killed by Indian border security forces over the period of 10 years (2001 to 2010). None of the Indian BSF personnel involved in killings along the border were ever prosecuted. A 2010 Human Rights Watch (HRW) report stated that BSF justified killing by claiming that it was an act of self-defence, or that the suspects were evading arrest. HRW said that the BSF reports it examined did not record any weapons recovered from the victims.

HRW said BSF personnel cannot be prosecuted without sanction by Indian government.

While speaking about border killings in a 2022 interview, India-based human rights activist Kiriti Roy from Manabadhikar Suraksha Mancha (MASUM) noted the existence of barbed wire fences in Indian territories that are within 150 yards from zero point ("no man's land"). He pointed out that per the Geneva Convention, defence infrastructure cannot be built within this 150-yard zone. In January 2025, BSF reportedly attempted to construct more barbed wire fences along the zero line in violation of the international law.

==== Killing of Felani Khatun ====
On 7 January 2011, a 15-year-old girl, Felani, was shot dead while illegally entering Bangladesh from India by the BSF in Phulbari Upazila, Kurigram. She had gotten stuck in the barbed wire when she was shot and she remained there for 5 hours until she bled to death. This resulted in protests in Bangladesh. In 2015, the National Human Rights Commission of India asked the Indian government to pay ₹500,000 as compensation to her family.

=== Indian claims against Border Guard Bangladesh ===
Some Indian nationals were also reported to have been killed by Border Guards Bangladesh (BGB) on suspicion of being smugglers. On 21 January 2012, Indian officials claimed that four BGB soldiers crossed into India and killed an Indian national. The soldiers were trying to drag the body of the Indian national when they were stopped by Indian locals who gathered at the site after hearing gunshots. The locals captured one BGB soldiers, while the other three BGB soldiers managed to flee. The Bangladeshi officials claim that the slain Indian national was a smuggler, however, Indian officials claim that the slain Indian national was just a farmer.

On 7 April 2015, Indian officials reported that BGB had crossed 10 kilometres into Indian territory and killed two Indian nationals. The body of one Indian national was taken back by Bangladesh. The incident created tensions between BSF and BGB. The Bangladeshi officials claimed that the killed Indian nationals were smugglers.

On 24 September 2024, the BGB detained a BSF personnel for reportedly crossing into the Bangladesh through the boundary near pillar number 334/sub-pillar 6. The personnel was found in uniform but unarmed, and the Bangladeshi officials were preparing to return the detained member to the Indian authorities through a flag meeting. However, Indian media later reported that the BSF made a strong protest to the BGB in its response and that they considered this an "abduction" of one of its soldiers. The personnel was returned later in the day following a flag meeting. Same incident again occurred on 22 December 2025, where Bangladesh BGB personnel captured an Indian BSF member allegedly stepping inside Bangladesh. He was later released and given to BSF after a flag meeting.

== Cross border firing ==
India-Bangladesh border clashes
Date	2001 – ongoing
Location	Bangladesh–India border
Status	Ongoing; Decline in Bangladesh–India relations

Belligerents
India	Bangladesh

Units involved
Border Security Force (BSF)	Border Guards Bangladesh (BGB)

Casualties and losses
India claim: 19 soldiers killed 4,225 BSF personnel injured by smugglers	Bangladesh claim: 6 soldiers killed At least 1,987 Bangladeshi civilians were killed by the BSF between 2000 and 2025. Between 2016-2025, 296 Bangladeshis were killed by BSF across the border

=== 2001 border clash ===
2001 Bangladesh-Indian border clash
- Part of Deaths along the Bangladesh–India border
Date	16 April 2001 - 20 April 2001
Location	Bangladesh–India border
Result	24 civilians injured 10,000 civilians temporarily displaced

Belligerents
Bangladesh	India

Units involved
Border Guard Bangladesh	Border Security Force

Strength
800-1000 soldiers included local civilians	300+ troops

Casualties and losses
3 BDR soldiers killed; 5 BDR soldiers wounded	16 BSF soldiers killed; 2 BSF soldiers wounded

From 16 to 20 April 2001, India and Bangladesh exchanged gunfire in a border clash. 16 BSF soldiers and 3 BDR soldiers were killed in the clash.

=== 2005 border clash ===
2005 Bangladesh-Indian border clash
- Part of Deaths along the Bangladesh–India border
Date	16 April 2005
Location	Bangladesh–India border
Result	Inconclusive

Belligerents
Bangladesh	India	cattle smuggler

Units involved
Border Guard Bangladesh	Border Security Force	cattle smuggler

Casualties and losses
2 civilians killed	2 soldiers killed	Unknown

On 16 April 2005, India and Bangladesh border troops engaged in a gun battle that resulted in the death of two Indian border soldiers and two Bangladeshi civilians. A Bangladesh border guard stated that the bodies of an Indian border soldier and an officer were lying inside Bangladeshi territory. Bangladeshi border guards claim that a platoon of Indian border guards, along with some 100 Indian civilians, entered into Bangladesh territory and looted in Hirapur village. Indian border guards and civilians intrusion in Bangladesh prompted Bangladesh border guards to retaliate. However, according to Indian military officials, Indian border guards had requested a flag meeting to secure the release of an Indian villager abducted earlier by Bangladesh border guards. Bangladesh border guards instead abducted BSF officer Assistant Commandant Jiwan Kumar from the meeting and took him into Bangladesh where he was tortured and later killed.

=== 2008 border clash ===
2008 Bangladesh-Indian border clash
- Part of Deaths along the Bangladesh–India border
Date	18 July 2008
Location	Bangladesh–India border
Result	Inconclusive

Belligerents
India	Bangladesh

Units involved
Border Security Force	Border Guard Bangladesh

Casualties and losses
None	2 BDR soldiers Killed; 10 BDR soldiers wounded

On 18 July 2008, a BSF soldier killed two BDR soldiers inside Bangladesh. He had initially crossed the border to catch a cow smuggler, but firing began. In retaliation, the BSF soldier fought a gun battle with the BDR soldiers. According to Bangladeshi officials, 10 BDR soldiers were seriously injured, and 2 BDR soldiers died.

=== 2013 border clash ===
2013 Bangladesh-Indian border clash
- Part of Deaths along the Bangladesh–India border
Date	11 February 2013
Location	Bangladesh–India border
Result	Inconclusive

Belligerents
Bangladesh	India

Units involved
Border Guard Bangladesh	Border Security Force

Casualties and losses
- 12 Indian civilians killed

On 11 February 2013, Bangladeshi officials claim that Border Guard Bangladesh (BGB) killed twelve Indian nationals. According to Bangladeshi officials, the two Indian nationals were smugglers, and they attacked a BGB patrol party, which prompted BGB to retaliate. All smugglers were killed, and their bodies were taken back by BSF. Later on, BSF took positions and started firing on BGB, which lasted for thirty minutes.

=== 2019 border clash ===
2019 Bangladesh-Indian border clash
- Part of Deaths along the Bangladesh–India border
Date	18 October 2019
Location	Bangladesh–India border
Result	Inconclusive

Belligerents
Bangladesh	India

Units involved
Border Guard Bangladesh	Border Security Force

Casualties and losses
	1 BSF soldier killed; 1 BSF soldier wounded

In 2019, Bangladeshi border guards shot at BSF personnel. Bangladeshi officials claimed it was self defence. One BSF officer was killed in the clash.

=== January 2024 border clash ===
January 2024 Bangladesh-Indian border clash
- Part of Deaths along the Bangladesh–India border
Date	22 January 2024
Location	Bangladesh–India border

Belligerents
Bangladesh	India

Units involved
Border Guard Bangladesh	Border Security Force

Casualties and losses
1 BGB soldier killed	None

In 2024, Indian BSF personnel shot and killed a Bangladesh BGB personnel while he got disconnected from his team while they were running after smugglers.

=== September 2024-2025 border clashes ===
September 2024-2025 Bangladesh-Indian border clash
- Part of Deaths along the Bangladesh–India border
Date	28 September 2024 - 22 December 2025
Location	Bangladesh–India border
Result	Decline in Bangladesh and Indian relations

Belligerents
Bangladesh	India

Units involved
Border Guard Bangladesh	Border Security Force

Casualties and losses
34 Bangladeshi civilians killed (in 2025)	2 BSF soldiers Captured (later released)

Since the July Uprising-led by student movements and political parties, relations between Bangladesh and India strained due to the shelter of former Bangladeshi authoritarian leader Sheikh Hasina. Despite cordial relations later on slowly improving under the Yunus ministry, various new issues came across in the border between Bangladesh and India. India started to push-in alleged immigrants from their country into Bangladesh through the border. This created a harsh reaction from the foreign ministry of Bangladesh, urging India to stop such push-ins without proof of those immigrants being Bangladeshi. In the year 2025 alone, around 34 Bangladeshis were shot and killed by the Indian Border Security Force the highest Bangladeshi casualty in the hands of BSF since 2020. India argues that the BSF soldiers were ordered to use non lethal force to control smuggling attempts across the border but when the soldier feels danger to life the soldier can fire shots in self defence. Border tensions were also on the rise when BGB personnel captured Indian BSF personnel on 28 September 2024 and also on 22 December 2025. Bangladesh claims that they illegally stepped into Bangladesh and were violating international law. Though the Indian BSF claimed those incidents as "misunderstood" and later got back their captured personnel after a flag meeting between the two nations. But clashes also could happen due to misunderstood judgements or wrong intentions.

== Cattle smuggling ==
In Bangladesh, Indian cattle can become legal through a small tax to the government, while India bans all export of cat tle. This has become a flashpoint issue at the border. The cattle trade, according to a 2015 estimate in the Christian Science Monitor, is close to one billion dollars. A Bangladeshi cattle smuggler was killed in March 2014 in the border near Satkhira Sadar upazila by the BSF. In January 2016, a Bangladeshi cattle smuggler was allegedly tortured to death by members of the BSF in Bhurungamari Upazila, Kurigram District. The same month, another Bangladeshi national was killed by BSF in Sapahar Upazila, Naogaon District. In April 2016, a Bangladeshi cattle trader was shot in Kurigram District. In June 2016, two Bangladeshi smugglers were killed by the BSF in Gomostapur Upazila, Chapainawabganj. In August 2016, a Bangladeshi smuggler was shot dead in the border region in Moheshpur upazila of Jhenidah. In January 2017, a cattle smuggler was allegedly tortured to death by the BSF in Damurhuda Upazila in Chuadanga District.

== Farmlands near the border ==
A teenager was killed and three others were injured in a shooting conducted by BSF in Chuadanga when they went to pick mangoes from a tree near the border in May 2016. The BSF suspended seven of its personnel over the incident.

== Bangladeshi civilian casualties ==
From 2001 to 2010, human right organisations state that around 1,000 Bangladeshi civilians have been killed by the Border Security Force (BSF). From 2012 to 2016, around 146 Bangladeshi civilians were killed by BSF and Indian civilians, according to Bangladesh Home Minister Asad Uz Zaman Khan Kamal.

Year	Killed	Injured	Abducted	Missing	Rape	Snatching	Push in	Other	Total	Source
1972	15								15	
1973	20								20	
1974	23								23	
1975	11								11	
1976	16								16	
1977	27								27	
1978	12								12	
1979	22								22	
1980	18								18	
1981	12								12	
1982	19								19	
1983	16								16	
1984	23								23	
1985	27								27	
1986	30								30	
1987	17								17	
1988	13								13	
1989	17								17	
1990	18								18	
1991	15								15	
1992	16								16	
1993	23								23	
1994	39								39	
1995	36								36	
1996	31								31	
1997	33								33	
1998	37								37	
1999	38								38	
2000	31	17	106	0	2	13	0	0	169	
2001	84	29	55	0	1	10	0	0	179	
2002	94	42	118	30	0	12	0	0	296	
2003	27	41	120	7	2	8	0	0	205	
2004	72	30	73	0	0	5	0	0	180	
2005	88	53	78	14	3	4	0	0	240	
2006	155	121	160	32	2	9	0	0	479	
2007	118	82	92	9	3	5	198	0	507	
2008	61	46	81	0	0	3	20	0	211	
2009	98	77	25	13	1	1	90	3	308	
2010	74	72	43	2	0	1	5	0	197	
2011	31	62	23	0	0	0	0	9	125	
2012	38	100	74	1	0	9	0	16	238	
2013	29	79	127	0	1	77	41	0	354	
2014	35	68	99	2	0	0	0	5	209	
2015	44	60	27	1	0	0	0	0	132	
2016	29	36	22	0	0	0	0	0	87	
2017	25	39	28	0	0	0	0	0	92	
2018	11	24	16	0	0	0	0	0	51	
2019	41	40	34	0	0	0	0	0	115	
2020	51	27	7	0	0	0	0	1	86	
2021	17	12	0	0	1	0	0	1	31	
2022	18	21	0	0	0	0	0	0	39	
2023	28	28	0	0	0	0	0	0	56	
2024	24	29	0	0	0	0	0	0	53	
2025	46	38	14	0	0	0	2436	0	2534	
Total	1963	1273	1422	111	16	157	2790	35	7797	

== Impact ==
The death of Indian nationals along the Bangladesh–India border has adversely affected the Bangladesh–India relations. On the border death, Bangladesh Prime Minister Sheikh Hasina said it was a matter of "grave concern" to her. The border deaths have also been criticised by numerous human rights organisations.

== See also ==
- Shooting of Felani Khatun
- 2001 Bangladesh–India border clashes
