= Bangladeshi nationalism =

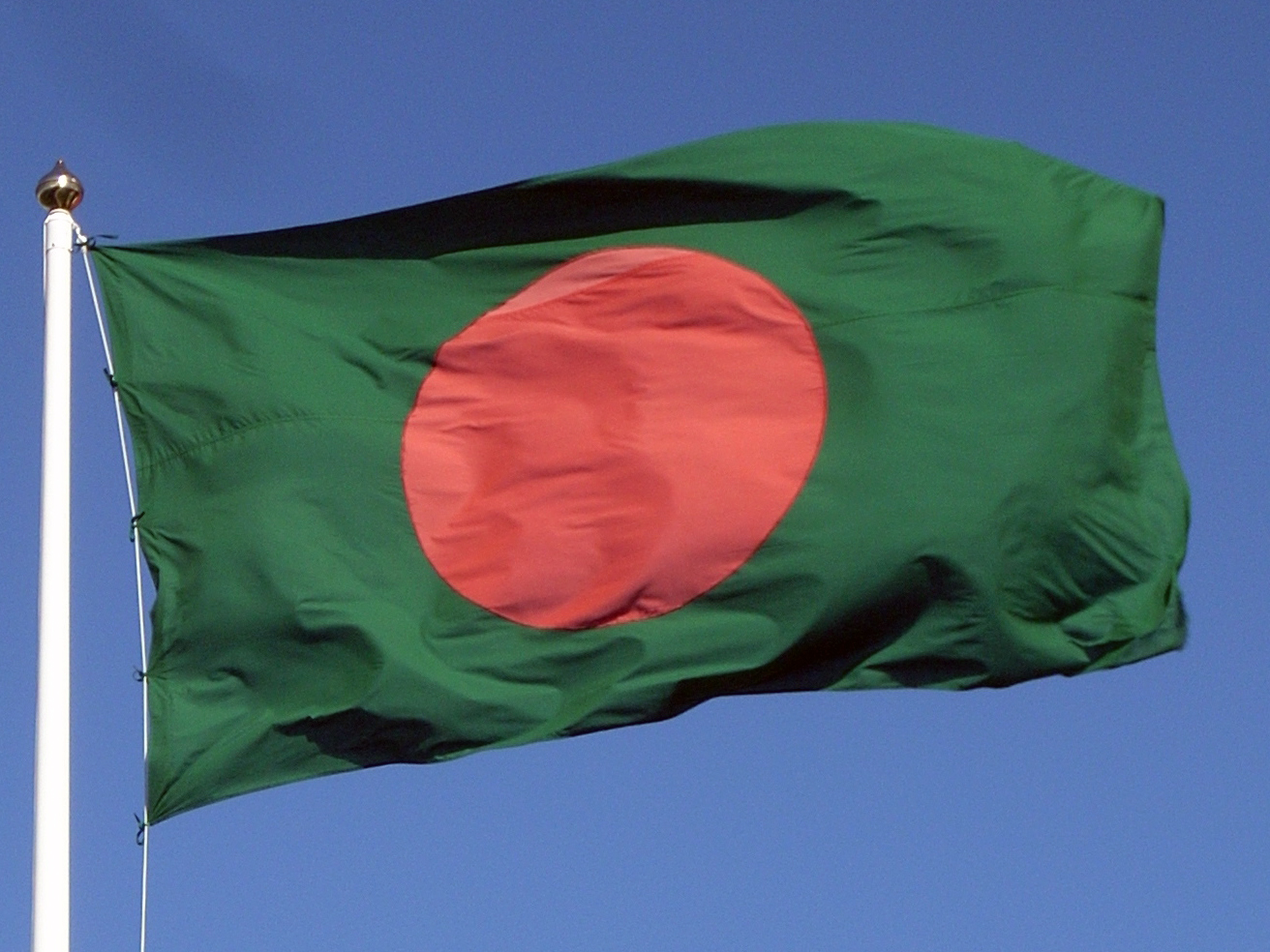
National flag of Bangladesh

Bangladeshi nationalism (Note: Bengali: বাংলাদেশী জাতীয়তাবাদ, romanised: Bāṅlādēśī jātīẏôtābād, pronounced [ˈbaŋladeʃiˑ ˈdʒati̯oˌtabad]) is a civic nationalism that promotes the territorial identity of Bangladeshis. It originated as an ideology that emerged during the late 1970s and popularised by former President Ziaur Rahman.

The history of nationalism in the country dates back to the colonial era, when the region started witnessing anti-colonial movements against the British Empire. Soon, a sense of religious nationalism began to emerge that later revolutionised into an ethnonationalism that was the driving force behind the East Bengali liberation war in East Pakistan and the emergence of independent Bangladesh in 1971. However, the popularisation of a separate national identity other than ethnicity, and the alienation of ethnic minorities post-independence led later leaders to espouse a more democratic civic form of nationalism based on territorial attachment of the people. When army chief Ziaur Rahman came to power, he sought to invigorate state policy and began to promote Bangladeshi nationalism.

== Background ==
The history of development of the territorial and cultural identity in Bangladesh coincided with the origination and growth of Bengali language and literature, predominantly during the period of Bengal Sultanate. The period also reflected religious plurality in the form of harmonious coexistence and cultural assimilation of Hindus and Muslims. The sense of a nation-state further advanced during the rule of the Nawab of Bengal. The concept of nationalism first emerged in the country after the Indian Rebellion of 1857 in the mid 19th century, grounded on the anti-colonial sentiment during the British rule. This nationalism transformed into a new version through the partition of Bengal in 1905, which was strongly opposed by the Hindus in West Bengal and was supported by Muslims of East Bengal. Even though the partition was annulled in 1911, it left a significant and lasting impact on the people, and for the first time sowed the seeds of Hindu-Muslim communal dissonance. It was the beginning of a religious nationalism which eventually led the Muslims to form a separate state.

After the formation of Pakistan, within a short period the idea of religious nationalism began to be replaced by a sense of ethnolinguistic nationalism among the people of then East Pakistan which was primarily caused by the cultural, economic and political discrimination by the West Pakistani elites. The language movement of 1952 was the biggest manifestation of this ethnolinguistic nationalism which later came to be known as Bengali nationalism. This resulted in the demand for regional autonomy for East Pakistan that eventually led to the independence of Bangladesh from Pakistan in 1971.

== Post-independence Bangladesh ==
Bangladeshi nationalism means, we are Bangladeshis. We have a different history. Our country has been born through a different process. Our traditions and culture are different. Our language is different, we are moulding it in our own way—we are modernizing it. We have different prose and poetry; we have different arts and thoughts. Our geographical position is different, our rivers and soils are different. Our people are different. We are completely free and sovereign… And today, a consciousness has grown among our people, which is different from that of the people of our neighboring country and other countries of the region.

— Ziaur Rahman

After independence, the government of Sheikh Mujibur Rahman began to promote Bengali nationalism which was also the basis of Bangladesh's independence from Pakistan. However, the nationalism based on the Bengali ethnicity left the indigenous peoples of Bangladesh dejected. Sheikh Mujib, rejecting the demands of constitutional recognition for the tribal culture and identity, urged upon the indigenous peoples to become Bengalis. Dissatisfied with the acts of the government, the indigenous peoples from Chittagong Hill Tracts formed Parbatya Chattagram Jana Sanghati Samiti, a political party, to demand autonomy.

After the Assassination of Sheikh Mujibur Rahman in 1975, following several coups and counter coups, Ziaur Rahman assumed power in 1976 and declared himself the President of Bangladesh. In an attempt to create a territorial identity in contrast to the ethnolinguistic identity of Bengali nationalism, Ziaur Rahman began to promote the idea of Bangladeshi nationalism. In an interview, Ziaur Rahman tried to give a comprehensive definition of this ideology.

From this time, citizens of Bangladesh came to be known as Bangladeshis instead of Bengali. According to scholars, Zia's main aim to foster this new thought was to distant the country from neighbouring India which had developed extensive ties with the Sheikh Mujib government. Proponents of Bangladeshi nationalism argue that this ideology has an edge over the previous Bengali nationalism because of its territorial appeal which succeeds to include the indigenous peoples of Bangladesh as well as distinguishes the people of Bangladesh from the Bengali people of India. According to Muhammad Ghulam Kabir, "Zia was motivated by the desire to unify the country and to further assert Bangladesh's sovereignty."

Political analyst Maruf Mallick argued that Zia wanted to move away from "narrow minded" ethnic and religious nationalism and wanted to create the identity of the citizens on the basis of the state, basically on the model of Western or Northern European countries.

== Features ==
=== Theoretical basis ===
Traditional nationalist theories form the basis for Bangladeshi nationalism. Burhan Uddin Ahmed states that there are some major theoretical influences of Ernest Renan and Max Weber on the ideology.

=== Territorial & national sovereignty ===
A major feature of Bangladeshi nationalism is the territorial boundary of Bangladesh, which emphasises on the protection of the sovereign geographic sanctity of the state against the expansionist and colonialist forces. This territorial concept has been described as an inclusive idea which incorporates the association of all people living within the territory of Bangladesh, regardless their ethnicity or religion.

The notion of sovereignty also relates to the recognition of the liberation war of 1971 without which, states Rahman, Bangladeshi nationalism remains incomplete, as it serves as the foundation of the nation state.

=== Economy ===
Rahman, while describing Bangladeshi nationalism, also introduced the idea of "peaceful revolutionary economic system" as a key feature of the ideology. He believed that Bangladesh's socialist-influenced economy had been in a poor shape because of "years of colonial-style exploitation". To abate the deteriorating conditions, a revamp of the economic system is required. According to Mubashar Hasan, this new economic system was primarily an "outline for a capitalist system".

=== Influences of Islam ===
While replacing Bengali nationalism with Bangladeshi nationalism as one of the fundamental principles, Ziaur Rahman also removed the principle of secularism, which was also one of the main features of Bengali nationalism and inserted the line "absolute trust and faith on Almighty Allah". Scholars argue that it was a political strategy of Rahman to win the confidence and support of the right wing political parties of Bangladesh. Rahman also intended to strengthen the relations of the country with other Muslim states, especially from the Middle East. The act also helped the country to be differentiated from neighbouring India, a Hindu majority state.

Rahman also promoted religious freedom as a component of Bangladeshi nationalism. Mubashar Hasan states, Rahman's position on religious freedom adheres to the Islamic principle of Tawhid or "the oneness of Allah" and that Rahman's idea of religious freedom is based on "Islamic way, not a liberal secular way". However, Rahman had dismissed theocracy as the governing system for Bangladesh and had opined that "religion should not form the ideological framework of a political party".

After the assassination of Ziaur Rahman in 1981, Hussain Mohammed Ershad, who held the power following the 1982 coup d'état, also actively nurtured Bangladeshi nationalism with high priority on Islam. Ershad had to rely on the support of the right wing political parties as he did not have any support base within both the Awami League and Bangladesh Nationalist Party. In 1988, Ershad went even further by declaring Islam as the state religion.

== List of Bangladeshi nationalist political parties ==
- Jatiya Samajtantrik Dal
- Bangladesh Labour Party
- Bangladesh Nationalist Party
- Jatiya Ganatantrik Party
- Bangladesh Freedom Party
- Jatiya Party (Ershad)
- National Democratic Party
- Bangladesh Jatiya Party
- Liberal Democratic Party
- National People's Party
- Bangladesh Kalyan Party
- Bangladesh Nationalist Front
- Trinamool BNP
- Nationalist Democratic Movement

=== Defunct ===
- Jatiyatabadi Ganatantrik Dal (1977–1978)
- Democratic League (1977–1989)

== See also ==
- United Bengal
- Bangladesh Zindabad
- Independence of Bangladesh
  - Bangladesh Liberation War
- Conservatism in Bangladesh
- Islamization in Bangladesh
- Islamic nationalism
  - Pakistani nationalism
- 2001 Bangladesh–India border skirmishes

== Bibliography ==
- Absar, A. B. M. Nurul (1 March 2014). "Muslim Identity, Bengali Nationalism: An Analysis on Nationalism in Bangladesh". Academic Journal of Interdisciplinary Studies. 3 (1). Rome: MCSER Publishing: 439–449. doi:10.5901/ajis.2014.v3n1p439.
- Alam, S. M. Shamsul (1991). "Language as Political Articulation: East Bengal in 1952". Journal of Contemporary Asia. 24 (4): 469–487. doi:10.1080/00472339180000311.
- Flavio, Comim; Fennell, Shailaja; Anand, P. B., eds. (2018). New frontiers of the capability approach. Cambridge, UK: Cambridge University Press. ISBN 978-1-108-58699-3. OCLC 1060524915.
- Hasan, Mubashar (2020). Islam and Politics in Bangladesh: The Followers of Ummah. Singapore: Springer Nature. ISBN 978-981-15-1116-5.
- Hossain, Hameeda; Mohsin, Amena, eds. (2016). Of the Nation Born: The Bangladesh Papers. New Delhi: Zubaan. ISBN 9781108427807.
- Huq, Abdul F. (1984). "The problem of National Identity in Bangladesh". Journal of Social Studies. 24: 47–73.
- Mahn, Churnjeet; Anne, Murphy, eds. (2017). Partition and the practice of memory. Cham, Switzerland: Springer. ISBN 978-3-319-64516-2. OCLC 1015215576.
- Mohsin, Amena (2003). The Chittagong Hill Tracts, Bangladesh: On the Difficult Road to Peace. Lynne Rienner Publishers. p. 166. ISBN 978-1-58826-138-0.
- Phadnis, Urmila; Ganguli, Rajat (2001). Ethnicity and Nation-Building in South Asia. Sage Publications. p. 467. ISBN 978-0-7619-9438-1.
- Uddin, Sufia M. (2006). Constructing Bangladesh: Religion, Ethnicity, and Language in an Islamic Nation. University of North Carolina Press. pp. 224. ISBN 978-0-8078-3021-5.
- van Schendel, Willem; Guhathakurta, Meghna (2013). The Bangladesh Reader: History, Culture, Politics. Duke University Press. p. 550. ISBN 978-0-8223-5318-8.
- Wright, Denis (1988). Bangladesh: Origins and Indian Ocean Relations. New Delhi: Sterling Publishers. p. 310. ISBN 9788120708396.
