= Indo-Bangla Treaty of Friendship, Cooperation and Peace =

1972 treaty between India and Bangladesh

- Type: Bilateral treaty
- Signed: March 19, 1972
- Location: Dhaka, Bangladesh
- Expiry: March 19, 1997
- Signatories: Indira Gandhi; Sheikh Mujibur Rahman
- Parties: India; Bangladesh

The India–Bangladesh Treaty of Friendship, Cooperation and Peace was a 25-year treaty that was signed on 19 March 1972 forging close bilateral relations between India and the newly established state of Bangladesh. The treaty was also known as the Indira–Mujib Treaty, after the signatories of the treaty the Prime Minister of India Indira Gandhi and the Prime Minister of Bangladesh Sheikh Mujibur Rahman.

== Background ==
During the Bangladesh Liberation War of 1971, India provided extensive aid, training and shelter for the exiled government of Bangladesh and Bengali nationalist Mukti Bahini guerrilla force that was fighting the Pakistani Army. Between 8 and 10 million refugees poured into India during 1971, increasing tensions between India and Pakistan. At the outbreak of the Indo-Pakistani War of 1971, the Joint Force including regular army of Bangladesh, Mukti Bahini and the Indian Military liberated then East Pakistan, leading to the establishment of Bangladesh. India's role in the independence of Bangladesh led to the development of strong bilateral relations. Then-Indian Prime Minister Indira Gandhi spoke along with Bangladesh's founding leader Sheikh Mujibur Rahman before more than 500,000 people at Suhrawardy Udyan in Dhaka.

== Provisions ==
The twelve Articles incorporated in the treaty were:

(i) The contracting parties solemnly declare that there shall be lasting peace and friendship between the two countries and each side shall respect the independence, sovereignty and territorial integrity of the other and refrain from interfering in the internal affairs of the other side;

(ii) The contracting parties condemn colonialism and racialism of all forms, and reaffirm their determination to strive for their final and complete elimination;

(iii) The contracting parties reaffirm their faith in the policy of non-alignment and peaceful co-existence as important factors for easing tension in the world, maintaining international peace and security and strengthening national sovereignty and independence;

(iv) The contracting parties shall maintain regular contacts and exchange views with each other on major international problems affecting the interest of both the states;

(v) The contracting parties shall continue to strengthen and widen their mutually advantageous and all round co-operation in the economic, scientific and technical fields, and shall develop mutual co-operation in the fields of trade, transport and communication on the basis of the principles of equality and mutual benefit;

(vi) The contracting parties agree to make joint studies and take joint action in the field of flood control, river basin development and development of hydro-electric power and irrigation;

(vii) Both the parties shall promote relations in the field of arts, literature, education, culture, sports and health;

(viii) In accordance with the ties of friendship existing between the two countries, each of the contracting parties solemnly declare that it shall not enter into or participate in any military alliance directed against the other party. Each of the parties shall refrain from any aggression against the other party and shall not allow the use of its territory for committing any act that may cause military damage to or continue to threat to the security of the other contracting parties;

(ix) Each of the contracting parties shall refrain from giving any assistance to any third party taking part in an armed conflict against the other party. In case if either party is attacked or threatened to attack, the contracting parties shall immediately enter into mutual consultations to take necessary measures to eliminate the threat and thus ensure the peace and security of their countries;

(x) Each of the parties solemnly declare that it shall not undertake any commitment, secret or open, towards one or more states which may be incompatible with the present treaty;

(xi) The present treaty is signed for a term of twenty-five years, and shall be renewed by mutual agreement;

(xii) Any differences interpreting any Article of the treaty shall be settled on a bilateral basis by peaceful means in a spirit of mutual respect and understanding.

== Expiration ==
Although initially received enthusiastically by both nations, the treaty with India became the subject of resentment and controversy in Bangladesh, where people saw it as unequal and an imposition of excessive Indian influence. Issues such as the dispute over water resources of the Farakka Barrage and India's perceived delayed withdrawal of troops began to diminish the spirit of friendship. Sheikh Mujib's pro-India policies antagonised many in politics and the military. The assassination of Mujib in 1975 led to the establishment of military regimes that sought to distance the country from India.

Mujib's death led to the establishment of diplomatic relations with Pakistan and other nations that had opposed the creation of Bangladesh, such as Saudi Arabia and the People's Republic of China. Bangladesh was criticised for allowing Indian secessionist groups such as the United Liberation Front of Assam (ULFA) to operate from bases on its territory, and Bangladeshi intelligence agencies were suspected of maintaining links with Pakistan's intelligence agencies. Bangladesh in turn alleged that India was supporting the Shanti Bahini insurgency in the Chittagong Hill Tracts. The two governments declined to renegotiate or renew the treaty when it approached expiry in 1997.
