= Kholapota =

- Village
- Location in West Bengal, India. Kholapota (India)
- Coordinates: 22.682893°N 88.812296°E
- Country: India
- State: West Bengal
- District: North 24 Parganas
- Block: Basirhat II

Government
  - MP: Nusrat Jahan
  - MLA: Rafiqul Islam Mondal

Languages
  - Official: Bengali, English
- Time zone: UTC+5:30 (Indian Standard Time (IST))
- Postal Index Number (PIN): 743428
- Telephone code: +91 3217
- Vehicle registration: WB26
- Lok Sabha constituency: Basirhat
- Vidhan Sabha constituency: Basirhat Uttar
- Website: north24parganas.nic.in

Kholapota is a village and a gram panchayat in Basirhat II CD Block in Basirhat subdivision of North 24 Parganas district, West Bengal in India.

== Geography ==
It is located 35 kilometres east from district headquarters Barasat. 60 kilometres (37 mi) from the state capital Kolkata. Kholapota is surrounded by Baduria Block on the north, Basirhat I Block on the east, Haroa Block on the south and Deganga Block on the west. Taki, Barasat, Basirhat, and Hasnabad are nearby cities of Kholapota. The nearest Railway station is Champapukur railway station.

== Demographics ==
In the 2011 Census of India Kholapota has not been identified as a separate place. The population is clearly included in that of another place, but it is not specified in the census records.

== Economy ==
=== Banks ===
There are branches of the State Bank of India, Bank of India and UCO Bank, at Kholapota.

== Transport ==
SH 2 and SH 3 meet at Kholapota, follow a common route for a short distance and then separate out.

== Education ==
Kholapota P.K Haldar girls high school and Kholapota Sri Abrabindo Tapoban Pathmandir are the two schools of the village.
