= Jhuruli =

- Village
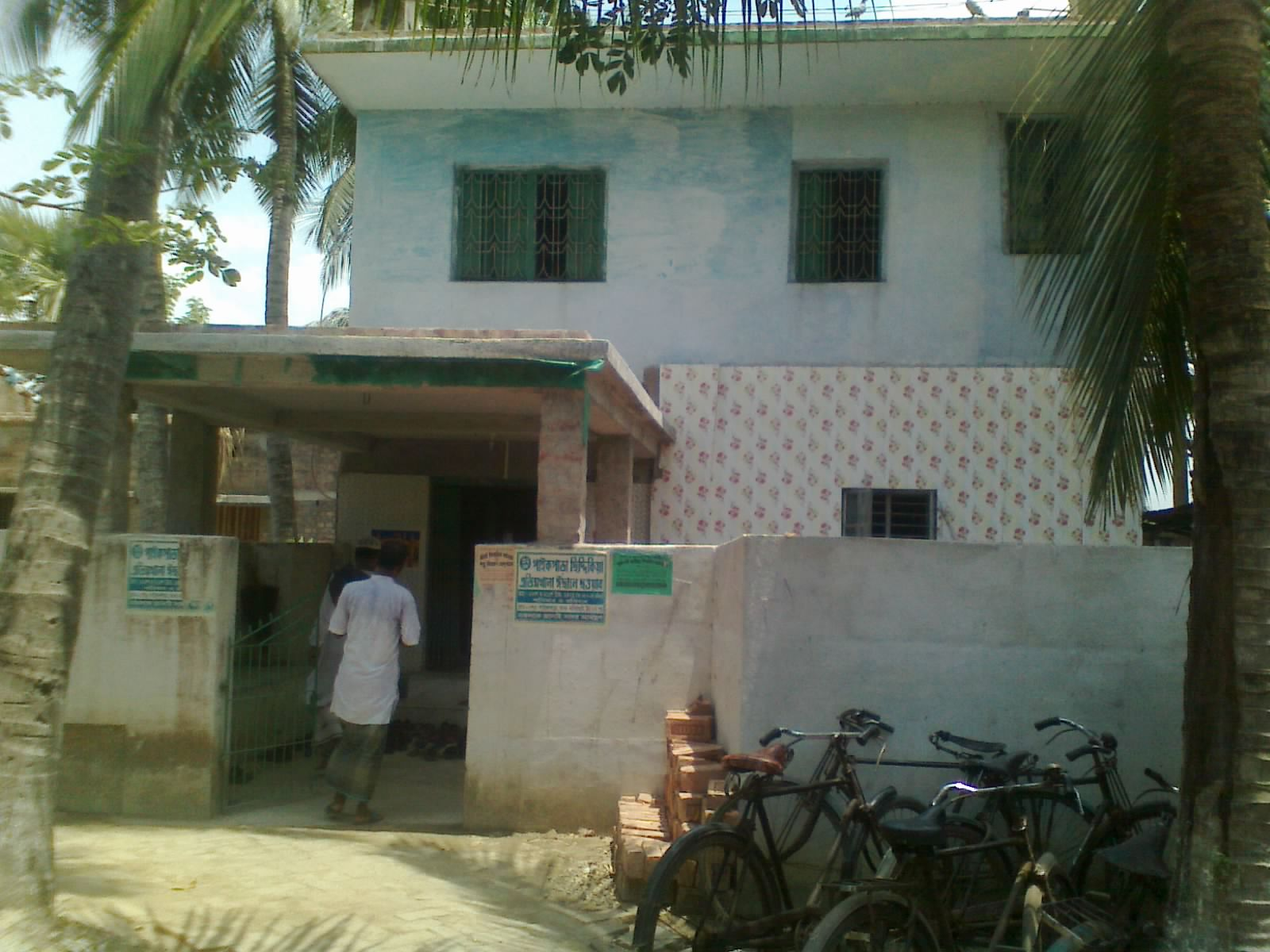
- Jhuruli Mosque

- Location in West Bengal, India Jhuruli (India)
- Coordinates: 22.603550°N 88.798241°E
- Country: India
- State: West Bengal
- District: North 24 Parganas district
- CD Block: Basirhat II

Government
  - Gram Members (Village Members): Nasima Khatun, Sahanur Dafadar
  - M.P: (Haji Nurul Islam 2024 Lok Sabha)
  - M.L.A: (Mohammad Tauseefur Rahaman 2026 Vidhan Sabha)

Population (2011)
  - Total: 2,967

Languages
  - Official: Bengali
- Time zone: UTC5:30 (IST)
- PIN: 743456
- Telephone code: 03217
- ISO 3166 code: IN-WB
- Vehicle registration: WB26
- Lok Sabha constituency: Basirhat
- Vidhan Sabha constituency: Basirhat Uttar
- Website: north24parganas.nic.in

Jhuruli is a village in Basirhat II CD Block in Basirhat subdivision of North 24 Parganas district in the Indian state of West Bengal.

== Geography ==
Jhuruli is situated in the Ganges Brahmaputra delta of West Bengal, about 16 km from the Bangladesh border and 50 km from Kolkata, capital of the West Bengal. A high tension electricity transmission line of 11 kv from Harishpur, Basirhat has been routed through the village road.

=== Weather ===
The weather in Jhuruli is similar to that elsewhere in West Bengal, with a tropical climate, specifically a tropical wet and dry climate (Aw) under the Köppen climate classification, with seven months of dryness and peak of rains in July. Humidity is always on the higher side, but not in winter. The cooler season from December to February is followed by summer from March to June. The period from June to about the end of September constitutes the south-west monsoon season, and the period between October and November forms the post-monsoon season. Between June and September, the south west monsoon brings rain over the village. Pre-monsoon showers are received in May, and north-east monsoon showers occasionally occur in October and November.

The maximum annual rainfall ever recorded was 1500 mm for every year, and the highest rainfall recorded in a single day was 850 mm. The average total annual rainfall is 1500 mm.

The average annual temperature is 32 °C (90 °F), and the average maximum temperature is 35 °C (95 °F), while the average minimum temperature is 28 °C (82 °F). In the summer the temperature goes up to 35 °C (95 °F), but it drops to approximately 10 °C (50 °F) in the winter.

=== Groundwater ===
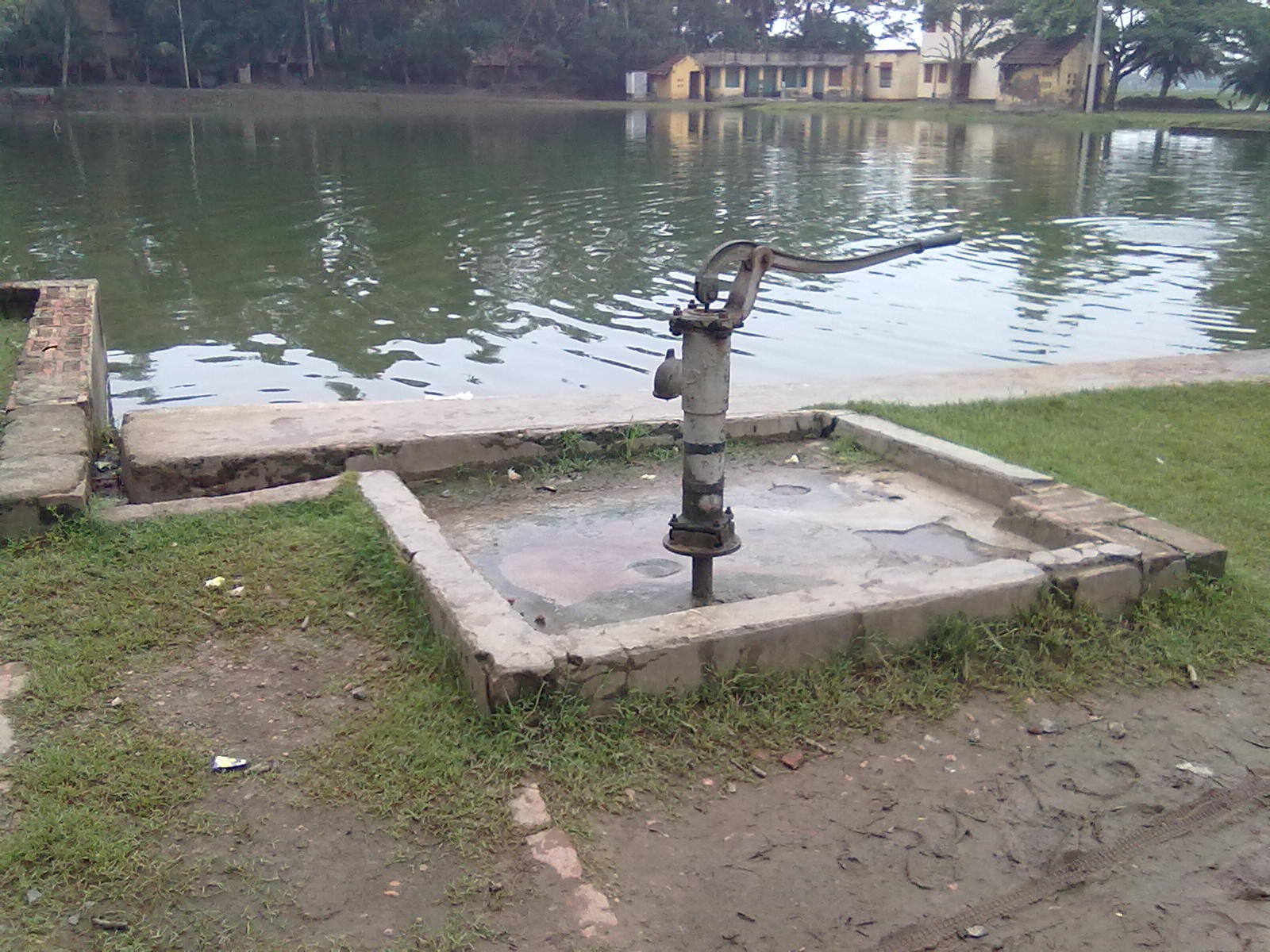

The village's groundwater is contaminated by arsenic but solutions for purification have been found. The Government of West Bengal has dug up tube wells in several places and connected water pumps to houses.

The North 24 Parganas district has been identified as one of the areas where ground water is affected by arsenic contamination.

== Demographics ==
As of 2011 Indian census, Jhuruli had a population of 2,967: 1,545 male and 1,422 female. It has an average literacy rate of 75.02%, higher than the national average of 74.04%.

== Economy ==
Many villagers work in the fishery business. Another local business is transportation of fabric, fish and other products to Kolkata.

== Village parts ==
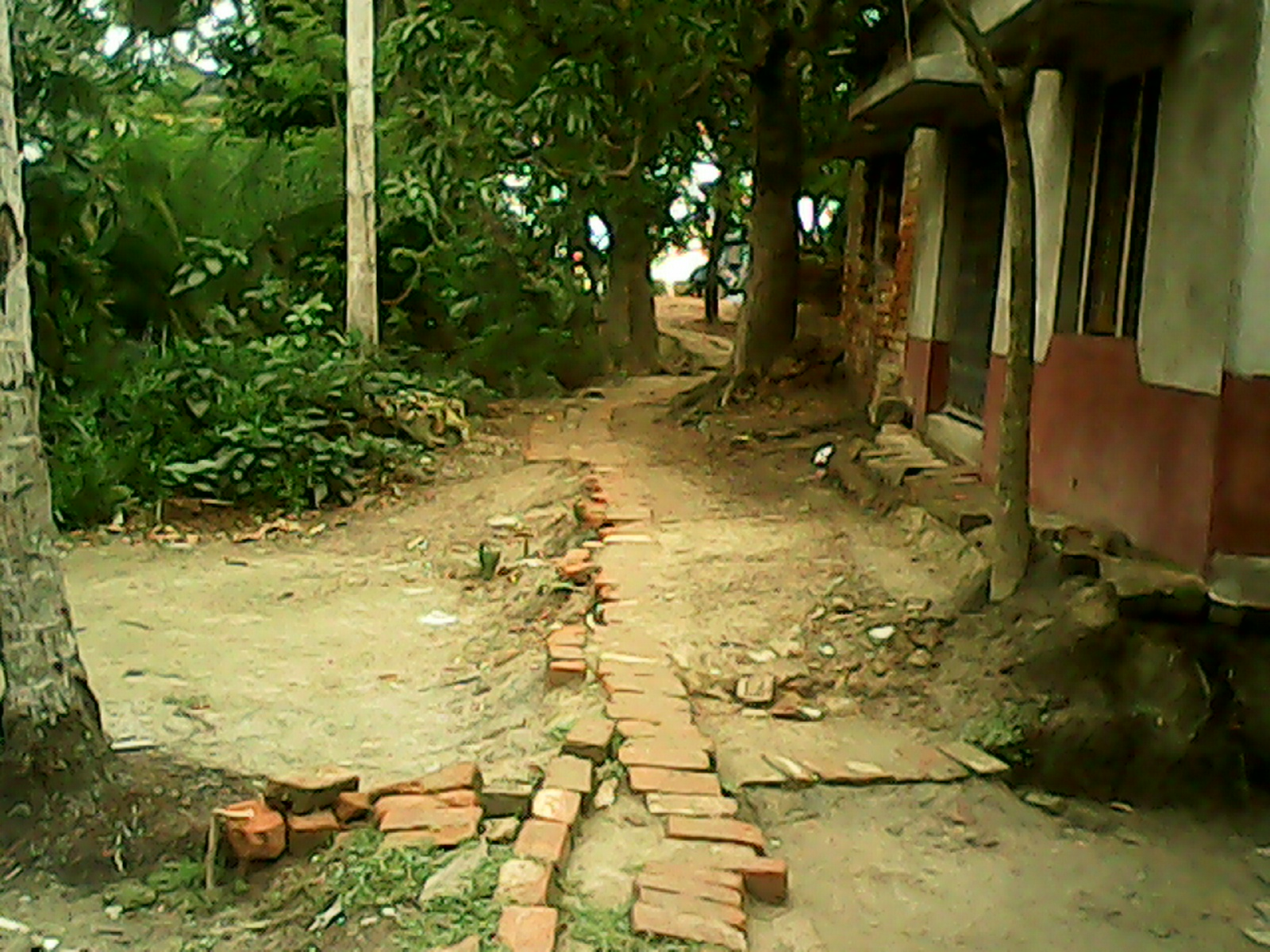
Jhuruli Mazher para in June 2014; the narrow lane leads to the village

The village consists of six parts:

- Biswas Para (Bengali: বিশ্বাস পাড়া)
- Majher para (Bengali: মাঝের পাড়া)
- Molla para (Bengali: মোল্লা পাড়া)
- Shekh para (Bengali: শেখ পাড়া)
- Purba para (Bengali: পূর্ব পাড়া)
- Dakshin para (Bengali: দক্ষিণ পাড়া)

== Politics ==
The All India Trinamool Congress, Communist Party of India (Marxist), PDCI Party, and Indian National Congress represent Jhuruli in the Lok Sabha, Rajya Sabha and Vidhan Sabha. The current representatives of the village are Nasima Khatun and Sahanur Dafadar for AITC in 2023 and, Member of Parliament Haji Nurul Islam, and Member of the Legislative Assembly Mohammad Tauseefur Rahaman.

=== Political members of 2003-2028 ===
Political members	Period	Booth No.
Abul Kalam Azad	2003–2008	8
Shekh Anarul Islam	2003–2008	9
Abdul Rouf Mondal	2008–2013	8
Rofikul Mondal	2008–2013	9
Nurali Mondal	2013–2018	8
Rofikul Mondal	2013–2018	9
Mostafa Dafadar	2018–2023	8
Khadija Khatun	2018–2023	9
Nasima Khatun	2023-	8
Sahanur Dafadar	2023-	9
Source: Gram panchayat election.

== Education ==
The educational percentage is about 40% but gradually increasing.

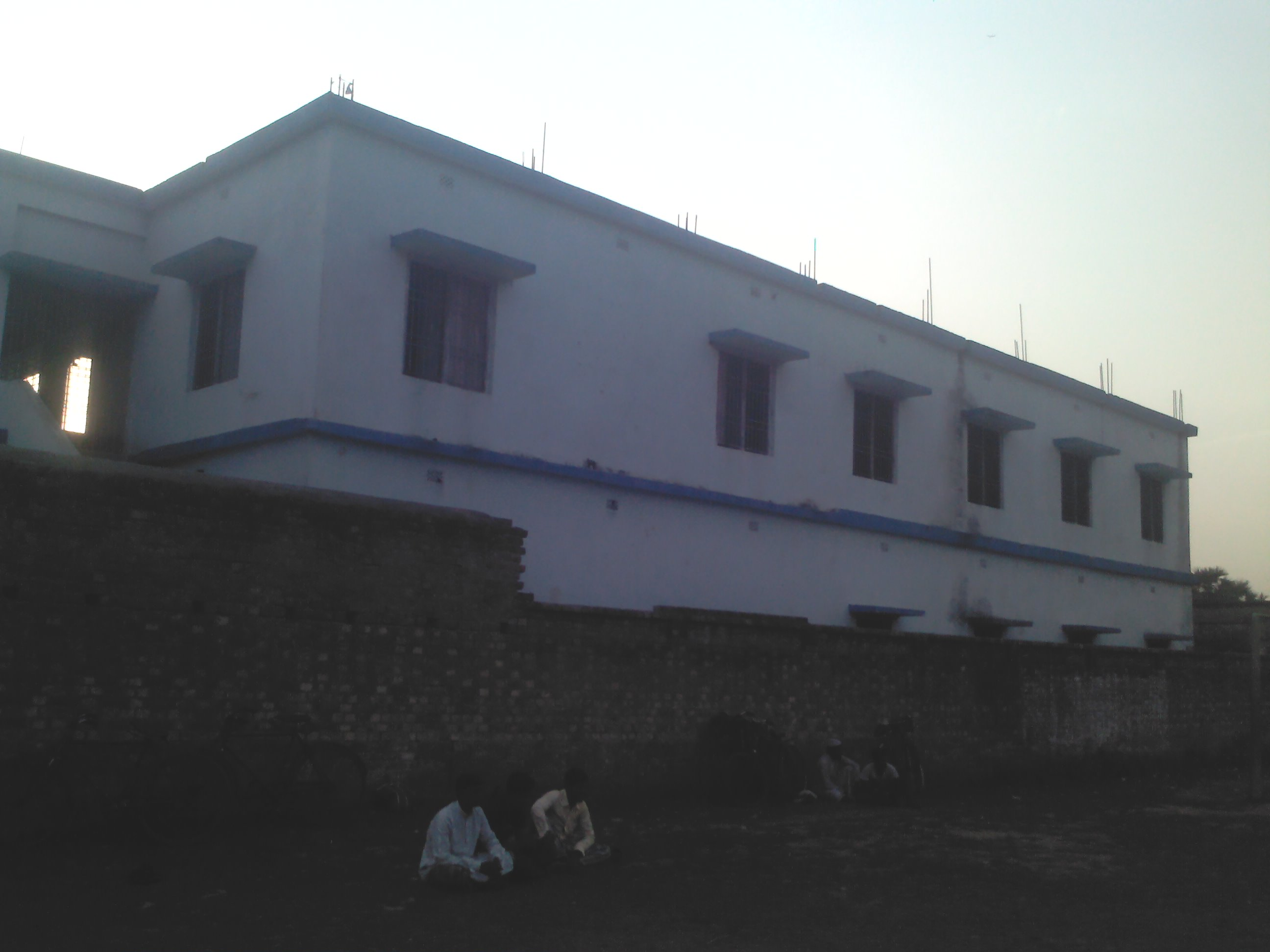
Jhuruli Adarsha Vidyapith in February 2014

Jhuruli Adarsha Vidyapith is a grade school running up to class 10, and Jhuruli Jr Basic School is a primary school up to grade class 4 respectively.

=== Schools in the village ===
- Jhuruli Adarsha Vidyapith
- Jhuruli Jr Basic School
- Jhuruli Uttar para Sid Ami

== Rural structure ==
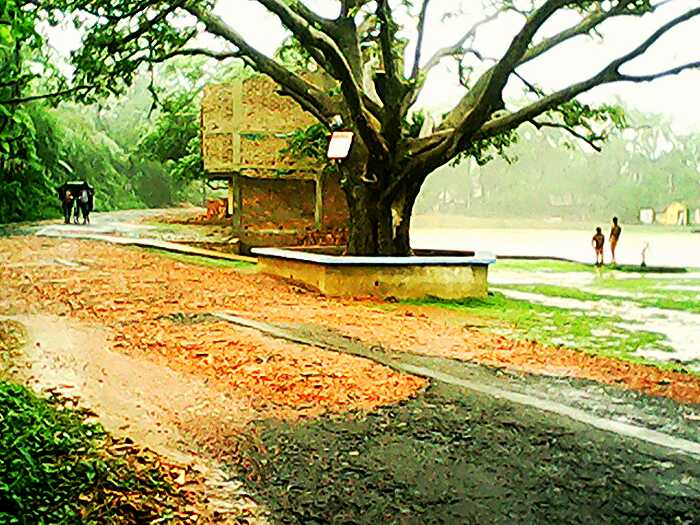
The nearby ball field and school side during a rainy day in June 2014

In Jhuruli, all boundaries which bounded the village are seemed to be specific. The area cover mostly with small parts of the village. The edge of the village which also stated round the village is watery called sometime "Jolkor" means water tax and some time Plunge means general use free water. Jolkor is projected with fishery which is the main economic point of the village. The roads about here are narrow, they are seemed as turn now to the right and now to the left. It is said that the village faces always the cool air of water, basically the cool air of Jolkor that bounds the village.

== Infrastructure ==
The sovereignty of society with political and social is deep-rooted here that graduated by government's infrastructure. The political and social organizations are abided of government's rule.

Census chart of Jhuruli collection:
Category	Total	Percentage
Population	2,967(29.67%)
Households	6,25
Male	1,545(52%)
Female	1,422(48%)
Literates	2,226(75%)
Illiterates	7,11(25%)
Workers	9,42(32%)
Non workers	2,025(68%)
Census collected about population and general info.

Village information with code of census and India village directory
Category	Description	Code
Jhuruli	Code of census,2011	1736500
State	The state of Jhuruli is West Bengal	19
District	Jhuruli falls under North 24 Parganas in W.B	337C.D
Block	Jhuruli → Basirthat ll (Community development block)	02330
Source: Census of India

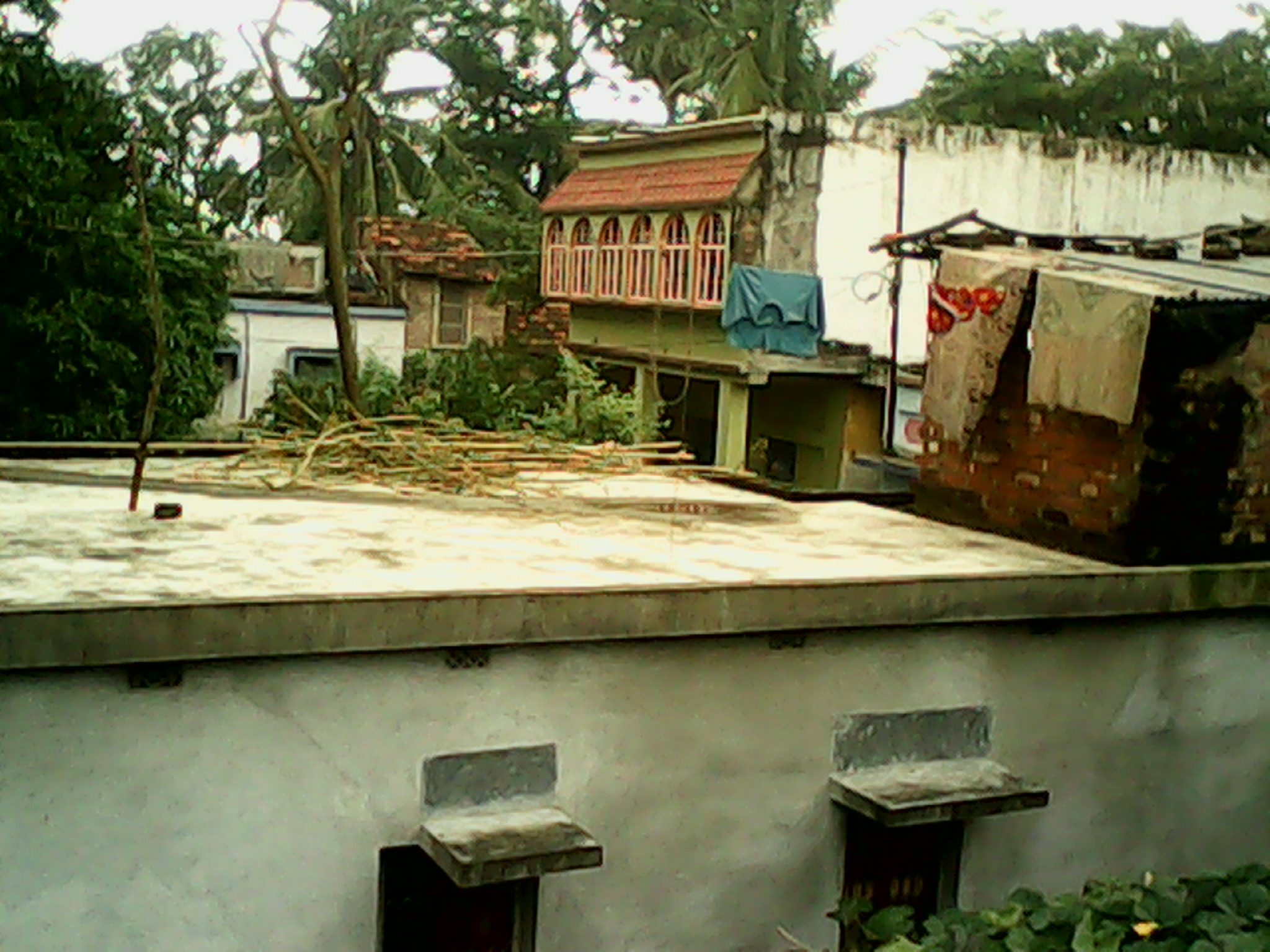
Jhuruli Mazer para from roof that comes to face gathering big and small houses.

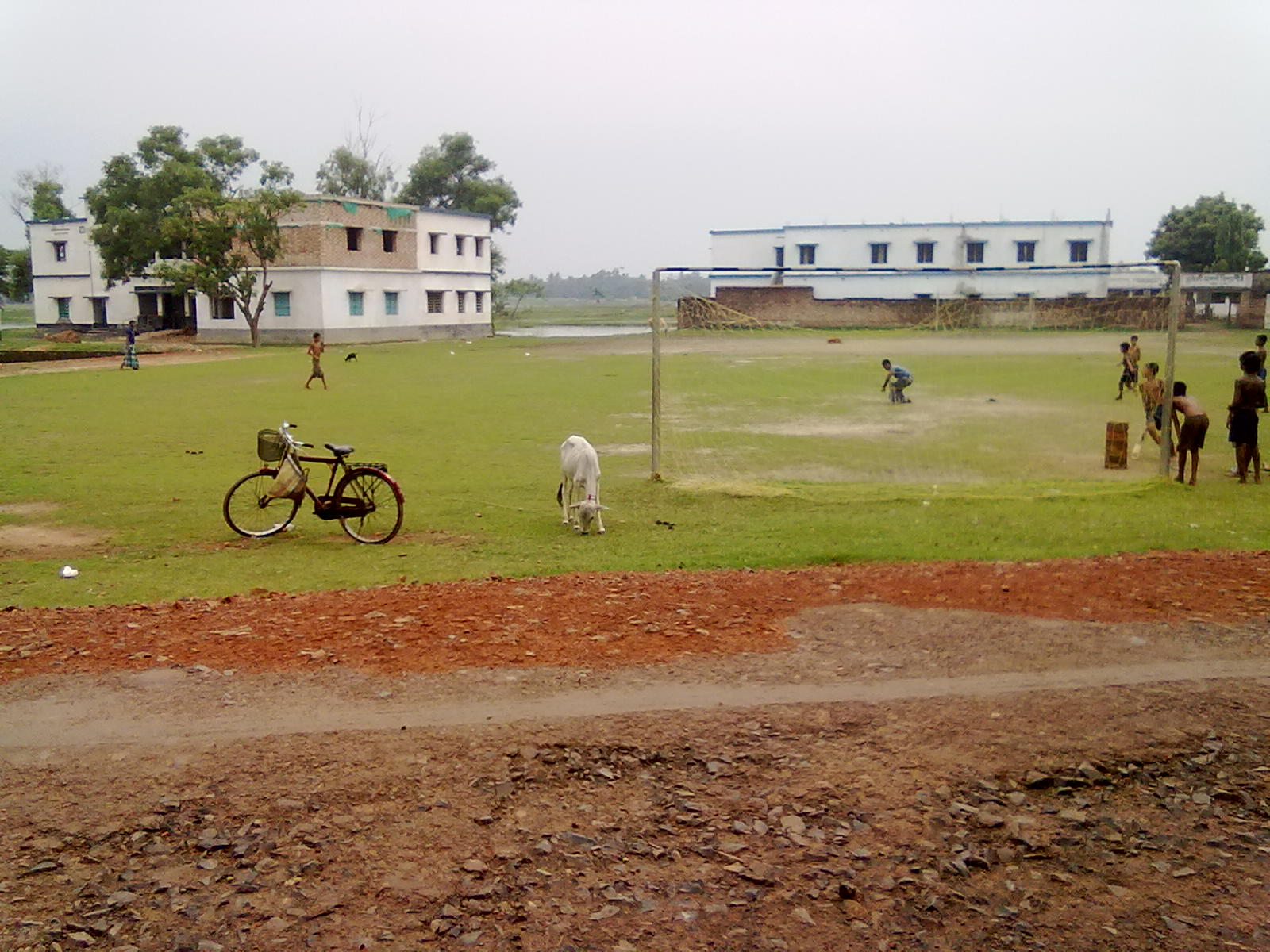
Jhuruli Ball field in afternoon, boys are playing game.

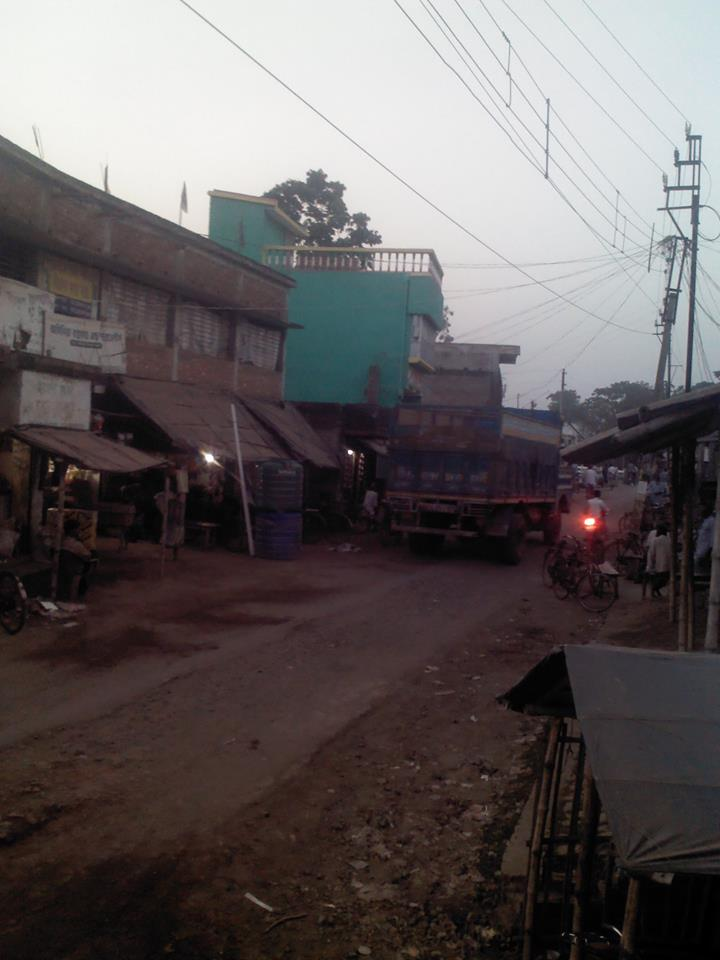
Garakupi market

== Transport ==
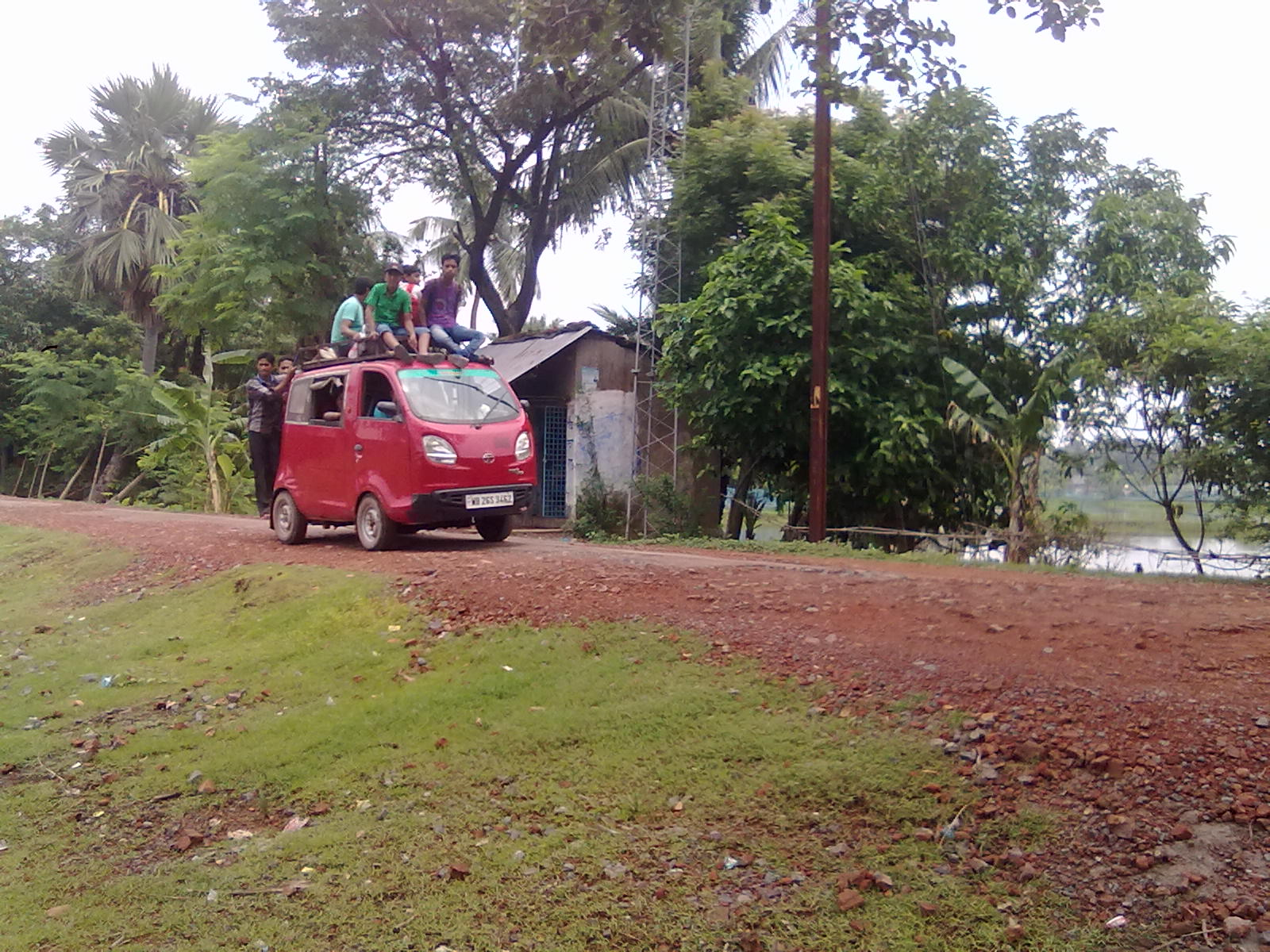
The nano car carries passengers with others on the roof in 2014.

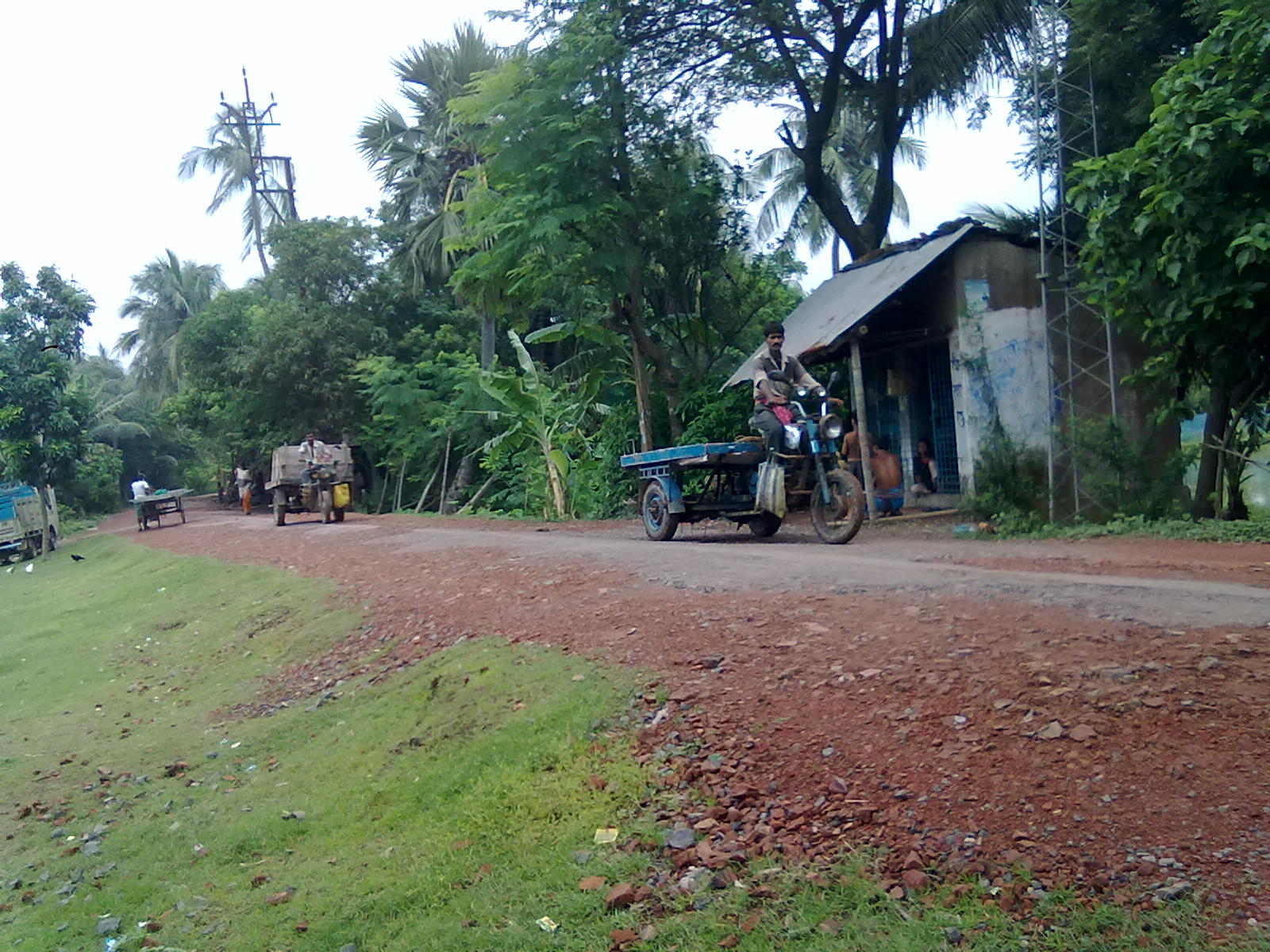
Transportation in Jhuruli through engine van in 2014. This engine van carries heavy goods.

In Jhuruli, the transport has developed gradually. There is bus transport, which was begun in 2008 with about 40 buses. The DN 38 bus route started from Taranipur to Malancha through Basirhat town, Champapukur, Kholapota. It stopped unexpectedly in 2013 due to the road being in bad condition. Other transport systems include auto rickshaw, motorcycle, motor van, Maruti Suzuki, taxi and bicycle.

The goods which are transported to various town and other part of India are: fish, crayfish, shrimp, whitefish, big guns, ready made fabric, textiles, garments (shirt, pants, gown, skirts, etc.)

== Healthcare ==
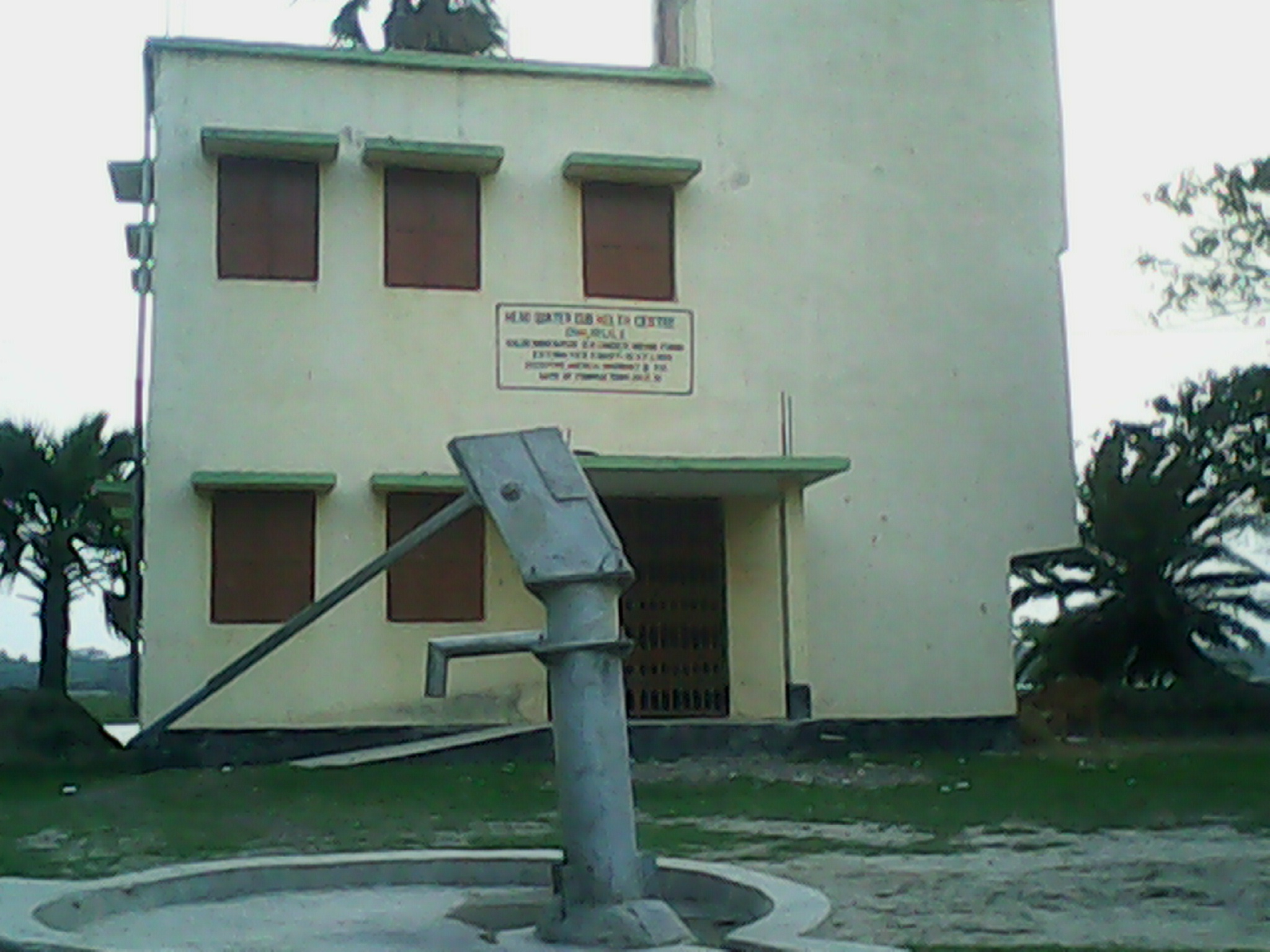
Jhuruli Healthcare position at the right side of Jhuruli Junior Basic School

There is a healthcare centre in Jhuruli that is also used by the surrounding villages.

== Culture ==
People in Jhuruli wear dhuti, lungi, pajama, shirt, trousers and speak in a rural dialect. They sometimes speak Hindi, but they speak Bengali most of the time. English is frequently used.

=== Sports ===
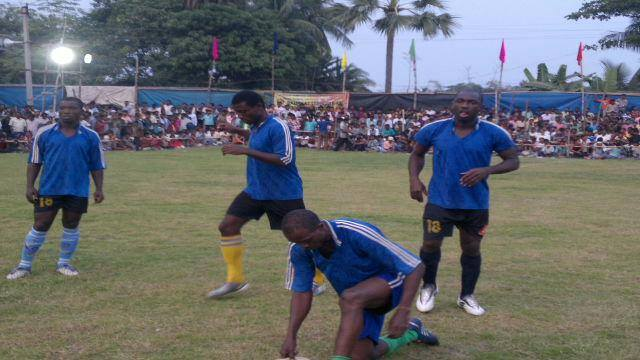
A tournament held during the late 2013 by JAKC

Every year during November - December, the village holds a football tournament of 16 teams organized by Jhuruli Abahani Krira Chakra in the village's football field. Apart from that, there are daily football matches played in afternoon along with cricket and other sports. Club elections are held every three years.
