= Chaita, North 24 Parganas =

Chaita
- Village
- Location in West Bengal, India Chaita (India)
- Coordinates: 22°38′17.59″N 88°45′17.05″E
- Country: India
- State: West Bengal
- District: North 24 Parganas

Government
  - Type: Panchayath
  - Body: Chaita Gram Panchayat

Population (2011)
  - Total: 2,390

Languages
  - Official: Bengali, English
- Time zone: UTC+5:30 (IST)
- PIN: 743445
- Telephone/STD code: 03217
- Lok Sabha constituency: Basirhat
- Vidhan Sabha constituency: Basirhat Uttar
- Website: north24parganas.nic.in

Chaita is a village and a gram panchayat in Basirhat II CD Block in Basirhat subdivision of North 24 Parganas district, West Bengal, India

== Civic administration ==
=== Sarpanch of Chaita Gram Panchayat ===
The Chaita gram panchayat has ten villages, named Ghona, Jagatpur, Kendua, Chaita, Malatipur, Kripalpur, Sadiknagar, Komrabad, Gangati and Hazratala. As per constitution of India and Panchyati Raaj Act, Chaita village is administrated by Sarpanch (Head of Village) who is elected representative of village.

Election	Member	Party Affiliation
2008	Rabiul Islam Mondal	Indian National Congress
2013	Ayub Ali Mondal	Communist Party of India (Marxist)
2018	Sonali Bibi	All India Trinamool Congress
2023	Nizamuddin Ahmed	All India Trinamool Congress

=== Electoral divisions ===
Gram Panchayat seats at Chaita Gram Panchayat

Seat	Polling Station no.	Area	Polling Station	Village
I/1	78	Gangati Purba Para	Gangati F.P. School	Gangati
II/2	79	Kripalpur Paschim Para	Gangati F.P. School	Gangati
III/3	80	Malatipur Uttar Para	Gangati F.P. School	Gangati
IV/4	81	Sadiknagar	Sadiknagar Nabibala Smriti F.P. School	Sadiknagar
V/5	82	Hazratala Uttar Para	Hazratala F.P. School	Hazratala
VI/6	83	Hazratala Paschim Para	Hazratala F.P. School	Hazratala
VII/7	84	Kripalpur Uttar Para	Kripalpur F.P. School	Kripalpur
VIII/8	85	Kripalpur Daspara	Kripalpur F.P. School	Kripalpur
IX/9	86	Malatipur Purba Para	Malatipur F.P. School	Kripalpur
X/10	87	Malatipur Uttar Para	Malatipur F.P. School	Malatipur
XI/11	88	Malatipur Dakshin Para	Malatipur F.P. School	Malatipur
XII/12	89	Malatipur Station Para	Malatipur 88 No ICDS Center	Malatipur
XIII/13	90	NIL	Komrabad F.P. School	Komrabad
XIV/14	91	Kripalpur Daspara	Kripalpur Daspara ICDS Center	Kripalpur
XV/15	92	Dakshin Kripalpur	Dakshin Kripalpur F.P. School	Kripalpur
XVI/16	93	Chaita Dakshin Para	Chaita F.P. School	Chaita
XVII/17	94	Chaita Purba Para	Chaita F.P. School	Chaita
XVIII/18	95	Kendua Dakshin Para	Kendua F. P. School	Kendua
XIX/19	96	Kendua Purba Para	Kendua F. P. School	Kendua
XX/20	97	Kendua Uttar Para, Lalpolly, Thakurtala	Jatindranath F. P. School	Kendua
XXI/21	98	Ghona Uttar Para	Uttar Ghona F.P. School	Ghona
XXII/22	99	Jagatpur Paschim Para	Jagatpur F.P. School	Jagatpur
XXIII/23	100	Jagatpur Purba Para	Jagatpur F.P. School	Jagatpur
XXIV/24	101	Ghona Paschim Para	Ghona F.P. School	Ghona
XXV/25	102	Ghona Purba Para	Ghona F.P. School	Ghona

Panchayat Samiti seats at Chaita Gram Panchayat

Panchayat Samiti	Seat Name	Polling Station No.	Type
Basirhat II	P.S-13	78,79,80,81,82,83,84,85	Open
Basirhat II	P.S-14	86,87,88,89,90,91,92,93	Open
Basirhat II	P.S-15	94,95,96,97,98,99,100,101,102	Open

Zilla Parishad seats at Chaita Gram Panchayat

Zilla Parishad	Seat Name	Polling Station No.	Type
North 24 Parganas	Z.P-59	78,79,80,81,82,83,84,85,86,87,88,89, 90,91,92,93,94,95,96,97,98,99,100,101,102	Open

== Demographics ==
According to the 2011 Census of India, Chaita had a total population of 2,390, of which 1,215 were males and 1,175 were females.

In Chaita village population of children with age 0-6 is 331 which makes up 13.85% of total population of village. Average Sex Ratio of Chaita village is 967 which is higher than West Bengal state average of 950. Child Sex Ratio for the Chaita as per census is 1006, higher than West Bengal average of 956.

Chaita village has lower literacy rate compared to West Bengal. In 2011, literacy rate of Chaita village was 57.94% compared to 76.26% of West Bengal. In Chaita Male literacy stands at 59.14% while female literacy rate was 56.69%.

== Education ==
Colleges nearest to Chaita

- Chandraketugarh Sahidullah Smriti Mahavidyalaya
- Taki Government College
- Basirhat College

High schools nearest to Chaita

- Kaderia High Madrasa
- Malatipur High School
- Gopalpur Popular Academy
- Gopalpur Girl's High School

== Transport ==
Malatipur is the nearest railway station of Chaita. Haroa - Gopalpur More road (STATE HIGHWAY NO 03) passed through edge of this village.
