= Champapukur =

Champapukur Chanpa Pukhuria
- Village
- Location in West Bengal, India Champapukur (India)
- Coordinates: 22.657151°N 88.813128°E
- Country: India
- State: West Bengal
- District: North 24 Parganas
- Block: Basirhat II

Government
  - Panchayat Pradhan: Sapna Saha
  - MP: Vacant
  - MLA: Rafiqul Islam

Population (2011)
  - Total: 5,738

Languages
  - Official: Bengali, English
- Time zone: UTC+5:30 (IST)
- PIN: 743291
- Telephone code: 03217
- ISO 3166 code: IN-WB
- Vehicle registration: WB26
- Lok Sabha constituency: Basirhat
- Vidhan Sabha constituency: Basirhat Uttar
- Website: north24parganas.nic.in

Champapukur (also known as Chanpa Pukhuria) is a village and a gram panchayat in Basirhat II CD Block in Basirhat subdivision of North 24 Parganas district, West Bengal, India.

== Etymology ==
Champapukur is named after a pond which even today is at the heart of the village.

== Geography ==
Champapukur is located in the Ganges Brahmaputra delta region in the district of North 24 parganas, West Bengal state in the eastern India. The Bangladesh border - at Taki is situated about 20 km from here.

The average altitude is 11 metres. Ichamati River at Basirhat is just 6 km from here. Also Champapukur have many ponds.

Champapukur is 58 km from Sealdah Station on the Sealdah–Hasnabad line of Eastern Railway.

=== Climate ===
The climate is tropical — like the rest of the Gangetic West Bengal. The hallmark is the Monsoon — from early June to mid September. The weather remains dry during the winter (mid November to mid February) and humid during summer.

Temperature :41 °C in May (Maximum) and 10 °C in January (Minimum)

Relative Humidity: Between 50% in March & 90% in July

Rainfall: 1,579mm(Normal)

=== Amenities ===
Amenities in the village include schools, library, post office, telephone, mobile network, cable network and a bank. It has a playground.

== Demographics ==
As per the 2011 Census of India, Chanpa Pukhuria had a total population of 5,738, of which 2,948 (51%) were males and 2,790 (49%) were females. Population below 6 years was 659. The total number of literates in Chanpa Pukhuria was 3,990 (78.56% of the population over 6 years).

== Economy ==
The main economic industry is agriculture. Although some people are associated in government service and business.

== Major Points ==
Hatkhola: Hatkhola is the prime market here. People gather here, play cards make an amicable atmosphere.
Champapukur Rail Gate: This is another junction of rail station and many other para roads.
Rajapur is a nearby market where all kinds of necessary commodities are available.

== Transport ==
=== Road ===
Champapukur is communicated with Basirhat in the east, Kholapota at the north and Malancha at south. The Taki Road (SH 35) is just 2 km from here.

=== Rail ===
Champapukur is also connected by railways. This is a station of Hasnabad-Basirhat line of Kolkata Suburban Railway.

== Culture ==
The main feature one can find in this village is the bonding among the people. Durga Puja and Kali Puja are the main festival here. Apart from that there is a Basanti Puja, Neel Puja. Saraswati puja is also very famous. People of age 8 to 80 participate in the puja and enjoy at their best. The main thing is that there is no religious bar on those festivals, people from all communities, castes, religions can enjoy the festival with great commitment and harmony.

Hazratalar Mela (Charok Mela) is an old religious gathering held on penultimate day of Bengali month Chaitra (Mid of April each year). People from various community come from many parts of Bengal to dedicate their puja for Lord Shiva.

== Sports ==
Football and Cricket are popular games played here. CSA organizes football tournament each year where many teams from Basirhat to Kolkata participate.

=== Clubs ===
- C.S.A. is the most familiar club here.
- Rakhisangha is another familiar club.

== Education ==
=== Schools ===
The schools are either run by the state government or by private organisations. Schools mainly use English or Bengali as the medium of instruction. The schools are affiliated to WBBSE, WBCHSE and Cisce.

- Champapukur High Secondary Vidyalaya (WBCHSE, Bengali)
- New Age Public School. (CISCE)

=== College ===
Basirhat Mahabodhi College of Education: This B.Ed. college is privately run college and is affiliated with WUUttepa.
Basirhat College is only 5 km from here.
