= Kendua, North 24 Parganas =

Kendua
- Village
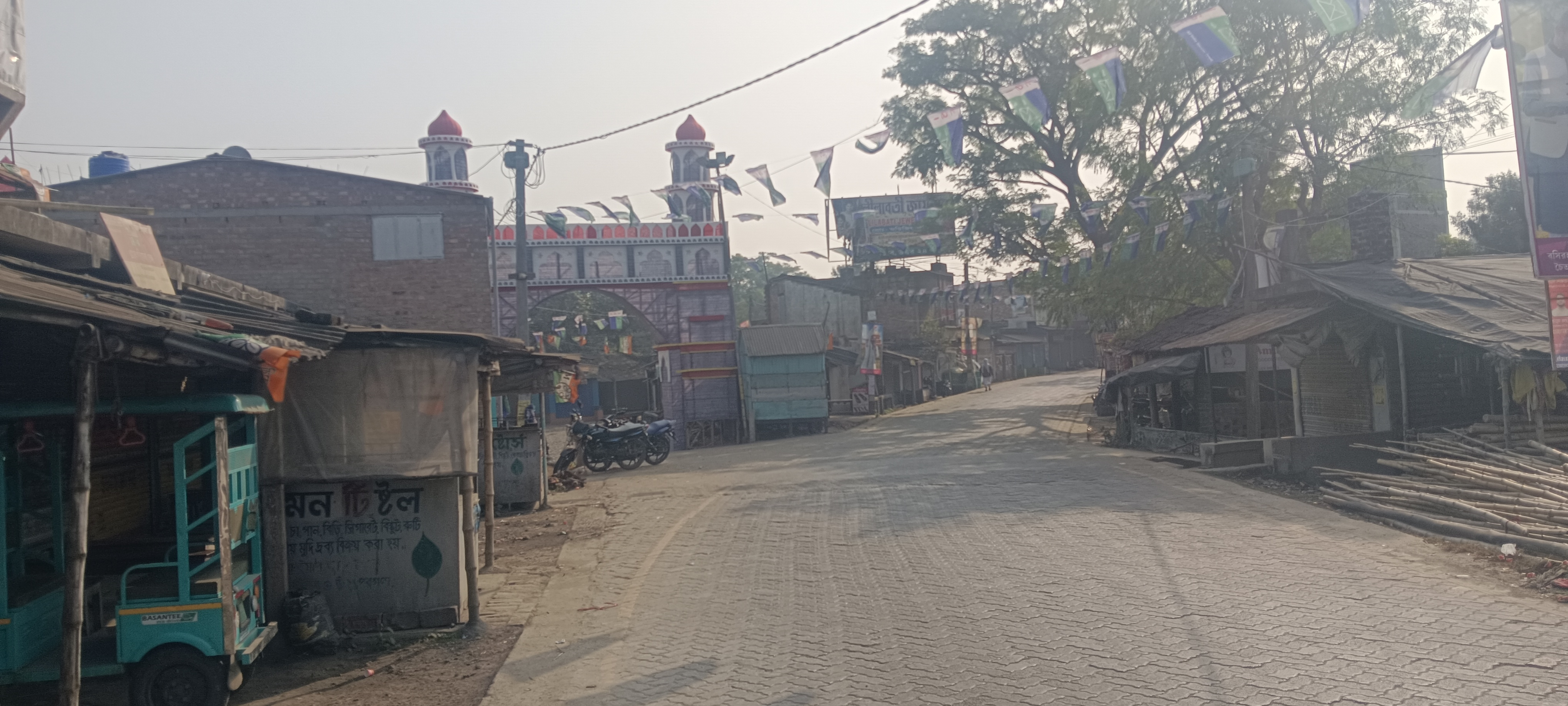
- Kendua Trimohini Market

- Location in West Bengal, India Kendua (India)
- Coordinates: 22.631735°N 88.751847°E
- Country: India
- State: West Bengal
- District: North 24 Parganas

Government
  - Type: Panchayath
  - Body: Chaita gram panchayat

Population (2011)
  - Total: 1,018

Languages
  - Official: Bengali, English
- Time zone: UTC+5:30 (IST)
- PIN: 743445
- Telephone/STD code: 03217
- Lok Sabha constituency: Basirhat
- Vidhan Sabha constituency: Basirhat Uttar
- Website: north24parganas.nic.in

Kendua is a village in Basirhat II CD Block in Basirhat subdivision of North 24 Parganas district, West Bengal, India.

== Geography ==
Kendua is situated in the Ganges Brahmaputra delta of West Bengal, about 25 km from the Bangladesh border and 50 km from Kolkata, capital of the West Bengal.

== Demographics ==
According to the 2011 Census of India, Kendua had a total population of 1,018, of which 545 were males and 473 were females.

== Economy ==
Many villagers work in the fishery business. Kendua fish market is an important fish market in Basirhat. Traders from Dum Dum, Nagerbazar come here and buy fish.

== Education ==
Primary school at Kendua

- Lalpolly Sishu Shiksha Kendra
- Kendua Free Primary School
- Jatindranath Free Primary School

High schools nearest to Kendua

- Malatipur High School
- Gopalpur Popular Academy
- Gopalpur Girl's High School

Colleges nearest to Kendua

- Chandraketugarh Sahidullah Smriti Mahavidyalaya
- Taki Government College
- Basirhat College

== Transport ==
Malatipur is the nearest railway station of Kendua. Haroa - Gopalpur More road (State Highway 3) passed through edge of this village.
