= Haroa =

Haroa may refer to several places:

- Haroa (community development block), a community development block in North 24 Parganas district, West Bengal, India
- Haroa (Vidhan Sabha constituency), an assembly constituency in North 24 Parganas district, West Bengal, India
- Haroa, North 24 Parganas, village in West Bengal, India
- Haroa River, in India
- Haroa, Fiji a village of Motusa in Fiji
