= Kachua =

Kachua may refer to:

- Kachua, West Bengal, village in West Bengal, India
- Kachua, Bangladesh, village in Bangladesh
