= Raghunathpur, North 24 Parganas =

Raghunathpur
- Census Town
- Location in West Bengal, India Raghunathpur (India)
- Coordinates: 22.685232°N 88.833567°E
- Country: India
- State: West Bengal
- District: North 24 Parganas

Area
  - Total: 2.0824 km^{2} (0.8040 sq mi)

Population (2011)
  - Total: 5,339
  - Density: 2,564/km^{2} (6,640/sq mi)

Languages
  - Official: Bengali, English
- Time zone: UTC+5:30 (IST)
- PIN: 743411
- Telephone code: 03217
- Vehicle registration: WB
- Lok Sabha constituency: Basirhat
- Vidhan Sabha constituency: Basirhat Uttar

Raghunathpur is a census town in the Basirhat II CD block in the Basirhat subdivision of the North 24 Parganas district in the state of West Bengal, India.

== Geography ==
Cities, towns and locations in Basirhat subdivision, North 24 Parganas district
M: municipal town, CT: census town, R: rural/ urban centre
Owing to space constraints in the small map, the actual locations in a larger map may vary slightly

=== Location ===
Raghunathpur is located at 22.685232°N 88.833567°E.

=== Area overview ===
The area shown in the map is a part of the Ichhamati-Raimangal Plain, located in the lower Ganges Delta. It contains soil of mature black or brownish loam to recent alluvium. Numerous rivers, creeks and khals criss-cross the area. The tip of the Sundarbans National Park is visible in the lower part of the map (shown in green but not marked). The larger full screen map shows the full forest area. A large section of the area is a part of the Sundarbans settlements. The densely populated area is an overwhelmingly rural area. Only 12.96% of the population lives in the urban areas and 87.04% of the population lives in the rural areas.

Note: The map alongside presents some of the notable locations in the subdivision. All places marked in the map are linked in the larger full screen map.

== Demographics ==
According to the 2011 Census of India, Raghunathpur (P) had a total population of 5,339, of which 2,753 (52%) were males and 2,586 (48%) were females. Population in the age range 0–6 years was 523. The total number of literate persons in Raghunathpur (P) was 4,295 (89.18% of the population over 6 years).

== Infrastructure ==
According to the District Census Handbook, North Twenty Four Parganas, 2011, Raghunathpur covers an area of 2.0824 km^{2}. It has 1.5 km roads with both open and closed drains. The protected water supply involves overhead tanks, service reservoir, tap water from untreated sources, and tube well/bore well. It has 1,050 domestic electric connections. Among the educational facilities, it has four primary schools and two senior secondary schools. The nearest college was 3 km away at Basirhat. It had three non-formal education centres (Sarvya Shiksha Abhiyan) and one special school for the disabled. Among the social, cultural and recreational facilities, it had two auditoriums/community halls. It is well-known for gamcha, handloom products, and feed.
