= Kachua, West Bengal =

Kachua Kachua Swarupnagar
- Village
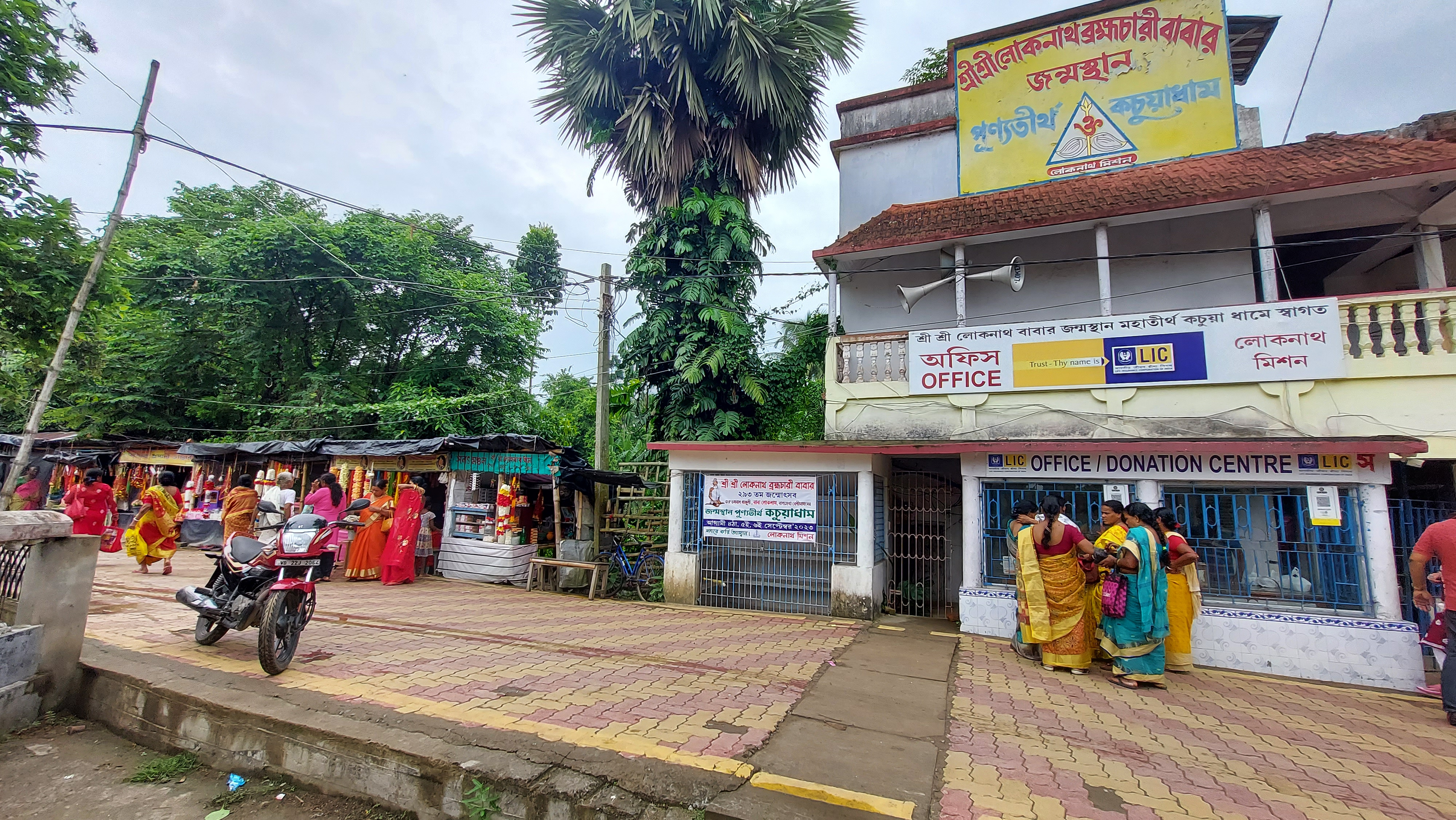
- Streets of Kachua, near the Kachua Lokenath Mission

- Location in West Bengal, India Kachua (India)
- Coordinates: 22.681261°N 88.725222°E
- Country: India
- State: West Bengal
- District: North 24 parganas
- Block: Basirhat II

Population (2011)
  - Total: 8,383

Languages
  - Official: Bengali, English
- Time zone: UTC+5:30 (IST)
- PIN: 743424
- Telephone code: 03217
- ISO 3166 code: IN-WB
- Vehicle registration: WB26
- Lok Sabha constituency: Basirhat
- Vidhan Sabha constituency: Basirhat Uttar
- Website: north24parganas.nic.in

Kachua (also known as Kachua Swarupnagar) is a village and a gram panchayat in Basirhat II CD Block in Basirhat subdivision of North 24 Parganas district, West Bengal, India.

== Geography ==
=== Location ===
Kachua is located 30 km from the state capital city Kolkata. It is located in the Basirhat II Block in North 24 Parganas district in the state of West Bengal, India. The surrounding nearby villages and its distance from Kachua are Dhanyakuria 2.4 km, Kholapota 8.6 km.

=== Area overview ===
According to land area calculations, the Kachua village is approximately 84.5 hectares large. Since Kachua falls under the block of Basirhat II as graded by Ministry of Jal Shakti in 2021, it does not have a water supply scheme. According to the same report, a number of water sources in the village are contaminated by arsenic, and should be analysed before use and crops with low water requirement can be grown in the area.

== Demographics ==
According to the 2011 Census of India, Kachua Swarupnagar had a total population of 8,383, of which 4,300 were males and 4,083 were females.

== Civic administration ==
When it comes to administration, Kachua village is administrated by a sarpanch who is elected representative of the village by the local elections. The sarpanch of Kachua is Najmin Ferdausi. Kachua falls under the State Legislative Assembly of Basirhat Uttar Constituency headed by Md. Tauseffur Rahman and under the Lok Sabha Constituency of Basirhat headed by TMC Member of Parliament Nusrat Jahan.

== Religious significance and controversy ==
Kachua is often referred to as 'Kachuadham' and is considered the birthplace of the Hindu Yogi Lokenath Brahmachari. It also consists of the temple compound around the birthplace, a holy pond and the Lokenath Mission - that is responsible for the administration of the temple grounds. Besides the Lokenath Temple, it even has a temple dedicated to Krishna and Radha Gobinda.

On 23 August 2019, on the eve of Janmashtami event, an accident happened, where an old wall broke off leading to a stampede, on devotees of Lokenath Brahmachari, and led to the injury of 16 people. According to many reports, three people lost their lives in this incident too. According to a "The Indian Express" article, 5 people lost their lives that day.
