= Bhootteriki =

2025 Indian Bengali horror comedy series

- Release poster
- Genre: Comedy horror
- Written by: Kaushik Hafizee
- Screenplay by: Kaushik Hafizee
- Directed by: Kaushik Hafizee
- Creative director: Anirban Bhattacharya
- Starring: Avery Singha Roy; Dipanwita Sarkar; Aishwarya Sen
- Composers: Debraj Bhattacharya; Ujan Chatterjee
- Country of origin: India
- Original language: Bengali
- No. of seasons: 1
- No. of episodes: 5

Production
- Cinematography: Animesh Ghorui
- Editor: Sanglap Bhowmik
- Camera setup: Single-camera
- Production companies: Shree Venkatesh Films; Follow Focus Films

Original release
- Release: 2025 – present

Bhootteriki is a 2025 Indian Bengali horror comedy web series directed by Kaushik Hafizee. Written by Kaushik Hafizee, the series has been produced under the banner of Follow Focus Films. Anirban Bhattacharya served as the creative director for the series. The series stars Avery Singha Roy, Dipanwita Sarkar and Aishwarya Sen in the lead roles while Durbar Sharma and Debraj Bhattacharya play other pivotal roles.

Most of the filming took place inside the Dhanyakuria castle. The music and the background score of the series has been done by Debraj Bhattacharya and Ujan Chatterjee. Animesh Ghorui did the cinematography while Sanglap Bhowmik handled the editing. The series follows a filmmaker who searches for real ghosts to make a documentary. The series was streamed on 12 September 2025, on Hoichoi.

== Synopsis ==
Independent filmmaker Sanjay Leela Banerjee and his crew begin filming a documentary about the everyday lives of ghosts after receiving permission from the All Bengal Ghost Association. At a haunted house, they encounter spirits from different eras - Bishnupriya, Razia, and Sukumari. As the documentary progresses, the ghosts reveal their routines, relationships, and social customs.

Razia maintains a relationship with Jayanta, a living man, while Kamlesh, a trainee ghost, falls in love with Sukumari. Their attempts to fulfil their personal desires through supernatural means lead to a series of humorous situations. The series further follows the interactions between the ghosts and the film crew as their personal stories gradually unfold.

== Cast ==
- Durbar Sharma as Sanjay Leela Banerjee, a freelancer director
- Avery Singha Roy as Bishnupriya, a 133 year old ghost, who died in 1890
- Dipanwita Sarkar as Razia, a 267 year old ghost, who died in 1759
- Aishwarya Sen as Sukumari, a 46 year old ghost, who died in 1978
- Sounak Kundu as Kamalesh, a 42 days old ghost, who died in 2025
- Debraj Bhattacharya as Jayanta, Razia's human lover
- Ratri Chatterjee as Jayanta's human wife
- Subhankar Ghatak
- Moitree Banerjee
- Pritesh Pattanayak

Cameo

- Swastika Mukherjee

== Episodes ==
No.	Title	Directed by	Written by	Original release date
1	"Gulgulla Habibulla"	Kaushik Hafizee	Kaushik Hafizee	September 12, 2025
2	"Dakatiya Hasi"	Kaushik Hafizee	Kaushik Hafizee	September 12, 2025
3	"Chumur Chap, Chaper Chumu"	Kaushik Hafizee	Kaushik Hafizee	September 12, 2025
4	"Hao mao khao, Director ke khao"	Kaushik Hafizee	Kaushik Hafizee	September 12, 2025
5	"Basa Bodol"	Kaushik Hafizee	Kaushik Hafizee	September 12, 2025

== Production ==
=== Development ===
Bhootteriki marked Kaushik Hafizee's web series debut. In 2022, Hafizee met Anirban Bhattacharya at the Kolkata International Film Festival. After Hafizee shared this idea, Bhattacharya showed interest and agreed to make it a web series. After a few months, the idea was finalized and Hafizee started writing the script. The concept announcement poster for the series was released on 16 August 2025. The first poster, featuring the lead actors and the release date, was dropped on 18 August 2025.

=== Filming ===
The filming started on 14 November 2024. Almost all the filming took place inside the Dhanyakuria castle, its premises and the surrounding forests. Few indoor scenes in the initial and final parts of the series has been shot in Kolkata.

== Soundtrack ==
Bhootteriki

Soundtrack album by Debraj Bhattacharya and Ujan Chatterjee
- Released: 2025
- Genre: Film soundtrack
- Length: 13:37
- Language: Bengali
- Label: SVF Music

Debraj Bhattacharya and Ujan Chatterjee has composed the music as well as the background score of the series. All the lyrics have been penned by Anirban Bhattacharya.

The first single "Teen Petnir Gaan" was released on 23 August 2025. It served as the title track for the web series. The second single "Party Song" was released on 29 August 2025. The music videos for the remaining tracks were released after the series was streamed. The third single "Rap Song" was dropped on 16 September 2025. The fourth single "Ekta Prem Kori" was released on 18 January 2026.

Track listing
No.	Title	Music	Singer(s)	Length
1.	"Teen Petnir Gaan"	Debraj Bhattacharya	Madhupourna Ganguly	3:33
2.	"Party Song"	Ujan Chatterjee, Anirban Bhattacharya	Aishwarya Roy	2:17
3.	"Rap Song"	Ujan Chatterjee, Debraj Bhattacharya	Anirban Bhattacharya	4:28
4.	"Ekta Prem Kori"	Debraj Bhattacharya	Jhinuk Basu, Debraj Bhattacharya	3:19
Total length:				13:37

== Marketing ==
The trailer for Bhootteriki was released on 6 September 2025. A "Mock Film" introducing the characters was released on 20 August 2025. A video titled "Welcome to Adhunik Bhoot Proshikkhon Kendra" was dropped on 4 September 2025. An "Inside Look" video, featuring Anirban Bhattacharya, the creative director of the series, was released on 14 September 2025.

== Reception ==
=== Critical reception ===
A critic from Binged rated the series 6/10 stars and wrote "Bhootteriki’s light-hearted treatment is its greatest asset, helping it convey poignant thoughts about love, companionship, and desire with an unmistakable breeziness." The cinematography, editing, music, premise, performance of the ensemble cast and the comic-book texture but bemoaned the excessive subplots and faltering script in certain sequences.

Archi Sengupta of Leisure Byte rated the series 2/5 stars and opined "The series brings literally nothing new to the table, and everything seems to be a variation of other (better) horror comedies that we have watched over the years." She praised the cast's performances and showcasing of the ghosts' lives but heavily criticized the old troupe of horror films, lack of proper horror, not so funny humour and futile cameos.

Snigdha Dey of Aajkal reviewed the series and noted "The teaser or trailer left quite a mark. It seemed like something amazing was in store. But the expectations were not fulfilled." She appreciated the satirical dialogues, songs, cinematography, visual effects and background music but bemoaned the heavy influence from Bhooter Bhabishyat, slow pace in the initial episodes, lack of proper backstory for the ghost of Bishnupriya, unnecessary portrayal of excessive sexual needs of the ghosts, needless slangs used throughout the series and illogical ancient cuss words spoken by the ghosts.
