= Matia =

Matia may refer to:

- Matia gens, an ancient Roman family
- Matia Island, a part of the San Juan Islands
- Matia, North 24 Parganas, village with a police station
- Matia, a clan of the Bharwad people of India

== People with the name ==
- Matia Chowdhury (1942-2024), Bangladeshi politician
- Matia Karrell, American film, television and screenwriter
- Matia Kasaija (born 1944), Ugandan politician
- Paul Ramon Matia (born 1937), United States federal judge
