= Matia, North 24 Parganas =

Matia
- Village
- Location in West Bengal, India Matia (India)
- Coordinates: 22.692409°N 88.771043°E
- Country: India
- State: West Bengal
- District: North 24 Parganas

Population (2011)
  - Total: 4,579

Languages
  - Official: Bengali, English
- Time zone: UTC+5:30 (IST)
- PIN: 743437 (Matia)
- Telephone/STD code: 03217
- Lok Sabha constituency: Basirhat
- Vidhan Sabha constituency: Basirhat Uttar
- Website: north24parganas.nic.in

Matia is a village in the Basirhat II CD block in the Basirhat subdivision of the North 24 Parganas district in the state of West Bengal, India.

== Geography ==
Cities, towns and locations in Basirhat subdivision, North 24 Parganas district
M: municipal town, CT: census town, R: rural/ urban centre
Owing to space constraints in the small map, the actual locations in a larger map may vary slightly

=== Location ===
Matia is located at 22.692409°N 88.771043°E.

=== Area overview ===
The area shown in the map is a part of the Ichhamati-Raimangal Plain, located in the lower Ganges Delta. It contains soil of mature black or brownish loam to recent alluvium. Numerous rivers, creeks and khals criss-cross the area. The tip of the Sundarbans National Park is visible in the lower part of the map (shown in green but not marked). The larger full screen map shows the full forest area. A large section of the area is a part of the Sundarbans settlements. The densely populated area is an overwhelmingly rural area. Only 12.96% of the population lives in the urban areas and 87.04% of the population lives in the rural areas.

Note: The map alongside presents some of the notable locations in the subdivision. All places marked in the map are linked in the larger full screen map.

== Civic administration ==
=== Police station ===
Matia police station is located in Matia village.

== Social concerns ==
Matia has a 150-years old red-light area. Ambia Hossain, a local resident, has organised a coaching centre for the children of the red-light area and Hossain’s organisation, Basirhat Subdivision Environment and Health Development Centre, is also making efforts to stop trafficking of women and children.

== Demographics ==
According to the 2011 Census of India, Matia had a total population of 4,579, of which 2,317 (51%) were males and 2,162 (49%) were females. Population inte age range 0–6 years was 525. The total number of literate persons in Matia was 3,191 (78.71% of the population over 6 years).

== Economy ==
Matia hat (market) is spread over 5 acres of land and sits on Sundays and Thursdays.

== Transport ==
State Highway 2 passes through Matia.
