= Kendua =

Kendua may refer to:

- Kendua, Tangail, Dhanbari Upazila, Tangail District, Bangladesh
- Kendua Upazila, an upazila in the Netrokona District of Dhaka, Bangladesh
- Kendua, West Bengal, a census town in Malda district, West Bengal, India
- Kendua, North 24 Parganas, a village in North 24 Parganas district, West Bengal, India
