= Rafikul Islam Mondal =

Indian politician

Member of the West Bengal Legislative Assembly
- In office 19 May 2016 – 4 May 2026
- Preceded by: ATM Abdullah
- Succeeded by: Md. Tauseef Rahman
- Constituency: Basirhat Uttar

Personal details
- Party: AITC
- Spouse: Ismatara Khatun
- Profession: Politician, Mentor

Rafikul Islam Mondal is an Indian politician member of All India Trinamool Congress. He is an MLA, elected from the Basirhat Uttar constituency in the 2016 West Bengal Legislative Assembly election as a Communist Party of India (Marxist) candidate. In 2021 assembly election he was re-elected from the same constituency as an All India Trinamool Congress candidate.
