= Md. Tauseef Rahman =

Indian politician (born 1991)

Mohammad Tauseef Rahman

Member of the West Bengal Legislative Assembly
- Incumbent
- Assumed office 4 May 2026
- Preceded by: Rafikul Islam Mondal
- Constituency: Basirhat Uttar

Personal details
- Party: All India Trinamool Congress (until 2026); Democratic Trinamool Congress (from 2026)
- Occupation: Politician

Mohammad Tauseef Rahman (born 1991) is an Indian politician from West Bengal. He is a member of the West Bengal Legislative Assembly from the Basirhat Uttar Assembly constituency in North 24 Parganas district representing the Democratic Trinamool Congress.

== Early life and education ==
Rahman is from Basirhat, North 24 Parganas district, West Bengal. He is the son of the late MD. Wasiur Rahman. He studied at St. Marys School, Kolkata and dropped out of Class 7 2004. He runs his own business. He declared assets worth Rs.20 lakhs in his affidavit to the Election Commission of India.

== Career ==
Rahman won the Basirhat Uttar Assembly constituency representing the All India Trinamool Congress in the 2026 West Bengal Legislative Assembly election. He polled 1,15,503 votes and defeated his nearest rival, Md. Musa Karemulla of the All India Secular Front, by a margin of 57,270 votes.
