= Dhanyakuria =

- Census Town
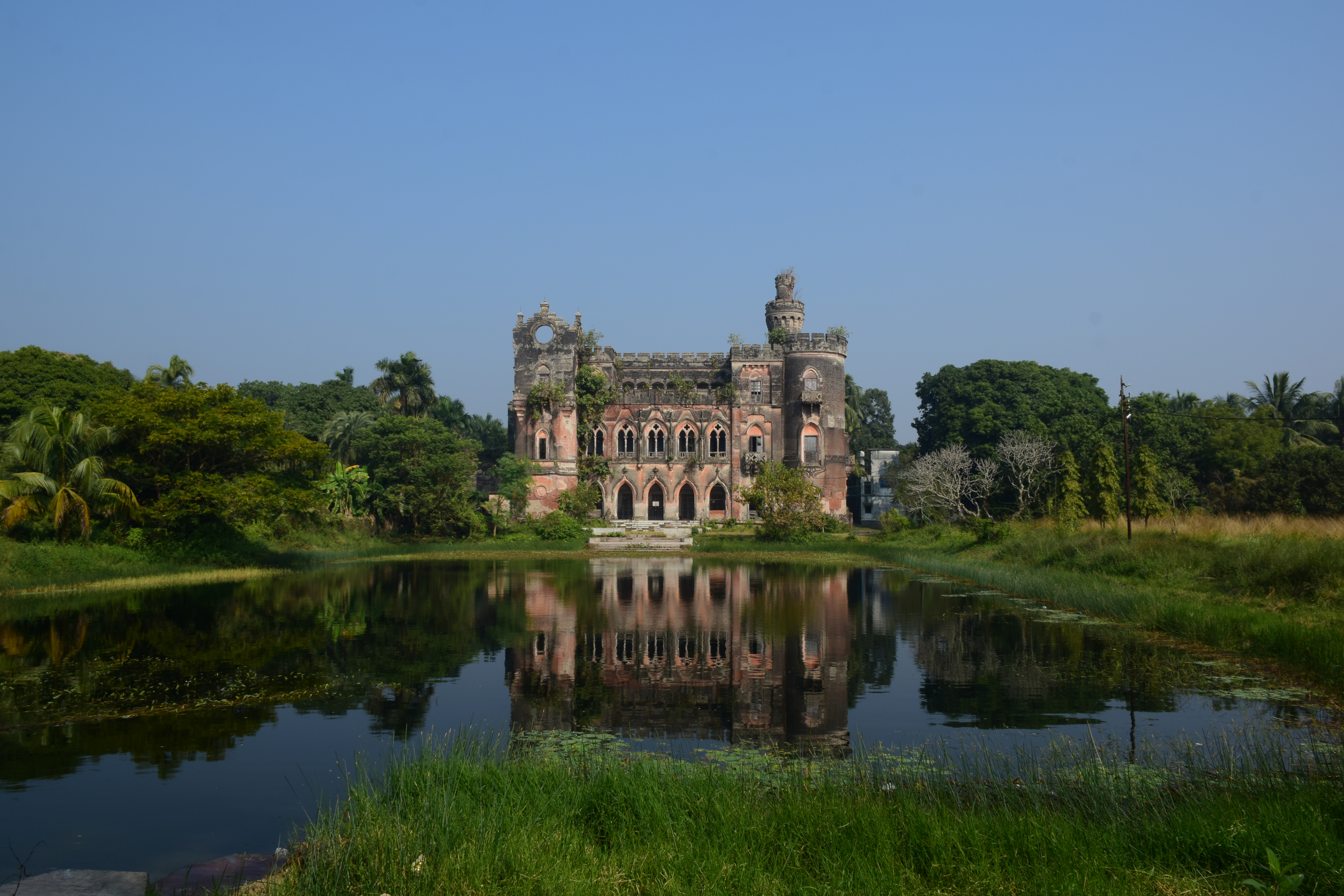
- Gain Castle in Dhanyakuria

- Location in West Bengal, India Dhanyakuria (India)
- Coordinates: 22.703409°N 88.757243°E
- Country: India
- State: West Bengal
- District: North 24 Parganas

Population (2011)
  - Total: 5,148

Languages
  - Official: Bengali, English
- Time zone: UTC+5:30 (IST)
- PIN: 743437
- Telephone code: 03217
- ISO 3166 code: IN-WB
- Vehicle registration: WB
- Lok Sabha constituency: Basirhat
- Vidhan Sabha constituency: Basirhat Uttar
- Website: north24parganas.gov.in

Dhanyakuria is a census town in the Basirhat II CD block in the Basirhat subdivision in the North 24 Parganas district in the state of West Bengal, India.

The town is home to the Gain Castle, a prominent rajbari or mansion owned by the local Gain family which traces its ancestry to Mahendranath Gain, a wealthy 18th century Bengali Kayastha landowner from eastern Bengal.

== Geography ==
Cities, towns and locations in Basirhat subdivision, North 24 Parganas district
M: municipal town, CT: census town, R: rural/ urban centre
Owing to space constraints in the small map, the actual locations in a larger map may vary slightly

=== Location ===
Dhanyakuria is located at 22.703409°N 88.757243°E.

=== Area overview ===
The area shown in the map is a part of the Ichhamati-Raimangal Plain, located in the lower Ganges Delta. It contains soil of mature black or brownish loam to recent alluvium. Numerous rivers, creeks and khals criss-cross the area. The tip of the Sundarbans National Park is visible in the lower part of the map (shown in green but not marked). The larger full screen map shows the full forest area. A large section of the area is a part of the Sundarbans settlements. The densely populated area is an overwhelmingly rural area. Only 12.96% of the population lives in the urban areas and 87.04% of the population lives in the rural areas.

Note: The map alongside presents some of the notable locations in the subdivision. All places marked in the map are linked in the larger full screen map.

== Demographics ==
According to the 2011 Census of India Dhanyakuria had a total population of 5,148, of which 2,640 (51%) were males and 2,508 (49%) were females. Population in the age range 0–6 years was 415. The total number of literate persons in Dhanyakuria was 4,069 (85.97% of the population over 6 years).

As of the 2001 India census, Dhanyakuria had a population of 4,168. Males constitute 51% of the population. Dhanyakuria has an average literacy rate of 75%, higher than the national average of 59.5%: male literacy is 81% and, female literacy is 68%. In Dhanyakuria, 10% of the population is under 6 years of age.

== Education ==
Dhanyakuri Higher Secondary School is a co-educational school.

== Healthcare ==
Dhanyakuria Rural Hospital at Dhanyakuria with 30 beds in the main medical facility in Basirhat II CD Block, there are primary health centres at Sikra Kulingram (with 6 beds) and Rajendrapur (with 10 beds).

North 24 Parganas district is one of the areas where groundwater is affected by arsenic contamination.
