= ATM Abdullah =

Bengali Indian politician

Member of the West Bengal Legislative Assembly
- In office 2011–2016
- Preceded by: Mostafa Bin Qaseem
- Succeeded by: Rafikul Islam Mondal
- Constituency: Basirhat Uttar

Personal details
- Born: Nehalpur, Basirhat, North 24 Parganas, India
- Party: All India Trinamool Congress
- Occupation: Politician

Abu Taher Mujahid Abdullah (Rony) (আবু তাহের মুজাহিদ আব্দুল্লাহ) is a Bengali Indian politician from the state of West Bengal. He was a member of the West Bengal Legislative Assembly (2011 by election – 2016). He became runner-up in the 2016 Vidhan Sabha Election from Basirhat Uttar Assembly.
