= Kachua, Bangladesh =

Kachua কচুয়া
- Village
- Location in Bangladesh Kachua (Bangladesh)
- Coordinates: 22.817873°N 90.123492°E
- Country: Bangladesh
- Division: Barisal Division
- District: Barisal District
- Upazila: Banaripara Upazila

Area
  - Total: 1.74 km^{2} (0.67 sq mi)

Population (2022)
  - Total: 2,142
  - Density: 1,230/km^{2} (3,190/sq mi)
- Time zone: UTC+6 (Bangladesh Time)

Kachua is a village in Banaripara Upazila of Barisal District in the Barisal Division of southern-central Bangladesh.

According to the 2022 Census of Bangladesh, Kachua had 550 households and a population of 2,142. It has a total area of 1.74 km^{2} (0.67 sq mi).
