= Hasnabad =

- Village
- Location in West Bengal, India Hasnabad (India)
- Coordinates: 22.577542°N 88.917362°E
- Country: India
- State: West Bengal
- District: North 24 Parganas

Population (2011)
  - Total: 3,412

Languages
  - Official: Bengali, English
- Time zone: UTC+5:30 (IST)
- PIN: 743426 (Hasnabad)
- Telephone/STD code: 03217
- Lok Sabha constituency: Basirhat
- Vidhan Sabha constituency: Hingalganj
- Website: north24parganas.nic.in

Hasnabad is a village and a gram panchayat in the Hasnabad CD block in the Basirhat subdivision of the North 24 Parganas district in the state of West Bengal, India. It is also known as The Gateway of the Sundarbans of North 24 PGS.

== Geography ==
Cities, towns and locations in Basirhat subdivision, North 24 Parganas district
M: municipal town, CT: census town, R: rural/ urban centre
Owing to space constraints in the small map, the actual locations in a larger map may vary slightly

=== Location ===
Hasnabad is located at 22.577542°N 88.917362°E.

The Ichhamati, the second most important river in the district after the Hooghly "flows south easterly meandering course over C.D. Blocks like Bagda, Bongaon and Basirhat-I and Basirhat-II and thus forms the international boundary with Bangladesh." It finally meets the Raimangal further south.

=== Area overview ===
The area shown in the map is a part of the Ichhamati-Raimangal Plain, located in the lower Ganges Delta. It contains soil of mature black or brownish loam to recent alluvium. Numerous rivers, creeks and khals criss-cross the area. The tip of the Sundarbans National Park is visible in the lower part of the map (shown in green but not marked). The larger full screen map shows the full forest area. A large section of the area is a part of the Sundarbans settlements. The densely populated area is an overwhelmingly rural area. Only 12.96% of the population lives in the urban areas and 87.04% of the population lives in the rural areas.

Note: The map alongside presents some of the notable locations in the subdivision. All places marked in the map are linked in the larger full screen map.

== Civic administration ==
=== Police station ===
Hasnabad police station covers an area of 295 km^{2} and serves a population of 218,520. It has jurisdiction over Taki municipality and Hasnabad CD block. There is a town out-post at Rajbari. It has a riverine border of 28 km, out of which 27 km is unfenced.

=== CD block HQ ===
The headquarters of Hasnabad CD block are located at Hasnabasd village.

== Demographics ==
Guarding a Riverine Border

Hasnabad is right on the border with Bangladesh. The meandering Ichhamati forms the riverine border. Guarding such a border is laced with many challenges: Bangladeshi infiltrators, armed cattle smugglers, human traffickers….The Border Security Force is now (2015) using floating border outposts, which coordinate with their pickets set across the river bank. Each floating outpost is crewed by 34 specially trained BSF personnel and are provided with the latest electronic surveillance gadgets and speed boats. More such floating outposts are being added to provide BSF with a strategic edge in guarding a porous border in one of the most thickly populated regions of the world.

=== Population ===
According to the 2011 Census of India, Hasnabad had a total population of 3,412, of which 1.863 (55%) were males and 1,549 (45%) were females. Population in the age rage 0–6 years was 320. The total number of literate persons in Hasnabad was 2,642 (85.45% of the population over 6 years).

== Transport ==
Hasnabad railway station is the terminus of the Barasat-Hasnabad line, which is part the Kolkata Suburban Railway railway system.

State Highway 2 passes through Hasnabad.

The 684 m long bridge across the Katakhali at Hasnabad was opened to public in March 2019, linking Hingalganj with Hasnabad. Lebukhali, the last point up to which motorised transport (except 2 wheeler) can reach is now directly connected to Kolkata and other places.

== Education ==
Taki Government College at Taki is located nearby.

== Healthcare ==
Hasnabad Matri Sadan with 6 beds is located at Hasnabad.
