= Haroa (community development block) =

- Community development block
- Interactive map of Haroa
- Coordinates: 22.5983617°N 88.6794090°E
- Country: India
- State: West Bengal
- District: North 24 Parganas

Government
  - Type: Representative democracy

Area
  - Total: 152.73 km^{2} (58.97 sq mi)
- Elevation: 7 m (23 ft)

Population (2011)
  - Total: 214,401
  - Density: 1,403.8/km^{2} (3,635.8/sq mi)

Languages
  - Official: Bengali, English

Literacy (2011)
  - Total literates: 136,679 (73.13%)
- Time zone: UTC+5:30 (IST)
- PIN: 743425 (Haroa)
- Telephone/STD code: 03217
- ISO 3166 code: IN-WB
- Vehicle registration: WB-23, WB-24, WB-25, WB-26
- Lok Sabha constituency: Basirhat
- Vidhan Sabha constituency: Haroa, Minakhan
- Website: north24parganas.nic.in

Haroa is a community development block that forms an administrative division in Basirhat subdivision of North 24 Parganas district in the Indian state of West Bengal.

== Geography ==
Haroa is located at 22°35′54″N 88°40′46″E.

Haroa CD Block is bounded by Deganga and Basirhat II CD Blocks in the north, Basirhat I and Minakhan CD Blocks in the east, Bhangar II CD Block in South 24 Parganas district in the south and Barasat II CD Block in the west.

Haroa CD Block is part of the North Bidyadhari Plain, one of the three physiographic regions in the district located in the lower Ganges Delta. The area is full of marshes and salt water lakes. The Bidyadhari has a long course through the central part of the district.

Haroa CD Block has an area of 152.73 km^{2}. It has 1 panchayat samity, 8 gram panchayats, 118 gram sansads (village councils), 90 mouzas and 90 inhabited villages. Haroa police station serves this block. Headquarters of this CD Block is at Haroa.

Gram panchayats of Haroa block/ panchayat samiti are: Bakjuri, Haroa, Shalipur, Gopalpur I, Khasbalanda, Sonapukur Sankarpur, Gopalpur II and Kulti.

=== Sundarbans ===
The Sundarbans is a flat lowland susceptible to tidal waves along the 260 km shoreline of the Bay of Bengal. The total expanse of Sundarbans is about 2.05 million hectares (8,000 square miles). Of this, only 0.42 million hectares (1,629 square miles or 10,43,000 acres) are under the reserve forests including about 0.19 million hectares covered by creeks and channels. The area is prone to natural calamities such as cyclones, thunderstorms with occasional hail and floods. There are more than 63,400 km of embankments but the floods caused by high tidal bores, often wash away much of the embankments, already weakened and broken by earlier cyclonic storms.

In May 2009, the district was hit by high speed cyclone named Aila and subsequent rainfall which continued for two days. This created a disaster in 20 out of 22 blocks of the district. 10 out of 27 municipalities of the district were also severely affected.

Six CD Blocks of North 24 Parganas are included in the Sundabans area – Hingalganj, Hasnabad, Sandeskhali I and II, Minakhan and Haora. The south-eastern part of the district gradually merges into the Sunderbans.

== Demographics ==
=== Population ===
As per 2011 Census of India Haroa CD Block had a total population of 214,401, all of which were rural. There were 111,080 (52%) males and 103,321 (48%) females. Population below 6 years was 27,504. Scheduled Castes numbered 50,636 (23.62%) and Scheduled Tribes numbered 12,728 (5.94%).

As per 2001 census, Haroa block has a total population of 182,499 out of which 94,205 were males and 88,294 were females.

Large villages in Haroa CD Block (2011 census figures in brackets): Haripur (6,315), Kharupala (6,003), Mazampur (5,556), Shankarpur (4,364), Kamarganti (9,555), Laugachhi (4,540), Ranigachhi (5,947), Khas Balandar (9,046), Atghara (5,096), Kalikapur (4,378), Gobaria Abad (4,468), Dhantala (4,567), Gopalpur (10,864) and Jampur (4,863).

North 24 Parganas district is densely populated, mainly because of the influx of refugees from East Pakistan (later Bangladesh). With a density of population of 2,182 per km^{2} in 1971, it was 3rd in terms of density per km^{2} in West Bengal after Kolkata and Howrah, and 20th in India. According to the District Human Development Report: North 24 Parganas, “High density is also explained partly by the rapid growth of urbanization in the district. In 1991, the percentage of urban population in the district has been 51.23.”

Decadal Population Growth Rate (%)

View source data.

The decadal growth of population in Haroa CD Block in 2001-2011 was 17.47%. The decadal growth of population in Haroa CD Block in 1991-2001 was 20.80%.

The decadal growth rate of population in North 24 Parganas district was as follows: 47.9% in 1951-61, 34.5% in 1961-71, 31.4% in 1971-81, 31.7% in 1981-91, 22.7% in 1991-2001 and 12.0% in 2001-11. The decadal growth rate for West Bengal in 2001-11 was 13.93%. The decadal growth rate for West Bengal was 17.84% in 1991-2001, 24.73% in 1981-1991 and 23.17% in 1971-1981.

Only a small portion of the border with Bangladesh has been fenced and it is popularly referred to as a porous border. It is freely used by Bangladeshi infiltrators, terrorists, smugglers, criminals et al.

=== Literacy ===
As per the 2011 census, the total number of literates in Haroa CD Block was 136,679 (73.13% of the population over 6 years) out of which males numbered 75,747 (78.13% of the male population over 6 years) and females numbered 60,932 (67.75% of the female population over 6 years). The gender disparity (the difference between female and male literacy rates) was 10.38%.

See also – List of West Bengal districts ranked by literacy rate

Literacy in CD blocks of
North 24 Parganas district
Barasat Sadar subdivision
Amdanga – 80.69%
Deganga – 79.65%
Barasat I – 81.50%
Barasat II – 77.71%
Habra I – 83.15%
Habra II – 81.05%
Rajarhat – 83.13%
Basirhat subdivision
Baduria – 78.75%
Basirhat I – 72.10%
Basirhat II – 78.30%
Haroa – 73.13%
Hasnabad – 71.47%
Hingalganj – 76.85%
Minakhan – 71.33%
Sandeshkhali I – 71.08%
Sandeshkhali II – 70.96%
Swarupnagar – 77.57%
Bangaon subdivision
Bagdah – 75.30%
Bangaon – 79.71%
Gaighata – 82.32%
Barrackpore subdivision
Barrackpore I – 85.91%
Barrackpore II – 84.53%
Source: 2011 Census: CD Block Wise
Primary Census Abstract Data

=== Language and religion ===
Religion in Haroa CD block (2011)
Islam	61.12%
Hinduism	38.76%
Other or not stated	0.12%

In the 2011 census Muslims numbered 131,050 and formed 61.12% of the population in Haroa CD Block. Hindus numbered 83,088 and formed 38.76% of the population. Others numbered 263 and formed 0.12% of the population.

In 1981 Hindus numbered 72,291 and formed 53.67% of the population and Muslims numbered 61,852 and formed 46.13% of the population. In 1991 Hindus numbered 78,072 and formed 51.67% of the population and Muslims numbered 73,021 and formed 48.33% of the population in Haroa CD Block. (In 1981 and 1991 census was conducted as per jurisdiction of the police station). In 2001 in Haroa CD block Muslims were 105,938 (58.04%) and Hindus 76,436 (41.88%).

Bengali is the predominant language, spoken by 99.48% of the population.

== Rural Poverty ==
33.73% of households in Haroa CD Block lived below poverty line in 2001, against an average of 29.28% in North 24 Parganas district.

== Economy ==
=== Livelihood ===
Livelihood
in Haroa CD Block
1. Cultivators (15.2%)
2. Agricultural labourers (36.0%)
3. Household industries (4.79%)
4. Other Workers (44.0%)

In Haroa CD Block in 2011, amongst the class of total workers, cultivators numbered 11,128 and formed 15.19% of the total workers, agricultural labourers numbered 26,398 and formed 36.03%, household industry workers numbered 3,512 and formed 4.79% and other workers numbered 32,219 and formed 43.98%. Total workers numbered 73,257 and formed 34.17% of the total population, and non-workers numbered 141,144 and formed 65.83% of the population.

In more than 30 percent of the villages in North 24 Parganas, agriculture or household industry is no longer the major source of livelihood for the main workers there. The CD Blocks in the district can be classified as belonging to three categories: border areas, Sundarbans area and other rural areas. The percentage of other workers in the other rural areas category is considerably higher than those in the border areas and Sundarbans area.

Note: In the census records a person is considered a cultivator, if the person is engaged in cultivation/ supervision of land owned by self/government/institution. When a person who works on another person’s land for wages in cash or kind or share, is regarded as an agricultural labourer. Household industry is defined as an industry conducted by one or more members of the family within the household or village, and one that does not qualify for registration as a factory under the Factories Act. Other workers are persons engaged in some economic activity other than cultivators, agricultural labourers and household workers. It includes factory, mining, plantation, transport and office workers, those engaged in business and commerce, teachers, entertainment artistes and so on.

=== Infrastructure ===
There are 90 inhabited villages in Haroa CD Block. 100% villages have power supply and drinking water supply. 18 villages (20.00%) have post offices. 86 villages (95.56%) have telephones (including landlines, public call offices and mobile phones). 45 villages (50.00%) have a pucca approach road and 54 villages (60.00%) have transport communication (includes bus service, rail facility and navigable waterways). 11 villages (12.22%) have agricultural credit societies and 12 villages (13.33% ) have banks.

=== Agriculture ===
The North 24 Parganas district Human Development Report opines that in spite of agricultural productivity in North 24 Parganas district being rather impressive 81.84% of rural population suffered from shortage of food. With a high urbanisation of 54.3% in 2001, the land use pattern in the district is changing quite fast and the area under cultivation is declining. However, agriculture is still the major source of livelihood in the rural areas of the district.

From 1977 on wards major land reforms took place in West Bengal. Land in excess of land ceiling was acquired and distributed amongst the peasants. Following land reforms land ownership pattern has undergone transformation. In 2010-11, persons engaged in agriculture in Haroa CD Block could be classified as follows: bargadars 8,370 (13.29%), patta (document) holders 19,120 (30.37%), small farmers (possessing land between 1 and 2 hectares) 1,715 (2.72%), marginal farmers (possessing land up to 1 hectare) 14,715 (23.37%) and agricultural labourers 19,045 (30.25%).

Haroa CD Block had no fertiliser depot, no seed store and no fair price shop in 2010-11.

In 2010-11, Haroa CD Block produced 12,084 tonnes of Aman paddy, the main winter crop from 4,586 hectares, 502 tonnes of Boro paddy (spring crop) from 1,653 hectares, 192 tonnes of Aus paddy (summer crop) from 73 hectares, 211 tonnes of wheat from 78 hectares, 23 tonnes of maize from 9 hectares, 15,153 tonnes of jute from 788 hectares, 6,881 tonnes of potatoes from 191 hectares and 1,055 tonnes of sugar cane from 13 hectares. It also produced pulses and oilseeds.

In 2010-11, the total area irrigated in Haroa CD Block was 206 hectares, of which 68 hectares were irrigated by canal water, 120 hectares by river lift irrigation and 86 hectares by deep tube well.

=== Pisciculture ===
In 2010-11, the net area under effective pisciculture in Haroa CD Block was 8,668.61 hectares. 18,468 persons were engaged in the profession. Approximate annual production was 260,058.3 quintals.

=== Banking ===
In 2010-11, Haroa CD Block had offices of 6 commercial banks and 1 gramin bank.

== Transport ==
In 2010-11, Haroa CD Block had 3 ferry services and 7 originating/ terminating bus routes.

SH 3 passes through this CD Block.

== Education ==
In 2010–11, Haroa CD Block had 86 primary schools with 12,929 students, 5 high schools with 3,560 students and 8 higher secondary schools with 2,800 students. Haroa CD Block had 374 institutions for special and non-formal education with 17,096 students.

As per the 2011 census, in Haroa CD Block, amongst the 90 inhabited villages, 12 villages did not have a school, 15 villages had more than 1 primary school, 29 villages had at least 1 primary and 1 middle school and 11 villages had at least 1 middle and 1 secondary school.

== Healthcare ==
In 2011, Haroa CD Block had 1 block primary health centre and 2 primary health centres, with total 27 beds and 4 doctors (excluding private bodies). It had 29 family welfare subcentres. 3,906 patients were treated indoors and 70,491 patients were treated outdoor in the hospitals, health centres and subcentres of the CD Block.

Haroa (Adampur) Rural Hospital at Haroa with 30 beds functions as the main medical facility in Haroa CD Block. There are primary health centres at Gopalpur (with 10 beds) and Sonapukur (Kamarghanti PHC with 6 beds).

Haroa block is one of the areas where ground water is affected by arsenic contamination.
