= Basirhat II =

- Community development block
- Interactive map of Basirhat II
- Coordinates: 22.683409°N 88.815043°E
- Country: India
- State: West Bengal
- District: North 24 Parganas

Government
  - Type: Representative democracy

Area
  - Total: 132.54 km^{2} (51.17 sq mi)
- Elevation: 5 m (16 ft)

Population (2011)
  - Total: 226,130
  - Density: 1,706.1/km^{2} (4,418.8/sq mi)

Languages
  - Official: Bengali, English

Literacy (2011)
  - Total literates: 155,685 (78.30%)
- Time zone: UTC+5:30 (IST)
- PIN: 743428 (Kholapota); 743437 (Dhanyakuria); 743486 (Nehalpur); 743445 (Chaita)
- Telephone/STD code: 03217
- ISO 3166 code: IN-WB
- Vehicle registration: WB-23, WB-24, WB-25, WB-26
- Lok Sabha constituency: Basirhat
- Vidhan Sabha constituency: Basirhat Uttar
- Website: north24parganas.nic.in

Basirhat II is a community development block that forms an administrative division in Basirhat subdivision of North 24 Parganas district in the Indian state of West Bengal.

== Geography ==
Mathurapur, a census town in Basirhat II block, is located at 22°41′00″N 88°48′54″E.

Basirhat II CD Block is bounded by Baduria CD Block in the north, Basirhat I CD Block in the east, Haroa CD Block in the south and Deganga CD Block in the west. While Baduria municipality is in the north Basirhat municipality is in the east.

Basirhat II CD Block is part of the Ichhamati-Raimangal Plain, one of the three physiographic regions in the district located in the lower Ganges Delta. It contains soil of mature black or brownish loam to recent alluvium. The Ichhamati flows through the eastern part of the district. The Bidyadhari flows along the south-western border of the CD Block separating it from Haroa CD Block.

Basirhat II CD Block has an area of 127.42 km^{2}. It has 1 panchayat samity, 9 gram panchayats, 134 gram sansads (village councils), 69 mouzas and 68 inhabited villages. Basirhat police station serves this block, as per the District Statistical Handbook: North 24 Parganas. Headquarters of this CD Block is at Mathurapur.

Gram panchayats of Basirhat II block/ panchayat samiti are: Begumpur Bibipur, Dhanyakuria, Kholapota, Ghorarash Kulingram, Rajendrapur, Chaita, Shrinagar Matia, Champapukur and Kachua.

== Demographics ==
=== Population ===
As per 2011 Census of India Basirhat II CD Block had a total population of 226,130, of which 208,940 were rural and 17,209 were urban. There were 115,735 (51%) males and 110,395 (49%) females. Population below 6 years was 27,291. Scheduled Castes numbered 19,794 (8.75%) and Scheduled Tribes numbered 5,687 (2.51%).

As per 2001 census, Basirhat II CD block has a total population of 194,006 out of which 99,295 were males and 94,711 were females.

There are three census towns in Basirhat II CD Block (2011 census figures in brackets): Dhanyakuria (5,148), Mathurapur (6,803) and Raghunathpur (P) (5,339).

Large villages in Basirhat II block (2011 census figures in brackets): Eojnagar (11,051), Nehalpur (7,682), Begampur (6,923), Kachua Swarupnagar (8,383), Kripalpur (4,134), Sadiknagar (5,082) Srinagar (11,028), Matia (4,579), Sangbaria (4,452), Chanpa Pukhuria (5,738), Zafarpur (15,159), Ghona (5,763), Rajendrapur (10,417) and Tyntra Neora (4,070).

North 24 Parganas district is densely populated, mainly because of the influx of refugees from East Pakistan (later Bangladesh). With a density of population of 2,182 per km^{2} in 1971, it was 3rd in terms of density per km^{2} in West Bengal after Kolkata and Howrah, and 20th in India. According to the District Human Development Report: North 24 Parganas, “High density is also explained partly by the rapid growth of urbanization in the district. In 1991, the percentage of urban population in the district has been 51.23.”

Decadal Population Growth Rate (%)

The decadal growth of population in Basirhat II ICD Block in 2001-2011 was 16.55%. The decadal growth of population in Basirhat II CD Block in 1991-2001 was 18.31%.

The decadal growth rate of population in North 24 Parganas district was as follows: 47.9% in 1951-61, 34.5% in 1961-71, 31.4% in 1971-81, 31.7% in 1981-91, 22.7% in 1991-2001 and 12.0% in 2001-11. The decadal growth rate for West Bengal in 2001-11 was 13.93%. The decadal growth rate for West Bengal was 17.84% in 1991-2001, 24.73% in 1981-1991 and 23.17% in 1971-1981.

Only a small portion of the border with Bangladesh has been fenced and it is popularly referred to as a porous border. It is freely used by Bangladeshi infiltrators, terrorists, smugglers, criminals et al.

=== Literacy ===
As per the 2011 census, the total number of literates in Basirhat II CD Block was 155,685 (78.30% of the population over 6 years) out of which males numbered 83,196 (81.69% of the male population over 6 years) and females numbered 72,489 (74.73% of the female population over 6 years). The gender disparity (the difference between female and male literacy rates) was 6.96%. See also – List of West Bengal districts ranked by literacy rate

Literacy in CD blocks of
North 24 Parganas district
Barasat Sadar subdivision
Amdanga – 80.69%
Deganga – 79.65%
Barasat I – 81.50%
Barasat II – 77.71%
Habra I – 83.15%
Habra II – 81.05%
Rajarhat – 83.13%
Basirhat subdivision
Baduria – 78.75%
Basirhat I – 72.10%
Basirhat II – 78.30%
Haroa – 73.13%
Hasnabad – 71.47%
Hingalganj – 76.85%
Minakhan – 71.33%
Sandeshkhali I – 71.08%
Sandeshkhali II – 70.96%
Swarupnagar – 77.57%
Bangaon subdivision
Bagdah – 75.30%
Bangaon – 79.71%
Gaighata – 82.32%
Barrackpore subdivision
Barrackpore I – 85.91%
Barrackpore II – 84.53%
Source: 2011 Census: CD Block Wise
Primary Census Abstract Data

=== Language and religion ===
Religion in Basirhat II CD block (2011)
Islam	70.10%
Hinduism	29.67%
Other or not stated	0.23%

In the 2011 census Muslims numbered 158,514 and formed 70.10% of the population in Basirhat II CD Block. Hindus numbered 67,085 and formed 29.67% of the population. Others numbered 531 and formed 0.23% of the population.

In 1981 Muslims numbered 62,735 and formed 69.88% of the population and Hindus numbered 27,032 and formed 30.42% of the population in Basirhat I CD Block. In 1981 Hindus numbered 69,052 and formed 55.09% of the population and Muslims numbered 54,437 and formed 44.01% of the population in Basirhat II CD Block. In 1991 Muslims numbered 187,528 and formed 65.54% of the population and Hindus numbered 98,619 and formed 34.46% of the population in Basirhat I and Basirhat II CD Blocks taken together. (In 1981 and 1991 census was conducted as per jurisdiction of the police station). In 2001 in Baduria CD block Muslims were 133,527 (68.82%) and Hindus 60,316 (31.09%).

Bengali is the predominant language, spoken by 99.93% of the population.

== Rural Poverty ==
34.60% of households in Basirhat II CD Block lived below poverty line in 2001, against an average of 29.28% in North 24 Parganas district.

== Economy ==
=== Livelihood ===
Livelihood
in Basirhat II CD Block
1. Cultivators (11.3%)
2. Agricultural labourers (33.1%)
3. Household industries (5.68%)
4. Other Workers (49.9%)

In Basirhat II CD Block, amongst the class of total workers, cultivators numbered 8,826 and formed 11.31% of the total workers, agricultural labourers numbered 25,813 and formed 33.07%, household industry workers numbered 4,431and formed 5.68% and other workers numbered 38,981 and formed 49.94%. Total workers numbered 78,051 and formed 34.52% of the total population, and non-workers numbered 148,079 and formed 65.48% of the population.

In more than 30 percent of the villages in North 24 Parganas, agriculture or household industry is no longer the major source of livelihood for the main workers there. The CD Blocks in the district can be classified as belonging to three categories: border areas, Sundarbans area and other rural areas. The percentage of other workers in the other rural areas category is considerably higher than those in the border areas and Sundarbans area.

Note: In the census records a person is considered a cultivator, if the person is engaged in cultivation/ supervision of land owned by self/government/institution. When a person who works on another person’s land for wages in cash or kind or share, is regarded as an agricultural labourer. Household industry is defined as an industry conducted by one or more members of the family within the household or village, and one that does not qualify for registration as a factory under the Factories Act. Other workers are persons engaged in some economic activity other than cultivators, agricultural labourers and household workers. It includes factory, mining, plantation, transport and office workers, those engaged in business and commerce, teachers, entertainment artistes and so on.

=== Infrastructure ===
There are 66 inhabited villages in Basirhat II CD Block, as per the District Census Handbook: North 24 Parganas. 100% villages have power supply and drinking water supply. 19 villages (28.79%) have post offices. 63 villages (95.45%) have telephones (including landlines, public call offices and mobile phones). 32 villages (48.48%) have a pucca approach road and 27 villages (40.91%) have transport communication (includes bus service, rail facility and navigable waterways). 11 villages (16.67%) have agricultural credit societies and 16 villages (24.24% ) have banks.

=== Agriculture ===
The North 24 Parganas district Human Development Report opines that in spite of agricultural productivity in North 24 Parganas district being rather impressive 81.84% of rural population suffered from shortage of food. With a high urbanisation of 54.3% in 2001, the land use pattern in the district is changing quite fast and the area under cultivation is declining. However, agriculture is still the major source of livelihood in the rural areas of the district.

From 1977 on wards major land reforms took place in West Bengal. Land in excess of land ceiling was acquired and distributed amongst the peasants. Following land reforms land ownership pattern has undergone transformation. In 2010-11, persons engaged in agriculture in Basirhat II CD Block could be classified as follows: bargadars 3,109 (7.14%), patta (document) holders 6,633 (15.22%), small farmers (possessing land between 1 and 2 hectares) 2,020 (4.64%), marginal farmers (possessing land up to 1 hectare) 16,390 (37.62%) and agricultural labourers 15,418 (35.39%).

Basirhat II CD Block had 73 fertiliser depots, 28 seed stores and no fair price shop in 2010-11.

In 2010-11, Basirhat II CD Block produced 15,492 tonnes of Aman paddy, the main winter crop from 4,018 hectares, 8,886 tonnes of Boro paddy (spring crop) from 2,715 hectares, 26 tonnes of Aus paddy (summer crop) from 10 hectares, 154 tonnes of wheat from 57 hectares, 61,895 tonnes of jute from 2,746 hectares and 3,528 tonnes of potatoes from 142 hectares. It also produced pulses and oilseeds.

In Basirhat II CD Block in 2010-11, 139 hectares were irrigated by deep tube well.

=== Pisciculture ===
In 2010-11, the net area under effective pisciculture in Basirhat II CD Block was 3,629.81 hectares and 15,358 people were engaged in the profession. Approximate annual production was 108,894.3 quintals.

=== Banking ===
In 2010-11, Basirhat II CD Block had offices of 8 commercial bank and 1 gramin bank.

== Transport ==
SH 2 passes through this CD Block.

There are stations like - Malatipur railway station, Ghovarash Ghona railway station and Champapukur railway station on the Barasat-Hasnabad line.

== Education ==
In 2010-11, Basirhat II CD Block had 122 primary schools with 13,490 students, 1 middle school with 1,088 students, 10 high schools with 7,908 students and 9 higher secondary schools with 7,024 students. Basirhat II CD Block had 321 institutions for special and non-formal education with 16,820 students.

As per the 2011 census, in Basirhat II CD Block, amongst the 66 inhabited villages, 2 villages did not have a school, 30 villages had more than 1 primary school, 13 villages had at least 1 primary and 1 middle school and 8 villages had at least 1 middle and 1 secondary school.

== Healthcare ==
In 2011, Basirhat II CD Block had 1 block primary health centre and 2 primary health centres, with total 25 beds and 4 doctors (excluding private bodies). It had 27 family welfare subcentres. 2,575 patients were treated indoor and 124,132 patients were treated outdoor in the hospitals, health centres and subcentres of the CD Block.

Dhanyakuria Rural Hospital at Dhanyakuria with 30 beds in the main medical facility in Basirhat II CD Block, there are primary health centres at Sikra Kulingram (with 6 beds) and Rajendrapur (with 10 beds).

Basirhat II block is one of the areas where ground water is affected by arsenic contamination.
