= Basirhat College =

College in Basirhat, West Bengal, India

- Type: Undergraduate college & Post Graduate (Only Bengali)
- Established: 1947
- Affiliations: West Bengal State University
- Principal: Dr. Ashok Mondal
- Location: Basirhat, West Bengal, 743412, India; 22.670461°N 88.847810°E
- Campus: Urban
- Website: Basirhat College

- Location within West Bengal Location within India

Basirhat College, established in 1947, is a general degree college in Basirhat. It offers undergraduate courses in arts, commerce and sciences. It is affiliated to West Bengal State University.

== History ==
Basirhat College was founded in mid-November 1947 on the banks of river Icchamati. In 1947, the college was primarily housed in Basirhat Town Hall. It later moved to the residence of Khan Bahadur A.F.M. Abdur Rahaman in Basirhat. Dr. Shyamaprasad Mukherjee laid the foundation stone at the present location of the college.

Initially, there was one Faculty – Arts (Humanities) with 6 departments. Over time, the total number of departments increased to 16 departments. Two new departments, - Geography and Education were approved by the University of Calcutta & State Government in 2000 and 2001 respectively. Basirhat College runs in three shifts, - morning, day and evening. Students come from a variety of local towns and villages.

Basirhat College offers bachelor's degrees in arts, Science and Commerce. It has also built a computer lab and by introducing automation software.

== Departments at Basirhat College ==
Departments at Basirhat College include Bengali, Arabic, History, Political Science, Physics, Mathematics, Economics, Botany, Zoology, Commerce, English, Philosophy, Chemistry, Geography, Physiology, Education, and Sanskrit.

== Accreditation ==
Basirhat College is recognized by the University Grants Commission (UGC) and the institution is awarded 'A' grade by NAAC.

== Scholarship ==
Swami Vivekananda Merit-cum-Means Scholarship (SVMCM) is a West Bengal government scheme offering financial aid for students from economically weaker sections for higher education.

== See also ==
- Education in India
- List of colleges in West Bengal
- Education in West Bengal
