= Basirhat subdivision =

- Subdivision
- Interactive map of Basirhat subdivision
- Coordinates: 22.66°N 88.89°E
- Country: India
- State: West Bengal
- District: North 24 Parganas
- Headquarters: Basirhat

Government
  - Type: Subdivision
  - Body: Basirhat Subdivisional Office
  - SDO: Jasleen Kaur, IAS

Area
  - Total: 1,777.02 km^{2} (686.11 sq mi)

Population (2011)
  - Total: 2,271,810
  - Density: 1,278.44/km^{2} (3,311.14/sq mi)

Languages
  - Official: Bengali, English
  - Native: Bengali
- Time zone: UTC+5:30 (IST)
- ISO 3166 code: ISO 3166-2:IN

Basirhat subdivision is an administrative subdivision of the North 24 Parganas district in the Indian state of West Bengal.

== History ==
In 1757, the East India Company obtained the zamindari or land-holders rights of the 24 Parganas Zamindari from Mir Jafar, the new Nawab of Bengal. Full proprietary status was handed over to Robert Clive in 1759 by a sanad or deed granting him the 24 Parganas as a jagir. After Clive's death in 1774, full proprietary rights of the 24 Parganas zamindari reverted to the East India Company. In 1814, the district consisted of two parts – the suburbs of Kolkata (referred to as Dihi Panchannagram) and the rest. In 1834, several parganas of Jessore and Nadia were added to the 24 Parganas. The district was divided into two divisions. The Alipore division comprised territories originally ceded to the company and the Barasat division comprised territories added from Jessore and Nadia. The two divisions were replaced by eight subdivisions in 1861 – Diamond Harbour, Baruipur, Alipore, Dum Dum, Barrackpore, Barasat, Basirhat and Satkhira. The Satkhira subdivision was transferred to the newly formed Khulna district in 1882, the Baruipur subdivision was abolished in 1883 and the Dum Dum and Barrackpore subdivisions in 1893. Barrackpore subdivision was reconstituted in 1904 with portions of Barasat and Alipore subdivisions.

== Geography ==
Basirhat subdivision is part of the Ichhamati-Raimangal Plain, one of the three physiographic regions in the district located in the lower Ganges Delta. It contains soil of mature black or brownish loam to recent alluvium. The Ichhamati flows through the eastern part of the district.

== Subdivisions ==

North 24 Parganas district is divided into the following administrative subdivisions:

Subdivision	Headquarters	Area km^{2}	Population (2011)	Urban population % (2011)	Rural Population % (2011)
Bangaon	Bangaon	838.17	1,063,028	16.33	83.67
Barasat Sadar	Barasat	1,002.48	2,789,611	54.67	45.33
Barrackpore	Barrackpore	334.51	3,668,653	96.02	3.98
Bidhannagar	Bidhannagar	33.50	216,609	100.00	0
Basirhat	Basirhat	1,777.02	2,271,880	12.96	87.04
North 24 Parganas district	Barasat	4,094.00	10,009,781	57.27	42.73

Cities, towns and locations in Basirhat subdivision, North 24 Parganas district
M: municipal town, CT: census town, R: rural/ urban centre
Owing to space constraints in the small map, the actual locations in a larger map may vary slightly

== Religion ==
Given below is an overview of the religion-wise break-up of the population across the subdivisions of North 24 Parganas district, as per 2011 census:

Subdivision	Population (2011)	Hindu %	Muslim %	Christian %	Others %
Bangaon	1,063,028	85.63	13.73	0.26	0.38
Barasat Sadar	2,789,611	65.18	34.26	0.16	0.40
Barrackpore	3,668,653	88.61	10.32	0.35	0.71
Bidhannagar	216,609	95.26	2.56	0.45	1.73
Basirhat	2,271,810	51.37	48.37	0.14	0.13
North 24 Parganas district	10,009,781	73.45	25.82	0.24	0.48

North 24 Parganas district with 24.22% Muslims (in 2001) has been identified as a minority concentrated district by the Ministry of Minority Affairs, Government of India. A baseline survey on religious minority population has been carried out under the aegis of Indian Council of Social Science Research and funded by the Ministry of Minority Affairs. For information on the survey see North 24 Parganas: minority concentrated district.

== Population movement ==
North 24 Parganas district is densely populated, mainly because of the influx of refugees from East Pakistan (later Bangladesh). With a density of population of 2,182 per km^{2} in 1971, it was 3rd in terms of density per km^{2} in West Bengal after Kolkata and Howrah, and 20th in India. According to the District Human Development Report: North 24 Parganas, "High density is also explained partly by the rapid growth of urbanization in the district. In 1991, the percentage of urban population in the district has been 51.23."

As per the Refugee Relief and Rehabilitation Department of the Government of West Bengal, the census figures show the number of refugees from East Pakistan in 1971 was nearly 6 million and in 1981, the number was assessed at 8 million. A district-wise break-up in 1971, shows the main thrust of the refugee influx was on 24-Parganas (22.3% of the total refugees), Nadia (20.3%), Bankura (19.1%) and Kolkata (12.9%).

The North 24 Paraganas district has a 352 km long international border with Bangladesh, out of which 160 km is land border and 192 km is riverine border. Only a small portion of the border has been fenced and it is popularly referred to as a porous border. There are reports of Bangladeshi infiltrators. The CD Block pages carry Decadal Population Growth information.

An estimate made in 2000 places the total number of illegal Bangladeshi immigrants in India at 15 million, with around 0.3 million entering every year. The thumb rule for such illegal immigrants is that for each illegal person caught four get through. While many immigrants have settled in the border areas, some have moved on, even to far way places such as Mumbai and Delhi. The border is guarded by the Border Security Force. During the UPA government, Sriprakash Jaiswal, Union Minister of State for Home Affairs, had made a statement in Parliament on 14 July 2004, that there were 12 million illegal Bangladeshi infiltrators living in India, and West Bengal topped the list with 5.7 million Bangladeshis. More recently, Kiren Rijiju, Minister of State for Home Affairs in the NDA government has put the figure at around 20 million.

== Administrative units ==
Basirhat subdivision has 11 police stations, 10 community development blocks, 10 panchayat samitis, 90 gram panchayats, 631 mouzas, 617 inhabited villages, 3 municipalities and 13 census towns. The municipalities are at Baduria, Taki and Basirhat. The census towns are: Itinda, Dandirhat, Uttar Bagundi, Dhanyakuria, Mathurapur, Raghunathpur, Dakshin Chatra, Deora, Sadigachhi, Hingalganj, Bankra, Minakhan, and Balihati. The subdivision has its headquarters at Basirhat.

== Police stations ==
Police stations in Basirhat subdivision have the following features and jurisdiction:

Police station	Area covered (km^{2})	Border (km)	Municipal town/ city	CD Block
Baduria	218	2.5	Baduria	Baduria
Haroa	n/a	-	-	Haroa
Minakhan	113.06	-	-	Minakhan
Swarupnagar	217.17	42	-	Swarupnagar
Hasnabad	295	28	Taki	Hasnabad
Hingalganj	n/a	n/a	-	Hingalganj Partly
Hemnagar	n/a	15 (riverine)	-	Hingalganj Partly
Sandeshkhali	n/a	-	-	Sandeshkhali II
Nazat	n/a	-	-	Sandeshkhali I
Basirhat	267	22	Basirhat	Basirhat I
Matia	n/a	n/a	-	Basirhat II

== Blocks ==

Community development blocks in Basirhat subdivision are:

CD Block	Headquarters	Area km^{2}	Population (2011)	SC %	ST %	Hindus %	Muslims %	Literacy rate %	Census Towns
Baduria	Iswarigachha	179.72	285,319	16.41	0.85	34.35	65.48	78.75	1
Haroa	Haroa	152.73	214,401	23.62	5.94	38.76	61.12	73.13	-
Swarupnagar	Swarupnagar	215.13	256,075	31.06	0.25	52.17	47.58	77.57	1
Minakhan	Minakhan	158.82	199,084	30.43	9.32	47.77	51.60	71.33	2
Hasnabad	Hasnabad	153.07	203,262	25.24	3.69	43.35	56.51	71.47	1
Hingalganj	Hingalganj	238.80	174,545	66.02	7.30	87.97	11.82	76.85	2
Sandeshkhali I	Nazat	182.30	164,465	30.90	25.95	69.19	30.42	71.08	-
Sandeshkhali II	Dwarir Jangle	197.21	160,976	44.91	23.42	77.17	22.27	70.96	-
Basirhat I	Basirhat	111.84	171,613	12.86	0.74	31.24	68.54	72.10	3
Basirhat II	Mathurapur	127.42	226,130	8.75	2.51	29.67	70.10	78.30	3

== Gram panchayats ==
The subdivision contains 90 gram panchayats under 10 community development blocks:

- Gram panchayats in Baduria CD Block are: Aturia, Chatra, Jadurhati Uttar, Sayestanagar–II, Bagjola, Jagannathpur, Raghunathpur, Jadurhati Dakshin, Bajitpur, Jasikati Atghara, Ramchandrapur Uday, Chandipur, Nayabastia Milani and Sayestanagar–I.
- Gram panchayats in Basirhat I CD Block are: Gachha Akharpur, Itinda Panitore, Pifa, Sankchura Bagundi, Gotra, Nimdari Kodalia and Sangrampur Shibati.
- Gram panchayats in Basirhat II CD block are: Begumpur Bibipur, Dhanyakuria, Kholapota, Ghorarash Kulingram, Rajendrapur, Chaita, Shrinagar Metia, Champapukur and Kachua.
- Gram panchayats in Haroa CD Block are: Bakjuri, Haroa, Shalipur, Gopalpur–I, Khasbalanda, Sonapukur Sankarpur, Gopalpur–II and Kulti.
- Gram panchayats in Hasnabad CD Block are: Amlani, Bhabanipur–I, Hasnabad, Patlikhanpur, Barunhat Rameswarpur, Bhabanipur–II, Makhalgachha, Bhebia and Murarisha.
- Gram panchayats in Hingalganj CD Block are: Bishpur, Hingalganj, Rupamari, Dulduli, Jogeshganj, Sahebkhali, Gobindakati, Kalitala and Sandelerbil.
- Gram panchayats in Minakhan CD block are: Atpukur, Chaital, Dhuturdaha, Minakhan, Bamanpukur, Champali, Kumarjole and Mohanpur.
- Gram panchayats in Sandeshkhali I CD Block are: Bayermari–I, Kalinagar, Sarberia Agarhati, Bayermari–II, Nazat–I, Sehera Radhanagar, Hatgachhi and Nazat–II.
- Gram panchayats in Sandeshkhali II CD Block are: Bermajur–I, Durgamandop, Khulna, Manipur, Bermajur–II, Jeliakhali, Korakati and Sandeshkhali.
- Gram panchayats in Swarupnagar CD Block are: Balti Nityanandakati, Bithari Hakimpur, Kaijuri, Swarupnagar Banglani, Charghat, Saguna, Bankra Gokulpur, Gobindapur, Sharapul Nirman and Tepur Mirzapur.

== Municipal towns/ cities ==
An overview of the municipal towns and cities in Basirhat subdivision is given below.

Municipal town/city	Area (km^{2})	Population (2011)	Hindu %	Muslim %	Slum population %	BPL Households % (2006)	Literacy% (2001)
Baduria	22.43	52,493	51.70	48.16	-	59.81	76.14
Taki	15.54	38,263	84.78	15.00	-	37.35	75.44
Basirhat	22.01	125,254	77.60	22.21	-	35.92	81.85

== Education ==
North 24 Parganas district had a literacy rate of 84.06% (for population of 7 years and above) as per the census of India 2011. Bangaon subdivision had a literacy rate of 80.57%, Barasat Sadar subdivision 84.90%, Barrackpur subdivision 89.09%, Bidhannagar subdivision 89.16% and Basirhat subdivision 75.67%.

Given in the table below (data in numbers) is a comprehensive picture of the education scenario in North 24 Parganas district for the year 2012-13:

Subdivision	Primary School		Middle School		High School		Higher Secondary School		General College, Univ		Technical / Professional Instt		Non-formal Education	
Subdivision	Institution	Student	Institution	Student	Institution	Student	Institution	Student	Institution	Student	Institution	Student	Institution	Student
Bangaon	533	54,361	1	36	31	14,654	83	107,745	4	11,031	1	95	1,594	54,016
Barasat Sadar	920	120,670	19	2,734	93	63,707	171	246,098	14	40,466	23	6,190	2,887	130,522
Barrackpore	948	126,453	29	5,716	193	165,924	205	215,713	25	44,818	20	6,345	2,483	160,236
Bidhannagar	20	12,317	-	-	1	900	17	22,536	1	865	15	5,432	1	552
Basirhat	1,256	139,737	25	10,165	124	101,536	118	105,724	6	15,248	-	-	3,800	164,833
North 24 Parganas district	3,677	453,538	74	18,651	442	346,721	594	697,816	49	112,428	59	18,062	10,765	439,560

Note: Primary schools include junior basic schools; middle schools, high schools and higher secondary schools include madrasahs; technical schools include junior technical schools, junior government polytechnics, industrial technical institutes, industrial training centres, nursing training institutes etc.; technical and professional colleges include engineering colleges, medical colleges, para-medical institutes, management colleges, teachers training and nursing training colleges, law colleges, art colleges, music colleges etc. Special and non-formal education centres include sishu siksha kendras, madhyamik siksha kendras, centres of Rabindra mukta vidyalaya, recognised Sanskrit tols, institutions for the blind and other handicapped persons, Anganwadi centres, reformatory schools etc.

The following institutions are located in Basirhat subdivision:

- Basirhat College was established at Basirhat in 1947.
- Kalinagar Mahavidyalaya was established at Kalinagar, in 1985.
- Hingalganj Mahavidyalaya was established at Hingalganj in 2005.
- Saheed Nurul Islam Mahavidyalaya was established at Tentulia in 2001.
- Taki Government College was established at Taki in 1950.
- Bamanpukur Humayun Kabir Mahavidyalaya was established at Bamanpukur in 1973,

== Healthcare ==
The table below (all data in numbers) presents an overview of the medical facilities available and patients treated in the hospitals, health centres and sub-centres in 2013 in North 24 Parganas district.

Subdivision	Health & Family Welfare Deptt, WB				Other State Govt Deptts**	Local bodies**	Central Govt Deptts / PSUs**	NGO / Private Nursing Homes**	Total	Total Number of Beds	Total Number of Doctors*	Indoor Patients	Outdoor Patients
Subdivision	Hospitals	Rural Hospitals	Block Primary Health Centres	Primary Health Centres	Other State Govt Deptts**	Local bodies**	Central Govt Deptts / PSUs**	NGO / Private Nursing Homes**	Total	Total Number of Beds	Total Number of Doctors*	Indoor Patients	Outdoor Patients
Bangaon	1	1	2	10	-	-	-	-	14	417	24	11,587	650,349
Barasat Sadar	3	1	6	15	-	-	-	-	25	1,084	45	125,000	1,397,574
Barrackpore	7	-	2	2	-	-	-	-	11	1,081	8	94,042	1,010,820
Bidhannagar	1	-	-	-	-	-	-	`	1	100	-	6,567	117,136
Basirhat	1	5	5	23	-	-	-	-	34	703	77	69,034	897,725
North 24 Parganas district	13	7	15	50	6	27	3	233	354	3,385	154	306,230	4,073,604

.* Excluding nursing homes.
** Subdivision-wise break up for certain items not available.

Medical facilities available in Basirhat subdivision are as follows:

Hospitals: (Name, location, beds)
Basirhat Subdivisional Hospital, Basirhat, 300 beds
Hasnabad Matri Sadan, Hasnabad, 6 beds

Rural Hospitals: (Name, block, location, beds)
Rudrapur (Baduria) Rural Hospital, Rudrapur, 60 beds
Minakhan Rural Hospital, Minakhan, 25 beds
Sarapole (Sonarpur) Rural Hospital, Sarapole, 30 beds
Taki Rural Hospital, Taki, 50 beds
Ghoshpur Rural Hospital, Ghoshpur, 30 beds
Sandeshkhali Rural Hospital, Sandeshkhali, 26 beds
Haroa (Adampur) Rural Hospital, Haroa, 30 beds
Sandelerbil Rural Hospital, Sandelerbil, 30 beds
Dhanyakuria Rural Hospital, Dhanyakuria, 30 beds

Block Primary Health Centres: (Name, block, location, beds)
Shibhati BPHC, Shibhati, 15 beds

Primary Health Centres: (CD Block-wise)(CD Block, PHC location, beds)
Baduria CD Block: Dakshin Chatra PHC (6), Jadurhati PHC (6), Masia PHC (6), Bajitpur PHC, Model Belghoria (10), Haroa CD Block: Gopalpur PHC (10), Kamarghanti PHC, Sonapukur (6)
Minakhan CD Block: Nimichi PHC (6), Duturdaha (10)
Swarupnagar CD Block: Bankra PHC (10), Charghat PHC (10)
Hasnabad CD Block: Bhawanipur PHC, Bhurkundu (10), Ghola PHC, Bhebia (6), Barunhat PHC, Bara Bankra (10)
Hingalganj CD Block: Hingalganj PHC (6), Jogeshganj PHC (10)
Sandeshkhali I CD Block: Hatgachia PHC, Agarbati (10), Nazat PHC (6)
Sandeshkhali II CD Block: Korakanthi PHC (10), Jeliakhali PHC (6)
Basirhat I CD Block: Nakuda PHC (10)
Basirhat II CD Block: Sikra Kulingram PHC (6), Rajendrapur PHC (10)

== Electoral constituencies ==
Lok Sabha (parliamentary) and Vidhan Sabha (state assembly) constituencies in Basirhat subdivision were as follows:

Lok Sabha constituency	Reservation	Vidhan Sabha constituency	Reservation	CD Block and/or Gram panchayats and/or municipal areas
Bangaon	Reserved for SC	Swarupnagar	Reserved for SC	Swarupnagar CD Block, and Ramchandrapur Uday and Sayesta Nagar I GPs of Baduria CD Block
		Other assembly segments outside Basirhat subdivision		
Basirhat	None	Baduria	None	Baduria municipality, and Aturia, Bagjola, Bajitpur, Chandipur, Chhatra, South Jadurhati, North Jadurhati, Jagannathpur, Jasikati Atghara, Nayabastia Milani, Raghunathpur and Sayesta Nagar II GPs of Baduria CD Block
		Haroa	None	Falti Beleghata, Dadpur, Kiritipur I, Kiritipur II, Shashan GPs of Barasat II CD Block, Champatala, Deganga I, Deganga II, Hadipur Jhikra II GPs of Deganga CD Block and Gopalpur I, Gopalpur II, Haroa and Khasbalanda GPs of Haroa CD Block
		Minakhan	Reserved for SC	Minakhan CD Block and Bakjuri, Kulti, Shalipur and Sonapukur Sankarpur GPs of Haroa CD Block
		Sandeshkhali	Reserved for ST	Sandeshkhali I CD Block and Beramajur I, Beramajur II, Durgamandap, Jeliakhali, Korakati, Manipur and Sandeshkhali GPs of Sandeshkhali II CD Block
		Basirhat Dakshin	None	Basirhat municipality, Basirhat I CD Block and Taki municipality
		Basirhat Uttar	None	Basirhat II CD Block, and Amlani, Bhebia, Makhal Gachha, Murarisha GPs of Hasnabad CD Block
		Hingalganj	Reserved for SC	Hingalganj CD Block, and Barunhat Rameshwarpur, Bhabanipur I, Bhabanipur II, Hasnabad, Patli Khanpur GPs of Hasnabad CD Block, and Khulna GP of Sandeshkhali II CD Block

== See also ==
- Basirhat district - proposed
