= Basirhat Uttar Assembly constituency =

Basirhat Uttar
- Constituency No. 125 for the West Bengal Legislative Assembly
- Interactive Map Outlining Basirhat Uttar Assembly Constituency

Constituency details
- Country: India
- Region: East India
- State: West Bengal
- District: North 24 Parganas
- Lok Sabha constituency: Basirhat
- Established: 1951
- Total electors: 2,38,426
- Reservation: None

Member of Legislative Assembly
- 18th West Bengal Legislative Assembly
- Incumbent Mohammad Tauseefur Rahman
- Party: DTC
- Elected year: 2026

Basirhat Uttar Assembly constituency is an assembly constituency in North 24 Parganas district in the Indian state of West Bengal.

== Overview ==
As per orders of the Delimitation Commission, 125 Basirhat Uttar Assembly constituency is composed of the following: Basirhat II community development block, and Amlani, Bhebia, Makhal Gachha, Murarisha gram panchayats of Hasnabad community development block.

Basirhat Uttar Assembly constituency is part of 18. Basirhat Lok Sabha constituency.

== Members of the Legislative Assembly ==
Election	Member	Party Affiliation
Basirhat
1951	Profulla Nath Banerjee	Indian National Congress
1957	Profulla Nath Banerjee	Indian National Congress
1962	Bijesh Chandra Sen	Indian National Congress
1967	A.B. Bandopadhyay	Communist Party of India
1969	A.B. Bandopadhyay	Communist Party of India
1971	Lalit Kumar Ghosh	Indian National Congress
1972	Lalit Kumar Ghosh	Indian National Congress
1977	Narayan Mukherjee	Communist Party of India (Marxist)
1982	Narayan Mukherjee	Communist Party of India (Marxist)
1987	Narayan Mukherjee	Communist Party of India (Marxist)
1991	Narayan Mukherjee	Communist Party of India (Marxist)
1996	Narayan Mukherjee	Communist Party of India (Marxist)
2001	Narayan Mukherjee	Communist Party of India (Marxist)
2006	Narayan Mukherjee	Communist Party of India (Marxist)
Basirhat Uttar
2011	Mostafa Bin Qaseem	Communist Party of India (Marxist)
2011^	ATM Abdullah	Trinamool Congress
2016	Rafikul Islam Mondal	Communist Party of India (Marxist)
2021	Rafikul Islam Mondal	Trinamool Congress
2026	Md. Tauseef Rahman	Trinamool Congress

- ^ denotes by-election

== Election results ==
=== 2026 ===
2026 West Bengal Legislative Assembly election: Basirhat Uttar
Party	Candidate	Votes	%	±%
AITC	Md. Tauseef Rahman	115,503	48.42	−9.13
Indian Secular Front	Md. Musa Karemulla	58,233	24.41	+4.33
BJP	Koushik Sidhartha	55,211	23.14	+3.22
Independent	Sahanur Mondal	2,532	1.06	
NOTA	None of the above	1,684	0.71	−0.11
Majority		57,270	24.01	−13.46
Turnout		238,563	97.12	+8.17
AITC hold		Swing	-9.13	

=== 2021 ===
2021 West Bengal Legislative Assembly election: Basirhat Uttar
Party	Candidate	Votes	%	±%
AITC	Rafikul Islam Mondal	137,216	57.55	
Indian Secular Front	Md Baijid Amin	47,865	20.08	
BJP	Narayan Chandra Mondal	47,505	19.92	
NOTA	None of the above	1,952	0.82	
Majority		89,351	37.47	
Turnout		238,426	88.95	
AITC gain from CPI(M)		Swing		

=== 2016 ===
2016 West Bengal Legislative Assembly election: Basirhat Uttar constituency
Party	Candidate	Votes	%	±%
CPI(M)	Rafikul Islam Mondal	97,828	45.74	▲8.85
AITC	ATM Abdullah	97,336	45,51	▼11.44
BJP	Tarafan Ali Gazi	13,072	6.11	▲1.62
BSP	Abul Kasem Dhali	3,006	1.41	
NOTA	None of the above	2,636	1.24	N/A
Majority		492	0.23	▼19.83
Turnout		2,13,885	89.62	
CPI(M) gain from AITC		Swing		

The percentage changes of the 2016 election is calculated based upon the 2011 Bypoll.

=== 2011 bypoll ===
A by-election in 2011 was necessitated by the death of Mostafa bin Kassem, the CPI(M) MLA from Basirhat Uttar, who was found dead outside Kyd street MLA's Hostel on 29 May 2011.

West Bengal state assembly bye election, 2011: Basirhat Uttar constituency
Party	Candidate	Votes	%	±%
AITC	ATM Abdullah	87,899	56.95	▲14.12
CPI(M)	Subid Ali Gazi	56,948	36.89	▼8.30
BJP	Subodh Kumar Chakraborty	6,938	4.49	▼1.08
Independent	Ajit Pramanick	2,964		
Turnout		154,339	80.35	▼6.49
AITC gain from CPI(M)		Swing		

The percentage changes of the bypoll is calculated from the 2011 assembly election.

=== 2011 ===
West Bengal assembly elections, 2011: Basirhat Uttar constituency
Party	Candidate	Votes	%	±%
CPI(M)	Mostafa Bin Qaseem	75,576	45.19	
AITC	Sardar Amzad Ali	71,632	42.83	
BJP	Somen Mandal	9,316	5.57	
People’s Democratic Conference of India	Rafikul Mandal	7,327		
BSP	Prosanta Biswas	1,829		
All india Minorities Front	Anwar Hossain Mollah	1,569		
Turnout		167,248	86.84	
CPI(M) win (new seat)				

As per 2011 census the total population of basirhat uttar is 338937, Hindu 115986, Muslim 222264, Other 687.Hindu 34.22%, Muslim 65.58%, Other 0.20%.

=== 2006 ===
During the period Narayan Mukherjee of CPI(M) won seven elections in a row from 95 Basirhat assembly constituency, defeating his nearest rivals Asit Majumdar of INC in 2006, Souren Sen of Trinamool Congress in 2001, Asit Majumdar of Congress in 1996, Dilip Mazumdar of Congress in 1991 and 1987, and Debi Prasad Nanda of Congress in 1982 and 1977.

=== 1972 ===
Contests in most years were multi cornered but only winners and runners are being mentioned. Lalit Kumar Ghosh of Congress won in 1972 and 1971. A.B.Bandopadhyay of CPI won in 1969 and 1967. Bijesh Chandra Sen of Congress won in 1962. Profulla Nath Banerjee of Congress won in 1957 and in independent India's first election in 1951.
