= Sandeshkhali (disambiguation) =

Sandeshkhali is a village in India. It may also refer to:

- Sandeshkhali I, a community development block in Basirhat subdivision of North 24 Parganas district in the Indian state of West Bengal
- Sandeshkhali II, a community development block in Basirhat subdivision of North 24 Parganas district in the Indian state of West Bengal
- Sandeshkhali (Vidhan Sabha constituency), an assembly constituency in North 24 Parganas district in the Indian state of West Bengal

== See also ==
- Sandesh (disambiguation)
- Khali (disambiguation)
