= Kalinagar, North 24 Parganas =

Kalinagar
- Village
- Location in West Bengal, India Kalinagar (India)
- Coordinates: 22.421867°N 88.869456°E
- Country: India
- State: West Bengal
- District: North 24 Parganas

Population (2011)
  - Total: 8,679

Languages
  - Official: Bengali, English
- Time zone: UTC+5:30 (IST)
- PIN: 743442
- Telephone/STD code: 03217
- Lok Sabha constituency: Basirhat
- Vidhan Sabha constituency: Sandeshkhali
- Website: north24parganas.nic.in

Kalinagar is a village and a gram panchayat in the Sandeshkhali I CD block in the Basirhat subdivision of the North 24 Parganas district in the state of West Bengal, India.

== Geography ==
Cities, towns and locations in Basirhat subdivision, North 24 Parganas district
M: municipal town, CT: census town, R: rural/ urban centre
Owing to space constraints in the small map, the actual locations in a larger map may vary slightly

=== Location ===
Kalinagar is located at 22.421867°N 88.869456°E.pin.cod.743442

=== Area overview ===
The area shown in the map is a part of the Ichhamati-Raimangal Plain, located in the lower Ganges Delta. It contains soil of mature black or brownish loam to recent alluvium. Numerous rivers, creeks and khals criss-cross the area. The tip of the Sundarbans National Park is visible in the lower part of the map (shown in green but not marked). The larger full screen map shows the full forest area. A large section of the area is a part of the Sundarbans settlements. The densely populated area is an overwhelmingly rural area. Only 12.96% of the population lives in the urban areas and 87.04% of the population lives in the rural areas.

Note: The map alongside presents some of the notable locations in the subdivision. All places marked in the map are linked in the larger full screen map.

== Demographics ==
According to the 2011 Census of India, Kalinagar had a total population of 8,679, of which 4,393 (51%) were males and 4,286 (49%) were females. Population in the age range 0–6 years was 1,022. The total number of literate persons in Kalinagar was 5,629 (73.51% of the population over 6 years).

== Transport ==
Sandeshkhali I CD block is served by Nazat PS. The CD block headquarters are also located at Nazat, which is across the Betni River. One can reach Nazat by ferry from Ghoshpur ferry ghat to Nazat bazar ferryghat at Nazat.

== Education ==
Kalinagar Mahavidyalaya was established at Kalinagar in 1985. Affiliated with the West Bengal State University, it offers honours courses in Bengali, English, Sanskrit, education, history and geography, and a BA general course. It has hostel facilities.

== Healthcare ==
Ghoshpur Rural Hospital at Ghoshpur is located nearby.
