= Rekha Patra =

Indian politician

Member of the West Bengal Legislative Assembly
- Incumbent
- Assumed office 4 May 2026
- Preceded by: Debes Mondal
- Constituency: Hingalganj

Personal details
- Born: Sandeshkhali, North 24 Parganas, West Bengal, India
- Party: Bharatiya Janata Party
- Spouse: Sandip Patra
- Children: 1
- Education: Uttar Bowthakurani F.P. School (4th Pass)
- Occupation: Politician, Social Activist
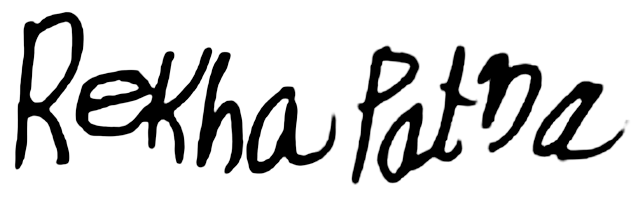
- Signature

Rekha Patra (born c. 1993) is an Indian politician and social activist serving as a Member of the Legislative Assembly (MLA) in the West Bengal Legislative Assembly. A member of the Bharatiya Janata Party (BJP), she was elected from the Hingalganj (SC) constituency in the 2026 West Bengal Legislative Assembly election. She rose to national prominence in early 2024 as one of the leading voices of the Sandeshkhali protests, advocating against alleged systemic harassment and land-grabbing in the North 24 Parganas district.

== Sandeshkhali violence ==
In early 2024, Patra emerged as a prominent figure during the grassroots movement in Sandeshkhali, North 24 Parganas. She was among the first women to publicly allege sexual harassment, physical violence, and land-grabbing by local Trinamool Congress leader Sheikh Shahjahan and his associates

== Political career ==
=== 2024 Lok Sabha Election ===
Following her rise as a symbolic face of resistance, the BJP nominated Patra as its candidate for the Basirhat Lok Sabha constituency in the 2024 Indian general election. Despite a high-profile campaign, she lost to the Trinamool Congress candidate, Haji Nurul Islam, by a margin of over 3.33 lakh votes.

=== 2026 West Bengal Assembly Election ===
In the 2026 West Bengal Legislative Assembly election, the BJP fielded Patra from the Hingalganj constituency, a seat reserved for Scheduled Castes (SC).

On May 4, 2026, Patra secured a historic victory, defeating the TMC candidate by a margin of 5,421 votes. Her win was part of a broader political shift in the 2026 elections, where several grassroots activists and victims of high-profile incidents were elected to the state assembly.

Year	Election	Constituency	Party	Votes	Margin	Result
2024	Lok Sabha	Basirhat	BJP	4,70,215	−3,33,547	Lost
2026	West Bengal Assembly	Hingalganj (SC)	BJP	1,00,207	+5,421	Won

== Personal life ==
Rekha Patra continues to reside in Sandeshkhali. According to her 2024 election affidavit, she lived in a modest house and declared assets worth approximately ₹25,000. She has two daughter and a son.

== See also ==
- 2026 West Bengal Legislative Assembly election
- Sandeshkhali violence
- Ratna Debnath
