= Hatgachha, North 24 Parganas =

Hatgachha
- Village
- Location in West Bengal, India Hatgachha (India)
- Coordinates: 22.36°N 88.94°E
- Country: India
- State: West Bengal
- District: North 24 Parganas

Population (2011)
  - Total: 5,980

Languages
  - Official: Bengali, English
- Time zone: UTC+5:30 (IST)
- PIN: 743446
- Telephone/STD code: 03217
- Lok Sabha constituency: Basirhat
- Vidhan Sabha constituency: Hingalganj
- Website: north24parganas.gov.in

Hatgachha is a village in Sandeshkhali II CD block in Basirhat subdivision of North 24 Parganas district in the Indian state of West Bengal.

== Geography ==
Hatgachha, North 24 Parganas is located at 22°21′40″N 88°56′38″E

== Demographics ==
As per the 2011 Census of India, Hatgachha had a total population of 5,980, of which 3,080 (52%) were males and 2,880 (48%) were females. Population below 6 years was 607. The total number of literates in Hatgachha was 3,962 (74.10% of the population over 6 years).

== Transport ==
Lebukhali, around 14 km south of Hingalganj, was, in 2014, the last point up to which bus services were available. For travelling towards the Sundarbans one has to use ferry services (not available every day) or boats. From Hatgachha one can travel by road to Bhanderkhali nearby and then get a ferry service from Bhanderkhali ferry ghat to Lebukhali ferry ghat,

== Education ==
Hatgacha KC Amritamayee High School is a co-educational higher secondary school.
