= Hemnagar, North 24 Parganas =

Hemnagar
- Village
- Location in West Bengal, India Hemnagar (India)
- Coordinates: 22.216322°N 88.981633°E
- Country: India
- State: West Bengal
- District: North 24 Parganas

Population (2011)
  - Total: 3,960

Languages
  - Official: Bengali, English
- Time zone: UTC+5:30 (IST)
- PIN: 743439 (Hemnagar)
- Telephone/STD code: 03217
- Lok Sabha constituency: Basirhat
- Vidhan Sabha constituency: Hingalganj
- Website: north24parganas.nic.in

Hemnagar is a village in the Hingalganj CD block in the Basirhat subdivision of the North 24 Parganas district in the state of West Bengal, India.

== Geography ==
Cities, towns and locations in Basirhat subdivision, North 24 Parganas district
M: municipal town, CT: census town, R: rural/ urban centre
Owing to space constraints in the small map, the actual locations in a larger map may vary slightly

=== Location ===
Hemnagar is located at 22.216322°N 88.981633°E.

=== Area overview ===
The area shown in the map is a part of the Ichhamati-Raimangal Plain, located in the lower Ganges Delta. It contains soil of mature black or brownish loam to recent alluvium. Numerous rivers, creeks and khals criss-cross the area. The tip of the Sundarbans National Park is visible in the lower part of the map (shown in green but not marked). The larger full screen map shows the full forest area. A large section of the area is a part of the Sundarbans settlements. The densely populated area is an overwhelmingly rural area. Only 12.96% of the population lives in the urban areas and 87.04% of the population lives in the rural areas.

Note: The map alongside presents some of the notable locations in the subdivision. All places marked in the map are linked in the larger full screen map.

== Civic Administration ==
=== Police station ===
Hemnagar police station has jurisdiction over Hingalganj CD Block (partly). It has a riverine border of 15 km, all of which is unfenced.

Hemnagar PS was a part of the comprehensive coastal surveillance plan covering the coastal areas along the Bay of Bengal and the Sundarbans bordering Bangladesh.

See also - Chhota Mollakhali for a similar police station in South 24 Parganas district

== Demographics ==
According to the 2011 Census of India, Hemnagar had a total population of 3,960, of which 2,029 (51%) were males and 1,931 (49%) were females. Population in the age range 0–6 years was 367. The total number of literate persons in Hemnagar was 2,844 (79.15% of the population over 6 years).

== Transport ==
This is what a two-wheeler rider wrote after a visit to the area in 2014: "From Hingalganj to Lebukhali, it's a 14 km butter-smooth road. Except for a few shanties or a few village markets you are surrounded by lush green paddy or mustard (during winter) fields. Lebukhali is the last place till where bus services are available. After that you have to take another ferry to go to Hemnagar." Beyond Hemnagar, the Sundarbans start.

The 684 m long bridge across the Katakhali at Hasnabad was opened to public in March 2019, linking Hingalganj with Hasnabad. Lebukhali, the last point up to which motorised transport can reach is now directly connected to Kolkata and other places.

== Education ==
Hemnagar High School is a Bengali-medium coeducational institution, established in 1957. It has facilities for teaching from class VI to X.
