= Chhota Molla Khali =

- Village
- Location in West Bengal Location in India
- Coordinates: 22.2222°N 88.8956°E
- Country: India
- State: West Bengal
- District: South 24 Parganas
- CD block: Gosaba

Area
  - Total: 10.64 km^{2} (4.11 sq mi)
- Elevation: 6 m (20 ft)

Population (2011)
  - Total: 10,537
  - Density: 990.3/km^{2} (2,565/sq mi)

Languages
  - Official: Bengali
  - Additional official: English
- Time zone: UTC+5:30 (IST)
- PIN: 743378
- Telephone code: +91 3218
- Vehicle registration: WB-19 to WB-22, WB-95 to WB-99
- Lok Sabha constituency: Jaynagar (SC)
- Vidhan Sabha constituency: Gosaba (SC)
- Website: www.s24pgs.gov.in

Chhota Molla Khali is a village and a gram panchayat within the jurisdiction of the Gosaba police station in the Gosaba CD block in the Canning subdivision of the South 24 Parganas district in the Indian state of West Bengal.

== Geography ==
Places in Canning subdivision (Canning I & II, Basanti, Gosaba CD blocks) in South 24 Parganas district
R: rural/ urban centre
Places linked with coastal activity are marked in blue
Owing to space constraints in the small map, the actual locations in a larger map may vary slightly

=== Area overview ===
Canning subdivision has a very low level of urbanization. Only 12.37% of the population lives in the urban areas and 87.63% lives in the rural areas. There are 8 census towns in Canning I CD block and only 2 in the rest of the subdivision. The entire district is situated in the Ganges Delta with numerous islands in the southern part of the region. The area (shown in the map alongside) borders on the Sundarbans National Park and a major portion of it is a part of the Sundarbans settlements. It is a flat low-lying area in the South Bidyadhari plains. The Matla River is prominent and there are many streams and water channels locally known as khals. A comparatively recent country-wide development is the guarding of the coastal areas with a special coastal force.

Note: The map alongside presents some of the notable locations in the subdivision. All places marked in the map are linked in the larger full screen map.

=== Location ===
Chhota Molla Khali is located at 22.2222°N 88.8956°E.

== Demographics ==
According to the 2011 Census of India, Chhota Molla Khali had a total population of 10,537, of which 5,301 (50%) were males and 5,236 (50%) were females. There were 1,215 persons in the age range of 0 to 6 years. The total number of literate persons in Chhota Molla Khali was 7,232 (77.58% of the population over 6 years).

== Civic administration ==
=== Police station ===
Sundaban Coastal police station was inaugurated on 19 February 2005. It covers an area of 2,852 km^{2}. It has jurisdiction over parts of the Gosaba CD block. The coastal police stations were formed with the objective of effective policing of the remote areas of the Sundarbans. The police has regular river patrols.

See also - Hemnagar - for similar police station in North 24 Parganas district

== Education ==
Taranagar Jogendranath High School at PO Nathpara is located near Chhota Molla Khali.

== Healthcare ==
There is a primary health centre at Chhota Molla Khali, with 10 beds.
