= Khulna, North 24 Parganas =

Khulna
- Village
- Location in West Bengal, India
- Coordinates: 22.34°N 88.91°E
- Country: India
- State: West Bengal
- District: North 24 Parganas

Population (2011)
  - Total: 5,958

Languages
  - Official: Bengali, English
- Time zone: UTC+5:30 (IST)
- PIN: 743446
- Telephone/STD code: 03217
- Lok Sabha constituency: Basirhat
- Vidhan Sabha constituency: Hingalganj
- Website: north24parganas.gov.in

Khulna is a village and a gram panchayat in Sandeshkhali II CD Block in Basirhat subdivision of North 24 Parganas district in the Indian state of West Bengal.

== Geography ==
Khulna is located at 22°20′55″N 88°54′39″E

== Demographics ==
As per the 2011 Census of India, Khulna had a total population of 5,958, of which 3,070 (52%) were males and 2,888 (48%) were females. Population below 6 years was 680. The total number of literates in Khulna was 4,093 (77.55% of the population over 6 years).
