= Sandelerbil =

- Village
- Location in West Bengal, India Sandelerbil (India)
- Coordinates: 22.446803°N 88.955346°E
- Country: India
- State: West Bengal
- District: North 24 Parganas

Population (2011)
  - Total: 10,401

Languages
  - Official: Bengali, English
- Time zone: UTC+5:30 (IST)
- PIN: 743435
- Telephone/STD code: 03217
- Lok Sabha constituency: Basirhat
- Vidhan Sabha constituency: Hingalganj
- Website: north24parganas.nic.in

Sandelerbil is a village and a gram panchayat in the Hingalganj CD block in the Basirhat subdivision of the North 24 Parganas district in the state of West Bengal, India.

== Geography ==
Cities, towns and locations in Basirhat subdivision, North 24 Parganas district
M: municipal town, CT: census town, R: rural/ urban centre
Owing to space constraints in the small map, the actual locations in a larger map may vary slightly

=== Location ===
Sanselerbil is located at 22.446803°N 88.955346°E.

Villages in Sandelerbil gram panchayat are: Ambaria, Bankra, Bankra Dobar, Khoshbash, Sandelerbil and Singherkati.

=== Area overview ===
The area shown in the map is a part of the Ichhamati-Raimangal Plain, located in the lower Ganges Delta. It contains soil of mature black or brownish loam to recent alluvium. Numerous rivers, creeks and khals criss-cross the area. The tip of the Sundarbans National Park is visible in the lower part of the map (shown in green but not marked). The larger full screen map shows the full forest area. A large section of the area is a part of the Sundarbans settlements. The densely populated area is an overwhelmingly rural area. Only 12.96% of the population lives in the urban areas and 87.04% of the population lives in the rural areas.

Note: The map alongside presents some of the notable locations in the subdivision. All places marked in the map are linked in the larger full screen map.

== Demographics ==
According to the 2011 Census of India, Sandelerbil had a total population of 10,401, of which 5,206 (50%) were males and 5,195 (50%) were females. Population in the age range 0–6 years was 1,123. The total number of literate persons in Sandelerbil was 6,303 (67.93% of the population over 6 years).

== Healthcare ==
Sandelerbil Rural Hospital at Sandelerbil, with 30 beds, is the main medical facility in Hingalganj CD block. There are primary health centres at Hingalganj (with 6 beds) and Jogeshganj (with 10 beds).
