= Debes Mondal =

Indian politician

Member of the West Bengal Legislative Assembly
- In office 2016 – 4 May 2026
- Preceded by: Anandamoy Mondal
- Succeeded by: Rekha Patra
- Constituency: Hingalganj

Personal details
- Born: 1965 (age 60–61) Hingalganj, North 24 Parganas, West Bengal
- Party: All India Trinamool Congress
- Education: Graduation (University of Calcutta)

Debes Mondal (born 1965) is an Indian politician from West Bengal. He is a member of the West Bengal Legislative Assembly from Hingalganj Assembly constituency, which is reserved for Scheduled Caste community, in North 24 Parganas district. He won the 2021 West Bengal Legislative Assembly election representing the All India Trinamool Congress.

== Early life and education ==
Mandal is from Hingalganj, North 24 Parganas district, West Bengal. He is the son of Binod Bihari Mandal. He completed his graduation in 1990 at Basirhat College, which is affiliated with University of Calcutta.

== Career ==
Mandal won from Hingalganj Assembly constituency representing All India Trinamool Congress in the 2021 West Bengal Legislative Assembly election. He polled 104,706 votes and defeated his nearest rival, Nemai Das of the Bharatiya Janata Party, by a margin of 24,916 votes. He first became an MLA winning the 2016 West Bengal Legislative Assembly election defeating Anandamay Mandal by a margin of 30,304 votes.
