= Nirapada Sardar =

Indian politician

Member of West Bengal Legislative Assembly
- In office 13 May 2011 – 19 May 2016
- Preceded by: Abani Roy, CPI(M)
- Succeeded by: Sukumar Mahata, AITC
- Constituency: Sandeshkhali

Personal details
- Party: Communist Party of India (Marxist)

Nirapada Sardar is an Indian politician, union leader and member of the Communist Party of India (Marxist). He was an MLA in the West Bengal Legislative Assembly from 2011 to 2016 elected from Sandeshkhali (ST). He is presently secretary of the All India Agricultural Workers Union (AIAWU) and one of the West Bengal state secretaries of CPI(M).

He has raised issues of illegal landgrabs, attacks on women and police inaction in Sandeshkhali for several years. His accusation are that goons of the Trinamool Congress have taken control of the area and were enjoying impunity in assaulting people and expropriating land given to sharecroppers. He became a central figure during the 2024 upsurge against the local leaders of the TMC.

He was arrested by the West Bengal police after the absconding TMC leader Shibu Hazra, aide of TMC strongman Sheikh Shahjahan, had accused him of leading the mob of 111-117 villagers who had burnt down their husbandry farm in retaliation against assaults and landgrabs. Fresh wave of protests erupted over his arrest. In his support Sandeshkhali villagers kept the police station under a gherao for 17 days until his release. He was bailed out by the Calcutta High Court which reprimanding the police calling for action against involved policemen for illegal arrest, torture and harassment.
