= Sukumar Mahata =

Indian politician

Member of the West Bengal Legislative Assembly
- Incumbent
- Assumed office 2 May 2021
- Preceded by: Nirapada Sardar
- Succeeded by: Sanat Sardar
- Constituency: Sandeshkhali

Personal details
- Party: AITC
- Profession: Politician

Sukumar Mahata is an Indian politician member of All India Trinamool Congress. He is an MLA, elected from the Sandeshkhali constituency in the 2016 West Bengal Legislative Assembly election. In 2021 assembly election he was re-elected from the same constituency.
