= Gosaba =

- Village
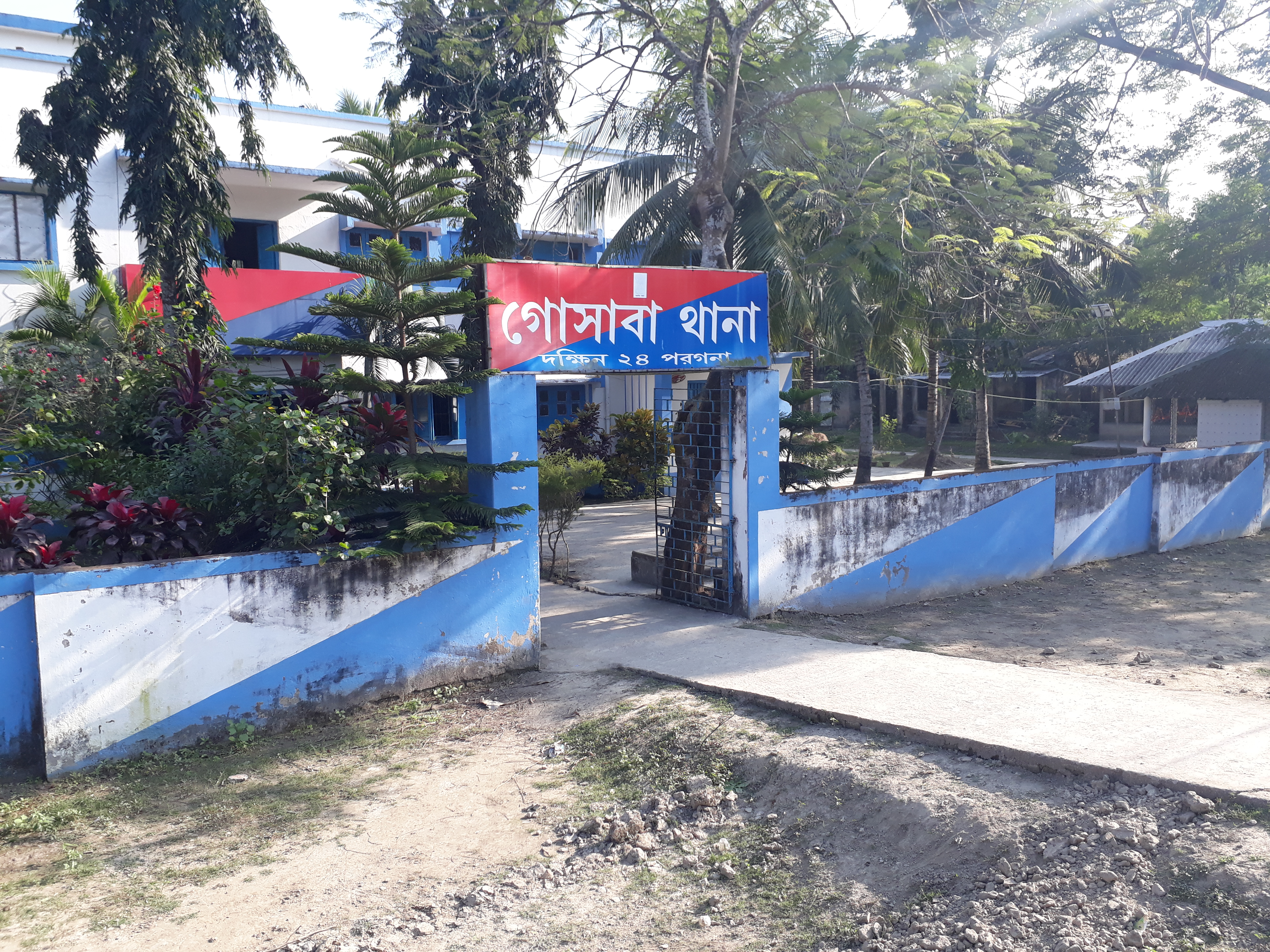
- Gosaba Police Station

- Location in West Bengal Location in India
- Coordinates: 22.1652°N 88.8079°E
- Country: India
- State: West Bengal
- District: South 24 Parganas
- CD Block: Gosaba

Area
  - Total: 3.19 km^{2} (1.23 sq mi)
- Elevation: 6 m (20 ft)

Population (2011)
  - Total: 5,369
  - Density: 1,680/km^{2} (4,360/sq mi)

Languages
  - Official: Bengali
  - Additional official: English
- Time zone: UTC+5:30 (IST)
- PIN: 743370
- Telephone code: +91 3218
- Vehicle registration: WB-19 to WB-22, WB-95 to WB-99
- Lok Sabha constituency: Jaynagar (SC)
- Vidhan Sabha constituency: Gosaba (SC)
- Website: www.s24pgs.gov.in

Gosaba is a village and a gram panchayat within the jurisdiction of the Gosaba police station in the Gosaba CD block in the Canning subdivision of the South 24 Parganas district in the Indian state of West Bengal.

== History ==
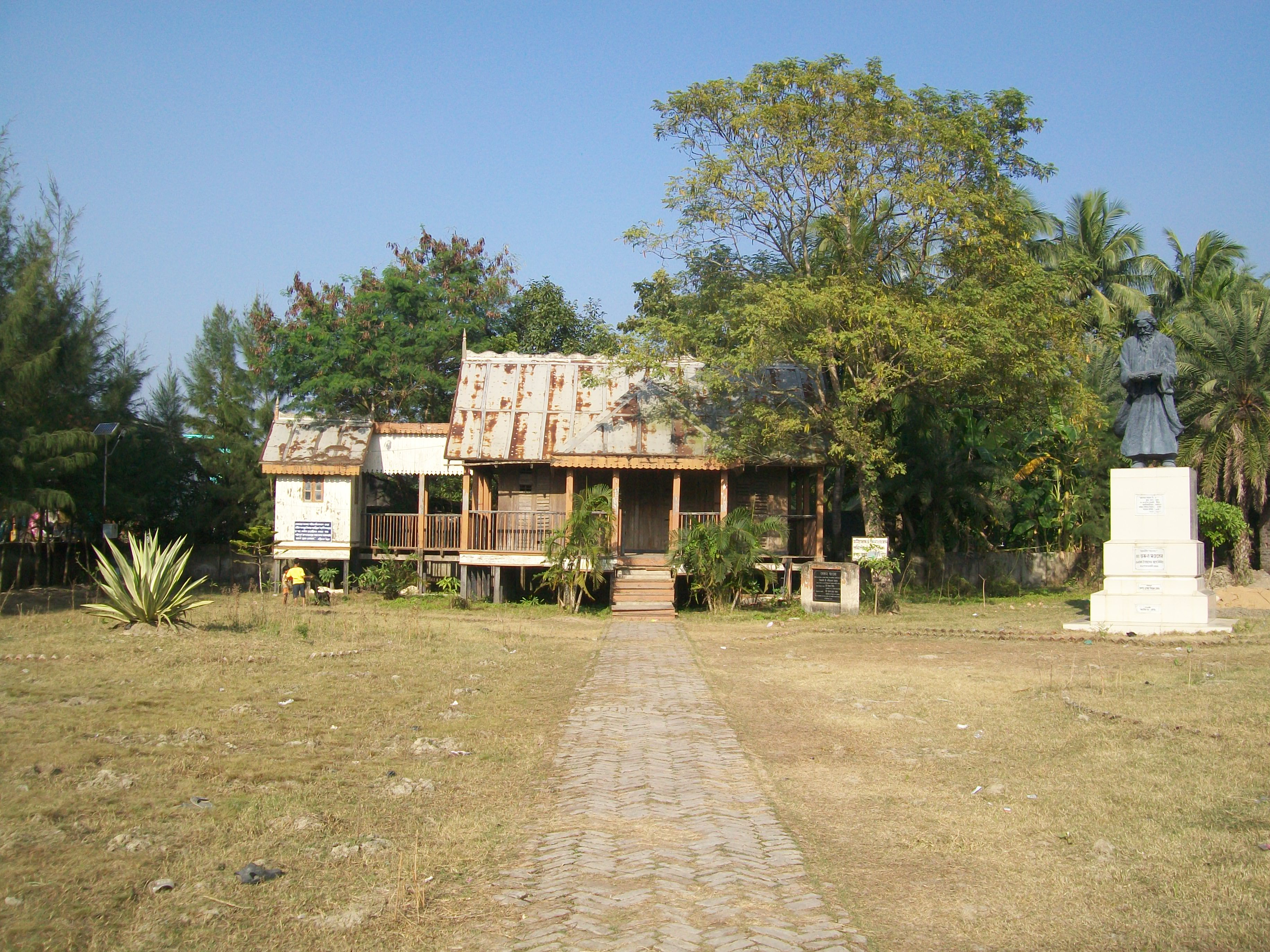
House of Sir Daniel Hamilton at Gosaba

Sir Daniel Mackinnon Hamilton, a Scotsman, had travelled to Kolkata to work for MacKinnon & McKenzie, a company with which he had family connections. The company sold tickets for the P&O shipping line, then one of the largest in the world. Hamilton became head of the company and master of an immense fortune, one of the richest men in British India. Another man may have taken his money and gone away but Hamilton set his eyes on the deltaic islands in south Bengal. In 1903, he bought 40 square kilometres (10,000 acres) of the tide country from the government – it included such islands as Gosaba, Rangabelia, and Satjelia. His efforts at developing these places brought in other people into these islands. They were people who dared not only to struggle against nature but also the predators that lived there – tigers, crocodiles, sharks and lizards. They killed so many people that Hamilton gave rewards to people who killed them. In December 1932 Rabindranath Tagore visited and stayed at Gosaba in the house of Sir Daniel Hamilton.

== Geography ==
Places in Canning subdivision (Canning I & II, Basanti, Gosaba CD blocks) in South 24 Parganas district
R: rural/ urban centre
Places linked with coastal activity are marked in blue
Owing to space constraints in the small map, the actual locations in a larger map may vary slightly

=== Area overview ===
Canning subdivision has a very low level of urbanization. Only 12.37% of the population lives in the urban areas and 87.63% lives in the rural areas. There are 8 census towns in Canning I CD block and only 2 in the rest of the subdivision. The entire district is situated in the Ganges Delta with numerous islands in the southern part of the region. The area (shown in the map alongside) borders on the Sundarbans National Park and a major portion of it is a part of the Sundarbans settlements. It is a flat low-lying area in the South Bidyadhari plains. The Matla River is prominent and there are many streams and water channels locally known as khals. A comparatively recent country-wide development is the guarding of the coastal areas with a special coastal force.

Note: The map alongside presents some of the notable locations in the subdivision. All places marked in the map are linked in the larger full screen map.

=== Location ===
Gosaba is located at 22°09′55″N 88°48′28″E. It has an average elevation of 6 metres (20 ft).

Gosaba is one of the main deltaic islands in the Sundarban region, bounded by the Matla and Zilli rivers/ creeks. It is the last inhabited area before the deep forests start. Kolkata to Sonakhali (opposite Basanti) is 100 kilometres (62 mi); it takes about three hours by road. Sonakhali to Gosaba is about 1½ hours by powered boat. Sundarbans are home to some 270 man-eating tigers. Sixteen of them have entered the villages of Gosaba between 2001 and 2004.

== Demographics ==
According to the 2011 Census of India Gosaba had a total population of 5,369, of which 2,681 (50%) were males and 2,688 (50%) were females. There were 503 persons in the age range of 0 to 6 years. The total number of literate persons in Gosaba was 3,994 (82.08% of the population over 6 years).

According to the 2001 census, Gosaba community development block had a population of 222,764 out of which 113,827 were males and 108,937 were females. The entire population is classified as rural.

== Civic administration ==
=== Gram panchayat ===
Gosaba is an intermediate panchayat (local self-government) under the South 24 Parganas district. Village panchayats under it are – Amtali, Bali I and II, Bipradaspur, Chhota Mollakhali, Gosaba, Kachukhali, Kumirmari, Lahiripur, Pathankhali, Radhanagar-Taranagar, Rangabelia, Satjelia and Sambhunagar.

=== Police station ===
Gosaba police station started functioning in 1965. It covers an area of 127 km^{2}, consisting of 4 islands. It has jurisdiction over parts of the Gosaba CD block. Earlier, Gosaba PS had jurisdiction across 9 islands.

=== CD block HQ ===
The headquarters of the Gosaba CD block are located at Gosaba village.

== Economy ==
=== Tourism ===
The main tourist centre in the region is Sajnekhali in the heart of the Sundarbans tiger reserve, where the state tourist department has a lodge with basic amenities. Sajnakhali Wildlife Sanctuary is about 1½ hours by boat from Gosaba. Most tourist boats go past Gosaba. Some tourists travel to Gosaba on their way to Pakhiralay (the home of the birds). Foreigners need a special permit to enter Sunderbans, which is issued in Kolkata by the Department of Tourism, Government of West Bengal. A small Jungle Camp is at Bali island, outside the tiger reserve and Sunderban Tiger Camp at Dayapur, Gosaba.

=== Power ===
Villages in the deltaic region of Sundarbans do not have access to conventional forms of energy. A 5x100 kW biomass-based power plant was installed at Gosaba island, in June 1997 and has been running successfully, serving about 650 consumers through a network of distribution lines. The power plant is being run on a commercial basis by the Gosaba Rural Energy Cooperative. A 500 kW gasifier-based power plant was commissioned in the remote island of Chhota Mollakhali in June 2001.

Plans are afoot to set up a 3.6 MW power plant in Durgaduani creek using tidal water. The Durgaduani creek is between the rivers Bidyadhari and Gomdi Khal. It is about 8.5 kilometres (5.3 mi) long and has an average width of 145 metres (476 ft). Tidal water will be stored and then let out to generate electricity using four turbines. There will be two gates at either end at Gosaba and Sonagaon to form a low head.

=== Honey collection ===
Around 20,000 kilograms (44,000 lb) of honey is collected every year from forests of Sundarbans. Mostly people from the Canning, Basanti, Gosaba, Kultali, Mathurapur, Patharpratima, Namkhana, Sagar and Kakdwip are honey collectors. The number of honey collectors has dwindled from around 1,500 a few years back to around 700 in 2007. From 1985 through 2004, about 75 honey collectors were killed by tigers in the forests. Now all honey collectors are insured for Rs. 50,000. The forest department has also intensified vigilance during the honey collection period. The range officers and guards are on full alert. No deaths have been reported since 2006.

== Education ==
Educational institutions in Gosaba - Sundarban Hazi Dasarat College (Pathankhali), Gosaba Rural Reconstruction (government-sponsored) Institution, Rangabelia High School, Sambhunagar High School, Bipradaspur High School (Manmathanagar), Mongol Chandra Vidyapith (Chotomollakhali), Satjelia Natavar Vidyayatan (Satjelia), Radhanagar Kali Bari High School (Radhanagar), Sri Gourangha High School (Dakshin Radhanagar), Jatindra Nath Sikshaniketan (Paschim Radhanagar), Satjelia Santigachhi High School, Dayapur P.C. Sen High School (Satjelia Dayapur), Rajat Jubilee High School (Rajat Jubilee, Lahiripur).

== Notable people ==
- Shyamal Bose (bishop)

== Healthcare ==
Although in South 24 Parganas district groundwater is affected by arsenic contamination, in Gosaba all the tubewells analysed were arsenic safe (below 10 μg/L). The probable reason may be that being a coastal area most of the tubewells draw water from less contaminated deep aquifers.

The World Wildlife Fund has organised workshops on the treatment of snakebite victims in Gosaba block with the local quacks, ojhas and gunins, people who attend the local patients, to enhance the scientific knowledge of such people.

Four launches with doctors carrying medicines, sophisticated portable X-ray and echo-cardiograph machines, provided by the French author Dominique Lapierre, move along the waterways of the Sundarbans to its furthest corners.Residents of such places as Sandeshkhali, Basanti, Gosaba and Kultali have felicitated him when he came in 2004.

Gosaba Rural Hospital at Gosaba, with 30 beds, is the major government medical facility in the Gosaba CD block.
