= Ghoshpur =

- Village
- Location in West Bengal, India Ghoshpur (India)
- Coordinates: 22.455867°N 88.867456°E
- Country: India
- State: West Bengal
- District: North 24 Parganas

Population (2011)
  - Total: 6,606

Languages
  - Official: Bengali, English
- Time zone: UTC+5:30 (IST)
- PIN: 743439
- Telephone/STD code: 03217
- Lok Sabha constituency: Basirhat
- Vidhan Sabha constituency: Sandeshkhali
- Website: north24parganas.nic.in

Ghoshpur is a village in Sandeshkhali I CD Block in the Basirhat subdivision of the North 24 Parganas district in the state of West Bengal, India.

== Demographics ==
As per the 2011 Census of India, Ghoshpur had a total population of 6,606, of which 3,330 (50%) were males and 3,276 (50%) were females. Population below 6 years was 725. The total number of literates in Ghoshpur was 4,293 (73.00% of the population over 6 years).

== Transport ==
Sandeshkhali I CD Block is served by Nazat PS. The CD Block headquarters are also located at Nazat, which is across the Besti River. One can reach Nazat by ferry from Ghoshpur ferry ghat to Boyermari ferryghat at Nazat.

== Education ==
Kalinagar Mahavidyalaya at Kalinagar is located nearby.

== Healthcare ==
Ghoshpur Rural Hospital at Ghoshpur with 30 beds functions as the main medical facility in Sandeshkhali I CD Block. There are primary health centres at Agarbati (Hatgachia PHC with 10 beds) and Nazat (with 6 beds).
