= Sandeshkhali II =

- Community development block
- Interactive map of Sandeshkhali II
- Coordinates: 22.36°N 88.90°E
- Country: India
- State: West Bengal
- District: North 24-Parganas

Government
  - Type: Representative democracy

Area
  - Total: 197.21 km^{2} (76.14 sq mi)
- Elevation: 6 m (20 ft)

Population (2011)
  - Total: 160,976
  - Density: 816.27/km^{2} (2,114.1/sq mi)

Languages
  - Official: Bengali, English

Literacy (2011)
  - Total literates: 98,805 (70.96%)
- Time zone: UTC+5:30 (IST)
- PIN: 743446 (Sandeshkhali)
- Telephone/STD code: 03218
- ISO 3166 code: IN-WB
- Vehicle registration: WB-23, WB-24, WB-25, WB-26
- Lok Sabha constituency: Basirhat
- Vidhan Sabha constituency: 123-Sandeshkhali, 126-Hingalganj
- Website: north24parganas.nic.in

The Hungry Tide
In the beginning…there was nothing but forests here. There were no people, no embankments, no fields. Just kada and bada, mud and mangrove. At high tide most of the land vanished under water. And everywhere you looked there were predators – tigers, crocodiles, sharks, leopards…This was a time when people were so desperate for the land that they were willing to sell themselves for a bigha or two.

— Amitav Ghosh

Sandeshkhali-II is a community development block that forms an administrative division in Basirhat subdivision of North 24 Parganas district in the Indian state of West Bengal.

== Geography ==
Sandeshkhali is located at 22°22′N 88°54′E.

Sandeshkhali II CD Block is bounded by Sandeshkhali I CD Block in the north, Hingalganj CD Block towards east, Basanti, Gosaba CD Blocks and Sundarbans in South 24 Parganas district in the south and Canning II CD Block in South 24 Parganas district in the west.

Sandeshkhali II CD Block is part of the North Bidyadhari Plain, one of the three physiographic regions in the district located in the lower Ganges Delta. The area is full of marshes and salt water lakes. The Bidyadhari has a long course through the central part of the district. The wide Dansa, Kalindi and Raimangal rivers flow through the area.

Sandeshkhali II CD Block has an area of 197.21 km^{2}. It has 1 panchayat samity, 8 gram panchayats, 103 gram sansads (village councils), 24 mouzas and 24 inhabited villages. Sandeshkhali police station serves this block. Headquarters of this CD Block is at Dwarir Jangle. Offices of Sandeshkhali-II Block are: Sandedhkhali-II BDO Office, Sandeshkhali BLRO Office, Sandeshkhali ADA Office, Sandeshkhali II BLDO Office

Gram panchayats of Sandeshkhali-II Block/Panchayat Samiti are: Bermajur-I, Bermajur-II, Sandeshkhali, Jeliakhali, Durgamandop, Korakati, Monipur and Khulna.

=== Sundarbans ===
The Sundarbans is a flat lowland susceptible to the storm surges along the 260 km shoreline of the Bay of Bengal. The total expanse of Sundarbans is about 2.05 million hectares (8,000 square miles). Of this, only 0.42 million hectares (1,629 square miles or 10,43,000 acres) are under the reserve forests including about 0.19 million hectares covered by creeks and channels. The area is prone to natural calamities such as cyclones, thunderstorms with occasional hail and floods. There are more than 63,400 km of embankments but the floods caused by high tidal bores, often wash away much of the embankments, already weakened and broken by earlier cyclonic storms.

In May 2009, the district was hit by high speed cyclone named Aila and subsequent rainfall which continued for two days. This created a disaster in 20 out of 22 blocks of the district. 10 out of 27 municipalities of the district were also severely affected.

Six CD Blocks of North 24 Parganas are included in the Sundabans area – Hingalganj, Hasnabad, Sandeskhali I and II, Minakhan and Haora. The south-eastern part of the district gradually merges into the Sunderbans.

== Demographics ==
=== Population ===
As per 2011 Census of India Sandeshkhali II CD Block had a total population of 160,976, all of which were rural. There were 81,921 (51%) males and 79,055 (49%) females. Population below 6 years was 21,732. Scheduled Castes numbered 72,300 (44.91%) and Scheduled Tribes numbered 37,695 (23.42%).

As per 2001 census, Sandeshkhali-II block has a total population of 136,247 out of which 70,114 were males and 66,133 were females.

Large villages in Sandeshkhali II Block (2011 census figures in brackets): Rampur (4,392), Jhupkhali (7,908), Bermajur (13,136), Dwarir Jangle (11,155), Khulna (5,958), Hatgachha (5,960), Sitalia (6,092), Atapur (5,287), Tushkhali (9,645), Bhangatushkhali (7,346), Jeliakhali (5,084), Jheliakhali Paschim Khanda (10,193), Sukhdoani (4,481), Daudpur (7,510), Joygopalpur (7,761), Korakati (6,695), Durgamandap (8,932), Dhuchnikhali (7,266) and Manipur (8,152).

North 24 Parganas district is densely populated, mainly because of the influx of refugees from East Pakistan (later Bangladesh). With a density of population of 2,182 per km^{2} in 1971, it was 3rd in terms of density per km^{2} in West Bengal after Kolkata and Howrah, and 20th in India. According to the District Human Development Report: North 24 Parganas, “High density is also explained partly by the rapid growth of urbanization in the district. In 1991, the percentage of urban population in the district has been 51.23.”

Decadal Population Growth Rate (%) View chart definition.

The decadal growth of population in Sandeshkhali II CD Block in 2001-2011 was 18.09%. The decadal growth of population in Sandeshkhali II CD Block in 1991-2001 was 14.65%.

The decadal growth rate of population in North 24 Parganas district was as follows: 47.9% in 1951-61, 34.5% in 1961-71, 31.4% in 1971-81, 31.7% in 1981-91, 22.7% in 1991-2001 and 12.0% in 2001-11. The decadal growth rate for West Bengal in 2001-11 was 13.93%. The decadal growth rate for West Bengal was 17.84% in 1991-2001, 24.73% in 1981-1991 and 23.17% in 1971-1981.

Only a small portion of the border with Bangladesh has been fenced and it is popularly referred to as a porous border. It is freely used by Bangladeshi infiltrators, terrorists, smugglers, criminals. et al.

=== Literacy ===
As per the 2011 census, the total number of literates in Sandeshkhali II CD Block was 98,805 (70.96% of the population over 6 years) out of which males numbered 56,205 (79.12% of the male population over 6 years) and females numbered 42,600 (62.46% of the female population over 6 years). The gender disparity (the difference between female and male literacy rates) was 16.66%. The percentage of female literacy in Sandeshkhali II is the lowest amongst all the CD Blocks in North 24 Parganas district. The gender disparity in literacy is the highest amongst all the CD Blocks in North 24 Parganas district.

See also – List of West Bengal districts ranked by literacy rate

Literacy in CD blocks of
North 24 Parganas district
Barasat Sadar subdivision
Amdanga – 80.69%
Deganga – 79.65%
Barasat I – 81.50%
Barasat II – 77.71%
Habra I – 83.15%
Habra II – 81.05%
Rajarhat – 83.13%
Basirhat subdivision
Baduria – 78.75%
Basirhat I – 72.10%
Basirhat II – 78.30%
Haroa – 73.13%
Hasnabad – 71.47%
Hingalganj – 76.85%
Minakhan – 71.33%
Sandeshkhali I – 71.08%
Sandeshkhali II – 70.96%
Swarupnagar – 77.57%
Bangaon subdivision
Bagdah – 75.30%
Bangaon – 79.71%
Gaighata – 82.32%
Barrackpore subdivision
Barrackpore I – 85.91%
Barrackpore II – 84.53%
Source: 2011 Census: CD Block Wise
Primary Census Abstract Data

=== Language and religion ===
Religion in Sandeshkhali II CD block (2011)
Hinduism	77.17%
Islam	22.27%
Christianity	0.43%
Other or not stated	0.13%

In the 2011 census Hindus numbered 124,229 and formed 77.17% of the population in Sandeshkhali II CD Block. Muslims numbered 35,855 and formed 22.27% of the population. Others numbered 892 and formed 0.56% of the population.

In 1981 Hindus numbered 76,282 and formed 81.23% of the population and Muslims numbered 17,574 and formed 18.50% of the population in Sandeshkhali I CD Block. In 1981 Hindus numbered 78,701 and formed 81.03% of the population and Muslims numbered 17,999 and formed 18.56% of the population in Sandeshkhali II CD Block. In 1991 Hindus numbered 187,572 and formed 78.34% of the population and Muslims numbered 51,862 and formed 21.66% of the population in Sandeshkhali I and Sandeshkhali II CD Blocks taken together. (In 1981 and 1991 census was conducted as per jurisdiction of the police station). In 2001 in Sandeshkhali II CD block, Hindus were 108,035 (79.25%) and Muslims 27,696 (20.32%).

Bengali is the predominant language, spoken by 99.64% of the population.

== Rural Poverty ==
27.21% of households in Sandeshkhali II CD Block lived below poverty line in 2001, against an average of 29.28% in North 24 Parganas district.

== Economy ==
=== Livelihood ===
Livelihood
in Sandeshkhali II CD Block
1. Cultivators (14.8%)
2. Agricultural labourers (56.4%)
3. Household industries (3.02%)
4. Other Workers (25.8%)

In Sandeshkhali II CD Block in 2011, amongst the class of total workers, cultivators numbered 9,134 and formed 14.79% of the total workers, agricultural labourers numbered 34,182 and formed 56.38%, household industry workers numbered 1,863 and formed 3.02% and other workers numbered 15,950 and formed 25.81%. Total workers numbered 61,749 and formed 38.36% of the total population, and non-workers numbered 99,227 and formed 61.64% of the population.

In more than 30 percent of the villages in North 24 Parganas, agriculture or household industry is no longer the major source of livelihood for the main workers there. The CD Blocks in the district can be classified as belonging to three categories: border areas, Sundarbans area and other rural areas. The percentage of other workers in the other rural areas category is considerably higher than those in the border areas and Sundarbans area.

Note: In the census records a person is considered a cultivator, if the person is engaged in cultivation/ supervision of land owned by self/government/institution. When a person who works on another person’s land for wages in cash or kind or share, is regarded as an agricultural labourer. Household industry is defined as an industry conducted by one or more members of the family within the household or village, and one that does not qualify for registration as a factory under the Factories Act. Other workers are persons engaged in some economic activity other than cultivators, agricultural labourers and household workers. It includes factory, mining, plantation, transport and office workers, those engaged in business and commerce, teachers, entertainment artistes and so on.

=== Infrastructure ===
There are 24 inhabited villages in Sandeshkhali II CD Block. 100% villages have power supply and drinking water supply. 19 villages (79.17%) have post offices. 21 villages (87.50%) have telephones (including landlines, public call offices and mobile phones). 12 villages (50.00%) have a pucca approach road and 14 villages (58.33%) have transport communication (includes bus service, rail facility and navigable waterways). 3 villages (12.50%) have agricultural credit societies and 10 villages (41.67% ) have banks.

=== Power ===
The remote villages and hamlets situated in the area suffer from chronic shortage of energy due to non-availability of grid power. It is extremely difficult to extend high voltage transmission lines because of technical limitations in an area with inhospitable terrain and prohibitive cost. A scheme is being formulated to cover about 750,000 people in the difficult areas of Sundarbans with non-conventional energy power by 2012. The scheme covers Gosaba, Sagar, Pathar Pratima, Namkhana, Kultali, Hingalganj and Sandeshkhali.

=== Agriculture ===
The North 24 Parganas district Human Development Report opines that in spite of agricultural productivity in North 24 Parganas district being rather impressive 81.84% of rural population suffered from shortage of food. With a high urbanisation of 54.3% in 2001, the land use pattern in the district is changing quite fast and the area under cultivation is declining. However, agriculture is still the major source of livelihood in the rural areas of the district.

From 1977 onward, major land reforms took place in West Bengal. Land in excess of land ceiling was acquired and distributed amongst the peasants. Following land reforms land ownership pattern has undergone transformation. In 2010-11, persons engaged in agriculture in Sandeshkhali II CD Block could be classified as follows: bargadars 5,828 (8.25%), patta (document) holders 14,081 (19.94%), small farmers (possessing land between 1 and 2 hectares) 3,880 (5.49%), marginal farmers (possessing land up to 1 hectare) 20,664 (29.26%) and agricultural labourers 26,164 (37.05%).

Sandeshkhali II CD Block had 7 fertiliser depots, no seed store and 82 fair price shops in 2010-11.

In 2010-11, Sandeshkhali II CD Block produced 3,837 tonnes of Aman paddy, the main winter crop from 5,008 hectares, 2,193 tonnes of Boro paddy (spring crop) from 1,042 hectares, 5,086 tonnes of Aus paddy (summer crop) from 1,936 hectares and 925 tonnes of potatoes from 29 hectare. It also produced til (oilseed).

There were no irrigation facilities in Sandeshkhali II CD Block in 2010-11.

=== Pisciculture ===
In 2010-11, the net area under effective pisciculture in Sandeshkhali II CD Block was 2,725.04 hectares. 12,346 persons were engaged in the profession. Approximate annual production was 81,751.2 quintals.

=== Banking ===
In 2010-11, Sandeshkhali II CD Block had offices of 3 commercial banks and 3 gramin banks.at last open State Bank of India

=== Microcredit ===
Microcredit is serving as an effective tool of economic emancipation of women, empowering them to fight against many social evils and the age-old atrocities in the villages. JYDC an NGO, in collaboration with National Bank for Agriculture and Rural Development (NABARD) has established 1047 self-help groups with 12,000 members spread over 24 villages (mouza). Self-help group members of Sandeshkhali raised Rs.40,000/-loan from Bank of Baroda to start a poultry farm.(31 March 2008, BDO, SDK-II)

== Transport ==
In 2010-11, Sandeshkhali II CD Block had 13 ferry services and 4 originating/ terminating bus routes. The nearest railway station is 25 km from CD Block headquarters.

Local roads link Sandeshkhali to Basanti, Basirhat and Hingalganj.

== Education ==
In 2010-11, Sandeshkhali II CD Block had 90 primary schools with 11,505 students, 1 middle school with 341 students, 15 high schools with 7,783 students and 6 higher secondary schools with 5,417 students. Sandeshkhali II CD Block had 336 institutions for special and non-formal education with 16,731 students.

As per the 2011 census, in Sandeshkhali II CD Block, amongst the 24 inhabited villages, all villages had a school, 23 villages had more than 1 primary school, 18 villages had at least 1 primary and 1 middle school and 18 villages had at least 1 middle and 1 secondary school.

Schools of Sandeshkhali-II Block are: Sandeshkhali Radharani High School (HS), Bhagabati Devi Balika Vidyalaya, Khulna P.C. Law Vidyalaya (HS), Sitalia High School (HS), Hatgachha K.C.A. High School (HS), Bouthakurani Uttam Chandra High School, Atapur Kenaram High School (HS), Doutpur H.L. Sikshaniketan (HS), D.D.T. Sahid Smriti Vidyalaya.

== Healthcare ==
In 2011, Sandeshkhali II CD Block had 1 rural hospital and 2 primary health centres, with total 36 beds and 5 doctors (excluding private bodies). It had 35 family welfare subcentres. 1,212 patients were treated indoor and 22,544 patients were treated outdoor in the hospitals, health centres and subcentres of the CD Block.

Sandeshkhali Rural Hospital at Sandeshkhali with 26 beds functions as the main medical facility in Sandeshkhali II CD Block. There are primary health centres at Korakanthi (with 10 beds) and Jeliakhali (with 6 beds).

Although in North 24 Parganas district groundwater is affected by arsenic contamination, tube wells in Sandeshkhali-II block are arsenic safe according to Indian standard (50 μg/L) and in Sandeshkhali-I block only 0.6% of tube wells exceed 50 μg/L.(study conducted by JYDC, an NGO). A lab was set up by JYDC in collaboration with UNICEF and the government of West Bengal to monitor drinking water in the area. The probable reason may be, in Sandeshkhali, most of the tube wells are deep. Shallow tub ewells are saline, so people do not construct shallow tube wells. A study of iodine deficiency disorder amongst children found that prevalence of goitre amongst school children was very high at Sandeshkhali.

Four launches with doctors carrying medicines, portable X-ray and echo-cardiograph machines, provided by the French author Dominique Lapierre move along the waterways of the Sundarbans to its furthest corners. Residents of such places as Sandeshkhali, Basanti, Gosaba and Kultali have felicitated him when he came in 2004.
