= Jayanta Naskar =

Indian politician (died 2021)

MLA of Gosaba Vidhan Sabha Constituency
- In office 2011–2021
- Preceded by: Chittaranjan Mondal

Personal details
- Born: 1947 or 1948
- Died: 19 June 2021 (aged 73) Kolkata, India
- Cause of death: COVID-19
- Party: Trinamool Congress

Jayanta Naskar (1947/8 – 19 June 2021) was an Indian politician. He served as MLA of Gosaba Vidhan Sabha Constituency in the West Bengal Legislative Assembly. He was an Trinamool Congress politician.

Naskar died at a hospital in Kolkata, India due to COVID-19.
