= Bikarna Naskar =

Indian politician (born 1985)

Bikarna Naskar (born 1985) is an Indian politician from West Bengal. He is a member of West Bengal Legislative Assembly from the Gosaba Assembly constituency, which is reserved for Scheduled Caste community, in South 24 Parganas district representing the Bharatiya Janata Party.

== Early life and education ==
Naskar is from Basanti, South 24 Parganas district, West Bengal. He is the son of the late Banshinath Naskar. He studied till Class 10 at Narayanitala Ramkrishna Vidyamandir and passed the Madhyamik exams in 2000. He runs his own business. He declared assets or Rs.14 lakhs in his affidavit to the Election Commission of India.

== Career ==
Naskar won the Gosaba Assembly constituency representing the Bharatiya Janata Party in the 2026 West Bengal Legislative Assembly election. He polled 1,08,492 votes and defeated his nearest rival, Subrata Mondal of the All India Trinamool Congress (AITC), by a margin of 16,100 votes.
