= Hingalganj =

- Community development block
- Interactive map of Hingalganj
- Coordinates: 22.470803°N 88.977346°E
- Country: India
- State: West Bengal
- District: North 24 Parganas

Government
  - Type: Representative democracy

Area
  - Total: 238.80 km^{2} (92.20 sq mi)
- Elevation: 7 m (23 ft)

Population (2011)
  - Total: 175,545
  - Density: 735.11/km^{2} (1,903.9/sq mi)

Languages
  - Official: Bengali, English

Literacy (2011)
  - Total literates: 119,630 (76.85%)
- Time zone: UTC+5:30 (IST)
- PIN: 743435 (Hingalganj)
- Telephone/STD code: 03217
- ISO 3166 code: IN-WB
- Vehicle registration: WB-23, WB-24, WB-25, WB-26
- Lok Sabha constituency: Basirhat
- Vidhan Sabha constituency: Hingalganj
- Website: north24parganas.nic.in

Hingalganj is a community development block that forms an administrative division in Basirhat subdivision of North 24 Parganas district in the Indian state of West Bengal.

== Etymology ==
The name Hingalganj came after the name of Tillman Henkel, district judge and magistrate in Jessore district from 1781. He developed the settlement there.

== Geography ==
Surrounded by rivers on all sides, this small island, Hingalganj, is located at 22°28′15″N 88°58′38″E.

Hingalganj CD Block is bounded by Hasnabad CD Block in the north, Kaliganj and Shyamnagar upazilas in Satkhira District of Bangladesh in the east, Sundarbans in the south and the lower portion of the west, Canning II CD Block in South 24 Parganas district in the lower portion of the west, and Sandeshkhali I and Sandeshkhali II CD Blocks in the upper portion of the west.

Hingalganj CD Block is part of the Ichhamati-Raimangal Plain, one of the three physiographic regions in the district located in the lower Ganges Delta. It contains soil of mature black or brownish loam to recent alluvium. The Ichhamati flows through the eastern part of the district.

Hingalganj CD Block has an area of 238.80 km^{2}. It has 1 panchayat samity, 9 gram panchayats, 124 gram sansads (village councils), 44 mouzas and 44 inhabited villages, as per the District Statistical Handbook: North 24 Parganas. Hingalganj and Hemnagar police stations serve this block. Headquarters of this CD Block is at Hingalganj.

Gram panchayats of Hingalganj block/ panchayat samiti are: Bishpur, Hingalganj, Rupamari, Dulduli, Jogeshganj, Sahebkhali, Gobindakati, Kalitala and Sandelerbil.

=== Sundarbans ===
The Sundarbans is a flat lowland susceptible to the tidal waves along the 260 km shoreline of the Bay of Bengal. The total expanse of Sundarbans is about 2.05 million hectares (8,000 square miles). Of this, only 0.42 million hectares (1,629 square miles or 10,43,000 acres) are under the reserve forests including about 0.19 million hectares covered by creeks and channels. The area is prone to natural calamities such as cyclones, thunderstorms with occasional hail and floods. There are more than 63,400 km of embankments but the floods caused by high tidal bores, often wash away much of the embankments, already weakened and broken by earlier cyclonic storms.

In May 2009, the district was hit by high speed cyclone named Aila and subsequent rainfall which continued for two days. This created a disaster in 20 out of 22 blocks of the district. 10 out of 27 municipalities of the district were also severely affected.

Six CD Blocks of North 24 Parganas are included in the Sundabans area – Hingalganj, Hasnabad, Sandeskhali I and II, Minakhan and Haora. The south-eastern part of the district gradually merges into the Sunderbans.

== Demographics ==
=== Population ===
As per 2011 Census of India Hingalganj CD Block had a total population of 174,545, of which 159,469 were rural and 15,076 were urban. There were 88,937 (51%) males and 85,608 (49%) females. Population below 6 years was 18,880. Scheduled Castes numbered 115,227 (66.02%) and Scheduled Tribes numbered 12,743 (7.30%).

As per 2001 census, Hingalganj block has a total population of 156,568 out of which 80,487 were males and 76,081 were females.

There are two census towns in Hingalganj CD Block (2011 census figures in brackets): Hingalganj (8,179) and Bankra (6,897).

Large villages in Hingalganj CD Block (2011 census figures in brackets): Durgapur Baylani (7,115), Bispur (6,643), Rupmari (4,717), Bhandarkhali (5,832), Sandelerbil (10,401), Mamudpur (8,942), Sahebkhali (5,792), Ramapur (6,357), Madhabkati (4,304), Patghara (6,270), Jogeshganj (7,082), Parghumti (6,581), Shridhar Kati (7,687), Malekanghumti (5,398), Kalitala (6,609) and Samsernagar (4,394).

North 24 Parganas district is densely populated, mainly because of the influx of refugees from East Pakistan (later Bangladesh). With a density of population of 2,182 per km^{2} in 1971, it was 3rd in terms of density per km^{2} in West Bengal after Kolkata and Howrah, and 20th in India. According to the District Human Development Report: North 24 Parganas, “High density is also explained partly by the rapid growth of urbanization in the district. In 1991, the percentage of urban population in the district has been 51.23.”

Decadal Population Growth Rate (%)

View source data.

The decadal growth of population in Hingalganj CD Block in 2001-2011 was 11.60%. The decadal growth of population in Hingalganj CD Block in 1991-2001 was 9.92%.

The decadal growth rate of population in North 24 Parganas district was as follows: 47.9% in 1951-61, 34.5% in 1961-71, 31.4% in 1971-81, 31.7% in 1981-91, 22.7% in 1991-2001 and 12.0% in 2001-11. The decadal growth rate for West Bengal in 2001-11 was 13.93%. The decadal growth rate for West Bengal was 17.84% in 1991-2001, 24.73% in 1981-1991 and 23.17% in 1971-1981.

Only a small portion of the border with Bangladesh has been fenced and it is popularly referred to as a porous border. It is freely used by Bangladeshi infiltrators, terrorists, smugglers, criminals. et al.

=== Literacy ===
As per the 2011 census, the total number of literates in Hingalganj CD Block was 119,630 (76.85% of the population over 6 years) out of which males numbered 66,858 (84.24% of the male population over 6 years) and females numbered 52,772 (69.17% of the female population over 6 years). The gender disparity (the difference between female and male literacy rates) was 15.07%.

See also – List of West Bengal districts ranked by literacy rate

Literacy in CD blocks of
North 24 Parganas district
Barasat Sadar subdivision
Amdanga – 80.69%
Deganga – 79.65%
Barasat I – 81.50%
Barasat II – 77.71%
Habra I – 83.15%
Habra II – 81.05%
Rajarhat – 83.13%
Basirhat subdivision
Baduria – 78.75%
Basirhat I – 72.10%
Basirhat II – 78.30%
Haroa – 73.13%
Hasnabad – 71.47%
Hingalganj – 76.85%
Minakhan – 71.33%
Sandeshkhali I – 71.08%
Sandeshkhali II – 70.96%
Swarupnagar – 77.57%
Bangaon subdivision
Bagdah – 75.30%
Bangaon – 79.71%
Gaighata – 82.32%
Barrackpore subdivision
Barrackpore I – 85.91%
Barrackpore II – 84.53%
Source: 2011 Census: CD Block Wise
Primary Census Abstract Data

=== Language and religion ===
Religion in Hingalganj CD block (2011)
Hinduism	87.97%
Islam	11.82%
Other or not stated	0.21%

In the 2011 census Hindus numbered 153,550 and formed 87.97% of the population in Hingalganj CD Block. Muslims numbered 20,623 and formed 11.82% of the population. Others numbered 372 and formed 0.21% of the population.

In 1981 Hindus numbered 90,128 and formed 86.00% of the population and Muslims numbered 14,671 and formed 14.00% of the population. In 1991 Hindus numbered 120,180 and formed 84.46% of the population and Muslims numbered 22,111 and formed 15.54% of the population in Hingalganj CD Block. (In 1981 and 1991 census was conducted as per jurisdiction of the police station). In 2001 in Hingalganj CD block, Hindus were 138,936 (88.83%) and Muslims 17,280 (11.05%).

Bengali is the predominant language, spoken by 99.64% of the population.

== Rural Poverty ==
44.50% of households in Hingalganj CD Block lived below poverty line in 2001, against an average of 29.28% in North 24 Parganas district.

=== Livelihood ===
Livelihood
in Hingalganj CD Block
1. Cultivators (14.7%)
2. Agricultural labourers (53.4%)
3. Household industries (9.35%)
4. Other Workers (22.5%)

In Hingalganj CD Block in 2011, amongst the class of total workers, cultivators numbered 10,957 and formed 14.70% of the total workers, agricultural labourers numbered 39,809 and formed 53.42%, household industry workers numbered 6,996 and formed 9.35% and other workers numbered 16,783 and formed 22.52%. Total workers numbered 74,515 and formed 42.69% of the total population, and non-workers numbered 100,030 and formed 57.31% of the population.

In more than 30 percent of the villages in North 24 Parganas, agriculture or household industry is no longer the major source of livelihood for the main workers there. The CD Blocks in the district can be classified as belonging to three categories: border areas, Sundarbans area and other rural areas. The percentage of other workers in the other rural areas category is considerably higher than those in the border areas and Sundarbans area.

Note: In the census records a person is considered a cultivator, if the person is engaged in cultivation/ supervision of land owned by self/government/institution. When a person who works on another person’s land for wages in cash or kind or share, is regarded as an agricultural labourer. Household industry is defined as an industry conducted by one or more members of the family within the household or village, and one that does not qualify for registration as a factory under the Factories Act. Other workers are persons engaged in some economic activity other than cultivators, agricultural labourers and household workers. It includes factory, mining, plantation, transport and office workers, those engaged in business and commerce, teachers, entertainment artistes and so on.

=== Infrastructure ===
There are 42 inhabited villages in Hingalganj CD Block, as per the District Census Handbook: North 24 Parganas. 100% villages have power supply and drinking water supply. 25 villages (59.52%) have post offices. 38 villages (90.48%) have telephones (including landlines, public call offices and mobile phones). 30 villages (71.43%) have a pucca approach road and 14 villages (33.33%) have transport communication (includes bus service, rail facility and navigable waterways). 10 villages (23.81%) have agricultural credit societies and 4 villages (9.52% ) have banks.

=== Agriculture ===
The North 24 Parganas district Human Development Report opines that in spite of agricultural productivity in North 24 Parganas district being rather impressive 81.84% of rural population suffered from shortage of food. With a high urbanisation of 54.3% in 2001, the land use pattern in the district is changing quite fast and the area under cultivation is declining. However, agriculture is still the major source of livelihood in the rural areas of the district.

From 1977 on wards major land reforms took place in West Bengal. Land in excess of land ceiling was acquired and distributed amongst the peasants. Following land reforms land ownership pattern has undergone transformation. In 2010-11, persons engaged in agriculture in Hingalganj CD Block could be classified as follows: bargadars 5,024 (6.68%), patta (document) holders 26,534 (32.56%), small farmers (possessing land between 1 and 2 hectares) 4,200 (5.58%), marginal farmers (possessing land up to 1 hectare) 19, 578(26.01%) and agricultural labourers 19,921 (26.47%).

Hingalganj CD Block had 70 fertiliser depots, 23 seed stores and no fair price shop in 2010-11.

In 2010-11, Hingalganj CD Block produced 19,915 tonnes of Aman paddy, the main winter crop from 10,132 hectares, 1,236 tonnes of Boro paddy (spring crop) from 385 hectares, 5,501 tonnes of Aus paddy (summer crop) from 2,094 hectares, 335 tonnes of wheat from 124 hectares, 244 tonnes of jute from 12 hectares and 21 tonnes of potatoes from 1 hectare. It also produced pulses and oilseeds.

There were no irrigation facilities in Hingalganj CD Block in 2010-11.

=== Pisciculture ===
In 2010-11, the net area under effective pisciculture in Hingalganj CD Block was 1,126.73 hectares. 12,243 persons were engaged in the profession. Approximate annual production was 33,801.9 quintals.

=== Banking ===
In 2010-11, Hingalganj CD Block had offices of 1 commercial bank and 3 gramin banks.

== Transport ==
In 2010-11, Hingalganj CD Block had 8 ferry services and 1 originating/ terminating bus route. The nearest railway station is 16 km from CD Block headquarters.

Local roads link Hingalganj with Sandeshkhali and Basirhat.

== Education ==
In 2010-11, Hingalganj CD Block had 127 primary schools with 10,150 students, 5 middle schools with 2,386 students, 16 high schools with 8,446 students and 7 higher secondary schools with 8,372 students. Hingalganj CD Block had 1 general college with 1,312 students and 377 institutions for special and non-formal education with 12,789 students.

Hingalganj Mahavidyalaya was established at Hingalganj in 2005.

As per the 2011 census, in Hingalganj CD Block, amongst the 42 inhabited villages, 3 villages did not have a school, 34 villages had more than 1 primary school, 22 villages had at least 1 primary and 1 middle school and 19 villages had at least 1 middle and 1 secondary school.

== Healthcare ==
In 2011, Hingalganj CD Block had 1 rural hospital and 3 primary health centres, with total 18 beds and 9 doctors (excluding private bodies). It had 33 family welfare subcentres. 13,883 patients were treated in the hospitals, health centres and subcentres of the CD Block.

Sanderbil Rural Hospital at Sandelerbil, with 30 beds, is the main medical facility in Hingalganj CD Block, there are primary health centres at Hingalganj (with 6 beds) and Jogeshganj (with 10 beds).

Hingalganj CD Block is one of the areas where ground water is affected by arsenic contamination. In the southern part of the CD Block water from shallow tube wells is saline and so there are only deep tube wells with no arsenic. Arsenic is there in the shallow tube wells in the northern part of the CD Block.
