= Gosaba (community development block) =

Community Development Block in West Bengal, India

- Community Development Block
- Location of Gosaba community development block in South 24 Parganas district
- Coordinates: 22.1652°N 88.8079°E
- Country: India
- State: West Bengal
- Division: Presidency
- District: South 24 Parganas
- Subdivision: Canning
- Headquarters: Gosaba

Government
  - Gram Panchayats: Amtali, Bali-I, Bali-II, Bipradaspur, Chhota Mollakhali, Gosaba, Kachukhali, Kumirmari, Lahiripur, Pathankhali, Radhanagar Taranagar, Rangabelia, Satjelia, Shambhunagar
  - Lok Sabha constituencies: Jaynagar
  - Vidhan Sabha constituencies: Gosaba

Area
  - Total: 296.73 km^{2} (114.57 sq mi)

Population (2011)
  - Total: 246,598
  - Density: 831.05/km^{2} (2,152.4/sq mi)

Demographics
  - Literacy: 78.98 per cent
  - Sex ratio: 959 ♂/♀

Languages
  - Official: Bengali
  - Additional official: English
- Time zone: UTC+05:30 (IST)
- Website: s24pgs.gov.in

Gosaba is a community development block that forms an administrative division in Canning subdivision of South 24 Parganas district in the Indian state of West Bengal.

== Geography ==

Gosaba CD block is located at 22°09′55″N 88°48′28″E. It has an average elevation of 6 metres (20 ft).

Gosaba CD block is bounded by Sandeshkhali II CD block in North 24 Parganas district in the north, Basanti CD block in the west and Sundarbans forests in the east and south. On the east, across the forests, there is the border with Satkhira District of Bangladesh. The Raimangal and Kalindi rivers run along the India-Bangladesh border.

South 24 Parganas district is divided into two distinct physiographic zones: the marine-riverine delta in the north and the marine delta zone in the south. As the sea receded southwards, in the sub-recent geological period, a large low-lying plain got exposed. Both tidal inflows and the rivers have been depositing sediments in this plain. The periodical collapse of both the natural levees and man-made embankments speed up the process of filling up of the depressions containing brackish water wetlands. The marine delta in the south is formed of interlacing tidal channels. As non-saline water for irrigation is scarce, agriculture is monsoon dominated. Some parts of the wetlands are still preserved for raising fish.

Gosaba CD block has an area of 296.73 km^{2}. It has 1 panchayat samity, 14 gram panchayats, 147 gram sansads (village councils), 51 mouzas and 50 inhabited villages, as per District Statistical Handbook for South Twenty-four Parganas. Gosaba and Sundarban Coastal police stations serve this CD Block. Headquarters of this CD block is at Gosaba.

Gosaba CD block has 372.5 km of embankments, the highest amongst the thirteen Sundarban CD Blocks. Breaches in these embankments varied from 6 km in 2003–04 to 54 km in 2006–07. Embankments raised along rivers are of critical importance for the safety of lives and protection of crops, against daily tides and tidal surges. Technologically the embankment structures are weak and there is need of proper drainage of accumulated rain water through sluice gates. Crude cuts in embankments for drainage of accumulated rain water and channels built for providing water to large fisheries (bheris) also add to the hazards. Cyclones and tropical depressions are regular threats.

Gram panchayats of Gosaba CD block/panchayat samiti are: Amtali, Bali-I, Bali-II, Bipradaspur, Chhota Mollakhali, Gosaba, Kachukhali, Kumirmari, Lahiripur, Pathankhali, Radhanagar Taranagar, Rangabelia, Satjelia and Shambhunagar.

== Demographics ==
=== Population ===
As per 2011 Census of India, Gosaba CD block had a total population of 246,598, all of which were rural. There were 125,901 (51%) males and 120,688 (49%) females. Population below 6 years was 27,841. Scheduled Castes numbered 154,484 (62.69%) and Scheduled Tribes numbered 23,343 (9.47%).

As per 2001 Census of India, Gosaba CD block had a total population of 222,764, out of which 113,827 were males and 108,937 were females. Gosaba CD block registered a population growth of 11.10 per cent during the 1991-2001 decade. Decadal growth for South 24 Parganas district was 20.89%. Decadal growth in West Bengal was 17.84%. Scheduled Castes at 146,060 formed more than one-half the population. Scheduled Tribes numbered 22,561.

Large villages (with 4,000+ population) in Gosaba CD block (2011 census figures in brackets): Radhanagar Paschim (4,196), Radhanagar Purba (4,583), Chimta (6,332), Amtali (5,650), Puinjali (5,455), Kumirmari (17,451), Kalidaspur (5,724), Taranagar (6,572), Baramollakhali (4,127), Radhanagar Dakshin (4,475), Harishpur (4,878), Kamakhyapur (4,577), Kamarpara (4,091), Chandipur (5,456), Manmathanagar (7,971), Gosaba (5,369), Arampur (6,618), Birajnagar (5,328), Bijoynagar (6,507), Bally (6,234), Amlamethi (9,298), Kachukhali (5,176), Satjalia (8,757), Dayapur (4,972), Chhota Mollakhali (10,537), Sudhansupur (4,352), Luxbagan (4,504), Sadhupur (6,992) and Lahiripur (6,851).

Other villages in Gosaba CD block include (2011 census figures in brackets): Pathankhali (1,414), Pakhiralay (3,946), Rangabalia (3,620), Sambhunagar (2,886) and Hamilton Abad (3,761).

=== Literacy ===
As per the 2011 census, the total number of literates in Gosaba CD block was 172,781 (78.98% of the population over 6 years) out of which males numbered 96,642 (86.40% of the male population over 6 years) and females numbered 76,139 (71.22% of the female population over 6 years). The gender disparity (the difference between female and male literacy rates) was 15.18%.

As per 2011 Census of India, literacy in South 24 Parganas district was 77.51 Literacy in West Bengal was 77.08% in 2011. Literacy in India in 2011 was 74.04%.

As per 2001 Census of India, Gosaba CD block had a total literacy of 68.93 per cent for the 6+ age group. While male literacy was 80.74 per cent female literacy was 56.60 per cent. South 24 Parganas district had a total literacy of 69.45 per cent, male literacy being 79.19 per cent and female literacy being 59.01 per cent.

See also – List of West Bengal districts ranked by literacy rate

Literacy in CD blocks of
South 24 Parganas district
Alipore Sadar subdivision
Bishnupur I – 78.33%
Bishnupur II – 81.37%
Budge Budge I – 80.57%
Budge Budge II – 79.13%
Thakurpukur Maheshtala – 83.54%
Baruipur subdivision
Baruipur – 76.46%
Bhangar I – 72.06%
Bhangar II – 74.49%
Jaynagar I – 73.17%
Jaynagar II – 69.71%
Kultali – 69.37%
Sonarpur – 79.70%
Canning subdivision
Basanti – 68.32%
Canning I – 70.76%
Canning II – 66.51%
Gosaba – 78.98%
Diamond Harbour subdivision
Diamond Harbour I – 75.72%
Diamond Harbour II – 76.91%
Falta – 77.17%
Kulpi – 75.49%
Magrahat I – 73.82%
Magrahat II – 77.41%
Mandirbazar – 75.89%
Mathurapur I – 73.93%
Mathurapur II – 77.77%
Kakdwip subdivision
Kakdwip – 77.93%
Namkhana – 85.72
Patharpratima – 82.11%
Sagar – 84.21%
Source: 2011 Census: CD Block Wise
Primary Census Abstract Data

=== Language ===
Languages of Gosaba block (2011)
1. Bengali (98.2%)
2. Sadri (1.73%)
3. Hindi (0.03%)
4. Urdu (0.02%)
5. Others (0.01%)

At the time of the 2011 census, 98.21% of the population spoke Bengali, 1.73% Sadri, 0.03% Hindi and 0.02% Urdu as their first language.

=== Religion ===
Religion in Gosaba CD block (2011)
Hinduism	88.06%
Islam	8.63%
Christianity	1.30%
Other (tribal religion)	0.97%
Other or not stated	1.04%

In the 2011 Census of India, Hindus numbered 217,155 and formed 88.06% of the population in Gosaba CD block. Muslims numbered 21,286 and formed 8.63% of the population. Others numbered 8,157 and formed 3.31% of the population. Christians numbered 3,200. In 2001, Hindus were 90.03% of the population, while Muslims and Christians were 8.48% and 1.30% of the population respectively.

The proportion of Hindus in South Twenty-four Parganas district has declined from 76.0% in 1961 to 63.2% in 2011. The proportion of Muslims in South Twenty-four Parganas district has increased from 23.4% to 35.6% during the same period. Christians formed 0.8% in 2011.

== Rural poverty ==
As per the Human Development Report for South 24 Parganas district, published in 2009, in Gosaba CD block the percentage of households below poverty line was 38.03%. The poverty rates were very high in the Sundarbans settlements with all thirteen CD blocks registering poverty ratios above 30% and eight CD blocks had more than 40% of the population in the BPL category. The Sundarban region remains the most backward region in terms of quality of life. As per rural household survey in 2005, the proportion of households in South 24 Parganas with poverty rates below poverty line was 34.11%, way above the state and national poverty ratios.

== Economy ==
=== Livelihood ===
Livelihood
in Gosaba CD block
1. Cultivators (19.7%)
2. Agricultural labourers (54.2%)
3. Household industries (4.44%)
4. Other Workers (21.7%)

In Gosaba CD block in 2011, amongst the class of total workers, cultivators numbered 21,914 and formed 19.74%, agricultural labourers numbered 60,111 and formed 54.16%, household industry workers numbered 4,927 and formed 4.44% and other workers numbered 24,044 and formed 21.66%. Total workers numbered 110,996 and formed 45.01% of the total population, and non-workers numbered 135,602 and formed 54.99% of the population.

The District Human Development Report points out that in the blocks of region situated in the close proximity of the Kolkata metropolis, overwhelming majority are involved in the non-agricultural sector for their livelihood. On the other hand, in the Sundarban region, overwhelming majority are dependent on agriculture. In the intermediate region, there is again predominance of the non-agricultural sector. Though the region is not very close to Kolkata, many places are well connected and some industrial/ economic development has taken place.

Note: In the census records a person is considered a cultivator, if the person is engaged in cultivation/ supervision of land owned by self/government/institution. When a person who works on another person's land for wages in cash or kind or share, is regarded as an agricultural labourer. Household industry is defined as an industry conducted by one or more members of the family within the household or village, and one that does not qualify for registration as a factory under the Factories Act. Other workers are persons engaged in some economic activity other than cultivators, agricultural labourers and household workers. It includes factory, mining, plantation, transport and office workers, those engaged in business and commerce, teachers, entertainment artistes and so on.

=== Infrastructure ===
There are 50 inhabited villages in Gosaba CD block, as per District Census Handbook, South Twenty-four Parganas, 2011. 100% villages have power supply. 50 villages (100%) have drinking water supply. 34 villages (68.00%) have post offices. 42 villages (84.00%) have telephones (including landlines, public call offices and mobile phones). 8 villages (16.00%) have pucca (paved) approach roads and 35 villages (70.00%) have transport communication (includes bus service, rail facility and navigable waterways). 4 villages (8.00%) have agricultural credit societies and 12 villages (24.06%) have banks.

=== Agriculture ===
South 24 Parganas had played a significant role in the Tebhaga movement launched by the Communist Party of India in 1946. Subsequently, Operation Barga was aimed at securing tenancy rights for the peasants. In Gosaba CD block 13,608.84 acres of land was acquired and vested. Out of this 13,084.85 acres or 96.15% of the vested land was distributed among the peasants. The total number of patta (document) holders was 26,176.

According to the District Human Development Report, agriculture is an important source of livelihood in South Twentyfour Parganas district. The amount of cultivable land per agricultural worker is only 0.41 hectare in the district. Moreover, the irrigation facilities have not been extended to a satisfactory scale. Agriculture mostly remains a mono-cropped activity.

As per the District Census Handbook, the saline soil of the district is unfit for cultivation, but the non-salty lands are very fertile. While rice is the main food crop, jute is the main cash crop.

In 2013–14, there were 120 fertiliser depots, 28 seed stores and 50 fair price shops in Gosaba CD block.

In 2013–14, Gosaba CD block produced 113,260 tonnes of Aman paddy, the main winter crop, from 40,433 hectares, 19,475 tonnes of Boro paddy (spring crop) from 6,440 hectares, 2,663 tonnes of potatoes from 95 hectares. It also produced pulses and oilseeds.

=== Pisciculture ===
In Gosaba CD block, in 2013–14, net area under effective pisciculture was 3,208 hectares, engaging 64,740 persons in the profession, and with an approximate annual production of 107,740 quintals.

Pisciculture is an important source of employment in South 24 Parganas district. As of 2001, more than 4.5 lakh people were engaged in Pisciculture. Out of this 2.57 lakhs were from the 13 blocks in the Sundarbans.

=== Banking ===
In 2013–14, Gosaba CD block had offices of 2 commercial banks and 4 gramin banks.

=== Backward Regions Grant Fund ===
South 24 Parganas district is listed as a backward region and receives financial support from the Backward Regions Grant Fund. The fund, created by the Government of India, is designed to redress regional imbalances in development. As of 2012, 272 districts across the country were listed under this scheme. The list includes 11 districts of West Bengal.

== Transport ==
Gosaba CD block has 30 ferry services. The nearest railway station is 36 km from the block headquarters.

== Education ==
In 2013–14, Gosaba CD block had 162 primary schools with 15,942 students, 8 middle schools with 944 students, 19 high schools with 5,658 students and 18 higher secondary schools with 11,081 students. Gosaba CD block had 1 general degree college with 1,675 students and 493 institutions for special and non-formal education with 14,120 students.

See also – Education in India

As per the 2011 census, in Gosaba CD block, amongst the 50 inhabited villages, all villages had schools, 55 villages had two or more primary schools, 39 villages had at least 1 primary and 1 middle school and 33 villages had at least 1 middle and 1 secondary school.

Sundarban Hazi Desarat College was established at Pathankhali in 1961.

== Healthcare ==
In 2014, Gosaba CD block had 1 rural hospital, 2 primary health centre and 1 NGO/ private nursing home with total 71 beds and 7 doctors (excluding private bodies). It had 51 family welfare subcentres. 2,674 patients were treated indoor and 51,595 patients were treated outdoor in the hospitals, health centres and subcentres of the CD block.

As per 2011 census, in Gosaba CD block, 3 villages had primary health centres, 34 villages had primary health subcentres, 9 villages had maternity and child welfare centres, 1 village had a veterinary hospital, 19 villages had medicine shops and out of the 172 inhabited villages 2 villages had no medical facilities.

Gosaba Rural Hospital at Gosaba, with 30 beds, is the major government medical facility in Gosaba CD block. There are primary health centres at Chhota Mollakhali (with 10 beds) and Dakshin Radhanagar (PO Dhalarhat) (with 6 beds).
