= Sandesh =

Sandesh may refer to:

- Sandesha Kavya, Sanskrit genre of messenger poems
- Sandesha, a 1940 Indian film
- Sandesh (confectionery), a Bengali sweet prepared in Bangladesh and India
- Sandesh (magazine), a children's magazine in West Bengal
- Sandesh (Indian newspaper), a Gujarati newspaper
- Sandesh (Pakistani newspaper), a Sindhi language newspaper
- Sandesh Assembly constituency, Bihar
- Varun Sandesh (born 1989), Indian Telugu film actor

== See also ==
- Sandeshkhali (disambiguation)
- Sandesam, a 1991 Indian film
- Sandeśarāsaka, an epic poem from medieval India
