= 2024 Sandeshkhali violence =

Political violence in West Bengal, India, in 2024

- 2024 Sandeshkhali violence (West Bengal) 2024 Sandeshkhali violence (India)
- Location: 22°21′40″N 88°52′54″E; Sandeshkhali, North 24 Parganas, West Bengal, India
- Date: January 5, 2024; 09:30 (IST (UTC+05:30))

On 5 January 2024, a team of Enforcement Directorate officers visited the village of Sandeshkhali in West Bengal, India, to interrogate a local Trinamool Congress leader, Sheikh Shahjahan, about his involvement with the corruption scandal of the politician Jyotipriya Mallick. Mallick, a former minister with the Trinamool Congress, pled guilty for embezzling multiple crores from food rationing funds in October 2023, implicating Shahjahan. In January 2024, the ED investigated additional allegations of sexual assault and improper land acquisition against Shahjahan. In the resulting altercation, three ED officers were injured by local supporters of Shahjahan. Immediately after the incident, Shahjahan fled, remaining a fugitive for 55 days until his apprehension on 29 February. He was suspended by the Trinamool Congress immediately after his arrest.

== Background ==
On 5 January 2024, a group of ED officers went to interrogate Sheikh Shahjahan, a TMC district council member from Sarberia village of Sandeshkhali I CD block in North 24 Parganas district of West Bengal in connection with the ration smuggling case in which senior minister in Government of West Bengal, Jyotipriya Mallick was arrested in October 2023. Immediately after the raid, the ED officers were assaulted and attacked by the local villagers, along with destroying their phones, important files by the local supporters of Sheikh Shahjahan. The vehicles of the mediapersons which were present there, were also vandalized and they were beaten badly. Following that incident, on 11 January 2024, ED officers filed a petition for the protection of them in Calcutta High Court for which the protection was granted by the court. The court also ordered for an interim stay on the FIRs which were filed by police against ED officials on the day of the raid and violence. On 12 January 2024, two arrested in connection with the attack on the ED team by West Bengal Police. On 25 January 2024, ED again with full force of CISF went to Sandeshkhali to his residence for raid and they broke the doors and entered the house, but were able to find nothing. Following the attack incident, the local villagers alleged that Sheikh Shahjahan was like a gangster of Sandeshkhali, who used to threaten the people with his two aides, TMC leaders Shibu Hazra and Uttam Sardar and the mob. Allegations of systemic sexual assault on many women of Sandeshkhali surfaced in mainstream media during early February 2024. They also claimed that both Shibu and Uttam raped the women of the villages by calling them to their offices at ungodly hours and now police is denying to register FIRs.

On 17 February 2024, Shibu Hazra was arrested by the police. He was sent to 8 days of police custody by the court.

Soon after the news broke, several protests took place across the state by several opposition parties including the Bharatiya Janata Party and the Communist Party of India (Marxist). An inquiry was also launched on the allegations and several arrest were made.

On 29 February 2024, at around 5:30 am (IST), Shahjahan was arrested by the police from Minakhan, 30 km from Sandeshkhali by them.

== Reactions ==
Following the incident, BJP leader and the leader of opposition in West Bengal Legislative Assembly, Suvendu Adhikari condemned the attack on the ED in Sandeshkhali. He also alleged that West Bengal Police is helping Shahjahan to run away. However, TMC spokesperson Kunal Ghosh denied of such actions and said that Shahjahan is available in Sandeshkhali and had not flown anywhere. On the other hand, CPI(M) leader Mohammed Selim has also alleged that police had already talked with Shahjahan for his protection, that's why they are not taking any action against him. LoP Suvendu Adhikari when tried to visit Sandeshkhali with their MLAs, the police stopped and returned them to Kolkata in the prison van. On the same day, Adhikari filed a petition in the High Court to get the nod for visiting Sandeshkhali, for which he got the permission from the court.

On 15 February 2024, Chief Minister of West Bengal, Mamata Banerjee alleged that BJP and RSS are using both CBI and ED to create unnecessary violence to win over West Bengal in the upcoming Lok Sabha election in 2024.

On 14 February 2024, BJP State President and MP Sukanta Majumdar was detained by the police, during their sit-on protest in front of SP Office in Basirhat.

According to ANI, senior BJP leader and MP Dilip Ghosh alleged that Mamata Banerjee is involved in protecting such criminals like Shahjahan Sheikh.
