= Sandeshkhali I =

- Community development block
- Interactive map of Sandeshkhali I
- Coordinates: 22.454532°N 88.845834°E
- Country: India
- State: West Bengal
- District: North 24 Parganas

Government
  - Type: Representative democracy

Area
  - Total: 182.30 km^{2} (70.39 sq mi)
- Elevation: 7 m (23 ft)

Population (2011)
  - Total: 164,465
  - Density: 902.17/km^{2} (2,336.6/sq mi)

Languages
  - Official: Bengali, English

Literacy (2011)
  - Total literates: 100,978 (71.08%)
- Time zone: UTC+5:30 (IST)
- PIN: 743442 (Nazat)
- Telephone/STD code: 03217
- ISO 3166 code: IN-WB
- Vehicle registration: WB-23, WB-24, WB-25, WB-26
- Lok Sabha constituency: Basirhat
- Vidhan Sabha constituency: Sandeshkhali
- Website: north24parganas.nic.in

The Hungry Tide
In the beginning…there was nothing but forests here. There were no people, no embankments, no fields. Just kada and bada, mud and mangrove. At high tide most of the land vanished under water. And everywhere you looked there were predators – tigers, crocodiles, sharks, leopards…This was a time when people were so desperate for the land that they were willing to sell themselves for a bigha or two.

— Amitav Ghosh

Sandeshkhali I is a community development block that forms an administrative division in Basirhat subdivision of North 24 Parganas district in the Indian state of West Bengal.

== Geography ==
Nazat is located at 22.454532°N 88.845834°E

Sandeshkhali I CD Block is bounded by Minakhan and Hasnabad CD Blocks in the north, Hingalganj CD Block in the east, Sandeshkhali II CD Block in the south and Bhangar II and Bhangar I CD Blocks in South 24 Parganas district in the west.

Sandeshkhali I CD Block is part of the North Bidyadhari Plain, one of the three physiographic regions in the district located in the lower Ganges Delta. The area is full of marshes and salt water lakes. The Bidyadhari has a long course through the central part of the district. The wide Dalma and Besti rivers flow through the area.

Sandeshkhali I CD Block has an area of 182.30 km^{2}. It has 1 panchayat samity, 8 gram panchayats, 99 gram sansads (village councils), 30 mouzas and 30 inhabited villages. Nazat police station serves this block. Headquarters of this CD Block is at Nazat.

Gram panchayats of Sandeshkhali I block/ panchayat samiti are: Bayermari I, Bayermari II, Kalinagar, Sarberia Agarhati, Nazat I, Nazat II, Sehera Radhanagar and Hatgachhi.

=== Sundarbans ===
The Sundarbans is a flat lowland susceptible to storm surges along the 260 km shoreline of the Bay of Bengal. The total expanse of Sundarbans is about 2.05 million hectares (8,000 square miles). Of this, only 0.42 million hectares (1,629 square miles or 10,43,000 acres) are under the reserve forests including about 0.19 million hectares covered by creeks and channels. The area is prone to natural calamities such as cyclones, thunderstorms with occasional hail and floods. There are more than 63,400 km of embankments but the floods caused by high tidal bores, often wash away much of the embankments, already weakened and broken by earlier cyclonic storms.

In May 2009, the district was hit by high speed cyclone named Aila and subsequent rainfall which continued for two days. This created a disaster in 20 out of 22 blocks of the district. 10 out of 27 municipalities of the district were also severely affected.

Six CD Blocks of North 24 Parganas are included in the Sundabans area – Hingalganj, Hasnabad, Sandeskhali I and II, Minakhan and Haora. The south-eastern part of the district gradually merges into the Sunderbans.

== Demographics ==
=== Population ===
As per 2011 Census of India Sandeshkhali I CD Block had a total population of 164,465, all of which were rural. There were 83,925 (51%) males and 80,540 (49%) females. Population below 6 years was 22,394. Scheduled Castes numbered 50,812 (30.90%) and Scheduled Tribes numbered 42,674 (25.95%).

As per 2001 census, Sandeshkhali I block has a total population of 140,446 out of which 71,912 were males and 68,534 were females.

Large villages in Sandeshkhali I CD Block were (2011 census figures in brackets): Matbari (6,748), Khassankdaha (5,890), Chunchura (6,267), Laukhali Patharghata (9,180), Agarhati (6,889), Fakirtakia (10,361), Rajbari (5,964), Natkora (5,081), Kanmari (5,898), Khariat Abad (4,819), Baunia Abad (10,028), Nayazat (4,732), Bayar Mari Abad (11,030), Dakshin Akhratala (11,376), Ghoshpur (6,606), Kalinagar (8,769), Chhota Sehara (4,742) and Nityabaria (4,759).

North 24 Parganas district is densely populated, mainly because of the influx of refugees from East Pakistan (later Bangladesh). With a density of population of 2,182 per km^{2} in 1971, it was 3rd in terms of density per km^{2} in West Bengal after Kolkata and Howrah, and 20th in India. According to the District Human Development Report: North 24 Parganas, "High density is also explained partly by the rapid growth of urbanization in the district. In 1991, the percentage of urban population in the district has been 51.23."

Decadal Population Growth Rate (%) View chart definition.

The decadal growth of population in Sandeshkhali I CD Block in 2001-2011 was 17.08%. The decadal growth of population in Sandeshkhali I CD Block in 1991-2001 was 16.54%.

The decadal growth rate of population in North 24 Parganas district was as follows: 47.9% in 1951–61, 34.5% in 1961–71, 31.4% in 1971–81, 31.7% in 1981–91, 22.7% in 1991-2001 and 12.0% in 2001–11. The decadal growth rate for West Bengal in 2001-11 was 13.93%. The decadal growth rate for West Bengal was 17.84% in 1991–2001, 24.73% in 1981-1991 and 23.17% in 1971–1981.

Only a small portion of the border with Bangladesh has been fenced and it is popularly referred to as a porous border. It is freely used by Bangladeshi infiltrators, terrorists, smugglers, criminals et al.

=== Literacy ===
As per the 2011 census, the total number of literates in Sandeshkhali I CD Block was 100,978 (71.08% of the population over 6 years) out of which males numbered 56,501 (78.09% of the male population over 6 years) and females numbered 44,477 (63.80% of the female population over 6 years). The gender disparity (the difference between female and male literacy rates) was 14.29%.

See also – List of West Bengal districts ranked by literacy rate

Literacy in CD blocks of
North 24 Parganas district
Barasat Sadar subdivision
Amdanga – 80.69%
Deganga – 79.65%
Barasat I – 81.50%
Barasat II – 77.71%
Habra I – 83.15%
Habra II – 81.05%
Rajarhat – 83.13%
Basirhat subdivision
Baduria – 78.75%
Basirhat I – 72.10%
Basirhat II – 78.30%
Haroa – 73.13%
Hasnabad – 71.47%
Hingalganj – 76.85%
Minakhan – 71.33%
Sandeshkhali I – 71.08%
Sandeshkhali II – 70.96%
Swarupnagar – 77.57%
Bangaon subdivision
Bagdah – 75.30%
Bangaon – 79.71%
Gaighata – 82.32%
Barrackpore subdivision
Barrackpore I – 85.91%
Barrackpore II – 84.53%
Source: 2011 Census: CD Block Wise
Primary Census Abstract Data

=== Language and religion ===
Religion in Sandeshkhali I CD block (2011)
Hinduism	69.19%
Islam	30.42%
Other or not stated	0.39%

In the 2011 census Hindus numbered 113,793 and formed 69.19% of the population in Sandeshkhali I CD Block. Muslims numbered 50,029 and formed 30.42% of the population. Others numbered 643 and formed 0.39% of the population.

In 1981 Hindus numbered 76,282 and formed 81.23% of the population and Muslims numbered 17,574 and formed 18.50% of the population in Sandeshkhali I CD Block. In 1981 Hindus numbered 78,701 and formed 81.03% of the population and Muslims numbered 17,999 and formed 18.56% of the population in Sandeshkhali II CD Block. In 1991 Hindus numbered 187,572 and formed 78.34% of the population and Muslims numbered 51,862 and formed 21.66% of the population in Sandeshkhali I and Sandeshkhali II CD Blocks taken together. (In 1981 and 1991 census was conducted as per jurisdiction of the police station). In 2001, Hindus were 101,499 (72.25%) and Muslims 38,826 (27.64%).

Languages of Sandeshkhali I CD block (2011)
1. Bengali (97.6%)
2. Sadri (2.03%)
3. Others (0.33%)

At the time of the 2011 census, 97.64% of the population spoke Bengali and 2.03% Sadri as their first language.

== Rural Poverty ==
59.70% of households in Sandeshkhali I CD Block lived below poverty line in 2001, against an average of 29.28% in North 24 Parganas district.

== Crime ==
Sandeshkhali and its surrounding areas are known for "notorious activities and incidents of common people being attacked and robbed by pirates frequently". Some localities close to Sundarbans have been found vulnerable to women trafficking. More than 100 women from this region get trafficked to red-light areas in Mumbai and Pune each year.

Save The Children, a self-help group run by a non-governmental organisation has done yeomen service in the area.

Sandeshkhali I figured in the national political scenario during the 2024 Indian general election following the 2024 Sandeshkhali violence due to revelation of large scale sexual exploitation of local women by a Sheikh Shahjahan, a local district council leader from Sarberia operating a mafia empire & presiding over a reign of terror with an iron fist throughout Sandeshkhali I & Sandeshkhali II blocks, who went absconding (& was later arrested) after his goons attacked & violently assaulted officials of the Enforcement Directorate, who were on their way to interrogate him about his involvement in the West Bengal Public Distribution System scam. The Sandeshkhali incident made headlines in national news & was also mentioned by Prime Minister Narendra Modi while campaigning in the state. The Hindu-right wing BJP utilised the issue of Bengali Hindu women being sexually exploited by a Bengali Muslim strongman in a Bengali Hindu majority area like Sandeshkhali (which borders Bangladesh) for electoral propaganda against the ruling Trinamool Congress (the party to which Shahjahan belonged) and its leader, incumbent Chief Minister Mamata Banerjee (whose administration is alleged to indulge in Muslim appeasement for securing Muslim votebank during elections) & fielded Rekha Patra, the leader of the agitating women of Sandeshkhali who were sexually abused by Sheikh Shahjahan, as its candidate for the Bashirhat seat for the polls.

== Economy ==
=== Livelihood ===
Livelihood
in Sandeshkhali I CD Block
1. Cultivators (13.9%)
2. Agricultural labourers (45.6%)
3. Household industries (3.92%)
4. Other Workers (36.5%)

In Sandeshkhali I CD Block in 2011, amongst the class of total workers, cultivators numbered 8,503 and formed 13.94% of the total workers, agricultural labourers numbered 27,851 and formed 45.65%, household industry workers numbered 2,392 and formed 3.92% and other workers numbered 22,259 and formed 36.49%. Total workers numbered 61,005 and formed 37.09% of the total population, and non-workers numbered 103,460 and formed 62.91% of the population.

In more than 30 percent of the villages in North 24 Parganas, agriculture or household industry is no longer the major source of livelihood for the main workers there. The CD Blocks in the district can be classified as belonging to three categories: border areas, Sundarbans area and other rural areas. The percentage of other workers in the other rural areas category is considerably higher than those in the border areas and Sundarbans area.

Note: In the census records a person is considered a cultivator, if the person is engaged in cultivation/ supervision of land owned by self/government/institution. When a person who works on another person's land for wages in cash or kind or share, is regarded as an agricultural labourer. Household industry is defined as an industry conducted by one or more members of the family within the household or village, and one that does not qualify for registration as a factory under the Factories Act. Other workers are persons engaged in some economic activity other than cultivators, agricultural labourers and household workers. It includes factory, mining, plantation, transport and office workers, those engaged in business and commerce, teachers, entertainment artistes and so on.

=== Infrastructure ===
There are 30 inhabited villages in Sandeshkhali I CD Block. 100% villages have power supply and drinking water supply. 17 villages (56.67%) have post offices. 24 villages (80.00%) have telephones (including landlines, public call offices and mobile phones). 18 villages (60.00%) have a pucca approach road and 18 villages (60.00%) have transport communication (includes bus service, rail facility and navigable waterways). 1 village (3.33%) has an agricultural credit society and 5 villages (16.67% ) have banks.

=== Power ===
The remote villages and hamlets situated in the area suffer from chronic shortage of energy due to non-availability of grid power. It is extremely difficult to extend high voltage transmission lines because of technical limitations in an area with inhospitable terrain and prohibitive cost. A scheme is being formulated to cover about 750,000 people in the difficult areas of Sundarbans with non-conventional energy power within the year 2012. The scheme covers Gosaba, Sagar, Pathar Pratima, Namkhana, Kultali, Hingalganj and Sandeshkhali.

=== Agriculture ===
The North 24 Parganas district Human Development Report opines that in spite of agricultural productivity in North 24 Parganas district being rather impressive 81.84% of rural population suffered from shortage of food. With a high urbanisation of 54.3% in 2001, the land use pattern in the district is changing quite fast and the area under cultivation is declining. However, agriculture is still the major source of livelihood in the rural areas of the district.

From 1977 on wards major land reforms took place in West Bengal. Land in excess of land ceiling was acquired and distributed amongst the peasants. Following land reforms land ownership pattern has undergone transformation. In 2010–11, persons engaged in agriculture in Sandeshkhali I CD Block could be classified as follows: bargadars 7,654 (11.80%), patta (document) holders 13,843 (21.35%), small farmers (possessing land between 1 and 2 hectares) 2,730 (4.21%), marginal farmers (possessing land up to 1 hectare) 21,430 (33.05%) and agricultural labourers 19,181 (29.58%).

Sandeshkhali I CD Block had 15 fertiliser depots, 9 seed stores and 40 fair price shops in 2010–11.

In 2010–11, Sandeshkhali I CD Block produced 1,412 tonnes of Aman paddy, the main winter crop from 834 hectares.

There were no irrigation facilities in Sandeshkhali I CD Block in 2010–11.

=== Pisciculture ===
In 2010–11, the net area under effective pisciculture in Sandeshkhali I CD Block was 5,730.18 hectares. 11,413 persons were engaged in the profession. Approximate annual production was 171,905.4 quintals.

=== Banking ===
In 2010–11, Sandeshkhali I CD Block had offices of 4 commercial banks and 1 gramin bank.

=== Micro-credit ===
Micro credit is serving as an effective tool of economic emancipation of women, empowering them to fight against many social evils and the age-old atrocities in the villages. JYDC an NGO, in collaboration with National Bank for Agriculture and Rural Development (NABARD) has established 1047 self-help groups with 12000 members spread over 24 villages (mouza). SHG members of Sandeshkhali raised Rs.40,000/-loan from Bank of Baroda to start a poultry farm.(31 March 2008, BDO, SDK-II)

== Transport ==
In 2010–11, Sandeshkhali I CD Block had 10 ferry services and 4 originating/ terminating bus routes. The nearest railway station is 27 km from CD Block headquarters.

Sandeshkhali Area nearest railway station is Canning Railway Station (CG) distance from Sandeshkhali 14 km via Dhamakhali, Sorberia and Matla Bridge.

SH 3 passes through this CD Block.

== Education ==
In 2010–11, Sandeshkhali I CD Block had 87 primary schools with 12,272 students, 2 middle schools with 516 students, 6 high schools with 3,652 students and 6 higher secondary schools with 5,440 students. Sandeshkhali I CD Block had 1 general college with 1,273 students and 409 institutions for special and non-formal education with 16,616 students.

Kalinagar Mahavidyalaya was established at Kalinagar, PS Sandeshkhali, in 1985.

As per the 2011 census, in Sandeshkhali I CD Block, amongst the 30 inhabited villages, all villages had a school, 26 villages had more than 1 primary school, 18 villages had at least 1 primary and 1 middle school and 14 villages had at least 1 middle and 1 secondary school.

== Healthcare ==
In 2011, Sandeshkhali I CD Block had 1 block primary health centre and 2 primary health centres, with total 23 beds and 4 doctors (excluding private bodies). It had 35 family welfare subcentres. 1,668 patients were treated indoor and 83,016 patients were treated outdoor in the hospitals, health centres and subcentres of the CD Block.

Ghoshpur Rural Hospital at Ghoshpur with 30 beds functions as the main medical facility in Sandeshkhali I CD Block. There are primary health centres at Agarbati (Hatgachia PHC with 10 beds) and Nazat (with 6 beds).

Although in North 24 Parganas district groundwater is affected by arsenic contamination, tubewells in Sandeshkhali II block are arsenic safe according to Indian standard (50 μg/L) and in Sandeshkhali I block only 0.6% tubewells exceed 50 μg/L.(study conducted by JYDC an NGO). A lab was set up by JYDC in collaboration with UNICEF and government of West Bengal to monitor drinking water in the area. The probable reason may be, in Sandeshkhali, most of the tubewells are deep tubewells. A study of iodine deficiency disorder amongst children found that prevalence of goitre amongst school children was very high at Sandeshkhali.

Four launches with doctors carrying medicines, portable X-ray and echo-cardiograph machines, provided by the French author Dominique Lapierre move along the waterways of the Sundarbans to its furthest corners, associated with the NGO Southern Health Improvement Samity (SHIS)
