= Nazat =

Nazat Nyazat
- Village
- Location in West Bengal, India Nazat (India)
- Coordinates: 22.443651°N 88.842423°E
- Country: India
- State: West Bengal
- District: North 24 Parganas

Population (2011)
  - Total: 4,732

Languages
  - Official: Bengali, English
- Time zone: UTC+5:30 (IST)
- PIN: 743439
- Telephone/STD code: 03217
- Lok Sabha constituency: Basirhat
- Vidhan Sabha constituency: Sandeshkhali
- Website: north24parganas.nic.in

Nazat (also known as Nyazat) is a village and a gram panchayat in the Sandeshkhali I CD block in the Basirhat subdivision of the North 24 Parganas district in the state of West Bengal, India.

== Geography ==
Cities, towns and locations in Basirhat subdivision, North 24 Parganas district
M: municipal town, CT: census town, R: rural/ urban centre
Owing to space constraints in the small map, the actual locations in a larger map may vary slightly

=== Location ===
Nazat is located near the confluence of the Bidyadhari and the Besti.

=== Area overview ===
The area shown in the map is a part of the Ichhamati-Raimangal Plain, located in the lower Ganges Delta. It contains soil of mature black or brownish loam to recent alluvium. Numerous rivers, creeks and khals criss-cross the area. The tip of the Sundarbans National Park is visible in the lower part of the map (shown in green but not marked). The larger full screen map shows the full forest area. A large section of the area is a part of the Sundarbans settlements. The densely populated area is an overwhelmingly rural area. Only 12.96% of the population lives in the urban areas and 87.04% of the population lives in the rural areas.

Note: The map alongside presents some of the notable locations in the subdivision. All places marked in the map are linked in the larger full screen map.

== Civic administration ==
=== Police station ===
Nazat police station has jurisdiction over Sandeshkhali I CD block.

=== CD block HQ ===
The headquarters of Sandeshkhali I CD block are located at Nazat.

== Demographics ==
According to the 2011 Census of India, Nyazat had a total population of 4,732, of which 2,412 (51%) were males and 2,320 (49%) were females. Population in the age range 0–6 years was 544. The total number of literate persons in Nyazat was 3,036 (72.49% of the population over 6 years).

== Economy ==
Nazat hat (market) is spread over 1 acre of land and sits on Mondays and Fridays.

== Transport ==
The Nazat-Basirhat Road links Nazat to State Highway 2 at Bhebia Chowmatha Murarishah.

On crossing the Besti River from Nazat Kheya Ghat one can easily approach the 30-bedded Ghoshpur Rural Hospital and Kalinagar Mahavidyalaya.

== Healthcare ==
Nazat has a primary health centres with 6 beds.
