= Gosaba Assembly constituency =

Legislative Assembly constituency in West Bengal, India

Gosaba
- Constituency No. 127 for the West Bengal Legislative Assembly
- Interactive Map Outlining Gosaba Assembly Constituency

Constituency details
- Country: India
- Region: East India
- State: West Bengal
- District: South 24 Parganas
- Lok Sabha constituency: Jaynagar
- Established: 1967
- Total electors: 230,230
- Reservation: SC

Member of Legislative Assembly
- 18th West Bengal Legislative Assembly
- Incumbent Bikarna Naskar
- Party: BJP
- Alliance: NDA
- Elected year: 2026

Gosaba Assembly constituency is a Legislative Assembly constituency of South 24 Parganas district in the Indian State of West Bengal. It is reserved for Scheduled Castes.

== Overview ==
As per order of the Delimitation Commission in respect of the Delimitation of constituencies in the West Bengal, Gosaba Assembly constituency is composed of the following:

- Gosaba community development block
- Chunakhali and Maszidbati gram panchayats of Basanti community development block

Gosaba Assembly constituency is a part of No. 19 Jaynagar Lok Sabha constituency.

== Members of the Legislative Assembly ==
Year	Name	Party
1967	G.N. Mondal	Bharatiya Jana Sangh
1969	Ganesh Chandra Mondal	Revolutionary Socialist Party
1971	Ganesh Chandra Mondal	Revolutionary Socialist Party
1972	Paresh Chandra Baidya	Indian National Congress
1977	Ganesh Chandra Mondal	Revolutionary Socialist Party
1982	Ganesh Chandra Mondal	Revolutionary Socialist Party
1987	Ganesh Chandra Mondal	Revolutionary Socialist Party
1991	Ganesh Chandra Mondal	Revolutionary Socialist Party
1996	Ganesh Chandra Mondal	Revolutionary Socialist Party
2001	Ganesh Chandra Mondal	Revolutionary Socialist Party
2006	Chittaranjan Mondal	Revolutionary Socialist Party
2011	Jayanta Naskar	Trinamool Congress
2016	Jayanta Naskar	Trinamool Congress
2021	Jayanta Naskar	Trinamool Congress
2021^	Subrata Mondal	Trinamool Congress
2026	Bikarna Naskar	Bharatiya Janata Party

- ^ denotes by-election.

== Election results ==
Vote share of Winning candidates
2026	51.34%
2021 (by-poll)	87.19%
2021	53.99%
2016	50.52%
2011	51.00%
2006	48.69%
2001	51.93%
1996	51.48%
1991	53.08%
1987	54.16%
1982	56.39%
1977	48.20%
1972	53.05%
1971	43.74%
1969	60.08%
1967	38.70%

=== 2026 ===
2026 West Bengal Legislative Assembly election: Gosaba
Party	Candidate	Votes	%	±%
BJP	Bikarna Naskar	108,492	51.34	▲41.39
AITC	Subrata Mondal	92,392	43.72	▼43.47
RSP	Adwaitya Jotdar	4,221	2.0	▲0.34
NOTA	None of the above	2,221	1.05	▲0.53
Majority		16,100	7.62	▼4.49
Turnout		211,328	95.44	▲10.43
BJP gain from AITC		Swing		

=== 2021 by-election ===
West Bengal Legislative Assembly by-election 2021: Gosaba
Party	Candidate	Votes	%	±%
AITC	Subrata Mondal	161,474	87.19	▲33.20
BJP	Palash Rana	18,423	9.95	▼32.93
RSP	Anil Chandra Mondal	3,078	1.66	▼0.83
Independent	Tutun Mondal	1,262	0.68	New entry
NOTA	None of the above	971	0.52	Steady
Majority		1,43,051	75.24	▲63.18
Turnout		1,85,435	80.58	▼4.43
AITC hold		Swing		

=== 2021 ===
2021 West Bengal Legislative Assembly election: Gosaba
Party	Candidate	Votes	%	±%
AITC	Jayanta Naskar	105,723	53.99	▲3.47
BJP	Barun Pramanik	82,014	41.88	▲36.47
RSP	Anil Chandra Mondal	4,871	2.49	▼37.07
NOTA	None of the above	1,017	0.52	
Majority		23,709	12.11	
Turnout		195,808	85.01	
AITC hold		Swing		

=== 2016 ===
2016 West Bengal Legislative Assembly election: Gosaba
Party	Candidate	Votes	%	±%
AITC	Jayanta Naskar	90,716	50.52	▼0.48
RSP	Uttam Kumar Saha	71,045	39.56	▼4.53
BJP	Sanjoy Kumar Nayek	11,504	6.41	▲3.77
NOTA	None of the above	3,109	1.73	New entry
SUCI(C)	Dilip Mondal	1,050	0.58	New entry
LJP	Dinabandhu Mondal	977	0.54	New entry
BSP	Haripada Mondal	776	0.43	▼0.48
MPOI	Tushar Kanti Mondal	401	0.22	New entry
Majority		19,671	10.96	▲4.05
Turnout		1,80,001	84.75	▼0.77
AITC hold		Swing		

=== 2011 ===
2011 West Bengal Legislative Assembly election: Gosaba
Party	Candidate	Votes	%	±%
AITC	Jayanta Naskar	78,840	51.00	
RSP	Samarendra Nath Mondal	68,158	44.09	
BJP	Sukumar Mondal	4,074	2.64	
PDS	Mukunda Kumar Das	2,112	1.37	
BSP	Rathin Sarkar	1,402	0.91	
Majority		10,682	6.91	
Turnout		1,54,586	85.52	
AITC gain from RSP		Swing		

=== 2006 ===
2006 West Bengal Legislative Assembly election: Gosaba (SC)
Party	Candidate	Votes	%	±%
RSP	Chitta Ranjan Mandal	57,594	48.69	
AITC	Jayanta Naskar	51,110	43.21	
INC	Kiriti Mondal	3,457	2.92	
IND	Nirmal Sarkar	3,139	2.65	
BSP	Hari Pada Mandal	1,628	1.38	
IND	Tarango Mondal	1,360	1.15	
Majority		6,484	5.48	
Turnout		118,288		
RSP hold		Swing		

=== 2001 ===
2001 West Bengal Legislative Assembly election: Gosaba (SC)
Party	Candidate	Votes	%	±%
RSP	Ganesh Mondal	55,333	51.93	
AITC	Sujit Pramanik	40,161	37.69	
BJP	Satish Mallik	6,925	6.50	
IND	Nirmal Sarkar	1,923	1.80	
BSP	Haripada Mandal	1,199	1.13	
PDS	Srimanta Ray	1,021	0.96	
Majority		15,172	14.24	
Turnout		106,562	74.47	
RSP hold		Swing		

=== 1996 ===
1996 West Bengal Legislative Assembly election: Gosaba (SC)
Party	Candidate	Votes	%	±%
RSP	Ganesh Mondal	54,312	51.48	
INC	Sujit Pramanik	43,526	41.26	
BJP	Sukumar Mondal	5,044	4.78	
IND	Nirmal Sarkar	2,275	2.16	
IND	Prosad Mondal	342	0.32	
Majority		10,786	10.22	
Turnout		108,472	83.77	
RSP hold		Swing		

=== 1991 ===
1991 West Bengal Legislative Assembly election: Gosaba (SC)
Party	Candidate	Votes	%	±%
RSP	Ganesh Chandra Moindal	49,384	53.08	
INC	Jitendra Nath Gayen	34,530	37.11	
BJP	Sukumar Mondal	7,362	7.91	
IND	Nirmal Sarkar	1,768	1.90	
Majority		14,854	15.97	
Turnout		94,938	79.96	
RSP hold		Swing		

=== 1987 ===
1987 West Bengal Legislative Assembly election: Gosaba (SC)
Party	Candidate	Votes	%	±%
RSP	Ganesh Chandra Mondal	42,111	54.16	
INC	Pramila Biswas	33,052	42.51	
SUCI(C)	Tapas Sarkar	2,030	2.61	
IND	Mahadev Roy Mondal	553	0.71	
Majority		9,059	11.65	
Turnout		78,985	80.94	
RSP hold		Swing		

=== 1982 ===
1982 West Bengal Legislative Assembly election: Gosaba (SC)
Party	Candidate	Votes	%	±%
RSP	Ganesh Mondal	42,066	56.39	
INC	Sandhyakar Mondal	32,200	43.17	
IND	Sudhir Kumar Mondal	328	0.44	
Majority		9,866	13.22	
Turnout		75,789	85.60	
RSP hold		Swing		

=== 1977 ===
1977 West Bengal Legislative Assembly election: Gosaba (SC)
Party	Candidate	Votes	%	±%
RSP	Ganesh Chandra Mondal	24,300	48.20	
INC	Paresh Baidya	16,530	32.79	
JP	Ashit Ranjan Mridha	9,285	18.42	
IND	Durgapada Sanpui	300	0.60	
Majority		7,770	15.41	
Turnout		51,166	62.57	
Swing to RSP from INC		Swing		

=== 1972 ===
1972 West Bengal Legislative Assembly election: Gosaba (SC)
Party	Candidate	Votes	%	±%
INC	Paresh Baidya	26,867	53.05	
RSP	Ganesh Mondal	21,888	43.22	
RPI	Tarang Mondal	1,308	2.58	
INC(O)	Girindra Nath Mondal	578	1.14	
Majority		4,979	9.83	
Turnout		51,769	68.47	
Swing to INC from RSP		Swing		

=== 1971 ===
1971 West Bengal Legislative Assembly election: Gosaba (SC)
Party	Candidate	Votes	%	±%
RSP	Ganesh Chandra Mondal	23,571	43.74	
INC	Paresh Chandra Baidya	22,663	42.06	
CPI(M)	Kalipataru Barman	5,482	10.17	
BBC	Kamalapada Mondal	653	1.21	
BAC	Krishna Pada Mali	584	1.08	
SUCI(C)	Raman Nath Patro	584	1.08	
IND	Chandra Kanta Sarkar	346	0.64	
Majority		908	1.68	
Turnout		55,369	75.14	
RSP hold		Swing		

=== 1969 ===
1969 West Bengal Legislative Assembly election: Gosaba (SC)
Party	Candidate	Votes	%	±%
RSP	Ganesh Chandra Mondal	29,528	60.08	
INC	Hazari Mondal	18,941	38.54	
IND	Chandra Kanta Sarkar	678	1.38	
Majority		10,587	21.54	
Turnout		50,285	73.73	
Swing to RSP from ABJS		Swing		

=== 1967 ===
1967 West Bengal Legislative Assembly election: Gosaba (SC)
Party	Candidate	Votes	%	±%
ABJS	G. N. Mandal	17,620	38.70	
IND	H. C. Mandal	16,564	36.38	
INC	A. K. Baidya	11,350	24.93	
Majority		1,056	2.32	
Turnout		49,326	73.97	
ABJS win (new seat)				
