= Hingalganj, North 24 Parganas =

Hingalganj
- Census Town
- Location in West Bengal, India Hingalganj (India)
- Coordinates: 22.470803°N 88.983346°E
- Country: India
- State: West Bengal
- District: North 24 Parganas

Population (2011)
  - Total: 8,179

Languages
  - Official: Bengali, English
- Time zone: UTC+5:30 (IST)
- PIN: 743435 (Hingalganj)
- Telephone/STD code: 03217
- Lok Sabha constituency: Basirhat
- Vidhan Sabha constituency: Hingalganj
- Website: north24parganas.nic.in

Hingalganj is a census town in the Hingalganj CD block in the Basirhat subdivision of the North 24 Parganas district in the state of West Bengal, India.

== Etymology ==
The name Hingalganj came after the name of Tillman Henkel, district judge and magistrate in Jessore district from 1781. He developed the settlement there.

== Geography ==
Cities, towns and locations in Basirhat subdivision, North 24 Parganas district
M: municipal town, CT: census town, R: rural/ urban centre
Owing to space constraints in the small map, the actual locations in a larger map may vary slightly

=== Location ===
Hingalganj is located at 22.470803°N 88.983346°E.

The Ichhamati, the second most important river in the district after the Hooghly "flows south easterly meandering course over C.D. Blocks like Bagda, Bongaon and Basirhat-I and Basirhat-II and thus forms the international boundary with Bangladesh." It finally meets the Raimangal further south.

=== Area overview ===
The area shown in the map is a part of the Ichhamati-Raimangal Plain, located in the lower Ganges Delta. It contains soil of mature black or brownish loam to recent alluvium. Numerous rivers, creeks and khals criss-cross the area. The tip of the Sundarbans National Park is visible in the lower part of the map (shown in green but not marked). The larger full screen map shows the full forest area. A large section of the area is a part of the Sundarbans settlements. The densely populated area is an overwhelmingly rural area. Only 12.96% of the population lives in the urban areas and 87.04% of the population lives in the rural areas.

Note: The map alongside presents some of the notable locations in the subdivision. All places marked in the map are linked in the larger full screen map.

== Civic administration ==
=== Police station ===
Hingalganj police station serves a population of 112,941. It has jurisdiction over Hingalganj CD block.

=== CD block HQ ===
The headquarters of Hingalganj CD block are located at Hingalganj.

== Demographics ==
According to the 2011 Census of India, Hingalganj town had a total population of 8,179, of which 4,129 (50%) were males and 4,050 (50%) were females. Population in the age range 0–6 years was 812. The total number of literate persons in Hingalganj was 5,503 (74.70% of the population over 6 years).

Hingalganj

... Hingalganj, a block headquarters some 100 km from Calcutta. A ribbon-like road threads through the tree-clad villages on this island in the Sunderbans delta, empty of traffic except for an occasional motorcycle-driven cart laden with passengers, the lone local transport. At midday, the only sound you hear is the chirping of invisible crickets. Hingalganj, clearly, looks idyllic.

Suddenly, an armed Border Security Force squad emerges from a roadside bamboo grove. Further on, near what looks like a village square, another group of border guards marches by, fingers on the triggers of the guns hanging from their shoulders. In front of the local police station, a constable stands guard with an automatic rifle, an unusual sight in a rural police station in West Bengal.

But then, Hingalganj is not just another rural town in Bengal. Perched on India's border with Bangladesh, Hingalganj, in North 24 Parganas district, is now a gateway to terror, a place the security forces and intelligence agents are keeping a sharp eye on.

- The Telegraph, 3 September 2006

== Transport ==
This is what a two-wheeler rider wrote after a visit to the area in 2014: "Hasnabad is a border town (with Bangladesh) and also the last significant town in the area. Vigil is very high. Any one travelling to that area is advised to have at least one photo ID proof so that could be showed to the BSF. After crossing the Ichhamati River, it’s a 15 odd km ride to Hingalganj – a small sleepy place of around 5 sq km. Road is not wide but save 1 km, is a pleasure to ride."

The 684 m long bridge across the Katakhali at Hasnabad was opened to public in March 2019, linking Hingalganj with Hasnabad. Lebukhali, the last point up to which motorised transport can reach is now directly connected to Kolkata and other places.

== Education ==
Hingalganj Mahavidyalaya was established at Hingalganj in 2005. It is a co-educational institution affiliated with the West Bengal State University and offers honours courses in Bengali, English, Sanskrit, geography and education, and a general course in arts.

Hingalganj High School is a Bengali-medium co-educational school. It was established in 1948. It has arrangements for teaching from Class VI to XII.

== Healthcare ==
Hingalganj has a primary health centre with 6 beds.
