= Sandeshkhali =

- Village
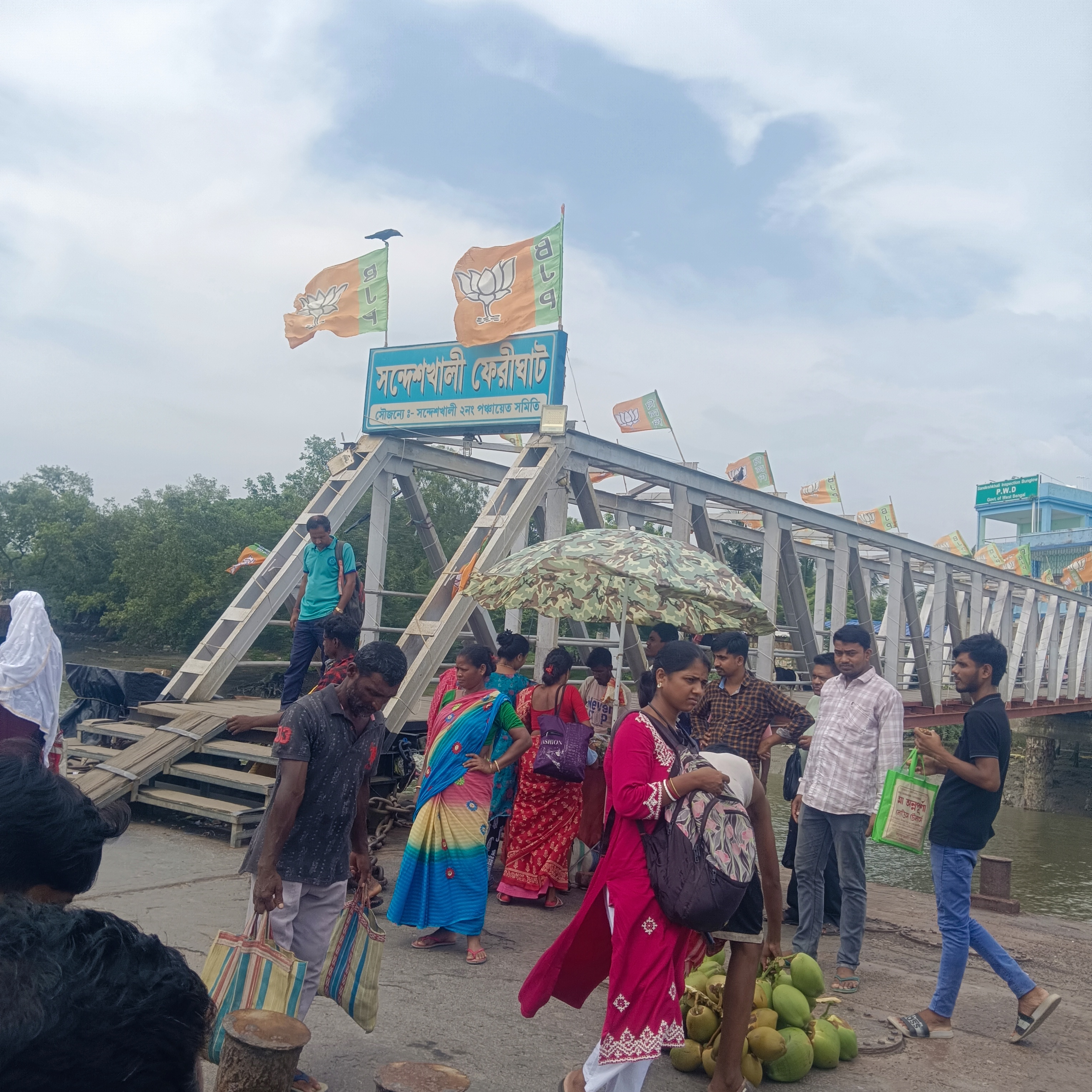
- Sandeshkhali Ferry Ghat

- Location in West Bengal, India Sandeshkhali (India)
- Coordinates: 22.366465°N 88.876436°E
- Country: India
- State: West Bengal
- District: North 24 Parganas

Languages
  - Official: Bengali, English
- Time zone: UTC+5:30 (IST)
- PIN: 743446 (Sandeshkhali)
- Telephone/STD code: 03218
- Lok Sabha constituency: Basirhat
- Vidhan Sabha constituency: Sandeshkhali
- Website: north24parganas.nic.in

Sandeshkhali is a village in the Sandeshkhali II CD block in the Basirhat subdivision of the North 24 Parganas district in the state of West Bengal, India.

== Geography ==
Cities, towns and locations in Basirhat subdivision, North 24 Parganas district
M: municipal town, CT: census town, R: rural/ urban centre
Owing to space constraints in the small map, the actual locations in a larger map may vary slightly

=== Location ===
Sandeshkhali is located at 22.366465°N 88.876436°E.

=== Area overview ===
The area shown in the map is a part of the Ichhamati-Raimangal Plain, located in the lower Ganges Delta. It contains soil of mature black or brownish loam to recent alluvium. Numerous rivers, creeks and khals criss-cross the area. The tip of the Sundarbans National Park is visible in the lower part of the map (shown in green but not marked). The larger full screen map shows the full forest area. A large section of the area is a part of the Sundarbans settlements. The densely populated area is an overwhelmingly rural area. Only 12.96% of the population lives in the urban areas and 87.04% of the population lives in the rural areas.

Note: The map alongside presents some of the notable locations in the subdivision. All places marked in the map are linked in the larger full screen map.

== Civic administration ==
=== Police station ===
Sandeshkhali police station serves a population of 328,989. It has jurisdiction over Sandeshkhali II CD block. There is an out-post at Rajbari.

=== CD block HQ ===
The headquarters of Sandeshkhali II CD block are located at Dwarir Jangle.

== Demographics ==
In the map of Sandeshkhali II CD Block in the District Census Handbook, Sandeshkhali is shown as being part of Village No. 884 Dwarir Jangle.

According to the 2011 Census of India, Dwarir Jangle had a total population of 11,155, of which 5,760 (52%) were males and 5,395 (48%) were females. Population in the age range 0–6 years was 1,321. The total number of literate persons in Dwarir Jangle was 6,857 (69.73% of the population over 6 years).

== Transport ==
The Kalindi river flows past Sandeshkhali and there is a ferry service from Sandeshkhali to Bhangatushkhali.

Sandeshkhali nearest railway station is Canning Railway Station (CG). It is about 34 km away from Sandeshkhali, via Dhamakhali, Sorberia and Matla Bridge.

== Education ==
Sandeshkhali Radharani High School is a co-educational higher secondary school. Rajbari Agarhati Gourhari vidyapith is a co-educational higher secondary school.

== Healthcare ==
Sandeshkhali Rural Hospital with 25 beds located at Sandeshkhali is the main medical facility in Sandeshkhali II CD Block. There are primary health centres at Korakanthi and Jeliakhli.
