= Sandeshkhali Assembly constituency =

Sandeshkhali
- Constituency No. 123 for the West Bengal Legislative Assembly
- Interactive Map Outlining Sandeshkhali Assembly Constituency

Constituency details
- Country: India
- Region: East India
- State: West Bengal
- District: North 24 Parganas
- Lok Sabha constituency: Basirhat
- Established: 1951
- Total electors: 172,352
- Reservation: ST

Member of Legislative Assembly
- 18th West Bengal Legislative Assembly
- Incumbent Sanat Sardar
- Party: Bharatiya Janata Party
- Elected year: 2026

Sandeshkhali is an assembly constituency in North 24 Parganas district in the Indian state of West Bengal. It is reserved for scheduled tribes.

== Overview ==
As per orders of the Delimitation Commission, 123 Sandeshkhali Assembly constituency (ST) is composed of the following: Sandeshkhali I community development block, and Beramajur I, Beramajur II, Durgamandap, Jeliakhali, Korakati, Manipur and Sandeshkhali gram panchayats of Sandeshkhali II community development block.

Sandeshkhali Assembly constituency (ST) is part of 18. Basirhat (Lok Sabha constituency). It was earlier part of Jaynagar (Lok Sabha constituency).

== Members of the Legislative Assembly ==
Year	Name	Party
1951	Jyotish Chandra Roy Sardar	Indian National Congress
1951	Hemanta Kumar Ghoshal	Communist Party of India
1957	Haran Chandra Mondal	Independent politician
1962	Ananta Kumar Baidya	Indian National Congress
1967	Debendra Nath Sinha	Indian National Congress
1969	Sarat Sarder	Communist Party of India (Marxist)
1971	Sarat Sarder	Communist Party of India (Marxist)
1972	Debendra Nath Sinha	Indian National Congress
1977	Kumud Ranjan Biswas	Communist Party of India (Marxist)
1982	Kumud Ranjan Biswas	Communist Party of India (Marxist)
1987	Kumud Ranjan Biswas	Communist Party of India (Marxist)
1991	Dhiren Mondal	Communist Party of India (Marxist)
1996	Kanti Biswas	Communist Party of India (Marxist)
2001	Kanti Biswas	Communist Party of India (Marxist)
2006	Abani Roy	Communist Party of India (Marxist)
2011	Nirapada Sardar	Communist Party of India (Marxist)
2016	Sukumar Mahata	Trinamool Congress
2021	Sukumar Mahata	Trinamool Congress
2026	Sanat Sardar	Bhartiya Janata Party

== Election results ==
Vote share of winning candidates
2026	49.58%
2021	54.64%
2016	51.49%
2011	43.21%
2006	53.97%
2001	54.53%

=== 2026 ===
2026 West Bengal Legislative Assembly election: Sandeshkhali
Party	Candidate	Votes	%	±%
BJP	Sanat Sardar	107,189	49.58	+14.22
AITC	Jharna Sardar	89,679	41.48	−13.16
CPI(M)	Rabindra Nath Mahato	12,921	5.98	
NOTA	None of the above	2,192	1.01	−0.18
Majority		17,510	8.1	−11.18
Turnout		216,180	96.8	+10.56
BJP gain from AITC		Swing		

=== 2021 ===
2021 West Bengal Legislative Assembly election: Sandeshkhali
Party	Candidate	Votes	%	±%
AITC	Sukumar Mahata	112,450	54.64	
BJP	Bhaskar Sardar	72,765	35.36	+22.65
ISF	Barun Mahato	14,387	6.99	
Independent	Harish Chandra Sardar	1,961	0.95	
NOTA	None of the above	2,456	1.19	
Majority		39,685	19.28	
Turnout		205,787	86.24	
AITC hold		Swing		

=== 2016 ===
West Bengal assembly elections, 2016: Sandeshkhali (ST) constituency
Party	Candidate	Votes	%	±%
AITC	Sukumar Mahata	96,566	51.49	+11.02
CPI(M)	Nirapada Sardar	58,366	31.13	−12.08
BJP	Sukumar Sardar	23,841	12.71	+1.44
NOTA	None of the above	2,952	1.57	
AMB	Manib Sardar	1,890	1.01	
BSP	Ramkrishna Munda (Sardar)	1,686	0.90	
SUCI(C)	Krishna Pada Munda	1,218	0.65	
Independent	Harish Chandra Sardar	1,010	0.54	
Turnout		187,519	87.14	−2.58
AITC gain from CPI(M)		Swing		

=== 2011 ===
West Bengal assembly elections, 2011: Sandeshkhali (ST) constituency
Party	Candidate	Votes	%	±%
CPI(M)	Nirapada Sardar	66,815	43.21	−10.76
AITC	Padma Mahato	62,583	40.47	+0.44#
BJP	Sukumar Sardar	17,425	11.27	
Independent	Harish Chandra Sardar	2,745		
JMM	Anita Sardar	1,979		
Independent	Madhusudan Mahata	1,267		
People’s Democratic Conference of India	Swapan Kumar Sardar	1,253		
Independent	Nirendra Nath Sardar	566		
Turnout		154,633	89.72	
CPI(M) hold		Swing	-11.20#	

=== 2006 ===
2006 West Bengal Legislative Assembly election: Sandeshkhali
Party	Candidate	Votes	%	±%
CPI(M)	Abani Roy	69,859	53.97	Winner
AITC	Gita Mondal	49,867	38.52	
INC	Subrata Sana	9,719	7.51	
Majority		19,992	15.45	
Turnout		1,29,445		
CPI(M) hold		Swing		

=== 2001 ===
2001 West Bengal Legislative Assembly election: Sandeshkhali
Party	Candidate	Votes	%	±%
CPI(M)	Kanti Biswas	65,214	54.53	Winner
AITC	Ranjit Kumar Das	38,110	31.87	
BJP	Manmatha Bachher	16,263	13.60	
Majority		27,104	22.66	
Turnout		1,19,587	79.59	
CPI(M) hold		Swing		

=== 1972 ===
Debendra Nath Sinha of Congress won in 1972. Sarat Sarder of CPI(M) won in 1971 and 1969. Debendra Nath Sinha of Congress won in 1967. Ananta Kumar Baidya of Congress won in 1962. Haran Chandra Mondal, Independent, won in 1957. In independent India's first election in 1951, Jyotish Chandra Roy Sardar of Congress and Hemanta Kumar Ghoshal of CPI won the Haroa Sandeshkhali joint seat.
