= Hingalganj Assembly constituency =

Hingalganj
- Constituency No. 126 for the West Bengal Legislative Assembly
- Interactive Map Outlining Hingalganj Assembly Constituency

Constituency details
- Country: India
- Region: East India
- State: West Bengal
- District: North 24 Parganas
- Lok Sabha constituency: Basirhat
- Established: 1967
- Total electors: 243,747
- Reservation: SC

Member of Legislative Assembly
- 18th West Bengal Legislative Assembly
- Incumbent Rekha Patra
- Party: BJP
- Alliance: NDA
- Elected year: 2026

Hingalganj Assembly constituency is an assembly constituency in North 24 Parganas district in the Indian state of West Bengal. It is reserved for scheduled castes.

== Overview ==
As per orders of the Delimitation Commission, 126 Hingalganj Assembly constituency (SC) is composed of the following: Hingalganj community development block, and Barunhat Rameshwarpur, Bhabanipur I, Bhabanipur II, Hasnabad, PatliKhanpur gram panchayats of Hasnabad community development block, and Khulna gram panchayat of Sandeshkhali II community development block.

Hingalganj Assembly constituency is part of 18. Basirhat (Lok Sabha constituency).

== Members of the Legislative Assembly ==
Year	Member	Party
1967	B. N. Brahmachari	Independent politician
1969	Hazarilal Mondal	Communist Party of India
1971	Lalit Kumar Ghosh	Indian National Congress
1972	Anil Mondal	Communist Party of India (Marxist)
1977	Sudhansu Mondal	Communist Party of India (Marxist)
1982	Sudhansu Mondal	Communist Party of India (Marxist)
1987	Sudhansu Mondal	Communist Party of India (Marxist)
1991	Nripen Gayen	Communist Party of India (Marxist)
1996	Nripen Gayen	Communist Party of India (Marxist)
2001	Nripen Gayen	Communist Party of India (Marxist)
2006	Gopal Gayen	Communist Party of India (Marxist)
2011	Anandamoy Mondal	Communist Party of India
2016	Debes Mondal	Trinamool Congress
2021	Debes Mondal	Trinamool Congress
2026	Rekha Patra	Bharatiya Janata Party

== Election results ==
=== 2026 ===
2026 West Bengal Legislative Assembly election: Hingalganj
Party	Candidate	Votes	%	±%
BJP	Rekha Patra	100,207	48.39	+7.41
AITC	Ananda Sarkar	94,786	45.77	−8.01
CPI	Sangita Mandal	7,205	3.48	+0.39
NOTA	None of the above	1,660	0.8	−0.09
Majority		5,421	2.62	−10.18
Turnout		207,071	96.15	+10.95
BJP gain from AITC		Swing		

=== 2021 ===
2021 West Bengal Legislative Assembly election: Hingalganj
Party	Candidate	Votes	%	±%
AITC	Debes Mandal	104,706	53.78	
BJP	Nemai Das	79,790	40.98	
CPI	Ranjan Kumar Mondal	6,008	3.09	
NOTA	None of the above	1,736	0.89	
Majority		24,916	12.8	
Turnout		194,681	85.2	
AITC hold		Swing		

=== 2016 ===
In the 2016 election, Debesh Mondal of Trinamool Congress defeated his nearest rival, Anandamoy Mondal of CPI.

West Bengal assembly elections, 2016: Hingalganj (SC) constituency
Party	Candidate	Votes	%	±%
AITC	Debes Mondal	94,753	53.00	+7.89
CPI	Anandamoy Mondal	64,449	36.05	−9.70
BJP	Labanya Mondal	14,327	8.01	+3.27
Independent	Ranjit Gayen	1,921	1.07	
NOTA	None of the above	1,854	1.04	
BSP	Nitish Kumar Biswas	1,467	0.82	
Turnout		178,771	84.26	−1.72
AITC gain from CPI		Swing		

=== 2011 ===
In the 2011 election, Anandamoy Mondal of CPI defeated his nearest rival Debesh Mondal of Trinamool Congress,

West Bengal assembly elections, 2011: Hingalganj (SC) constituency
Party	Candidate	Votes	%	±%
CPI	Anandamoy Mondal	72,744	45.75	−5.67
AITC	Debes Mondal	71,726	45.11	+1.13#
BJP	Ratikanta Baulia	7,533	4.74	
Independent	Parimal Mistri	2,368		
BSP	Alipada Paik	1,846		
People’s Democratic Conference of India	Sunil Mandal	1,727		
Rashtriya Janasachetan Party	Nirmal Kumar Biswas	1,046		
Turnout		158,987	85.98	
CPI gain from CPI(M)		Swing	-6.80#	

.# Swing calculated on Congress+Trinamool Congress vote percentages taken together in 2006.

=== 2006 ===
In the 2006 assembly elections, Gopal Gayen of CPI(M) won the 99 Hingalganj (SC) assembly seat defeating his nearest rival Debes Mandal of Trinamool Congress. Contests in most years were multi cornered but only winners and runners are being mentioned. Nripen Gayen of CPI(M) defeated Sourendra Mondal of Trinamool Congress in 2001, Bidyut Kayal of Congress in 1996 and Sankar Roy of Congress in 1991. Sudhanshu Mondal of CPI(M) defeated Aditya Mondal of Congress in 1987 and Amal Krishna Mistry representing Congress in 1982 and representing Janata Party in 1977.

=== 1972 ===
Anil Chandra Mondal of CPI won in 1972. Gopal Chandra Gayen of CPI(M) won in 1971. Hazari Lal Mondal of CPI won in 1969. B.N. Brahmachari an independent won in 1967. Prior to that the Hingalganj seat was not there.
