= Basirhat (disambiguation) =

Basirhat is a city in India. It may also refer to:

- Basirhat subdivision, an administrative division in North 24 Parganas district in the Indian state of West Bengal
- Basirhat district, a proposed district carved out of North 24 Parganas district of West Benga.
- Basirhat I, a community development block in North 24 Parganas district in the Indian state of West Bengal
- Basirhat II, a community development block in North 24 Parganas district in the Indian state of West Bengal
- Basirhat (Lok Sabha constituency), a parliamentary constituency in North 24 Parganas district in the Indian state of West Bengal
- Basirhat Dakshin, an assembly constituency in North 24 Parganas district in the Indian state of West Bengal
- Basirhat Uttar, an assembly constituency in North 24 Parganas district in the Indian state of West Bengal
- Basirhat College, a degree college in Basirhat
- Basirhat railway station, a railway station located in Sealdah-Hasnabad railway section.
- Basirhat High School, a public school in Basirhat
- Basirhat Hari Mohan Dalal Girls' High School, a public school in Basirhat
- Basirhat Dakshina Kali Temple, a religious temple located in Basirhat
