= Lake Terrace =

Lake Terrace or Lake terrace may refer to

- Lake Terrace (skyscraper), a building in Dubai.
- Lake Terrace/Lake Oaks, New Orleans, a neighborhood of New Orleans.
- Lake Terrace, Basirhat, a neighborhood in Basirhat, West Bengal.
- Lake Terrace, an affluent neighbourhood of Ballygunge, Kolkata.
- Lake (lacustrine) terrace, the former shoreline of a lake.

== See also ==
- Terrace Lake
