= Dandirhat =

- Census Town
- Location in West Bengal, India Dandirhat (India)
- Coordinates: 22.640326°N 88.894343°E
- Country: India
- State: West Bengal
- District: North 24 Parganas
- Block: Basirhat I

Population (2011)
  - Total: 6,387

Languages
  - Official: Bengali, English
- Time zone: UTC+5:30 (IST)
- PIN: 743412
- Telephone code: 03217
- ISO 3166 code: IN-WB
- Vehicle registration: WB
- Lok Sabha constituency: Basirhat
- Vidhan Sabha constituency: Basirhat Dakshin
- Website: north24parganas.nic.in

Dandirhat is a census town in the Basirhat I CD block in the Basirhat subdivision of the North 24 Parganas district in the state of West Bengal, India.

== Geography ==
Cities, towns and locations in Basirhat subdivision, North 24 Parganas district
M: municipal town, CT: census town, R: rural/ urban centre
Owing to space constraints in the small map, the actual locations in a larger map may vary slightly

=== Location ===
Dandirhat is located at 22.640326°N 88.894343°E.

=== Area overview ===
The area shown in the map is a part of the Ichhamati-Raimangal Plain, located in the lower Ganges Delta. It contains soil of mature black or brownish loam to recent alluvium. Numerous rivers, creeks and khals criss-cross the area. The tip of the Sundarbans National Park is visible in the lower part of the map (shown in green but not marked). The larger full screen map shows the full forest area. A large section of the area is a part of the Sundarbans settlements. The densely populated area is an overwhelmingly rural area. Only 12.96% of the population lives in the urban areas and 87.04% of the population lives in the rural areas.

Note: The map alongside presents some of the notable locations in the subdivision. All places marked in the map are linked in the larger full screen map.

== Demographics ==
According to the 2011 Census of India, Dandirhat had a total population of 6,387, of which 3,248 (51%) were males and 3,139 (49%) were females. Population in the age range 0–6 years was 704. The total number of literate persons in Dandirhat was 4,152 (73.06% of the population over 6 years).

== Infrastructure ==
According to the District Census Handbook, North Twenty Four Parganas, 2011, Dandirhat covered an area of 3.3724 km^{2}. It had 7.4 km roads with both open and closed drains. The protected water-supply involved overhead tanks, service reservoir, tap water from untreated sources, tube well/ borewell. It had 1,434 domestic electric connections. Among the educational facilities, it had 4 primary schools, secondary and senior secondary schools at Fulbari 1.5 km away. The nearest college was 46 km away at Basirhat. It had 1 non-formal education centre (Sarvya Shiksha Abhiyan). Among the social, cultural and recreational facilities, it had a public library. It is well known for wooden furniture, embroidery work and ready-made garments. It has the branch offices of a nationalised bank and an agricultural credit society.

== Transport ==
SH 2 (locally known as Taki Road) passes through Dandirhat.

== Education ==
Dandirhat NK Uchcha Sikhsaniketan is a co-educational higher secondary school.
