= Uttar Bagundi =

- Census Town
- Location in West Bengal, India Uttar Bagundi (India)
- Coordinates: 22.641222°N 88.869567°E
- Country: India
- State: West Bengal
- District: North 24 Parganas

Area
  - Total: 2.3553 km^{2} (0.9094 sq mi)

Population (2011)
  - Total: 6,027
  - Density: 2,559/km^{2} (6,628/sq mi)

Languages
  - Official: Bengali, English
- Time zone: UTC+5:30 (IST)
- PIN: 743429
- Telephone code: 03217
- Vehicle registration: WB
- Lok Sabha constituency: Basirhat
- Vidhan Sabha constituency: Basirhat Dakshin

Uttar Bagundi is a census town in the Basirhat I CD block in the Basirhat subdivision of the North 24 Parganas district in the state of West Bengal, India.

== Geography ==
Cities, towns and locations in Basirhat subdivision, North 24 Parganas district
M: municipal town, CT: census town, R: rural/ urban centre
Owing to space constraints in the small map, the actual locations in a larger map may vary slightly

=== Location ===
Uttar Bagundi is located at 22.641222°N 88.869567°E.

=== Area overview ===
The area shown in the map is a part of the Ichhamati-Raimangal Plain, located in the lower Ganges Delta. It contains soil of mature black or brownish loam to recent alluvium. Numerous rivers, creeks and khals criss-cross the area. The tip of the Sundarbans National Park is visible in the lower part of the map (shown in green but not marked). The larger full screen map shows the full forest area. A large section of the area is a part of the Sundarbans settlements. The densely populated area is an overwhelmingly rural area. Only 12.96% of the population lives in the urban areas and 87.04% of the population lives in the rural areas.

Note: The map alongside presents some of the notable locations in the subdivision. All places marked in the map are linked in the larger full screen map.

== Demographics ==
According to the 2011 Census of India, Uttar Bagundi had a total population of 6,027, of which 3,072 (51%) were males and 2,955 (49%) were females. Population in the age range 0–6 years was 689. The total number of literate persons in Itinda was 3,598 (67.40% of the population over 6 years).

== Infrastructure ==
According to the District Census Handbook, North Twenty Four Parganas, 2011, Uttar Bagundi covered an area of 2.3553 km^{2}. It had 7.5 km roads with both open and closed drains. The protected water-supply involved overhead tanks, service reservoir, tap water from untreated sources, tube well/ borewell. It had 549 domestic electric connections. Among the medical facilities it had 1 medicine shop. Among the educational facilities, it had 3 primary schools, 1 middle school, secondary and senior secondary schools at Jirapukur 2 km away. The nearest college was 5 km away at Basirhat. It had 1 non-formal education centre (Sarvya Shiksha Abhiyan). Among the social, cultural and recreational facilities, it had a public library. It is well-known for embroidery work, cane & bamboo products, steel furniture.
