= Kalighat Temple =

Temple dedicated to Goddess Kali in India

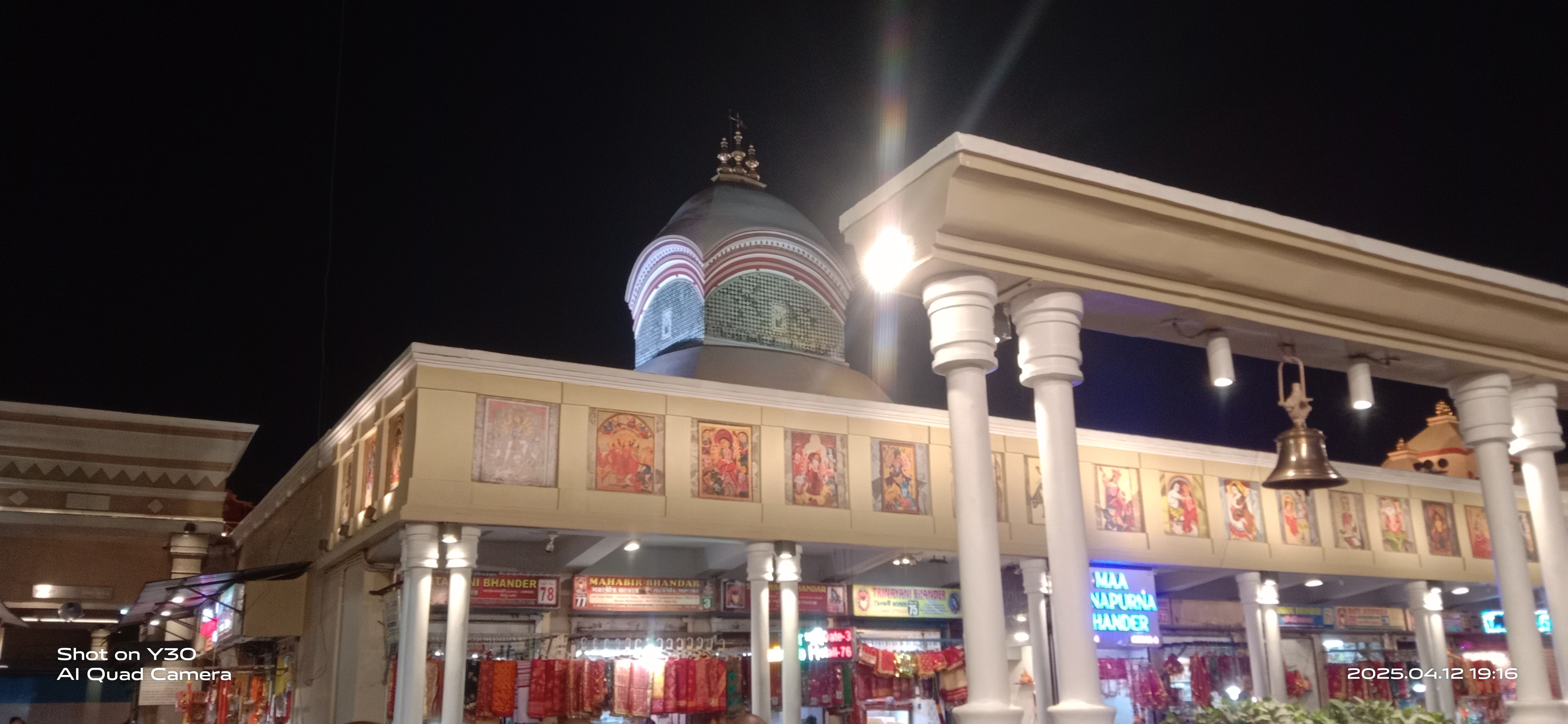
- Night view of the Kalighat Temple

- West Bengal

Religion
- Affiliation: Hinduism
- Deity: Kali
- Festival: Kali Puja

Location
- Location: Kolkata
- State: West Bengal
- Country: India
- Interactive map of Kalighat Temple
- Coordinates: 22°31′12″N 88°20′31″E

Architecture
- Completed: 1809

Website
- www.kalighatkalitemple.com

Kalighat Kali Temple is a Hindu temple in Kalighat, Kolkata, West Bengal, India, dedicated to the Hindu goddess Kali, one of the 10 Mahavidyas in the Hindu tantric tradition and the supreme deity in the Kalikula worship tradition. The temple is one of the 51 Shakti Pithas in India.

According to the Devi Bhagavata Purana, Kalika Purana and Shakti Peetha Stotram, the toes of the right foot of Goddess Sati fell here, after Lord Vishnu's Sudarshan Chakra splintered her body into many parts to calm down Mahadev's rage during his cosmic dance. One of the oldest and most important places of worship in Eastern India, being one of the four Adi Shaktipeeth the temple draws hundred of thousands of devotees throughout the year, especially on occasions like Kali Puja, New Year, Poila Baisakh, Snana Yatra, Durga Puja and the numerous Amavasyas.

== Legend and importance ==
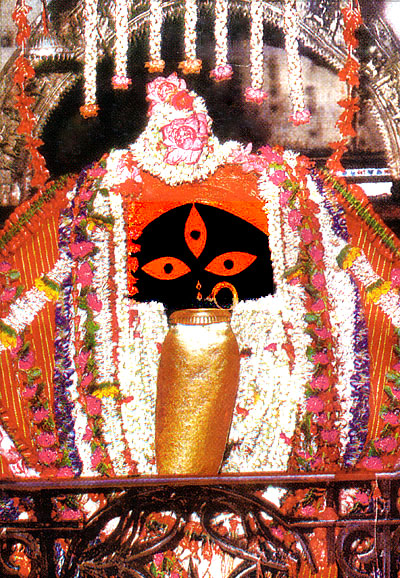
Idol of Devi Kali at Kalighat Temple

The term Kalighat originated from the goddess Kali, who resides in the temple, and Ghat (riverbank), where the temple is located. Due to the importance of Maa Kali in this region, the place is also known as the Kali kshetra.

According to scriptures, on learning about the death of Sati by self-immolation, Shiva was blinded in rage and started the Tandav Nritya (Dance of Destruction). To prevent the world from imminent destruction, Lord Vishnu used his Sudarshan Chakra to cut the corpse of Sati into 51 pieces, which fell in various places of the Indian subcontinent. Kalighat is the site where the toes of the right foot of Dakshayani or Sati are said to have fallen.

== History ==
The Kalighat Kali temple in its present form is about 200 years old, although it was referred to in Mansar Bhasan composed in the 15th century, and Kavi Kankan Chandi in the 17th century. Subsequently, it received patronage from some of the major Zamindar families from Bengal, among them the Bawali Raj and the Sabarna Roy Choudhury families being the most prominent.

The present structure of the temple was completed under the patronage of the Sabarna Roy Choudhury family in 1809. Santosh Roy Chowdhury, a Kali devotee himself, started the construction of the present-day temple in 1798. It took 11 years to complete the construction. The Roy Chowdhurys' traditional patronage of the deity is disputed. Pilgrims to the site practice a holy dipping event called Snan Yatra in the temple's Kundupukur tank.

In 1835 Kashinath Roy built a Nat Mandir in the temple square. In 1843 Vaishnavite Uday Narayan Mondal, a member of the Bawali Raj family, established the present day ShyamRai temple in the Kalighat temple square. In 1858 a Dal Mancha was installed by Madan Gopal Koley for the ShyamRai temple.

== Architecture ==
The temple is constructed according to the ath-chala style of Bengal temple architecture. The roofs of the temple are gabled roofs, known as the chala in Bengali, emulating the thatched roofed huts made of mud and twigs in rural Bengal.

The main temple is a four-sided building that features a truncated dome. The two roofs bear a total of eight faces. Both of them are painted in metallic silver colour while the borders at the cornice are painted with yellow, red, green and blue. The absolute top has three spires, the tallest of which has a triangular pennant flag. The outer walls of the temple are designed with diamond-shaped chessboard pattern styles of alternating green and white. The borders below the ath-chala are intricately designed with terracotta motifs of various Hindu deities and natural elements, which is a significant element in most of the historical temples in Bengal architecture.

== Renovation ==
In 2024, the 200-year old temple received its first major modern era renovation since its establishment in 1809. Undertaken at a budget of ₹200 crore, ₹165 crore was provided by the Kolkata Municipal Corporation, while Mukesh Ambani contributed ₹35 crore from the Reliance Foundation as a sign of devotion towards Maa Kali. Instead of changing the fundamentals and the existing intricate terracotta mixed ath-chala style architecture, the existing ethos was kept intact and renovated. The redevelopment works were undertaken by Quintessence (landscape architects) with the supervision of conservation architect Kalyan Chakraborty and artist Tamal Bhattacharya, they discovered delicate works of terracotta hidden under the ath-chala style roofs, which they tried to preserve, also adding some new designs into the existing framework.

Bhattacharya also discovered many nature-inspired terracotta motifs of flowers, birds and leaves, which had fallen into disrepair over the preceding two centuries. He decided to showcase them after the renovation as an essential part of the temple's originality and a reflection of its glorious past. Architecture students from Bishnupur were recruited to help with the terracotta work. Since it was difficult to find exact replicas of those terracotta works in the present day, they created some new motifs to replace the irreparably damaged ones.

The temple had 25 different types of tiles, which were brought according to availability, but not properly maintained. They were replaced by similar tiles to create a uniform look by sticker transfer and glazing. The pillars were repainted and the three spires on shikhara of the temple were covered with 50 kg gold. The tallest of the three spires was adorned with a golden flag, symbolising the spiritual dominance of the temple. A new wall was constructed to separate the market area from the main temple complex for better crowd management. The ventilation was improved and the removal of water from the belpatas was also done in details.

== See also ==
- Dakshineswar Kali Temple
- Basirhat Dakshina Kali Temple
