= Itinda Road, Basirhat =

Road in Basirhat, India

Itinda Road

Route information
- Length: 6.4 km (4.0 mi)

Major junctions
- West end: Trimohini Crossing, Basirhat
- East end: Itindaghat, Basirhat

Location
- Country: India
- State: West Bengal

Highway system
- Roads in India; Expressways; National; State; Asian; State Highways in West Bengal

Itinda Road, Basirhat, also recently renamed as Shahid Dinesh Majumder Road, is an important road in Basirhat city, located in the North 24 Parganas district of West Bengal, India and part of National Highway 312. It stretches from Basirhat Trimohini crossing to Itinda. It is one of the principal transit routes within the city, connecting markets and administrative areas.

== Importance ==
Itinda Road passes through the northern part Basirhat city. The Basirhat Old Market and New market area situated along Itinda Road. Many shopping malls and retail outlets have opened along this road, making it a significant shopping area of Basirhat.

== Postal and administrative details ==
The postal code for areas along Itinda Road are 743411 and 743412. Basirhat Police Station is located on Itinda Road.

== Surrounding areas ==
Itinda Village lies under Basirhat I administrative block, and the road leads toward this area.

== See also ==
- Basirhat
- Prantik Square, Basirhat
- Lake Terrace, Basirhat
