= Sarat Biswas Road, Basirhat =

Sarat Biswas Road
- Neighborhood
- Location in West Bengal, India Sarat Biswas Road (India)
- Coordinates: 22.661009°N 88.871586°E
- Country: India
- State: West Bengal
- District: North 24 Parganas
- City: Basirhat
- Time zone: UTC+5:30 (IST)
- PIN: 743411

Sarat Biswas Road is an affluent neighborhood in Basirhat, West Bengal, India. Many administrative offices are located in this area.

== Location ==
Sarat Biswas Road is situated in the eastern part of Basirhat, providing easy access to various parts of the city. This road connects the Itinda Road and the Martin Burn Road.

== Commercial area ==
The neighborhood has several retail stores, including More Supermarket and Titan, along with the presence of many banks and offices. The presence of Basirhat Municipality offices makes it an important area. Basirhat Sub-Correctional home also known as Basirhat Jail is present here.

== Culture and festivals ==
In Sarat Biswas Road, Two Durga Puja organizers, Town Club and Milan Sangha are located. During the Puja days, the area is decorated with vibrant lights, attracting many visitors.
