= Basirhat I =

- Community development block
- Interactive map of Basirhat I
- Coordinates: 22.66°N 88.89°E
- Country: India
- State: West Bengal
- District: North 24 Parganas

Government
  - Type: Representative democracy

Area
  - Total: 111.84 km^{2} (43.18 sq mi)
- Elevation: 9 m (30 ft)

Population (2011)
  - Total: 171,613
  - Density: 1,534.5/km^{2} (3,974.2/sq mi)

Languages
  - Official: Bengali, English

Literacy (2011)
  - Total literates: 108,530 (72.10%)
- Time zone: UTC+5:30 (IST)
- PIN: 743292 (Itinda); 743744 (Pifa)
- Telephone/STD code: 03217
- ISO 3166 code: IN-WB
- Vehicle registration: WB-23, WB-24, WB-25, WB-26
- Lok Sabha constituency: Basirhat
- Vidhan Sabha constituency: Basirhat Dakshin
- Website: north24parganas.nic.in

Basirhat I is a community development block that forms an administrative division in Basirhat subdivision of North 24 Parganas district in the Indian state of West Bengal.

== Geography ==
Basirhat is located at 22°40′N 88°53′E.

Basirhat I CD Block is bounded by Baduria CD Block in the north, Satkhira Sadar Upazila and Debhata Upazila in Satkhira District of Bangladesh in the east, Hasnabad, Minakhan and Haroa CD Blocks in the south and Basirhat II CD Block in the west. While Basirhat municipality is in the north-west, Taki municipality is in the south-east.

Basirhat I CD Block is part of the Ichhamati-Raimangal Plain, one of the three physiographic regions in the district located in the lower Ganges Delta. It contains soil of mature black or brownish loam to recent alluvium. The Ichhamati flows through the eastern part of the district. The Ichhamati flows in from the north-western part of the CD Block, cuts across the northern part of the CD Block and then flows along the eastern international boundary with Bangladesh.

Basirhat I CD Block has an area of 111.84 km^{2}. It has 1 panchayat samity, 7 gram panchayats, 97 gram sansads (village councils), 63 mouzas and 62 inhabited villages, according to the District Statistical Handbook: North 24 Parganas. Basirhat police station serves this block. Headquarters of this CD Block is at Basirhat.

Gram panchayats of Basirhat I block/ panchayat samiti are: Gachha Akharpur, Itinda Panitor, Pifa, Sankchura Begundi, Gotra, Nimdaria Kodalia and Sangrampur-Shibhati.

== Demographics ==
=== Population ===
As per 2011 Census of India Basirhat I CD Block had a total population of 171,613, of which 150,520 were rural and 21,093 were urban. There were 87,717 (51%) males and 83,896 (49%) females. Population below 6 years was 21,094. Scheduled Castes numbered 22,070 (12.86%) and Scheduled Tribes numbered 1,268 (0.74%).

As per 2001 census, Basirhat I block has a total population of 146,836 out of which 75,035 were males and 71,801 were females.

There are three census towns in Basirhat I CD Block (2011 census figures in brackets): Itinda (8,679), Dandirhat (P) (6,387) and Uttar Bagundi (6,027).

Large villages in Basirhat I CD Block (2011 census figures in brackets): Pipha (5,700), Debhog (4,430), Gotra (5,894), Goknashri Gobindapur (4,110), Sangrampur (7,233), Merudandi (4,730), Akharpur (6,204), Gachha (6,489), Panitar (13,947), Hariharpur (4,477) and Kodalia (5,896).

North 24 Parganas district is densely populated, mainly because of the influx of refugees from East Pakistan (later Bangladesh). With a density of population of 2,182 per km^{2} in 1971, it was 3rd in terms of density per km^{2} in West Bengal after Kolkata and Howrah, and 20th in India. According to the District Human Development Report: North 24 Parganas, “High density is also explained partly by the rapid growth of urbanization in the district. In 1991, the percentage of urban population in the district has been 51.23.”

Decadal Population Growth Rate (%)

The decadal growth of population in Basirhat I CD Block in 2001–2011 was 16.16%. The decadal growth of population in Basirhat I CD Block in 1991–2001 was 20.94%.

The decadal growth rate of population in North 24 Parganas district was as follows: 47.9% in 1951–61, 34.5% in 1961–71, 31.4% in 1971–81, 31.7% in 1981–91, 22.7% in 1991–2001 and 12.0% in 2001-11. The decadal growth rate for West Bengal in 2001-11 was 13.93%. The decadal growth rate for West Bengal was 17.84% in 1991–2001, 24.73% in 1981–1991 and 23.17% in 1971–1981.

The decadal growth rate of population in neighbouring Satkhira District in Bangladesh was 6.50% for the decade 2001–2011, down from 16.75% in the decade 1991–2001 and 17.90% in the decade 1981–1991.

Only a small portion of the border with Bangladesh has been fenced and it is popularly referred to as a porous border. It is freely used by Bangladeshi infiltrators, terrorists, smugglers, criminals. et al.

See also – Basirhat for information on cattle smuggling and border fencing

=== Literacy ===
As per the 2011 census, the total number of literates in Basirhat I CD Block was 108,530 (72.10% of the population over 6 years) out of which males numbered 58,344 (75.86% of the male population over 6 years) and females numbered 50,186 (68.18% of the female population over 6 years). The gender disparity (the difference between female and male literacy rates) was 7.67%.

See also – List of West Bengal districts ranked by literacy rate

Literacy in CD blocks of
North 24 Parganas district
Barasat Sadar subdivision
Amdanga – 80.69%
Deganga – 79.65%
Barasat I – 81.50%
Barasat II – 77.71%
Habra I – 83.15%
Habra II – 81.05%
Rajarhat – 83.13%
Basirhat subdivision
Baduria – 78.75%
Basirhat I – 72.10%
Basirhat II – 78.30%
Haroa – 73.13%
Hasnabad – 71.47%
Hingalganj – 76.85%
Minakhan – 71.33%
Sandeshkhali I – 71.08%
Sandeshkhali II – 70.96%
Swarupnagar – 77.57%
Bangaon subdivision
Bagdah – 75.30%
Bangaon – 79.71%
Gaighata – 82.32%
Barrackpore subdivision
Barrackpore I – 85.91%
Barrackpore II – 84.53%
Source: 2011 Census: CD Block Wise
Primary Census Abstract Data

=== Language and religion ===
Religion in Basirhat I CD block (2011)
Islam	68.54%
Hinduism	31.24%
Other or not stated	0.17%

In the 2011 census Muslims numbered 141,617 and formed 68.54% of the population in Basirhat I CD Block. Hindus numbered 50,261 and formed 31.24% of the population. Others numbered 375 and formed 0.22% of the population.

In 1981 Muslims numbered 62,735 and formed 69.88% of the population and Hindus numbered 27,032 and formed 30.42% of the population in Basirhat I CD Block. In 1981 Hindus numbered 69,052 and formed 55.09% of the population and Muslims numbered 54,437 and formed 44.01% of the population in Basirhat II CD Block. In 1991 Muslims numbered 187,528 and formed 65.54% of the population and Hindus numbered 98,619 and formed 34.46% of the population in Basirhat I and Basirhat II CD Blocks taken together. (In 1981 and 1991 census was conducted as per jurisdiction of the police station). In 2001 in Baduria CD block Muslims were 98,638 (66.76%) and Hindus 48,999 (33.17%).

Bengali is the predominant language, spoken by 99.84% of the population.

== Rural Poverty ==
31.32% of households in Basirhat I CD Block lived below poverty line in 2001, against an average of 29.28% in North 24 Parganas district.

=== Livelihood ===
Livelihood
in Basirhat I CD Block
1. Cultivators (13.2%)
2. Agricultural labourers (24.0%)
3. Household industries (10.3%)
4. Other Workers (52.4%)

In Basirhat I CD Block, amongst the class of total workers, cultivators numbered 8,407 and formed 13.24% of the total workers, agricultural labourers numbered 15,242 and formed 24.00%, household industry workers numbered 6,553 and formed 10.32% and other workers numbered 33,301 and formed 52.44%. Total workers numbered 65,503 and formed 37.00% of the total population, and non-workers numbered 108,110 and formed 63.00% of the population.

In more than 30 percent of the villages in North 24 Parganas, agriculture or household industry is no longer the major source of livelihood for the main workers there. The CD Blocks in the district can be classified as belonging to three categories: border areas, Sundarbans area and other rural areas. The percentage of other workers in the other rural areas category is considerably higher than those in the border areas and Sundarbans area.

Note: In the census records a person is considered a cultivator, if the person is engaged in cultivation/ supervision of land owned by self/government/institution. When a person who works on another person’s land for wages in cash or kind or share, is regarded as an agricultural labourer. Household industry is defined as an industry conducted by one or more members of the family within the household or village, and one that does not qualify for registration as a factory under the Factories Act. Other workers are persons engaged in some economic activity other than cultivators, agricultural labourers and household workers. It includes factory, mining, plantation, transport and office workers, those engaged in business and commerce, teachers, entertainment artistes and so on.

=== Infrastructure ===
There are 59 inhabited villages in Basirhat I CD Block, as per the District Census Handbook: North 24 Parganas. 100% villages have power supply and drinking water supply. 10 villages (16.95%) have post offices. 56 villages (94.92%) have telephones (including landlines, public call offices and mobile phones). 38 villages (64.41%) have a pucca approach road and 23 villages (38.98%) have transport communication (includes bus service, rail facility and navigable waterways). 6 villages (10.17%) have agricultural credit societies and 5 villages (8.47% ) have banks.

=== Border checkpoint ===
Ghojadanga has passenger and goods transit and customs facilities on the India-Bangladesh border. It is proposed to be developed as an Integrated Check Point.

=== Agriculture ===
The North 24 Parganas district Human Development Report opines that in spite of agricultural productivity in North 24 Parganas district being rather impressive 81.84% of rural population suffered from shortage of food. With a high urbanisation of 54.3% in 2001, the land use pattern in the district is changing quite fast and the area under cultivation is declining. However, agriculture is still the major source of livelihood in the rural areas of the district.

From 1977 on wards major land reforms took place in West Bengal. Land in excess of land ceiling was acquired and distributed amongst the peasants. Following land reforms land ownership pattern has undergone transformation. In 2010-11, persons engaged in agriculture in Basirhat I CD Block could be classified as follows: bargadars 2,452 (8.62%), patta (document) holders 2,680 (9.42%), small farmers (possessing land between 1 and 2 hectares) 765 (2.69%), marginal farmers (possessing land up to 1 hectare) 13,000 (45.69%) and agricultural labourers 9,554 (33.58%).

Basirhat I CD Block had 140 fertiliser depots, 46 seed stores and 3 fair price shops in 2010-11.

In 2010-11, Basirhat I CD Block produced 11,849 tonnes of Aman paddy, the main winter crop from 4,018 hectares, 4,672 tonnes of Boro paddy (spring crop) from 1,453 hectares, 303 tonnes of Aus paddy (summer crop) from 108 hectares, 1,660 tonnes of wheat from 563 hectares, 50,465 tonnes of jute from 2,972 hectares and 3,645 tonnes of potatoes from 115 hectares. It also produced pulses and oilseeds.

In Basirhat I CD Block in 2010-11, 38 hectares were irrigated by deep tube well.

=== Pisciculture ===
In 2010-11, the net area under effective pisciculture in Basirhat I CD Block was 1,227.09 hectares. 11,205 persons were engaged in the profession. Approximate annual production was 36,812.7 quintals.

=== Banking ===
In 2010-11, Basirhat I CD Block had offices of 9 commercial bank and 1 gramin bank.

== Transport ==
In 2010-11, Basirhat I CD Block had 1 ferry service and 16 originating/ terminating bus routes.

State Highway 2 passes through this CD Block.

There are stations like – Bhyabla Halt railway station and Basirhat railway station on the Barasat-Hasnabad line.

== Education ==
In 2010-11, Basirhat I CD Block had 89 primary schools with 10,045 students, 2 middle school with 766 students, 10 high schools with 4,654 students and 8 higher secondary schools with 2,682 students. Basirhat I CD Block had 333 institutions for special and non-formal education with 14,911 students.

As per the 2011 census, in Basirhat I CD Block, amongst the 59 inhabited villages, 2 villages did not have a school, 34 villages had more than 1 primary school, 29 villages had at least 1 primary and 1 middle school and 16 villages had at least 1 middle and 1 secondary school.

== Healthcare ==
In 2011, Basirhat I CD Block had 1 block primary health centre and 1 primary health centre, with total 21 beds and 3 doctors (excluding private bodies). It had 19 family welfare subcentres. 1,233 patients were treated indoor and 52,642 patients were treated outdoor in the hospitals, health centres and subcentres of the CD Block.

Shibhati Block Primary Health Centre at Shibhati with 15 beds functions as the main medical facility in Basirhat I CD Block. There is a primary health centre at Nakuda (with 10 beds).

Basirhat I block is one of the areas where ground water is affected by arsenic contamination.
