= Basirhat High School =

- বসিরহাট হাই স্কুল

Location
- Eastern Township Lane, Basirhat; Basirhat, West Bengal, 743411; India
- Coordinates: 22.661985°N 88.873824°E

Information
- Type: Public school
- Established: 1877
- School board: West Bengal Board of Secondary Education; West Bengal Council of Higher Secondary Education
- Gender: Boys
- Language: Bengali
- Campus type: Urban
- Affiliation: WBBSE, WBCHSE

Basirhat High School (Bengali: বসিরহাট হাই স্কুল) is one of the oldest educational institutions in Basirhat, North 24 Parganas district, West Bengal, India. Established in 1877, the school has been a prominent centre for secondary and higher secondary education in the region. It is affiliated with the West Bengal Board of Secondary Education (WBBSE) and the West Bengal Council of Higher Secondary Education (WBCHSE).

== History ==
Basirhat High School was established in 1877 during the British colonial period, making it one of the earliest schools in eastern Bengal. Over the years, it became a landmark institution for education and social reform in the Basirhat region.

In the year of 1929, the school was visited by Netaji Subhas Chandra Bose, one of India’s most prominent freedom fighters. His visit inspired students and teachers to participate in the freedom movement and spread awareness about national unity and self-reliance.

== Campus ==
The school is located on Dinesh Majumder Road, near the Sarat Biswas Road. It has a large urban campus with classrooms, a library, computer laboratories, and a playground. The school offers education from class V to class XII.

== Academics ==
Basirhat High School follows the syllabus prescribed by the WBBSE for the Madhyamik (secondary) level and the WBCHSE for the Higher Secondary level. The medium of instruction is Bengali, with English taught as a second language.

== Extracurricular activities ==
The school organizes various extracurricular activities, including annual sports, cultural programs, debates, and science exhibitions. Students also participate in district and state-level competitions.

== Notable alumni ==
- Dipendu Biswas
