= Basirhat =

City in West Bengal, India

Basirhat (বসিরহাট)
- Municipal Area
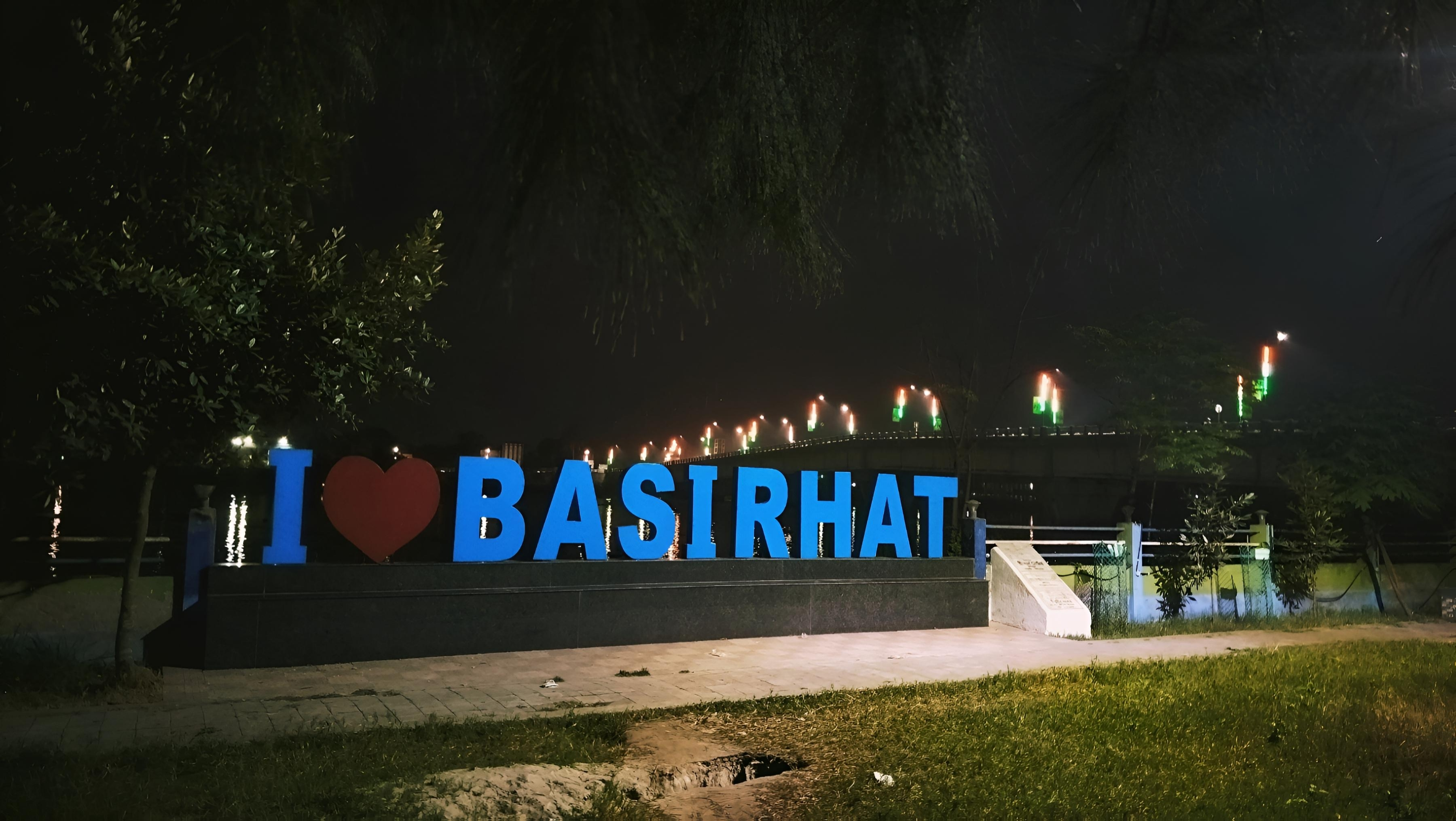
- Rabindra Saikat Park, located in the banks of Ichamati river, Basirhat
- Nickname: Gateway to the Sundarbans
- Location in West Bengal, India Basirhat (India)
- Coordinates: 22°39′40″N 88°51′58″E
- Country: India
- State: West Bengal
- District: North 24 Parganas

Government
  - Type: Municipality
  - Body: Basirhat Municipal Office
  - Chairman: Currently there is no chairman elected. Jasleen Kaur, IAS (SDO) was appointed and continues to serve as the official Administrator overseeing the civic body's operations temporarily.

Area
  - Total: 22.50 km^{2} (8.69 sq mi)
- Elevation: 6 m (20 ft)

Population (2011)
  - Total: 125,254
  - Density: 5,567/km^{2} (14,420/sq mi)

Languages
  - Official: Bengali, English
  - Native: Bengali
- Time zone: UTC+5:30 (IST)
- PIN: 743411, 743412, 743422
- Area code: 3217
- Vehicle registration: WB-21
- Lok Sabha constituency: Basirhat
- Vidhan Sabha constituency: Basirhat Dakshin, Basirhat Uttar
- Website: https://basirhatmunicipality.in

Basirhat is a city and a Greater Municipal Urban Agglomeration region of North 24 Parganas district in the Indian state of West Bengal. It serves as the headquarters of the Basirhat subdivision and is the largest city in the eastern part of North 24 Parganas. Established on 1 April 1869, Basirhat is one of the oldest municipal boards in the Bengal Province. The city is famous for Durga Puja and home of more than 100 durga puja committees.

Basirhat ranks among the cleanest cities of India, in terms of waste management, according to a survey held by the Ministry of Housing and Urban Affairs of Central Government of India. Basirhat is the first city of West Bengal to launch QR code based geo tagging system for real time monitoring of waste management.

Basirhat is officially set to become a new district. It was announced by Swapan Dasgupta, Finance Minister of West Bengal during the West Bengal state budget presentation of financial year 2026-27. It will be carved out of the existing North 24 Parganas district

== Etymology ==
According to Dr. Sukumar Sen (linguist), Basirhat is named after a person named 'Basi'. Referring to Bengali Dictionary, the word Basi means-Indriya Basban (ইন্দ্রিয় বসবান), Jitendriya (জিতেন্দ্রিয়), Apradhin (অপরাজেয়), Sadhin (স্বাধীন), and Swatantra (স্বতন্ত্র). From this it may be concluded that Basirhat was an independent tax-free business centre. Like present day's Free Business Centres.

The sources which are considered till now behind the naming of Basirhat are as follows:

•Basurhat – market for various items.

•Banserhat – market for buying and selling bamboos.

•Bastirhat – low land market.

There is a lot of controversy and debate regarding the naming of "Basirhat". But all explanations are satisfying and are causally related in some or other way.

== History ==
According to different historians, there are various sources of the name of Basirhat. At the time of formation of the sub-division, the place of administrative work was Bagundi village in present Soladana on the banks of Ichamati river. Bagundi was chosen by the East India Company as the center of the salt trade and the 'Salt Superintendent' office was established there. Salt was made from the saline water of Ichamati. Because of that, during the British period, salt balls were made in different villages of Basirhat along the Ichamati river. Basirhat city was a trading center for salt. In 1822, Prince Dwarkanath Tagore became the 'Nimki Dewan' or Serestadar. Dwarkanath used to come to Bagundi from Baranagar Ghat in Calcutta by way of Ichamati River. Taki's zamindar Munshi Kalinath Roychowdhury had his accommodation. Another product of trade here was indigo. Indigo cultivation started in Basirhat in 1810. Neelkuthi is built on both sides of Ichamati. British ran the business of salt and indigo cultivation centered on Basirhat. Hat on the banks of the Ichamati river in 1840 and the old bazaar of Basirhat was established 60 years later in 1900. Basirhat New Market was established in 1922. Rivers were the means of communication at will. Goods were brought by the river and sold in the market.

== Geography ==
Cities, towns and locations in Basirhat subdivision, North 24 Parganas district
M: municipal city/ town, CT: census town, R: rural/ urban centre
Owing to space constraints in the small map, the actual locations in a larger map may vary slightly

=== Location ===
Basirhat is located at 22°39′40″N 88°51′59″E.

=== Area overview ===
The area shown in the map is a part of the Ichhamati-Raimangal Plain, located in the lower Ganges Delta. It contains soil of mature black or brownish loam to recent alluvium. Numerous rivers, creeks and khals criss-cross the area. The tip of the Sundarbans National Park is visible in the lower part of the map (shown in green but not marked). The larger full screen map shows the full forest area. A large section of the area is a part of the Sundarbans settlements. The densely populated area is an overwhelmingly rural area. Only 12.96% of the population lives in the urban areas like Basirhat and 87.04% of the population in rural areas.

Note: The map alongside presents some of the notable locations in the subdivision. All places marked in the map are linked in the larger full-screen map.

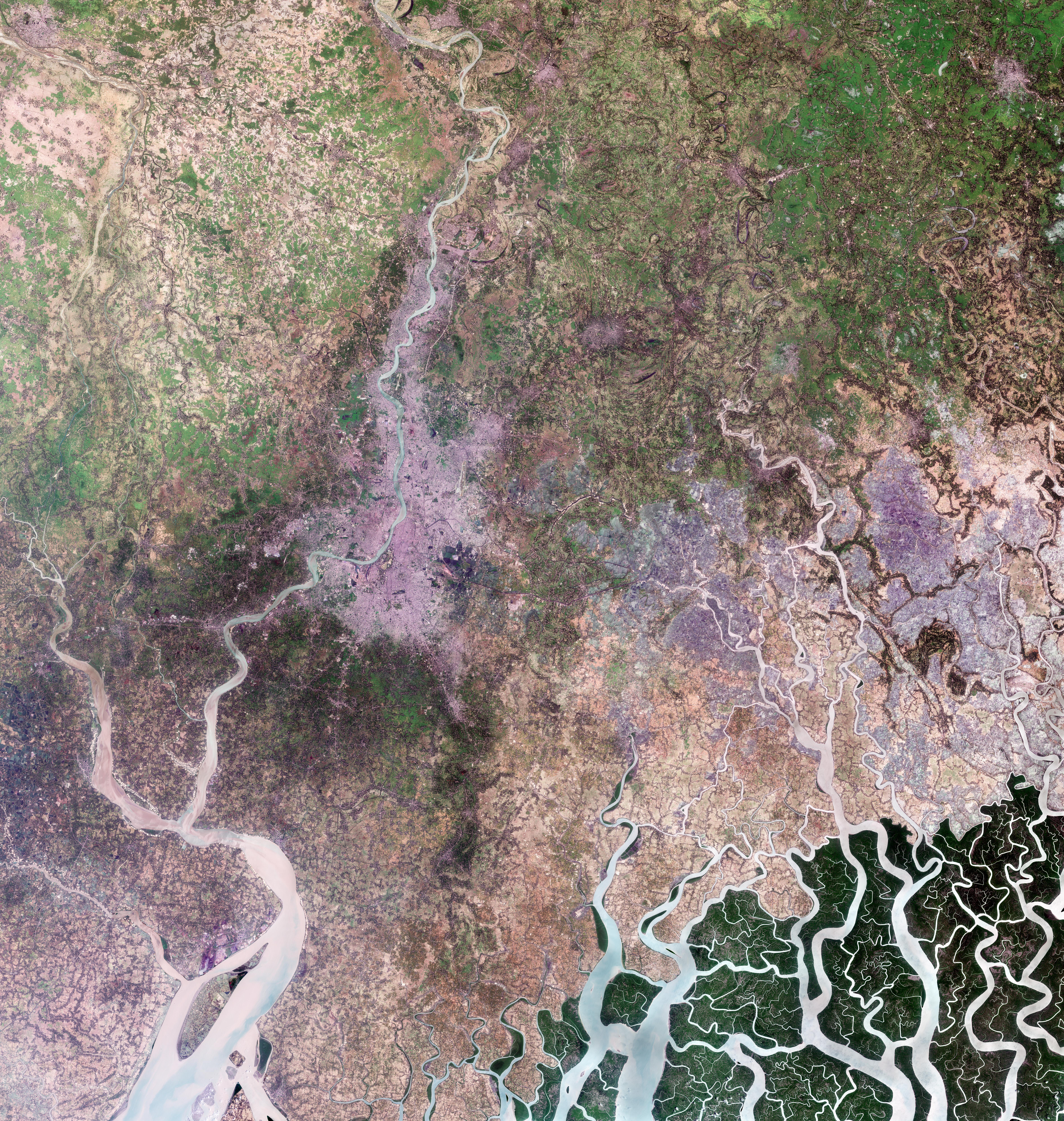
A map of Kolkata Metropolitan Area including Basirhat- The Sunderbans, and other parts of South-Eastern Gangetic West Bengal and South-Western Bangladesh

=== Urban structure ===
Basirhat experienced moderate level of urbanization during the years 2001-2011 along with moderate population growth rate in those same years. Currently urbanization rate of this city is increasing rapidly.

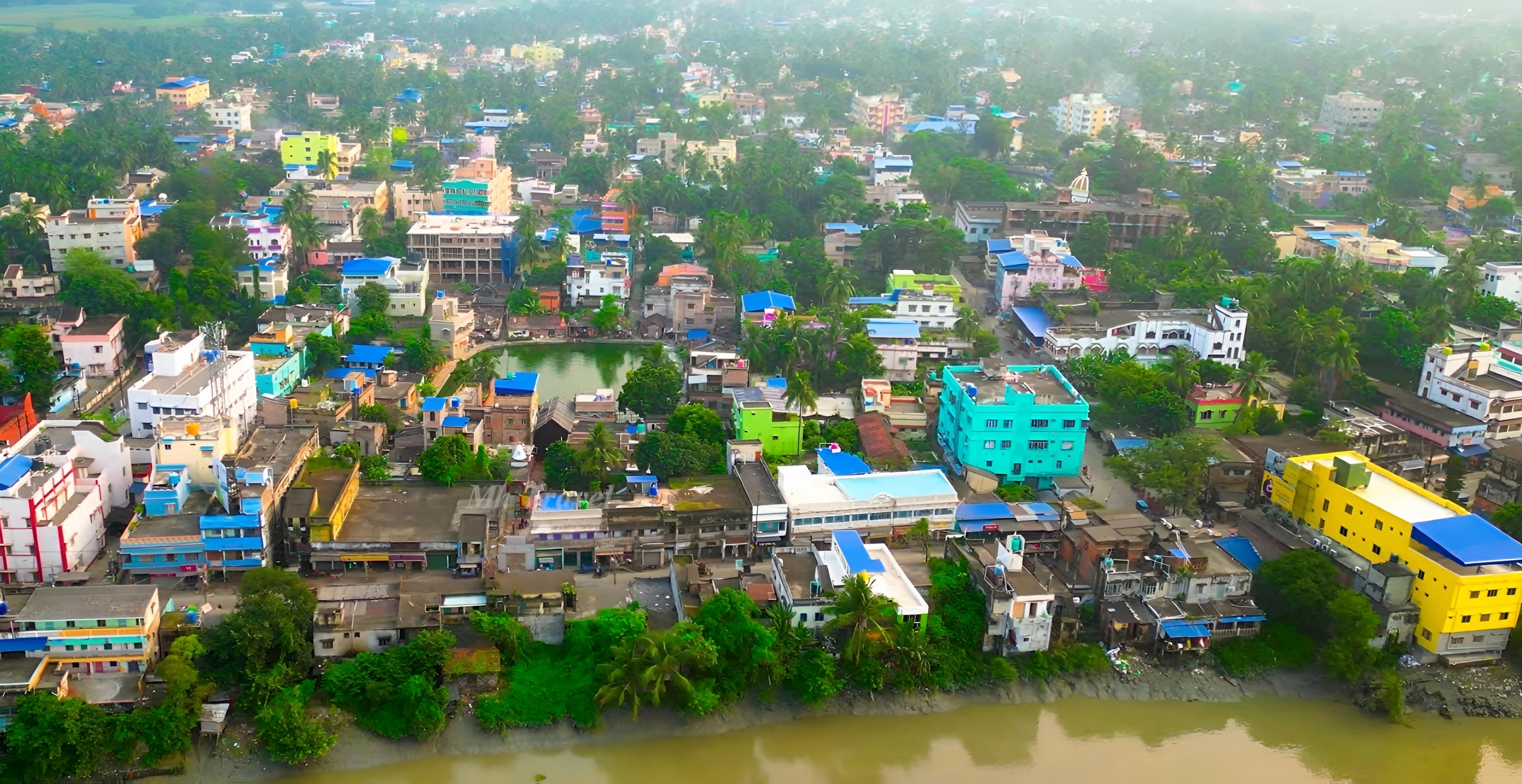
An aerial tableau of Basirhat, West Bengal, intricating the urban morphology of the city.

==== Neighborhoods ====
Lake Terrace, Tannery Garden, BowBazar, Chowmatha, Itinda Road, Sarat Biswas Road, Kacchari Para, Park Avenue, Ganapatipur, Sainpala, Prantik Square (College Para), Maitra Bagan, Munsi Bagan, Bhyabla.

=== Climate ===
Basirhat is subject to a tropical savanna climate that is designated Aw climate under the Köppen climate classification. According to a United Nations Development Programme report, its wind and cyclone zone is "very high damage risk". This municipal region is usually the hottest region of Basirhat subdivision due to its urbanized characteristics.

Special weather phenomena - Often, in April–June, the region is struck by heavy rains or dusty squalls that are followed by thunderstorms or hailstorms, bringing cooling relief from the prevailing humidity. These thunderstorms are convective in nature, and are known locally as Kalbaisakhi (কালবৈশাখী), or 'norwesters' in English.

Climate data for Basirhat City
Month	Jan	Feb	Mar	Apr	May	Jun	Jul	Aug	Sep	Oct	Nov	Dec	Year
Record high °C (°F)	34.2 (93.6)	38.5 (101.3)	44.2 (111.6)	46.1 (115.0)	43.3 (109.9)	36 (97)	35.7 (96.3)	39.8 (103.6)	36.6 (97.9)	36.1 (97.0)	35.2 (95.4)	33.5 (92.3)	46.1 (115.0)
Mean daily maximum °C (°F)	28.0 (82.4)	31.9 (89.4)	36.1 (97.0)	38.7 (101.7)	38.2 (100.8)	36.2 (97.2)	33.4 (92.1)	32.9 (91.2)	32.6 (90.7)	31.9 (89.4)	30.9 (87.6)	28.3 (82.9)	33.3 (91.9)
Mean daily minimum °C (°F)	14.6 (58.3)	18.6 (65.5)	21.9 (71.4)	25.9 (78.6)	28.6 (83.5)	28.9 (84.0)	27.6 (81.7)	27.1 (80.8)	26.4 (79.5)	22.7 (72.9)	18.0 (64.4)	14.8 (58.6)	24.4 (75.9)
Record low °C (°F)	6.4 (43.5)	7.1 (44.8)	13.6 (56.5)	17.2 (63.0)	21.6 (70.9)	20.1 (68.2)	19.5 (67.1)	22 (72)	19.3 (66.7)	17.8 (64.0)	15 (59)	5.2 (41.4)	5.2 (41.4)
Average rainfall mm (inches)	3.2 (0.13)	11.3 (0.44)	19.8 (0.78)	40.9 (1.61)	71.3 (2.81)	176.3 (6.94)	251.1 (9.89)	247.0 (9.72)	181.4 (7.14)	104.2 (4.10)	38.4 (1.51)	6.8 (0.27)	96.0 (3.78)
Average rainy days	0.6	2.0	4.3	7.8	12.8	21.9	28.3	29.1	24.4	14.2	2.6	1.1	12.4
Average relative humidity (%)	43.8	41.6	47.8	57.2	62.7	68.1	76.8	79.9	81.1	74.9	58.9	48.6	61.8
Source: Weather & Climate

=== Natural disasters ===
==== Tropical Cyclones ====
In May 2009, Cyclone Aila brought heavy rainfall and strong winds, causing damage to weak structures.

In May 2020, Cyclone Amphan affected the area with maximum sustained wind speed of 150 km/h. This severe cyclone caused major damage to houses and crops in the area. Prime minister Narendra Modi was received at the airport by governor Jagdeep Dhankhar and chief minister Mamata Banerjee who accompanied him on the aerial survey of some of the worst-affected parts of the state before landing in Basirhat College, 50 km from Kolkata airport. After holding a conference in Basirhat, Modi announced Rs 1,000 cr immediate relief for cyclone hit areas.

==== Earthquake ====
On 27 February 2026, an earthquake of about 5.3 on the Richter scale, as reported by the United States Geological Survey (USGS), struck near the India–Bangladesh border, with its epicentre located roughly 26 km southeast of Taki in West Bengal at a shallow depth of approximately 9.8 km. Tremors from the quake were felt in Basirhat city region and other parts of North 24 Parganas, causing panic among residents and prompting many to evacuate homes, offices, and schools in Basirhat. Only minor structural cracks in buildings were reported in the urban region. The seismic event occurred within the seismically active Bengal Basin region, where the Indian Plate's northward movement against the Eurasian Plate generates occasional moderate earthquakes.

==== Tornado ====
In April 1983, Basirhat-Bongaon tornado occurred in the area with maximum sustained wind speed of 200 km/h caused widespread damage and more than 30 fatalities across the area.

==== Hailstorm ====
On 19 February 2025, a series of severe Hailstorm and Convective thunderstorms occurred in the Basirhat subdivision, including the municipal region, causing minor damages to weak structures and agriculture.

A similar incident occurred on 22 March 2014, when a 20-minute hailstorm event caused damage to approximately 2,500 homes in parts of North 24 Parganas, including Barasat, Basirhat, Barrackpore and Bongaon.

== Demographics ==
Religion in Basirhat municipality (2011)
Religion	Percent
Hinduism	77.60%
Islam	22.21%
Others	0.19%

According to the 2011 census of India, Basirhat Municipality had a population of 125,254. Basirhat had a sex ratio of 981 females per 1000 males and a literacy rate of 87.35%. Scheduled Castes and Scheduled Tribes make up 18.94% and 0.41% of the population respectively.

Basirhat is an urban agglomeration consisting of four different neighborhoods; Basirhat City (M), Uttar Bagundi (CT), Raghunathpur (CT) and Dandirhat (CT).

Projection based on past growth rates estimate that as of 2026, the population of Basirhat city is around 180000 to 190000. While the broader UA region is estimated to have an population of approximately 212000. The current literacy rate of Basirhat is projected around more than 97.5%.

Bengali is the predominant language, spoken by 99.77% of the population.

=== Greater Basirhat Urban Agglomeration ===
The Greater Basirhat Urban Agglomeration comprises the municipal urban agglomeration of Basirhat city along with two additional municipal towns, Taki and Baduria. According to the 2011 Census of India, the Basirhat Municipality recorded a population of around 125,000, while Taki and Baduria municipalities had populations of about 38,000 and 52,000 respectively. With the inclusion of nearby census towns and peri-urban settlements, the Greater Basirhat Urban Agglomeration is estimated to have a population of approximately one million, thereby qualifying as a greater urban agglomeration under Indian census definitions. It forms the second major urban cluster in North 24 Parganas after Barasat-Barrackpore-Baranagar belt.

== Art and Culture ==
=== Durga puja ===
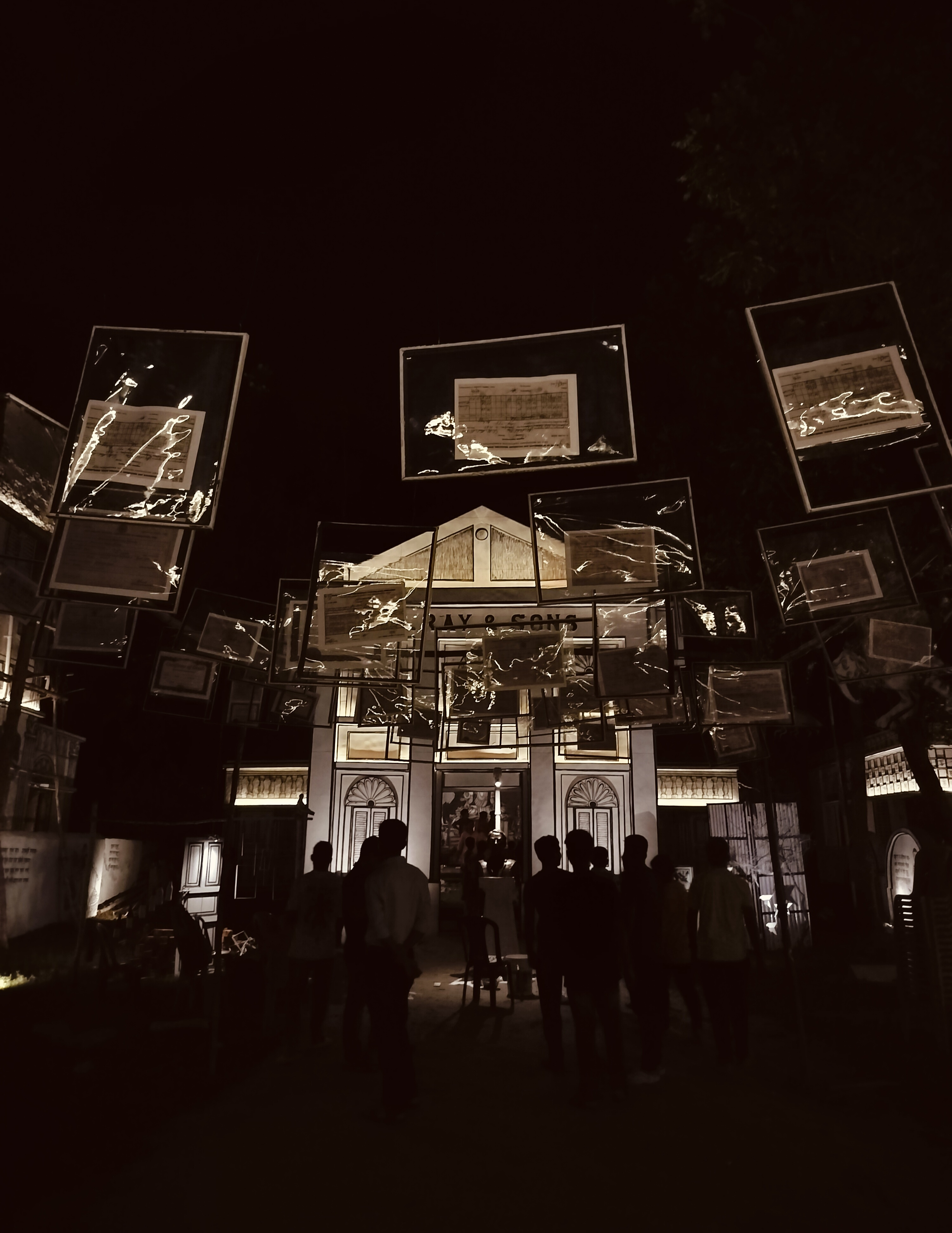
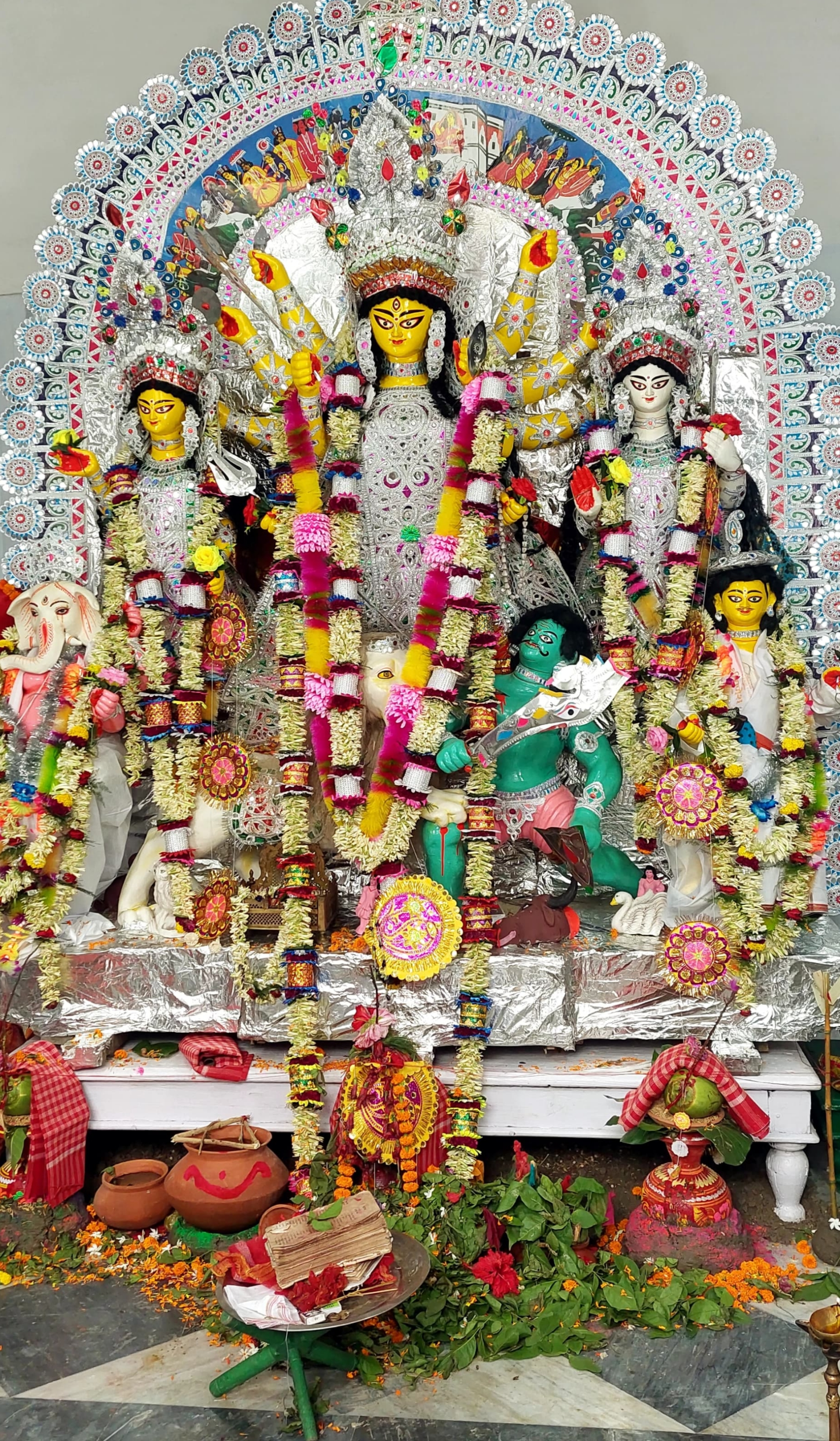
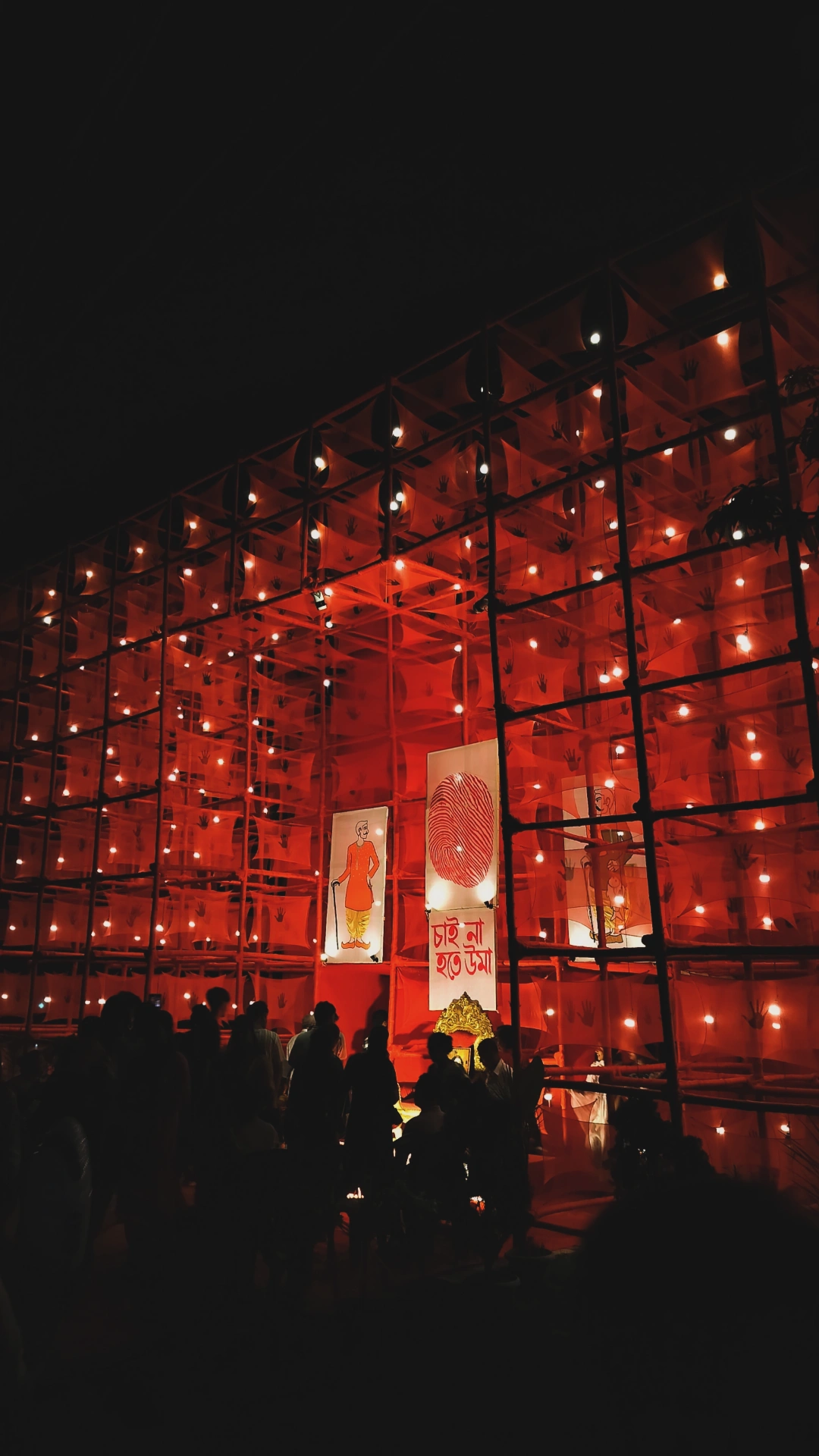
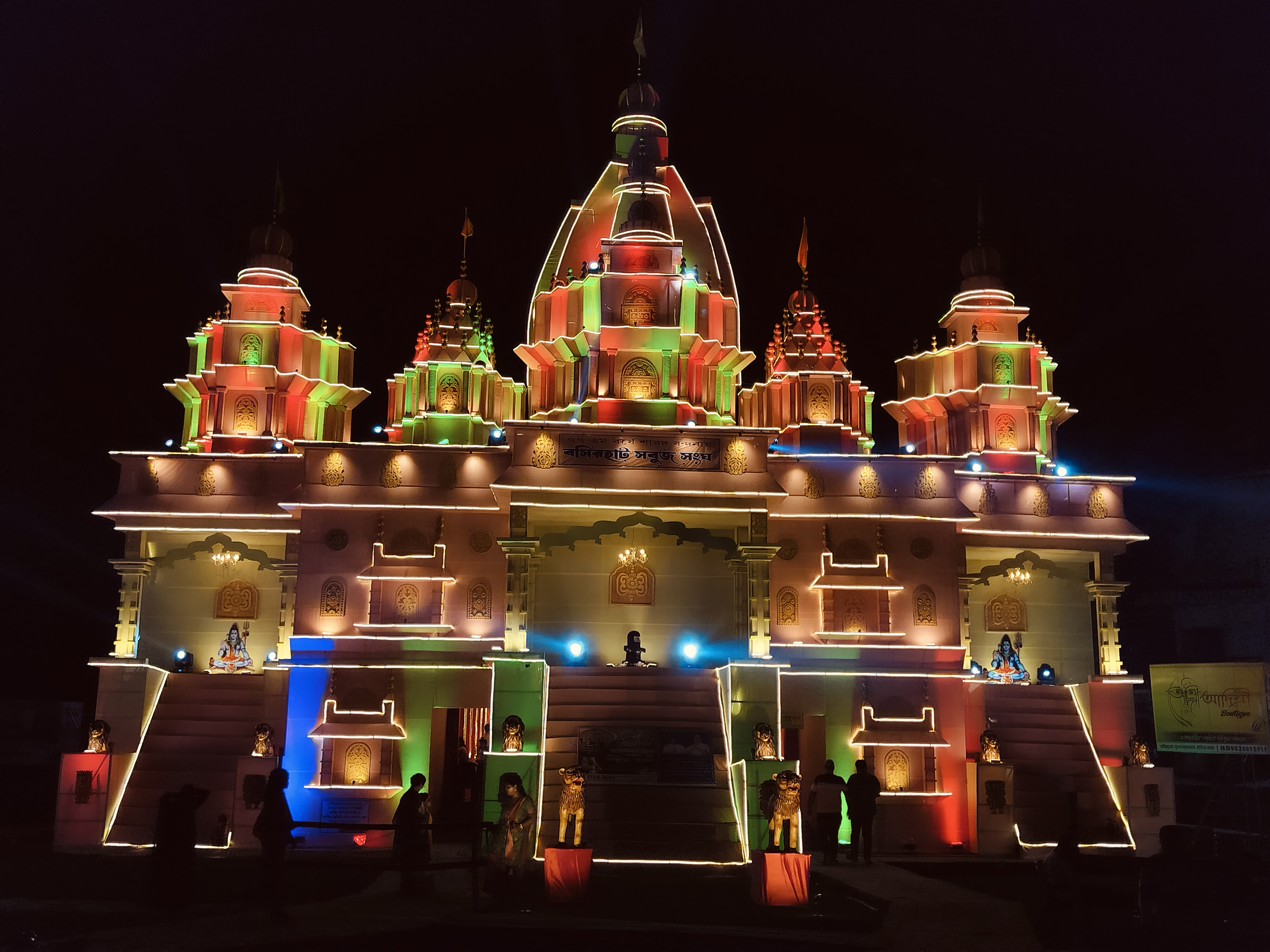
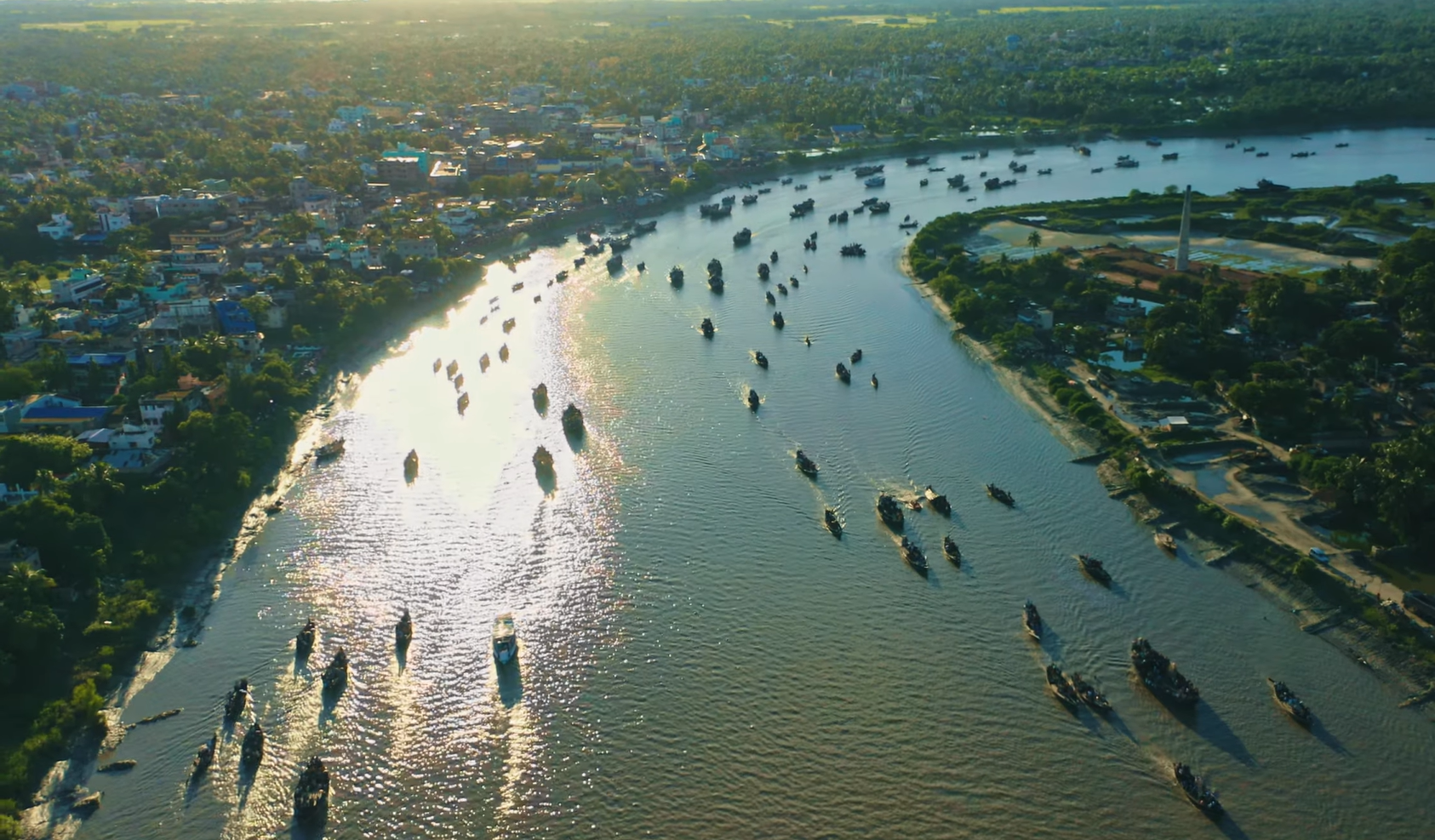
From top left to bottom right (a) Ghee Pukur Dhar Durga Puja committee, Basirhat representing Chapakhana in their pandel; (b) Ballav Rajbari, Dhanyakuria, Basirhat's traditional durga idol showcasing the idol making process; (c) Kishalaya Sangha, Basirhat reflecting the theme of Kashi Bose Lane, Kolkata; (d) Sobuj Sangha, a vibrant puja committee in Basirhat city; (e) Immersion of Durga idols in Ichamati River, Basirhat

==== Celebrations ====
Durga puja is the biggest festival of Basirhat. With more than 100 installations in the city, Basirhat is regarded as one of the major centers of Durga Puja celebrations in West Bengal, reportedly hosting the fourth highest number of puja pandals in the state after Kolkata, Asansol-Durgapur and Siliguri. The City of Basirhat experiences a festive and vibrant atmosphere during Durga Puja, with majestic themed pandals like Kolkata, illuminated streets, and an energetic urban crowd that reflects the cultural enthusiasm. The city attracts significant crowd every year. Bengali media outlets including Anandabazar Patrika, News18 Bangla, and Zee 24 Ghanta have reported Basirhat as a prominent centre of Durga Puja in North 24 Parganas, often referring to it as a cultural gem for its elaborate and thematic celebrations. Prantik Square Sorbojonin is the biggest puja committee of Basirhat, often resembling Kolkata's Maddox Square puja committee because of its atmosphere. This place becomes a meeting point of all ages during the puja days.

==== Traditions ====
For more than 150 years, the Durga idol has been immersed on boats in this city. On the day of Vijayadashami, people usually come in Basirhat to see the immersion festival. The idols and installations have changed in the modern era, but the immersion continues to be done in the Ichamati River by boat according to the ancient tradition. A fair is held on both banks of the river centering on the immersion. The special attraction of this fair is wooden furniture and various wooden items. After Vijayadashami, local government organise a puja carnival with the idols of top 10 puja pandel.

=== Kali Puja and Diwali ===
Basirhat also celebrates Kali Puja and Diwali vibrantly as many club communities also organise this festival properly. Basirhat Dakshina Kali Temple is famous for its unique rituals. This temple's origin dates back more than 300 years back as Raja Krishnachandra established this temple.

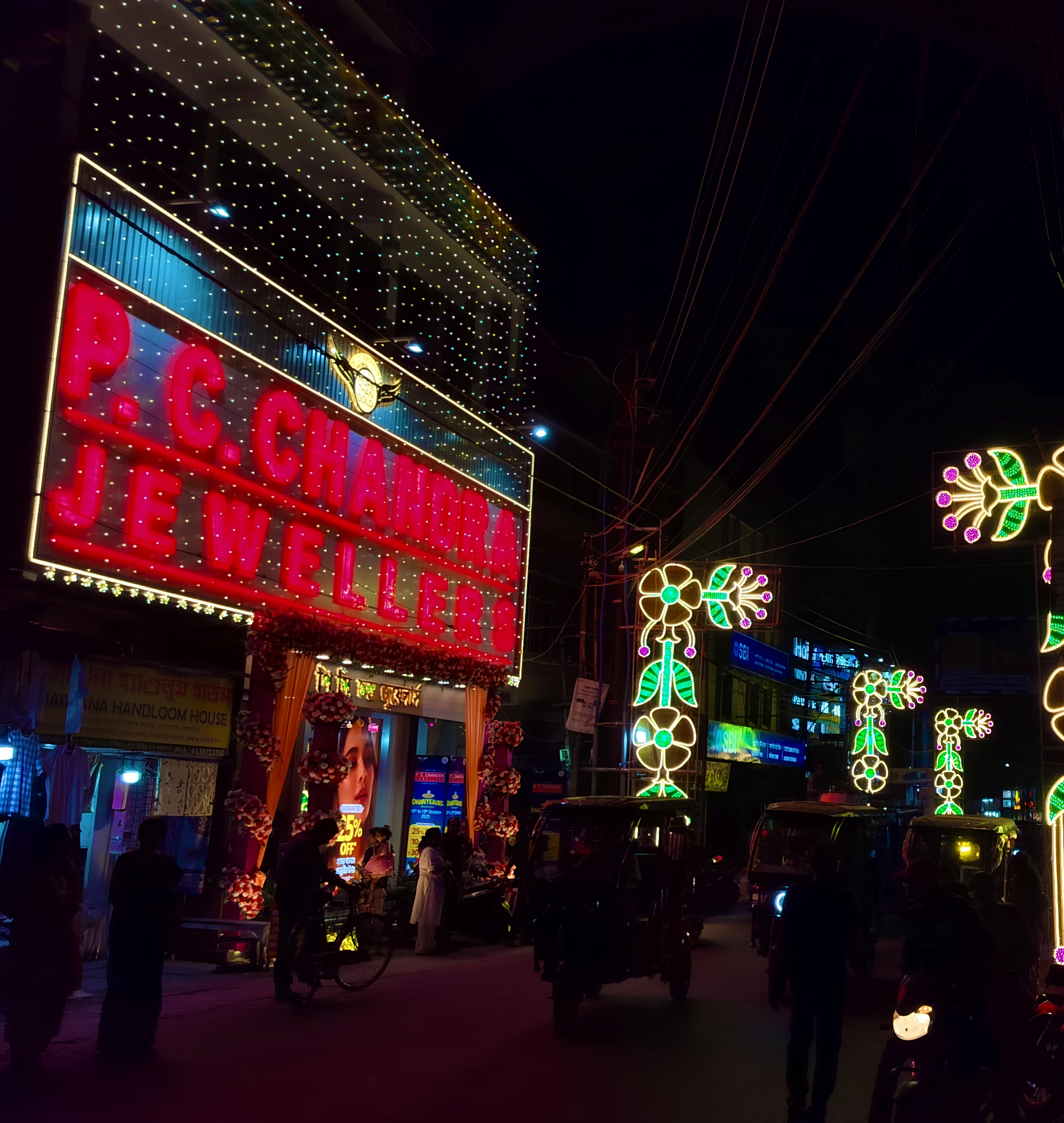
Basirhat is decked up during Dhanteras and Diwali festival.

=== Cultural centers ===
Basirhat has got plenty of cultural and community centers for promoting the art and culture of the city, Rabindra Bhaban is one of them. Located near the Lake Terrace area, many concerts, performances, drama and art events are usually happen during the festive time or on the weekend. In 2017, Basirhat municipality allocated 4 Cr rupees for the further development of Rabindra Bhaban.

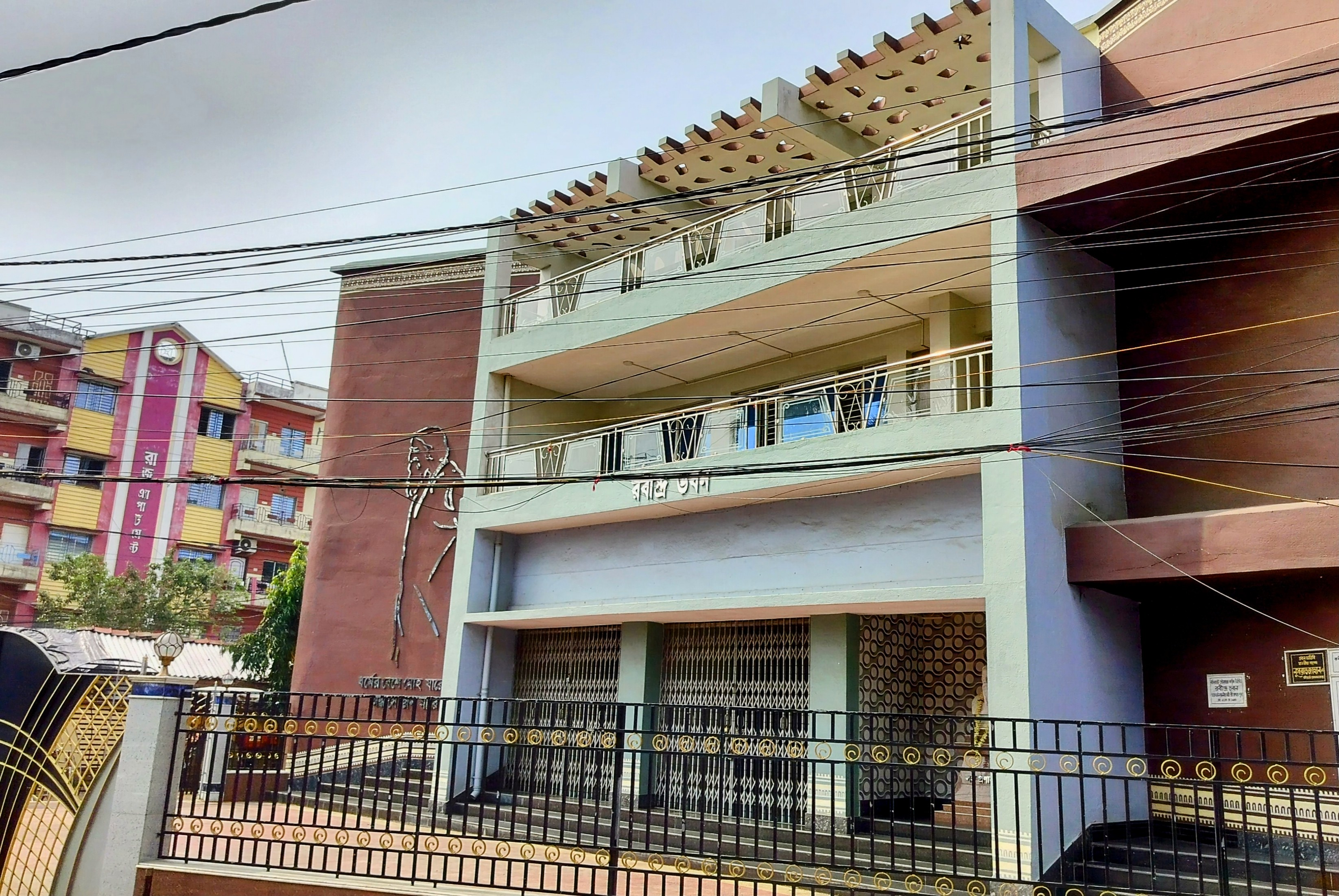
Rabindra Bhaban, a cultural centre of Basirhat city

=== Literature ===
Basirhat is locally known as the hub of little magazines. Many publication agencies publish their books and little magazines every year on the day of Mahalaya, which is known as the first day of durga puja. Every book features local and national articles, literature and art, which usually focus on Bengali literature. Dated back to a thousand years ago, Basirhat is one of the oldest hub of little magazines in India. Currently Basirhat and surrounding areas has more than 100 publications.

== Cuisine ==
Basirhat is famous for its Sandesh (confectionery) or Kachagolla, with many sweet vendors of the local area demanding a Geographical Indication or GI tag for it. This famous Kachagolla is prepared by making curd from cow's milk and mixing it with sugar during other times of the year and jaggery during winter. Historically, it can be seen that the culture of making this Kachagolla in Basirhat is about 400 years old.

== Transport ==
=== Road ===
NH 312 and SH 2 passes through the city. Basirhat is well connected with Barasat, Bongaon, Barrackpore, Kolkata, Kalyani, Krishnanagar and other cities of West Bengal by road.

A ring road is planned around Kolkata to reduce traffic and improve connectivity in the metropolitan area. The eastern part of this road will pass through Basirhat, helping the city become better connected to the rest of the region.

=== Railway ===
Basirhat railway station is the most busiest railway station after Barasat Junction railway station in Barasat-Hasnabad Suburban railway line of Sealdah railway division.

== Infrastructure ==
=== Parks ===
Basirhat has got plenty of green spaces such as Rabindra Saikat Park, Lake Terrace (SurjaKanta Park), Bow Bazar Park, Hari Narayan Ghosh Park, Dinesh Majumder Park, Alok Jharna Park.

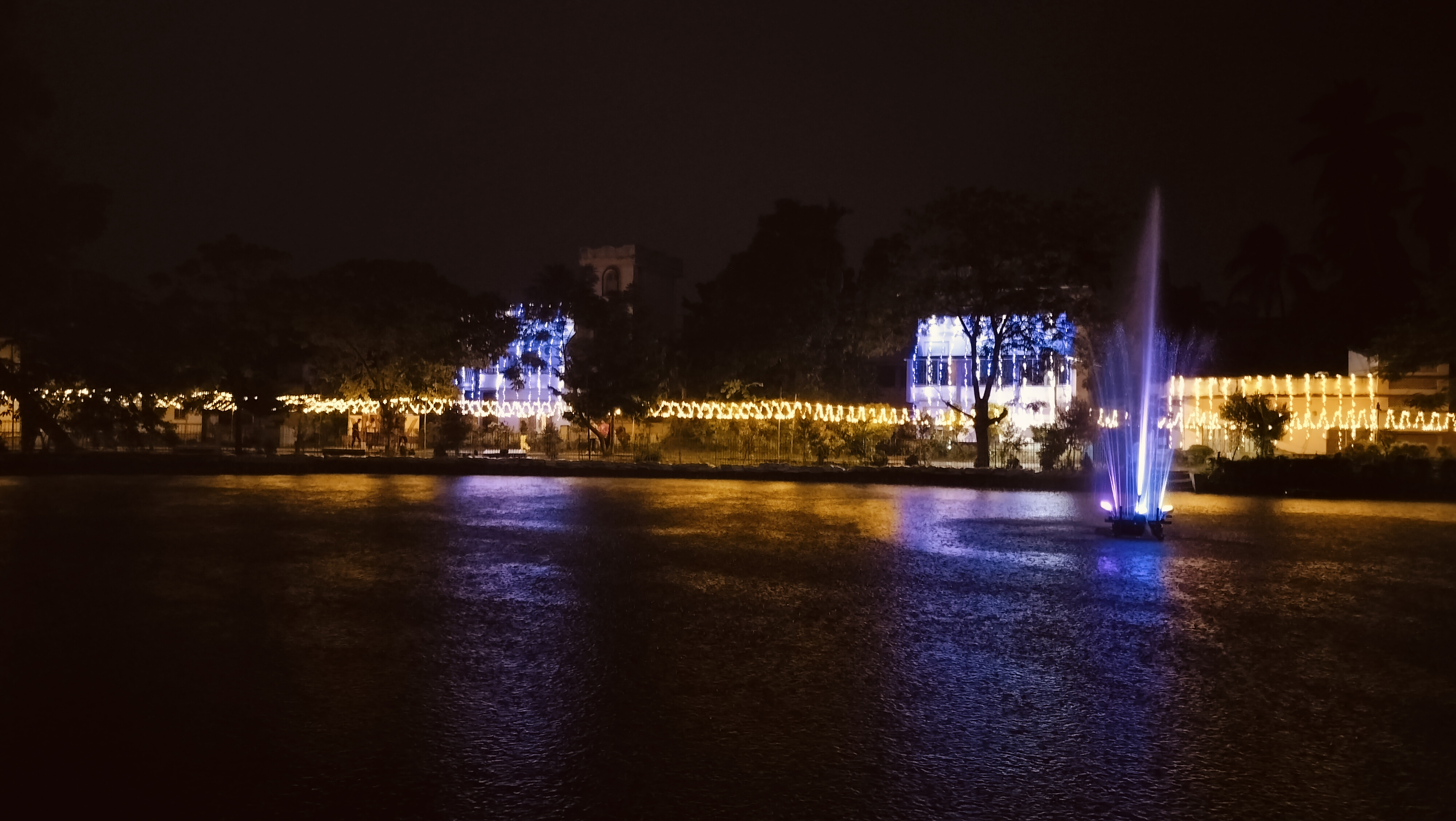
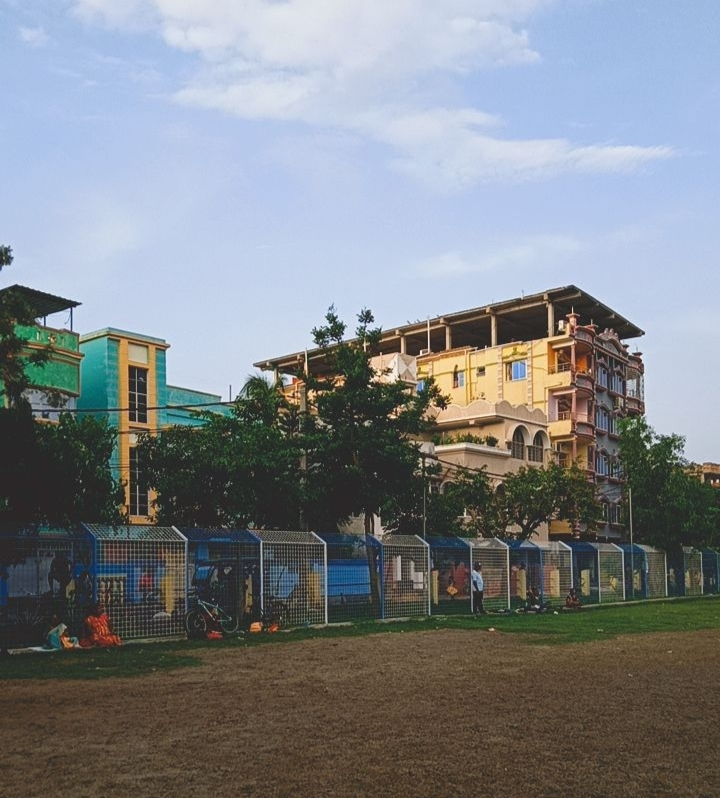
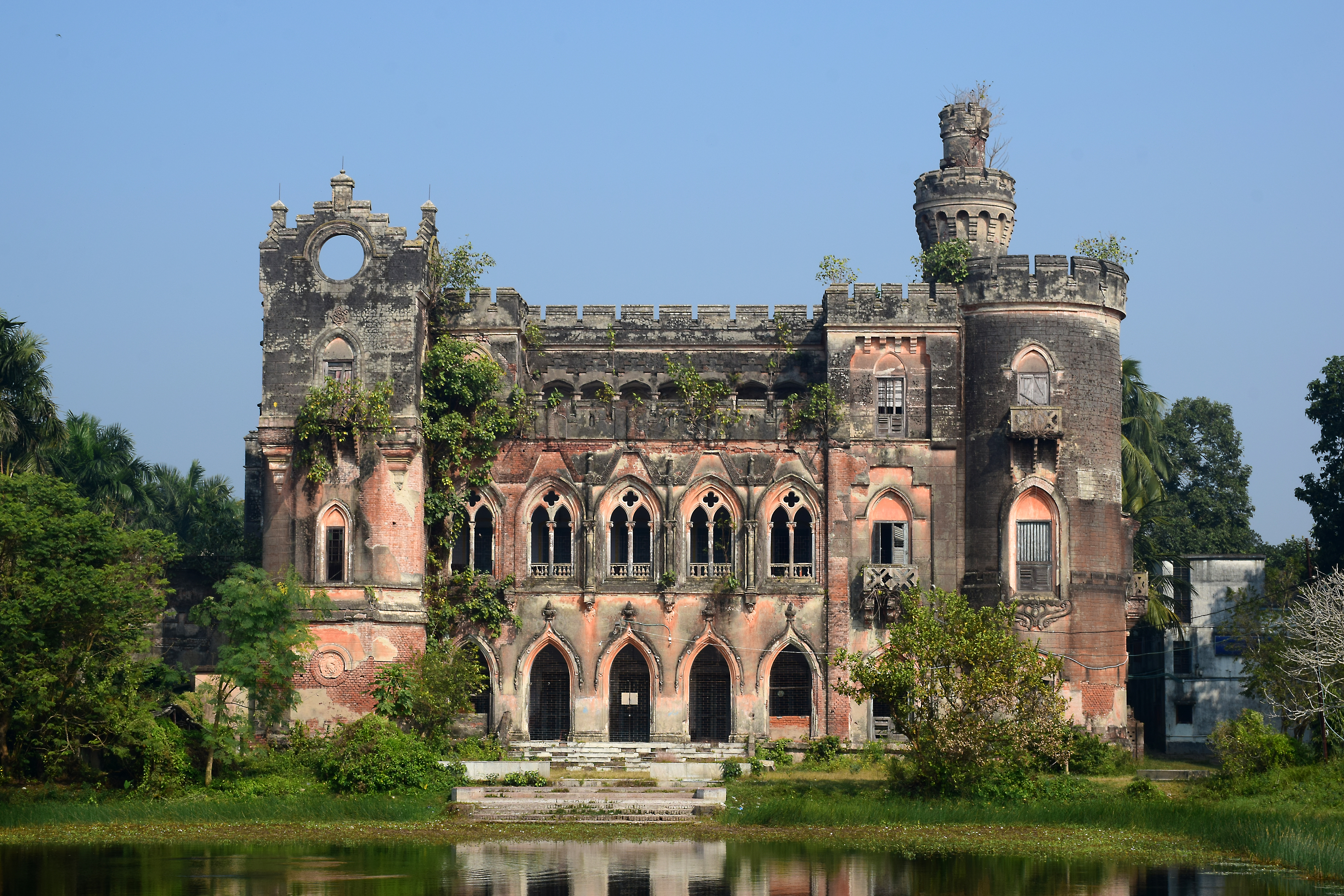
From top to bottom: (a) Lake Terrace, Basirhat City; (b) A neighborhood portraying the environment of Basirhat, West Bengal, India; (c) Gaine Castle in Dhanyakuria, Basirhat II CD Block

=== Shopping and Amenities ===
Basirhat is famous for its shopping street area, extended from city's boatghat area to Bowbazar area via Itinda Road. Recently many National and Multinational brands are opening their stores in Basirhat. Several new shopping malls have been built along the Itinda Road area of Basirhat in recent years.

Another important commercial hub of Basirhat is located in Maitra Bagan area. Many reputable retail stores like Zudio and Reliance Smart Bazaar are operating their stores in this area.

== Civic administration ==
=== Municipality ===
Civic administration is the responsibility of the Basirhat Municipality which is the seventh oldest in West Bengal after that of Kolkata, Uttarpara, Shantipur, Howrah, Krishnanagar, and Burdwan. Basirhat Municipality covers an area of 22.01 km^{2} (8.50 sq mi). It has jurisdiction over the entire city of Basirhat. It is divided into 23 administrative wards.

=== Police station ===
Basirhat police station covers an area of 267 km^{2} and serves a population of 637,538. Basirhat PS has under it Basirhat town outpost and two other outposts at Panitor and Boatghat. The police district has a 22 km border, out which 14 km is land border and 8 km is riverine border. 11 km of the border remains unfenced. Basirhat PS has jurisdiction over Basirhat municipal area and Basirhat I CD Block.

Around half of the 4,095 km long India-Bangladesh border has been fenced and vigil along the border has been tightened up. As of 2017, Cattle smuggling across the border was unofficially estimated to be a Rs. 4,000 crore business, half of it across the Basirhat border and the balance through Malda and Murshidabad.

In 2017, The Sunday Guardian reported, "The crackdown by the Border Security Force (BSF) on the illegal, but lucrative, business of cow smuggling along the India-Bangladesh border in West Bengal's North 24 Parganas district, resulted in immense resentment among a section of the area's minority community." This culminated in the communal flare-up in the state's Basirhat sub-division earlier this month. A source close to the state's ruling Trinamool Congress told The Sunday Guardian over phone, "Cow smuggling to Bangladesh, through the riverine border in Basirhat, Taki and other adjoining areas, has taken a hit as the BSF has become very strict and is maintaining a constant vigil. This has hurt the locals, who were earning crores from these illegal activities. Rendered jobless, they blamed the situation on the majority community."

=== Communal Incidents ===
A massive riot broke down in Basirhat, Baduria and adjoining areas in July 2017 because of a Facebook post. It is a divide that has opened up, after that Facebook post showing "objectionable images" which was widely circulated, following which a mob vandalised shops and homes, and set fire to vehicles, triggering retaliatory violence. Several temples got attacked in the region. Police got attacked with stones, which were thrown by the mobs.Central troops were deployed in the area, when the clashes got violent. Muslim mobs set upon shops and houses belonging to Hindus in Basirhat, Baduria, Swarupnagar, and Taki. Rath Yatras at several places were attacked. Violent clashes were triggered between the two communities of Basirhat city area. The Union government deployed four Border Security Force (BSF) companies containing a total of 400 personnel to check the violence in the region. Section 144 was imposed while the internet services were suspended. In retaliatory attacks on 6 July, Hindu mobs attacked a dargah and vandalised shops and houses in addition to clashing with the police. The office of a local TMC leader also comes under attack. On 7 July, several Hindu temples were attacked by a Muslim mob of about 70-90 people. They also allegedly attacked and harassed Hindu families. The British Broadcasting Corporation (BBC News) published in an article about the Basirhat violence. In that article, BBC tried to postulated all causes which caused the riot.

=== CD block HQ ===
The headquarters of Basirhat I CD block are located at Basihat.

== Education ==
=== Colleges ===
- Basirhat College was established in 1947. Affiliated with the West Bengal State University, it offers honours courses in Bengali, English, Sanskrit, philosophy, political science, history, geography, education, accountancy, mathematics, physics, chemistry, botany, zoology, physiology and economics. It also offers general courses in arts, science and commerce, and a post-graduate course in Bengali.

=== Schools ===
Basirhat municipal area has a total of 130 educational institutions across different levels. These include 11 pre-primary schools, 59 primary schools, 1 junior high school, 8 secondary schools, and 9 higher secondary schools.

==== Bengali Medium Schools ====
Basirhat has a several Bengali Medium Schools including:

- Basirhat High School - In 1929, Basirhat High School was visited by Netaji Subhas Chandra Bose, one of India's most prominent freedom fighters. His visit inspired students and teachers to participate in the freedom movement and spread awareness about national unity and self-reliance.

== Healthcare ==
The Basirhat District & Super Specialty Hospital under The Health & Family Welfare Department of the State Government of West Bengal has been given the responsibility of conserving and emerging the health care facility within Basirhat sub-division & its surrounding catchment area since 1965, Basirhat District Hospital & Super Specialty Hospital caters health services amongst 22.7 lakhs populations covering 1777 km^{2}. In the year 2013, the 250 bedded Basirhat Sub-Division Hospital augmented to 300 Bedded District Hospital and later on, in the year 2017 the District Hospital increased with additional 300 beds with introduction of Super Specialty Hospital, now Basirhat District Hospital & Super Specialty Hospital with 600 beds.

In 2024, a government medical college was approved for Basirhat which will be known as Basirhat Medical College. According to the Chief Medical Health Officer, construction work is expected to begin by 2026, aiming to improve healthcare and medical education in the region.

Basirhat is one of the areas where ground water is affected by arsenic contamination.

== Notable people ==
- Bibhutibhushan Bandyopadhyay
- Rajendra Nath Mookerjee
- Dipendu Biswas
- Saptarshi Banerjee
- Tapan Bandyopadhyay
- Rafikul Islam Mondal
- Monami Ghosh
- Manoj Mitra
- Mihir Bose (footballer)
- Biswanath Basu
- Manoranjan Sur
- Samik Bhattacharya
- Renu Chakravartty
- Amar Mitra (writer)
- Titumir
- Dinesh Chandra Majumder
- Muhammad Shahidullah

== See also ==
- Lake Terrace, Basirhat
- Basirhat district
- North 24 Parganas
- Durga Puja
- Cities and towns in West Bengal
- Barasat
- Barrackpore
