= Terracotta temples of West Bengal =

Temples in West Bengal, India

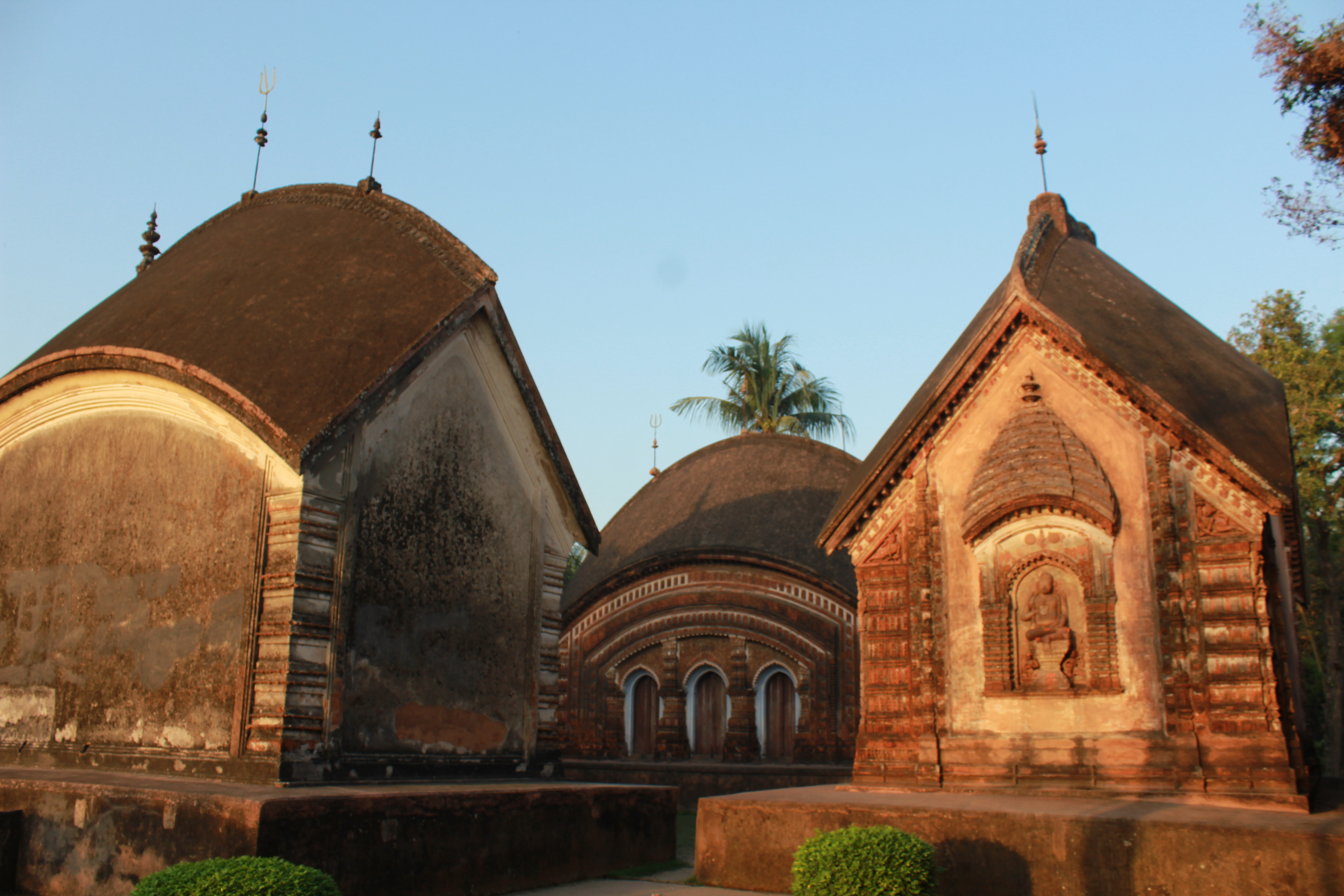
Char Bangla group of terracotta temples of Azimganj in Murshidabad district of West Bengal

Radh Bengal is a region in West Bengal also known as the Temple Town. This region consists of arrays of temples in varying sizes and devoted to different gods and goddess but the common thread unifying this group is that the temples are constructed in terracotta. The region consists of following districts Birbhum, Bankura, Burdwan, Purulia and parts of Murshidabad. The construction style originated in 16th century and lasted till the 19th century. This period is also referred as a golden age of temple in West Bengal. Reason for development of this construction technique was the rich red laterite soil of the region and lack of construction worthy stone. The skill of creating daily objects from like vessels, pottery, seal and toys evolved into a construction technique in the time of need. These temples are baked terracotta panels or bricks. This particular style spread outside the present day West Bengal as well, to Jharkhand, Bihar, Assam and Tripura.

== History ==
Religious landscape of Bengal was dominated by Nagar style temple till 12th century and after that few centuries were dedicated to Islamic religious building till the 16th century. After the throne was ascended by Bir Hambir, king of the Malla Dynasty of Mallabhum and he became the disciple of Acharya Srinivas, which led to establishment of a Vaishnava culture. Establishment of the Vaishnav movement, especially around Radha-Krishna that lead to the construction of terracotta temples in the region. Muslim rulers during this period were religiously tolerant and allowed the other religions to flourish which contributed in development of Vaishnav culture and construction of magnificent terracotta temple.

=== Story of Bir Hambir embracing Vaishnavism ===
According to the treaties of the Prem-vilasa of Nityananda Das alias Balaram Das and the Bhakti-ratnakara of Narahari Chakravarti, Bir Hambir was a wicked king, who robbed Acharya Srinivas and his devotees while they were on their way to Gaur from Vrindavan. Acharya Srinivas did not give up and stood strong, he persuaded the King read to Bhagavad. This experience transformed him and motivate him to become a follower of Vaishnavism.

== Construction technique ==
Construction of the terracotta temple consists of a brick masonry core. In case of the walls, the brick core is made of horizontally laid bricks followed by a layer of lime plaster, on which baked terracotta panels are then affixed. Bricks are also laid horizontally on stretchers for roofing system of vaults and domes. For construction of arches the bricks are cut out is tapering manner to form voussoirs, the curved brick also aided in making vaults and swelled cornices as well. Major construction materials were fired bricks and lime mortar. Lime mortar was created by processing snail shells and for roofing a very hard traditional plaster was used. In some cases the decorative terracotta panels were embedded in the wall. Different shapes of bricks are also used in making contours and surface modulations in facade and contours.

== Architectural style ==
Terracotta temples is divided into four categories as per their form composition and structure style and not the construction style - Chala, Ratna, Deul and Dalan. The temples of pre-Muslim period can be called tall curvilinear rekha deul. Popularly seen hut style temples have two variations Chala and Bangla style, this style is influenced from huts of Bengal, commonly known a Bengal Roof. Chala temple consists of a sloping roof joined at curvilinear edges and ending in arched cornices, there are further variations in the style in which the number of chalas are increased or their formation is modified. Do Chala style has a roof sloping on two sides with a ridge at the top, another style is Jor Bangla which is composed of twin do chala attached to each other. Further modification of do chala is char chala which is a four sided sloping roof and then ath chala which is a char chala mounted with smaller char chala. Plan of these temple are generally simple, composed of a square or rectangle.

Ground floor plan remains a simple square or rectangle in Ratna style as well, the differentiation is seen in the case of the roof. The roofing system is composed of a flat roof with pinnacle tower on top, each tower is considered as a temple and are generally present in odd numbers. Name of the typology changes as per the number of towers such as ek-ratna (single-spired) and pancha-ratna (five-spired) and naba-ratna (nine-spired). Maximum number of towers or spires seen are twenty five.

=== Theme and motifs of ornamentation ===
The region was under the influence of Vaishnaba Padabolies and Rasashastra. In accordance to the said influence, we find that the walls are adorned with plaques depicting Krishna katha and Ramakatha, providing historical influence about Chaitanyadev and the Bhakti movement. The ornamentation is not concentrated just on the main body of the temple but can be observed on pillar and niches as well.

The motifs depicted on the temples are from four categories plants, animals, solar system and geometric. Lotus is one of the most common occurring plant motif, in both bud and blooming stage, surrounded by other flowers. Motifs related to animals represented by swan, peacock, fish, tigers, lions, monkeys, elephants, horses, ostrich birds etc. Sun moon and stars also occur frequently.Geometrical motifs are seen on horizontal bands with composition including basic shapes like square, rectangle, triangle, half-circle and lines.

=== Iconography of Krishna Katha in terracotta temples ===
Common representation of Krishna in the temples of Baranagar, Murshidabad is a figure which appears repeatedly in a certain posture. Frequently both his hands are up like holding on to a flute, occasionally the flute is held in one hand, his legs are either crossed or straight and sometimes in a dancing position. The figure is generally surrounded by one or more female attendants and at times with cows. The female attendants could be gopis or Radha, also the scene is generally represented under a tree or inside a small tent. Radha and Krishna together are generally represented in dancing posture, at times both are playing flutes. In some cases Krishna has his arm around Radha, while she rests her head on his shoulder. Similar to the above depictions the scene is composed under a tree or inside a small tent. These representation can be mostly seen on mostly all parts of the building including pillars, wall, corners and base frieze.

== Famous terracotta temples ==
=== Rasa Mancha Temple ===
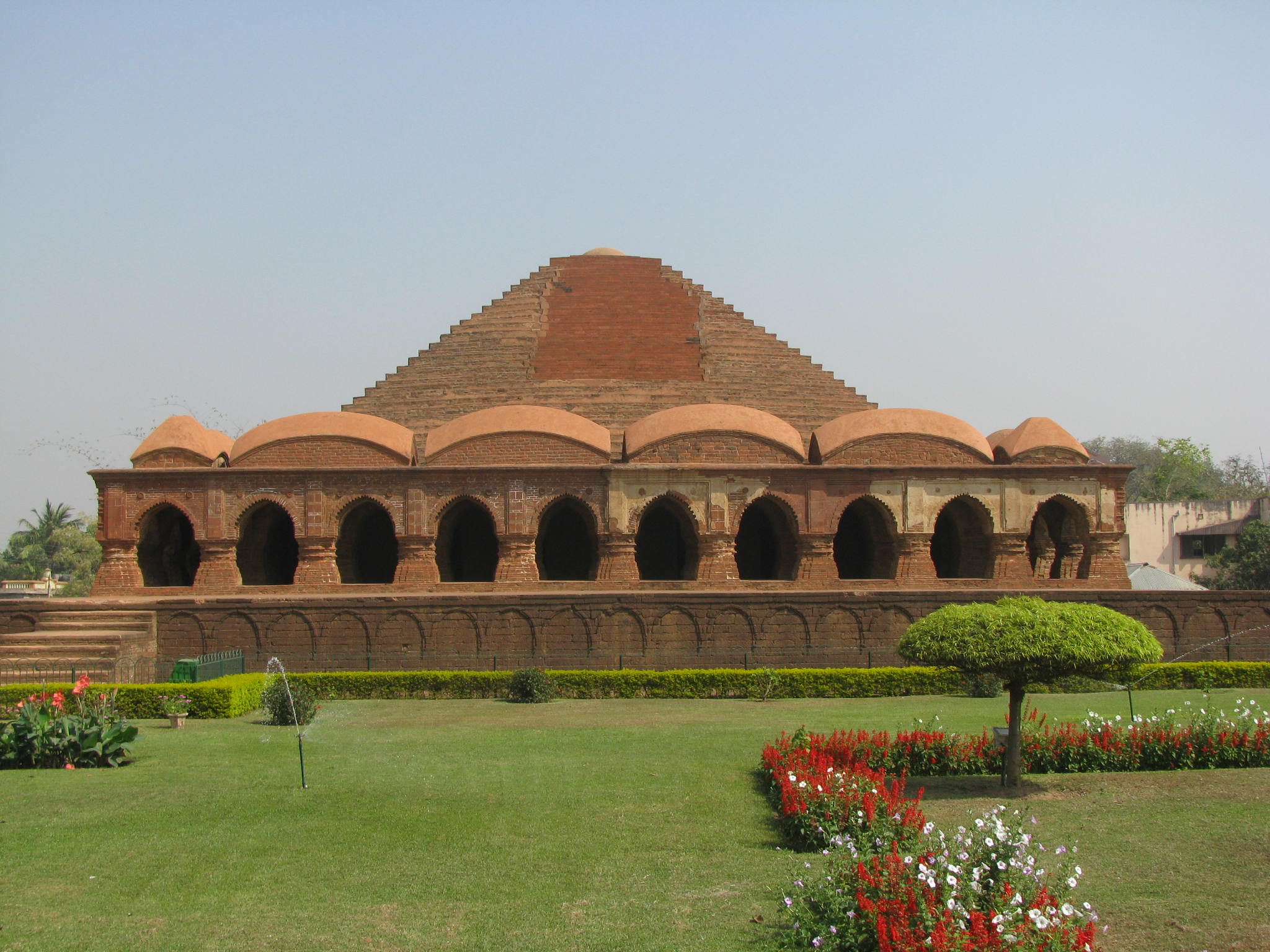
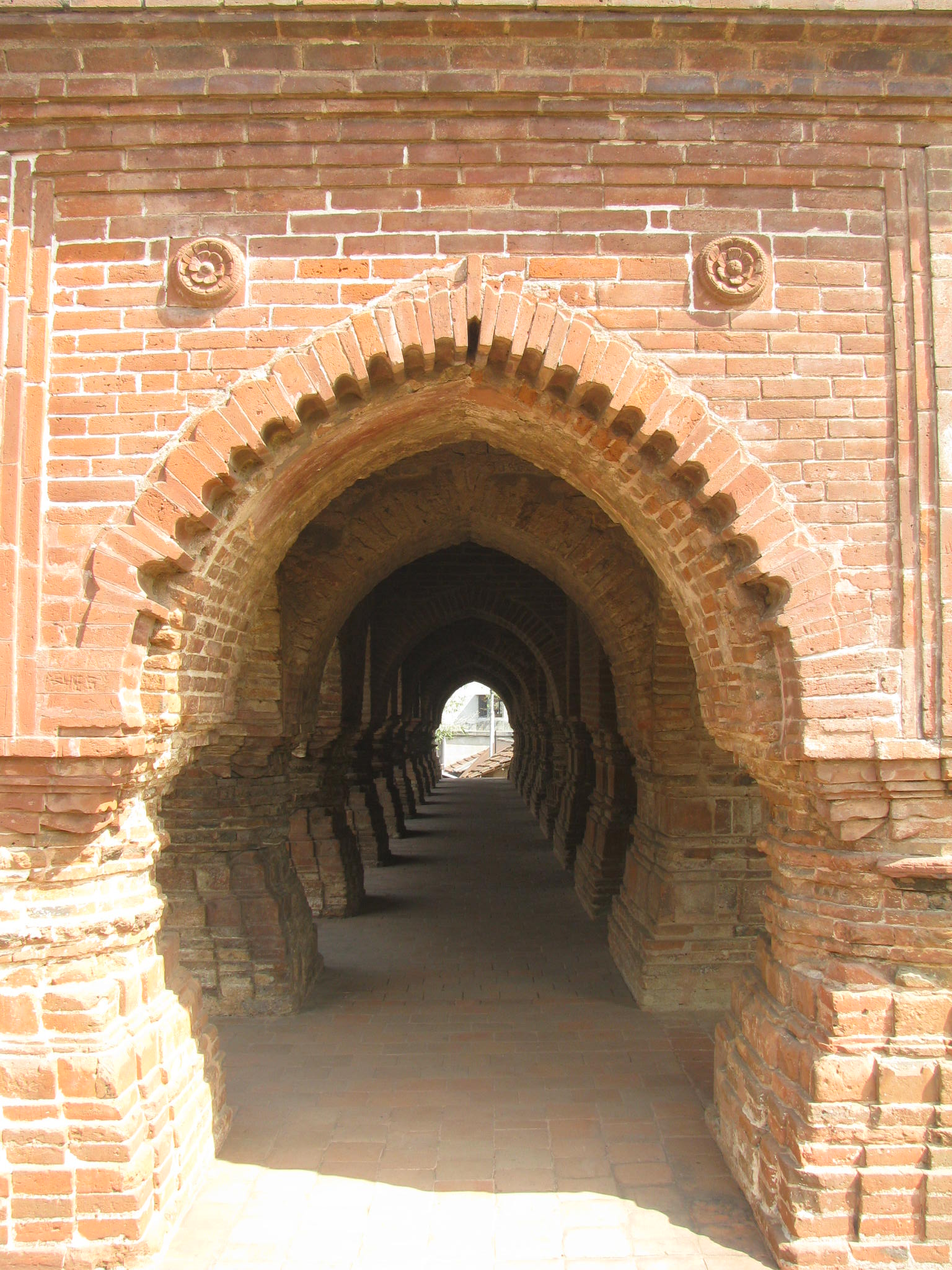
Left: A view of the Rasa-Mancha with the courtyard, Right: Gateway with lotus motif.

This is one of the earliest and most dignified temple constructed King Bir Hambir in 1600 after he adopted Vaishnav culture in Bishnupur. The temple sits on a square plan and the roof in the centre is in a pyramid form, four corners of the arcade are topped with a small challa roofs and intermediate portions are mounted with domical structure. Each side of the square plan measures 24.5 metres and the height of the structure excluding the roof is 10.7 metres, built on 1.5 metre high plinth. The temple consists of 108 gates adorned with lotus and mangol ghat motifs, lotus is also seen in other parts of temple. There is a prominent representation of Sri Chaitanyadev doing namaskar, other images depicted include goddess Saraswati and tribal women.

=== Jorbangla Temple ===
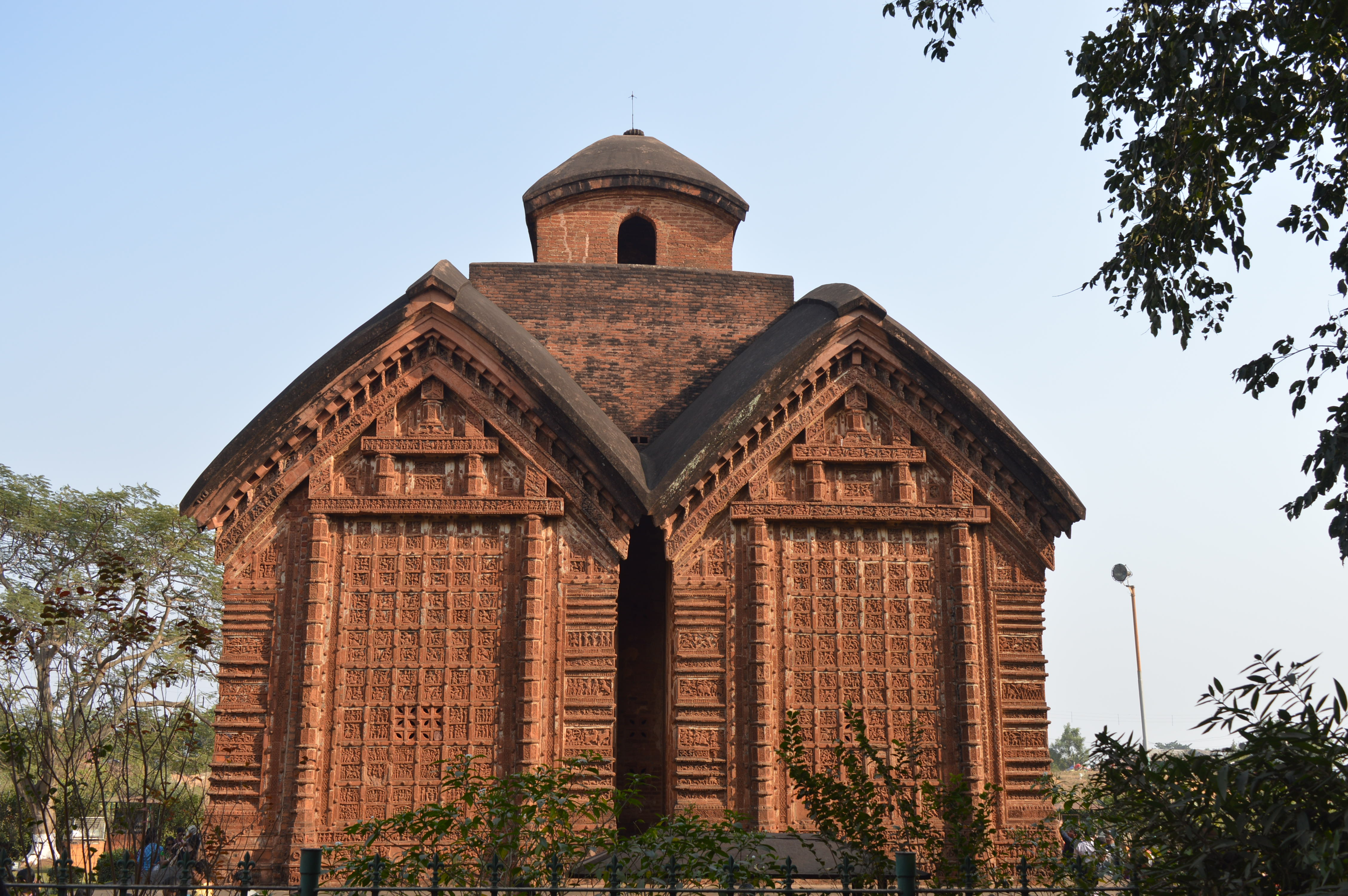
Jod Bangla Terracotta Temple, Bishnupur, West Bengal

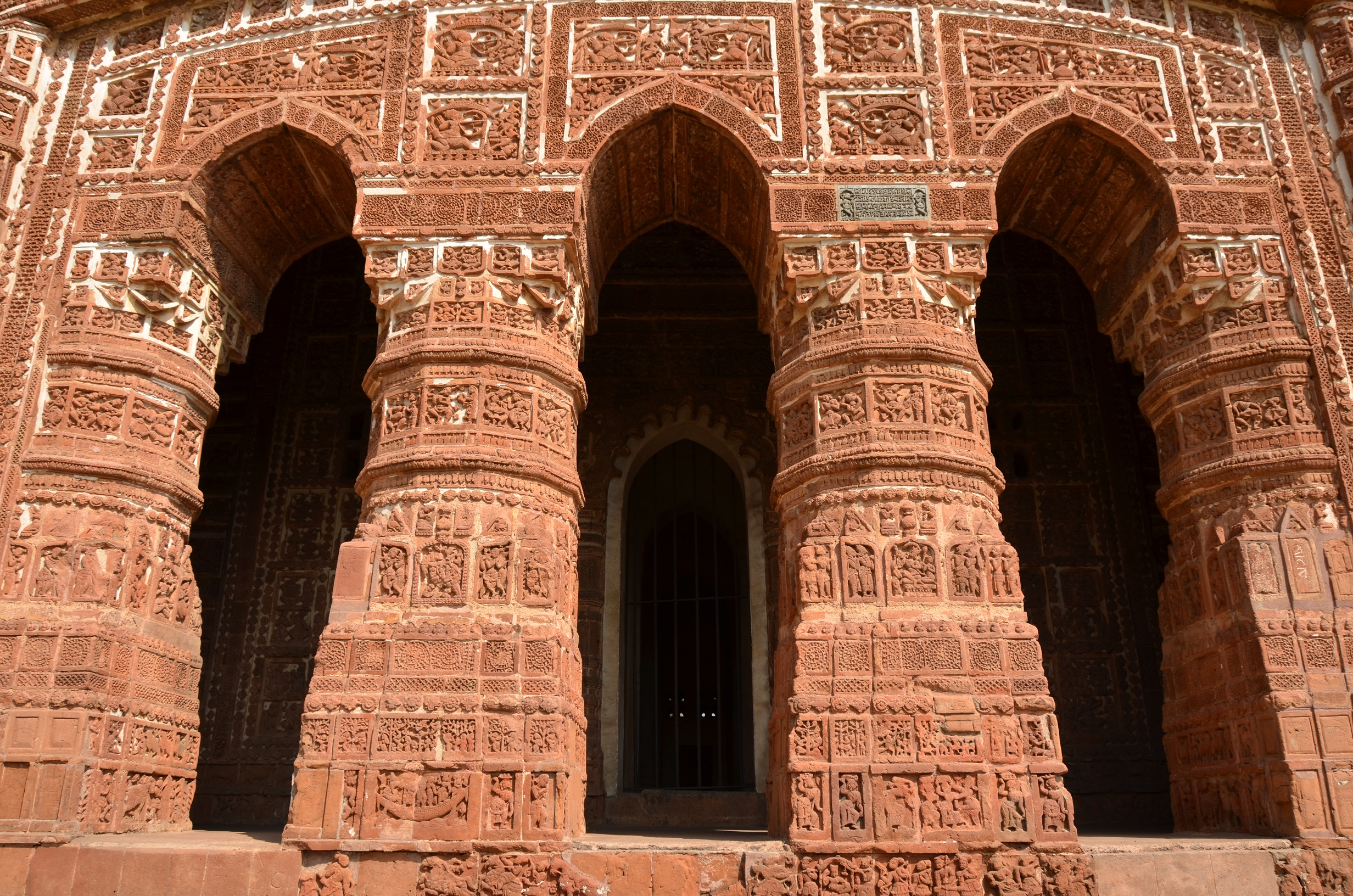
Intricate terracotta temples depicting mythological stories on the facade of Jor Bangla Temple, Bishnupur

This is a prominent example of Jor Bangla roofing described in the architecture section. This temple is also located in Bishnupur and was constructed by Raghunath Singh I in 1665. Plan of the temple is almost a square measuring 11.8metres by 11.7 with a height o 10.7 meters. The temple is profusely decorated with terracotta panels depicting scenes of Mahabharata, Ramayana and Krishna Lila.. One of the panels reveal Raghunath I as son of Bir Hambir.

== See also ==
- List of temples in Bishnupur
- Maluti temples
- Bankura horse
- Terracotta
- Architecture of Bengal

== Bibliography ==
- McCutchion, David J. (1967). The Temples of Bankura District, Calcutta: Writers Workshop.
- McCutchion, David J. (1972). Late Medieval Temples of Bengal, Kolkata: The Asiatic Society, 15
- Dasgupta, Prodosh. (1971). Temple Terracotta of Bengal, New Delhi: Crafts Museum.
- George, Michell (ed.). (1983). Brick Temples of Bengal, New Jersey: Princeton University Press.
