= Lake Terrace, Basirhat =

Neighbourhood in Basirhat, West Bengal, India

Lake Terrace
- Neighbourhood
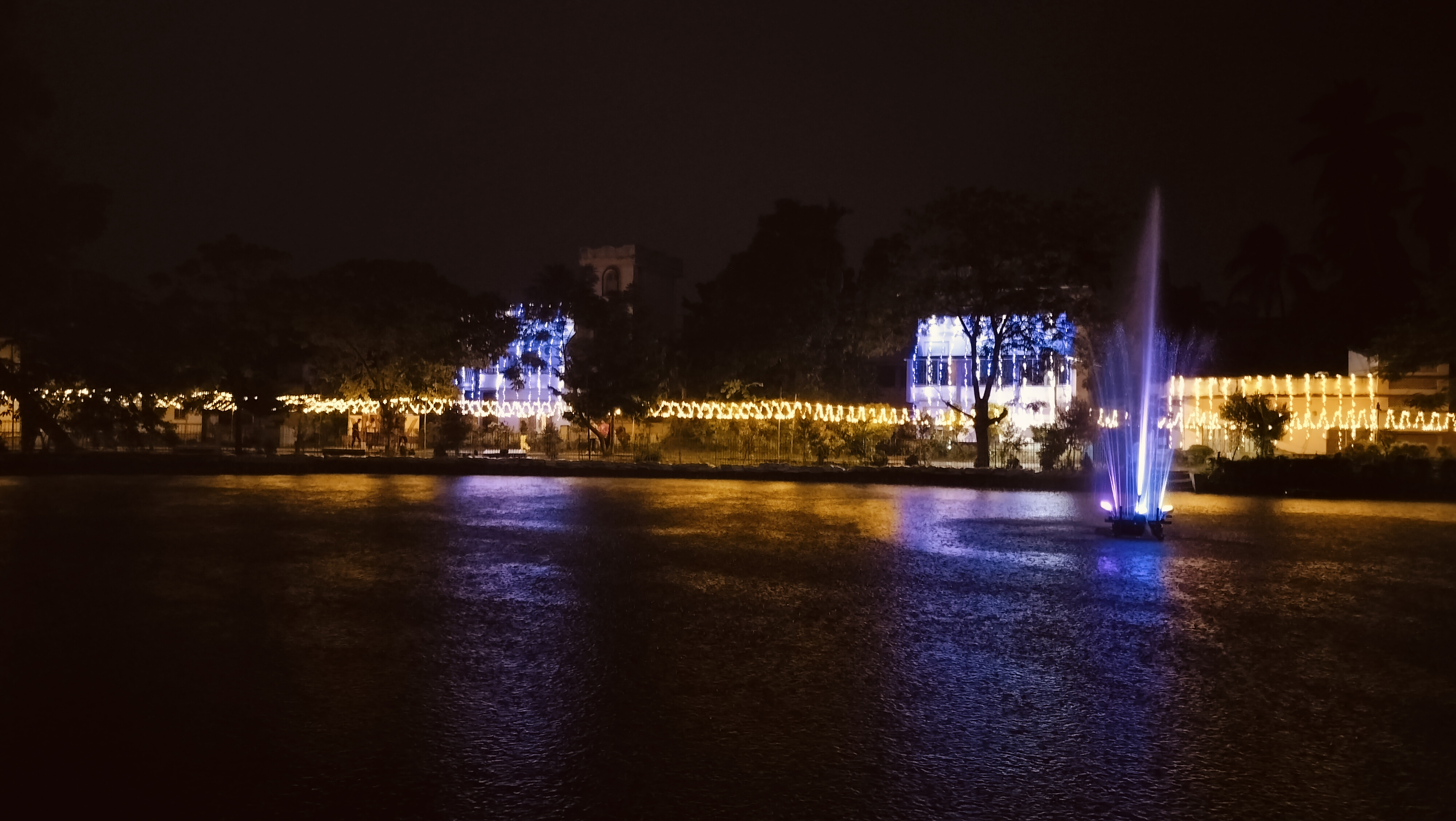
- Lake Terrace, Basirhat City
- Interactive map of Lake Terrace
- Coordinates: 22°39′39″N 88°52′09″E
- Country: India
- State: West Bengal
- Division: Presidency division
- District: North 24 Parganas district
- Railway Station: Basirhat railway station

Government
  - Type: Municipality
  - Body: Basirhat Municipality

Population (2025)
  - Total: 1,450

Languages
  - Official: Bengali, English

Literacy
  - Literacy rate: 99.6%
- Time zone: UTC+5:30 (IST)
- PIN: 743411
- Telephone code: +91 33
- Vehicle registration: WB
- Lok Sabha constituency: Basirhat
- Vidhan Sabha constituency: Basirhat Dakshin

Lake Terrace is a neighborhood of the city of Basirhat in the Basirhat subdivision of North 24 Parganas district. It is a prominent residential locality. It falls under the jurisdiction of Basirhat Municipal Authority.

== Overview ==
Basirhat Lake Terrace area is one of the busiest neighborhood of Basirhat. It includes the area of S.N. Banerjee Road, Rabindra Bhaban Chowmatha, Lake View Park (SurjaKanta park) and Kabi Bhujanga Dhar Road. Byampith Pathagar, which is also known as Lake Terrace Durga Puja, which is quite famous pujo committee of Basirhat due to its location. Freedom fighter Dinesh Chandra Majumder established Byampith Pathagar in 1931. During Durga Puja, people basically the young generation hangs out in Lake View Park, creating a adda zone (Casual hangout zone). Rabindra Bhaban also located in the Lake Terrace area, where all cultural activities such as art exhibition, dance competition, concerts usually happen.

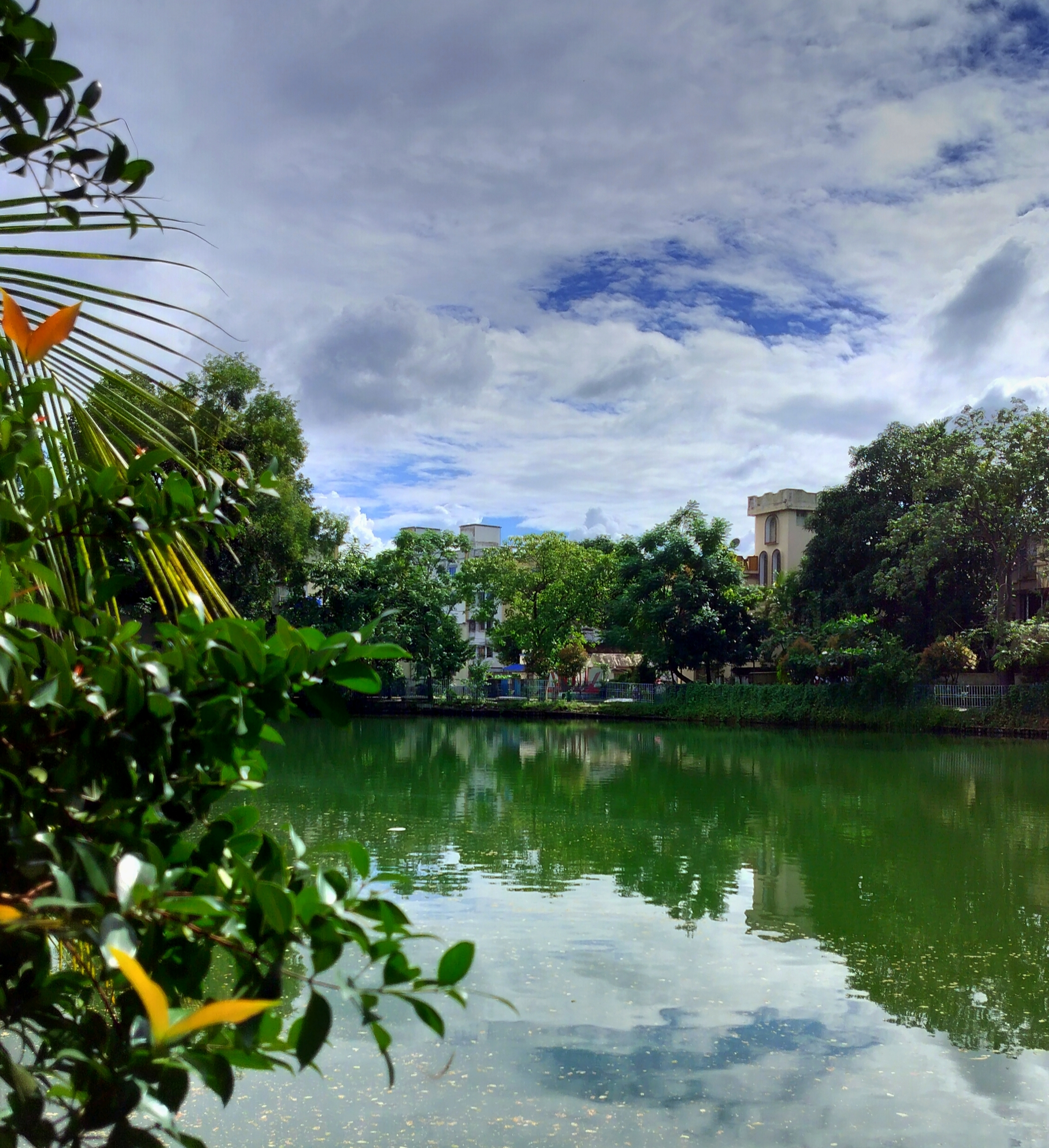
Lake Terrace (Surjakanta Lake View Park), Basirhat

== Civic Administration ==
=== Post Office ===
Lake Terrace has a delivery sub post office located in the Basirhat Bazar area with the PIN of 743411.

=== Police station ===
Lake Terrace area falls under Basirhat police station, which operates under the jurisdiction of Basirhat Police District.
