= Basirhat Dakshina Kali Temple =

Hindu temple in Basirhat, West Bengal

- বসিরহাট দক্ষিণা কালী মন্দির

Religion
- Affiliation: Hinduism
- Deity: Goddess Kali (Dakshina Kali)

Location
- Location: Sangrampur, North 24 Parganas, West Bengal, India
- Interactive map of Basirhat Dakshina Kali Temple
- Coordinates: 22.666374°N 88.870495°E

Architecture
- Type: Traditional Bengali temple architecture

Website
- [Official website URL]

Basirhat Dakshina Kali Temple, locally known as Sangrampur Kalibari, is a historic Hindu temple dedicated to Goddess Kali, situated in Sangrampur, North 24 Parganas, West Bengal, India. It is one of the prominent Shakti Peethas in the region, known for its spiritual significance and cultural heritage.

== History ==
The temple traces its origins over 300 years ago. According to local legend, Raja Krishna Chandra Roy, a zamindar of the region, received a divine vision instructing him to build a shrine for Goddess Kali in Sangrampur. He donated land and constructed the temple with the assistance of the local community. Over centuries, the temple evolved from a modest straw-thatched structure to the present-day edifice, reflecting traditional Bengali temple architecture.

== Architecture ==
The temple showcases classic Bengali architectural elements, including a high platform, curved roofs, and decorative terracotta panels. The sanctum sanctorum houses the idol of Goddess Kali in her Dakshina Kali form.

== Religious significance ==
The temple is considered a powerful spiritual center. Rituals at the temple follow traditional practices, including offerings, chanting of mantras, and community feasts. Here, the traditional offering includes white rice served with moong dal, colocasia (kachu) stems, and a distinctive preparation of jackfruit (echor) and shrimp (chingri). This unique combination is a hallmark of the temple's rituals, reflecting its deep-rooted cultural heritage.

== Accessibility ==
The temple is about 1 km from Basirhat city. It is accessible by bus, auto, e-rickshaw and private vehicles. The nearest railway station is Basirhat railway station, well-connected to Kolkata and other major cities in West Bengal.

== See also ==
- Dakshineswar Kali Temple
- Kalighat Kali Temple
- Kali Puja
