= Titumir Rebellion =

Barasat rebellion
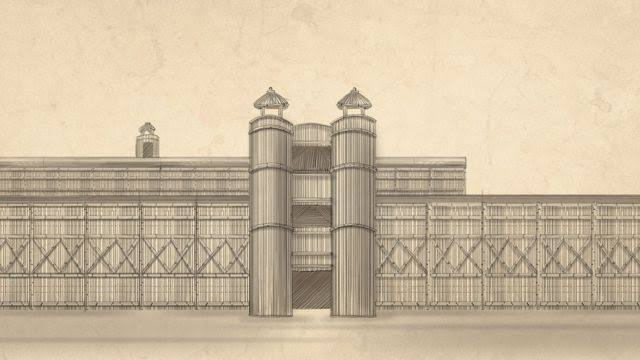
- A depiction of Titumir's Bamboo Fort
Date	1830–1831
Location	Narikelbaria
Result	British victory

Belligerents
British East India Company	Tariqah-i-Muhammadiya

Commanders and leaders
Major Scott; Lieutenant Shakespeare; Major Sutherland	Titumir †; Golam Masum (executed)

Strength
Over 1,000 (including policemen)	500 (poorly armed)

Casualties and losses
Heavy	50 dead, 800 arrested

Titumir Rebellion (Bengali: তিতুমীর বিদ্রোহ) also known as Barasat Rebellion (বারাসাত বিদ্রোহ) was a resistance from local Muslim fighters in Bengal who had declared "Jihad" against British rule. The movement began in 1830, led by Titumir. It occurred after several armed clashes between British forces and local Mujahideen occurred.

== Beginning of the movement ==
It began as an Islamic revivalist movement. Titumir's actions were resulting as people getting influenced by his Tariqah-i-Muhammadiya movement. Titumir had decreased performances like worshipping graves, and other Bid'ah.

== Conflict with native zamindars ==
In June 1830, Krishnadeva Rai, the Zamindar of Punra — in some sources, alternately described as the Talukdar of Sarfarazpur — imposed an annual tax similar to jizya on all bearded Muslims which was caused by On Titumir's advice, the peasants refused to pay and an enraged Krishnadeva led a levy of armed men on a spree of arson, even destroying a local mosque. The Muslims reciprocated but the melee remained inconclusive. Complaints were filed at the Baduria police station by both sides and eventually, the subdivisional magistrate of Barasat dismissed the issue but only after getting a declaration from the peasants about committing to peace.

Buoyed up by the lack of any punishment for Krishnadeva, fellow Zamindars — Ramnarayan Nag Chaudhuri of Taragonia and Guru Prasad Chowdhury of Nagarpur — instituted similar tax-regime on their subjects and imprisoned dissenters. The peasants organised themselves and sued the Zamindars but to little avail. This led Titumir to advocate for a full-fledged armed resistance against what he felt to be the nexus of Zamindars and Company. Atis Dasgupta, a scholar of peasant rebellions in early Colonial India, notes that here onward, what was essentially a socio-religious agitation against misrule of Hindu zamindars morphed into a political-economic class-struggle against British rule.

== End of the movement ==
Titumir would make a last stand against the British by creating a bamboo fortress. However the British defeated and killed him during the siege. The political environment changed in the mid-nineteenth century, when a section of the Muslim intelligentsia began to rethink about the unequal war against the British. Karamat Ali Jaunpuri came up with an alternative theory of peaceful co-existence with the British rulers and the Tariqah-i-Muhammadiya movement gradually subsided.
