= Titumir =

Bengali mujahid (1782-1831)

Titumir Syed Mir Nasir Ali
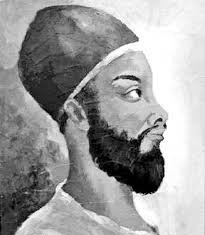
- Titumir, Bengali Anti-Colonial Revolutionary
- Title: Mujaddid; Hafiz; Mujahid; Shaykh; Badshah

Personal life
- Born: 27 January 1782 Chandpur, Bengal Presidency, British India
- Died: 19 November 1831 (aged 49) Narikelbaria, Bengal Presidency, British India
- Main interest(s): Islamic revivalism, Separatism, Jihad, Fiqh
- Known for: Titumir's rebellion
- Other name: Titumir

Religious life
- Religion: Sunni Islam
- Jurisprudence: Hanafi
- Movement: Tariqah-i-Muhammadiya

Senior posting
- Influenced by: Sayyid Ahmad Barelvi, Shah Ismail Dehlvi, Shah Jalal
- Influenced: Almost all Bengali-speaking Separatist and Islamic Revivalist movements (including Bangladesh Islami Chhatrashibir, Intifada Bangladesh, Mukti Bahini, Bangladesh Liberation war, Bangladesh Jamaat-e-Islami)

Syed Mir Nisar Ali (27 January 1782 – 19 November 1831), better known as Titumir, was a Bengali Muslim Revolutionary in British India who developed a strand of Islamic revivalism, sometimes also for Bengali nationalism coupled with agrarian and political consciousness. He is famed for having built a large bamboo fort to resist the British, which passed into Bengali Muslim folk legend.

Titumir was ranked number 11 in the BBC's poll of the Greatest Bengali of All Time.

== Early life ==
Syed Mir Nisar Ali was born on 27 January 1782 (14 Magh 1182), in the village of Haidarpur or Chandpur per some sources to Syed Mir Hasan Ali and Abidah Ruqayyah Khatun. The family traced their lineage to Mir Sayyid Shahadat Ali who had migrated to Bengal from Persia to preach Islam, and his son, Mir Sayyid Abdullah, was appointed as the Chief Qadi of Jafarpur by the Emperor of Delhi.

Titumir was educated in a local madrasa, where he became a hafiz of the Quran by the age of twenty, besides being accomplished in Bengali, Arabic, and Persian. A good wrestler and gymnast, he served as the bodyguard of a local zamindar for some time. However, Titumir was jailed on account of a conflict with zamindars for high taxes from farmers and upon release, in 1822, left his job to embark upon Hajj.

== Religious-political activism ==
=== Islamic resurgence ===
In Mecca, Titumir was influenced by the Islamist preacher Syed Ahmad Barelvi, an Indian Muslim revivalist, who advocated for jihad against the British East India Company rule and strict enforcement of sharia.

Upon return from Mecca, he began to mobilize the Bengali Muslim peasantry of his native place by preaching against aspects of Islam that were seen as deviations from the Quran and Sunnah by Islamists —veneraion of Sufi graves, performance of dhikr, folk syncretism, charging of interest on loans, etc. — and declaring the zamindars — who were mostly, Bengali Hindus — to be in cahoots with the Company regime, who was blamed for promoting these deviations by overthrowing the Mughal rule.

The lowest classes of the Bengali Muslim society responded favorably but his emphasis on Islamic fundamentalism ensured negligible support from Hindu peasantry. However, the Zamindar community, irrespective of religion objected to his activities.

=== Confrontation with zamindars ===
In June 1830, Krishnadeva Rai, the Zamindar of Punra — in some sources, alternately described as the Talukdar of Sarfarazpur — imposed an annual tax similar to jizya on all bearded Muslims subjects to combat increase in radicalism among them caused by Titumir's preaching. On Titumir's advice, the peasants refused to pay and an enraged Krishnadeva led a levy of armed men on a spree of arson, even destroying a local mosque. The Muslims reciprocated but the melee remained inconclusive; complaints were filed at the Baduria police station by both sides and eventually, the subdivisional magistrate of Barasat dismissed the issue but only after getting a declaration from the peasants about committing to peace.

Buoyed up by the lack of any punishment for Krishnadeva, fellow Zamindars — Ramnarayan Nag Chaudhuri of Taragonia and Guru Prasad Chowdhury of Nagarpur — instituted similar tax-regime on their subjects and imprisoned dissenters. The peasants organised themselves and sued the Zamindars but to little avail. This led Titu to advocate for a full-fledged armed resistance against what he felt to be the nexus of Zamindars and Company; Atis Dasgupta, a scholar of peasant rebellions in early colonial India, notes that here onward, what was essentially a socio-religious agitation against misrule of Hindu zamindars morphed into a political-economic class-struggle against British rule.

=== Confrontations with the Company and Zamindars ===
Titumir shifted his base from Chandpur to Narikelberia, and began organizing an armed militia. In October 1830, one of his declarations proclaimed him to be the natural sovereign of the country, who — rather than the Company — had a unilateral right of remittance on local revenues collected by zamindars; a Muslim landholder was raided in the same month for having disobeyed him.

On 31 October, Titumir set out to avenge a Bengali Hindu zamindar called Krishnadeva along with 300 armed followers; his residence was ransacked, establishments of Hindu moneylenders in the local market were set on fire, and a cow was slaughtered in front of a Hindu temple in an act of desecration to avenge the previously mentioned demolition of the mosque. In response, the Hindu zamindars, outraged at the inflammatory activities of the Muslims formed an alliance with the British indigo planters to render mutual assistance in case of assaults by Titumir's militia. Soon Kaliprasanna Mukherjee, the zamindar of Habra-Gobardanga and a key member of the alliance, was targeted and though Davies, manager of a nearby plantation at Mollahati, came to aid with about 200 men, they were soundly defeated. Davies escaped narrowly and was sheltered by Debnath Roy, the zamindar of Gobra-Gobindapur; this precipitated a confrontation between Titumir's militia and Debnath's forces at Laughati in Nadia, where the latter was killed. Several Indigo plantations were subsequently set on fire.

The month of November was replete with such cases and the local police proved to be of little use in the face of increasing peasant resistance; many of the Zamindars fled to Kolkata. The Commissioner of the Presidency Division was solicited to tackle the situation, and accordingly, on 15 November 1830, Alexander, the Joint Magistrate of Barasat — along with Ramram Chakraborti, Officer-In-Charge of Baduria Thana — set out for Titumir with a force of 120 policemen. Outnumbered by a 500-strong militia, they were defeated; Alexander barely escaped to a neighboring village while Ramram perished alongside 14 others.

== State declaration ==
By 1831, there was a political vacuum in large parts of the Parganas, and Titumir capitalized on it, styling himself as the Badshah and having thousands of low-caste Muslim peasants among his followers. People loyal to him were installed in official positions — his nephew Ghulam Masum Khan served as the Senapati, Muizz ad-Din as the Wazir etc. — and zamindars were compelled to either submit to his rule or vacate the land-holdings.

=== Final battle ===
On the evening of 18 November 1831, Major Scott, Lieutenant Shakespeare, and Major Sutherland led a military column — composed of a cavalry unit and an infantry unit, having 300 armed personnel and two cannons — to lay a siege to Titumir's fort. Nothing of significance transpired until the next morning when a concerted ammunition charge was mounted. The resistance was breached in about three hours, with the fort giving way to cannons.

Titumir was bayoneted to death, as were 50 fellow soldiers. About 800 others were arrested and tried at Alipur Court; Golam Masum was hanged in front of the ruins of the fort, and about 140 had to serve prison terms of varying lengths. The commanding officer of the British forces not only noted Titumir's bravery in dispatches to London but also commented on the strength and resilience of bamboo as a material for fortification, since he had had to pound the fort with artillery for a surprisingly long time.

== Contemporary reception ==
The newspapers and journals run by Englishmen and Christian missionaries took the government-line. Other media controlled by the Bengali Hindu middle class like the Samachar Chandrika, Reformer, Jnananveshan etc. sided with the zamindars and denounced Titumir as a law-and-order nuisance.

== Legacy ==
In 2004, Titumir was ranked number 11 in the BBC's poll of the Greatest Bengali of All Time.

A play-drama Titumir-er Basher Kella, directed by Sheikh Kamal was broadcast in 1967 on Bangladesh Television (then PTV); a graphic novel of the same name was also popular in East Pakistan. In Dhaka, Jinnah College was renamed to Government Titumir College in 1971. On 19 November 1992, the 161st anniversary of his death, the Government of Bangladesh issued a commemorative stamp in his honor. The principal base of Bangladesh Navy is named as 'BNS Titumir'.

Mahasweta Devi wrote a novella Titumir that sought to recover subaltern history. In 1978, Utpal Dutt directed an agitprop drama Titumir which critiqued the crude representation of Titumir in colonial historiography; it received critical acclaim and was commercially successful. Titumir metro station on Kolkata Metro Orange Line was named after him which was later changed to City Centre II in 2021. The main bus stand at Chapadali intersection in Barasat town of North 24 Parganas has been named "Titumir Central Bus Terminal".
