= 2017 Baduria riots =

Communal riot in Basirhat, West Bengal in 2017

- Date: 2 July 2017
- Location: West Bengal, India; 22.66°N 88.89°E
- Caused by: Facebook post by an 11 Class student
- Methods: Protesting, rioting, rock throwing, looting, arson, mobbing

Casualties
- Death: 1
- Injuries: 23
- Arrested: 71
- Location of the riots in West Bengal, India

Baduria riot refers to incidents of communal violence between Hindus and Muslims in the Baduria town in Basirhat subdivision of the North 24 Parganas district of West Bengal state of India.

== Background ==
Tensions started rising after a Facebook post on Muhammad and Kaaba by a 17-year-old student on 2 July 2017. The images were seen as objectionable and went viral in Baduria. He was later arrested. It is claimed that this violence was an outcome of local outrage of the Muslim groups, but according to some news sources and local media, villagers of Baduria, Basirhat, and the environs claimed the rioters were outsiders.

== Riots ==
Following the post made on 2 July by the school boy, a mob of an estimated 5,000 people blockaded the Baduria police station, demanding that the accused be brought before the crowd. The post also resulted in an arson attack on the accused's house. He was arrested on the evening of 3 July 2017.

The Baduria police station was attacked and set ablaze along with several police vehicles on the night of 3 July. A violent mob put up road blockades at several places and attacked members of other community, besides destroying many shops.

Muslim mobs set upon shops and houses belonging to Hindus in Baduria, Swarupnagar, Basirhat and Taki. Rath Yatras at several places were attacked. Violent clashes were triggered between the two communities of Basirhat city area. The Union government deployed four Border Security Force (BSF) companies containing a total of 400 personnel to check the violence in the region. Section 144 was imposed while the internet services were suspended. In retaliatory attacks on 6 July, Hindu mobs attacked a dargah and vandalised shops and houses in addition to clashing with the police. The office of a local TMC leader also comes under attack. On July 7, several Hindu temples were attacked by a Muslim mob of about 70-90 people. They also allegedly attacked and harassed Hindu families.

About 25 people including 20 policemen were reported to have been injured in the violence. The house and party office of a local TMC MLA Dipendu Biswas was also set on fire by the rioters. A 65 year old died after being stabbed by the rioter mobs in the clashes while trying to return home.

== Fake news and provocative statements ==
Vijeta Malik who is reported to be the Haryana State Executive Member of BJP allegedly posted a well-known scene of a Bhojpuri movie Aurat Khilona Nahi and cited it as an incident in Baduaria clashes where Hindu women were severely abused and the crowd just watched. This fake news went viral. Despite several appeals from Kolkata and West Bengal Police, sharing of what is described as "fake news" continued and tensions were exacerbated.

=== Involvement of BJP leaders ===
One Kolkata-based citizen, Bhabotosh Chatterjee, was arrested for sharing fake news and spreading communal hatred over the internet, and another three were held for spreading fake news via multiple social media profiles. In July, two FIRs were lodged against a Delhi-based BJP leader Nupur Sharma for sharing fake news while the BJP IT cell secretary Tarun Sengupta was arrested in Asansol for posting ‘fake’ video on social media. BJP MLA T. Raja Singh Lodh made a statement asking Hindus to respond "as they did in Gujarat, to prevent Bengal from becoming Bangladesh, or face being banished as they were from Kashmir".

The West Bengal Government ordered a judiciary inquiry on the fake news propaganda and the causes of the Baduria incident. While responding to a PIL filed in the Calcutta High Court, the State stated that around 71 people had been arrested and a total of 86 cases had been registered with the police in this matter.
