= Abdur Rahim Quazi =

Indian politician

Member of the West Bengal Legislative Assembly
- In office 2016–2026
- Preceded by: Quazi Abdul Ghaffar
- Succeeded by: Burhanul Mukaddim
- Constituency: Baduria

Personal details
- Born: Baduria, West Bengal, India
- Party: Indian National Congress
- Other political affiliations: Trinamool Congress
- Profession: Politician

Abdur Rahim Quazi, is an Indian politician. He is a member of Indian National Congress. In May 2021, he was elected as MLA of West Bengal Legislative Assembly from the Baduria (Vidhan Sabha constituency) on a TMC ticket. On 31 March 2026 he defected back to his old party - the INC, upon being denied ticket from the constituency of which he is incumbent.
