= Burhanul Mukaddim =

Indian politician

Burhanul Mukaddim (Liton)

Member of the West Bengal Legislative Assembly
- Incumbent
- Assumed office 4 May 2026
- Preceded by: Abdur Rahim Quazi
- Constituency: Baduria

Personal details
- Party: All India Trinamool Congress (until 2026); Democratic Trinamool Congress (from 2026)
- Education: Postgraduate
- Occupation: Politician, educator
- Profession: Headmaster in an aided higher secondary school

Burhanul Mukaddim (also known as Liton; born 1978) is an Indian politician from West Bengal. He is a member of the West Bengal Legislative Assembly from Baduria Assembly constituency in North 24 Parganas district representing the Democratic Trinamool Congress.

== Early life and education ==
Mukaddim is from Baduria, North 24 Parganas district, West Bengal. He is the son of Abdul Khaleque. He completed his B.A. (honours) in 2000 and his B.Ed. in 2002, at colleges affiliated with Calcutta University. Later, he earned an M.A. in english from Manonmaniam Sundaranar University in 2012. He served as headmaster of an aided higher secondary school before entering politics.

== Political career ==
Mukaddim was elected to the West Bengal Legislative Assembly from Baduria in the 2026 West Bengal Legislative Assembly election as a candidate of the All India Trinamool Congress. He won the seat by a margin of 40,061 votes.
