= Iswarigachha =

- Village
- Location in West Bengal, India Iswarigachha (India)
- Coordinates: 22.73667°N 88.772432°E
- Country: India
- State: West Bengal
- District: North 24 Parganas

Population (2011)
  - Total: 3,137

Languages
  - Official: Bengali, English
- Time zone: UTC+5:30 (IST)
- PIN: 743 401 (Baduria)
- Telephone/STD code: 03217
- Lok Sabha constituency: Basirhat
- Vidhan Sabha constituency: Baduria
- Website: north24parganas.nic.in

Iswarigachha is a village in the Baduria CD block in the Basirhat subdivision of the North 24 Parganas district in the state of West Bengal, India.

== Geography ==
Cities, towns and locations in Basirhat subdivision, North 24 Parganas district
M: municipal town, CT: census town, R: rural/ urban centre
Owing to space constraints in the small map, the actual locations in a larger map may vary slightly

=== Location ===
Iwarigachha is located at 22.73667°N 88.772432°E.

=== Area overview ===
The area shown in the map is a part of the Ichhamati-Raimangal Plain, located in the lower Ganges Delta. It contains soil of mature black or brownish loam to recent alluvium. Numerous rivers, creeks and khals criss-cross the area. The tip of the Sundarbans National Park is visible in the lower part of the map (shown in green but not marked). The larger full screen map shows the full forest area. A large section of the area is a part of the Sundarbans settlements. The densely populated area is an overwhelmingly rural area. Only 12.96% of the population lives in the urban areas and 87.04% of the population lives in the rural areas.

Note: The map alongside presents some of the notable locations in the subdivision. All places marked in the map are linked in the larger full screen map.

== Civic administration ==
=== CD block HQ ===
The headquarters of Baduria CD block are located at Iswarigachha.

== Demographics ==
According to the 2011 Census of India, Iswarigachha had a total population of 3,137, of which 1,585 (51%) were males and 1,552 (49%) were females. Population in the age range 0–6 years was 347. The total number of literate persons in Iswarigachha was 2,235 (80.11% of the population over 6 years).

== Transport ==
Iswarigachha is on Berachampa-Baduria Road.
