= Tariqah-i-Muhammadiya movement in Bengal =

Islamic militant movement in 19th century Bengal

Tariqah-i-Muhammadiya
- তরিকতে মুহাম্মদিয়া
- Black jihadist flag
- Leader: Titumir
- Dates active: 1830 (as armed militia)
- Dissolved: 1830 (as armed militia)
- Headquarters: Narikelbaria, Bengal Presidency, Company Raj
- Active regions: Bengal
- Ideology: Jihadism; Islamic reformism; Islamic revivalism; Sufism; Anti-colonialism; Factions: Bengali nationalism
- Status: Inactive
- Size: Over 1000

Tariqah-i-Muhammadiya in Bengal (Bengali: তরিকতে মুহাম্মদিয়া, romanized: Tôrikôtē Muhāmmôdiẏā, lit. 'Order of Muhammad'), was an offshoot of the wider anti-colonial Islamic revivalist, reformist and jihadist militant Tarīqah-e-Mūhammadiyāh movement led by Titumir in the early nineteenth century. Tarīqah-e-Mūhammadiyāh was pioneered by Syed Ahmed Barelvi and Shah Isma'il Dehlavi based on theological works of Shah Waliullah Dehlavi. It reached Bengal in 1820s, when Syed Ahmed Barelvi visited Calcutta, and Titumir became his disciple.

The movement's followers were adherents of Sufism who emphasized the importance of a murshid (spiritual guide) in cultivating purity of thought and action.
