= Baduria =

Town in West Bengal, India

- Town
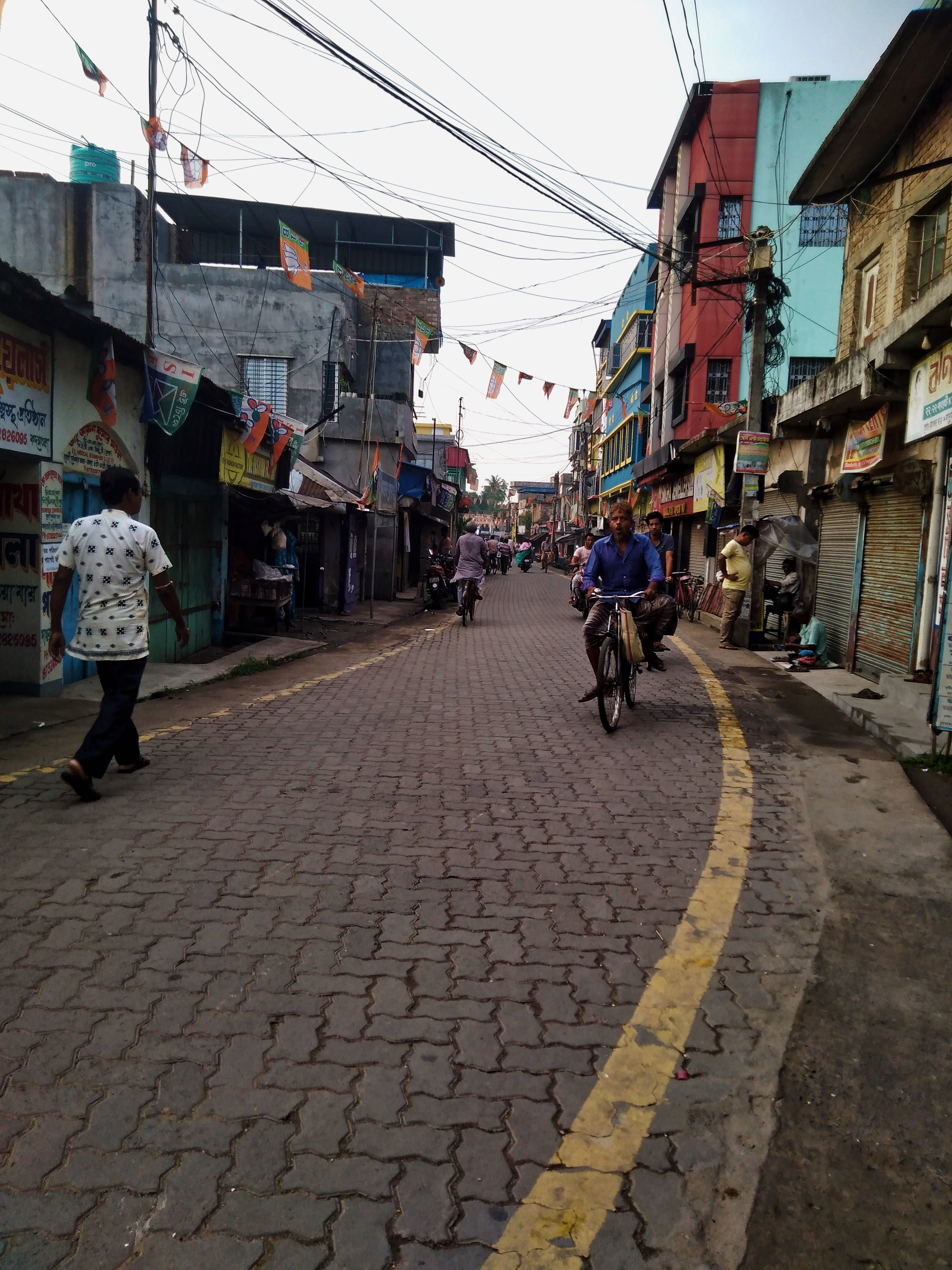
- Baduria City-Road

- Location in West Bengal, India Baduria (India)
- Coordinates: 22.74°N 88.79°E
- Country: India
- State: West Bengal
- District: North 24 Parganas

Government
  - Type: Municipality
  - Body: Baduria Municipality
  - Municipality Chairman: Dipankar Bhattacharaya

Area
  - Total: 22.43 km^{2} (8.66 sq mi)
- Elevation: 8 m (26 ft)

Population (2001)
  - Total: 47,418
  - Density: 2,114/km^{2} (5,475/sq mi)

Languages
  - Official: Bengali, English
- Time zone: UTC+5:30 (IST)
- ISO 3166 code: IN-WB
- Lok Sabha constituency: Basirhat
- Vidhan Sabha constituency: Baduria
- Website: https://www.baduriamunicipality-gov.in

Baduria is a town and a municipality in Basirhat subdivision of North 24 Parganas district in the Indian state of West Bengal.

== Geography ==
Cities, towns and locations in Basirhat subdivision, North 24 Parganas district
M: municipal town, CT: census town, R: rural/ urban centre
Owing to space constraints in the small map, the actual locations in a larger map may vary slightly

=== Location ===
Baduria is located at 22.74°N 88.79°E. It has an average elevation of 8 metres (26 feet).

=== Area overview ===
The area shown in the map is a part of the Ichhamati-Raimangal Plain, located in the lower Ganges Delta. It contains soil of mature black or brownish loam to recent alluvium. Numerous rivers, creeks and khals criss-cross the area. The tip of the Sundarbans National Park is visible in the lower part of the map (shown in green but not marked). The larger full screen map shows the full forest area. A large section of the area is a part of the Sundarbans settlements. The densely populated area is an overwhelmingly rural area. Only 12.96% of the population lives in the urban areas and 87.04% of the population lives in the rural areas.

Note: The map alongside presents some of the notable locations in the subdivision. All places marked in the map are linked in the larger full screen map.

== Civic administration ==
The headquarters of Baduria CD Block at Iswarigachha are located just outside the municipal limits of Baduria town.

=== Police station ===
Baduria police station covers an area of 218 km^{2} and serves a population of 305,000. It has jurisdiction over Baduria municipal area and Baduria CD Block. It has two outposts: Baduria town outpost and Puro outpost. There is a totally unfenced international border stretching across 2.5 km.

== Demographics ==
According to the 2011 Census of India, Baduria had a total population of 52,493, of which 26,799 (51%) were males and 25,694 (49%) were females. Population in the age range 0–6 years was 5,185. The total number of literate persons in Baduria was 38,770 (81.95% of the population over 6 years).

As of 2001 India census, Baduria had a population of 47,418. Males constitute 51% of the population and females 49%. Baduria has an average literacy rate of 67%, higher than the national average of 59.5%; with 55% of the males and 45% of females literate. 13% of the population is under 6 years of age.

== Transport ==
State Highway 3 (locally known as Habra-Baisrhat Road) passes through Baduria.

== Education ==
As Baduria is a very old city, the schools here are also very old. Especially Baduria LMS School was built during the British period. Moreover, many schools were established even before the independence of India. At present, many English medium schools have been established in Baduria, along with about 222 primary.Also there is a Ramkrishna Sebaashram where a schooling system is present upto 10th. The names of seven high schools are given below-

- 1.Arbalia J. V. Higher Secondary School (co-educational).
- 2.Baduria Dilip Kumar Memorial Institution (co-educational).
- 3.Baduria Kadambini Devi Girls High School (co-educational).
- 4.Baduria L.M.S. High School (co-educational).
- 5.Baduria L.M.S. Girls High School (girls only).
- 6.Jashaikati High School.
- 7.Rudrapur Radhavallabh High School (co-educational).

== Healthcare ==
Rudrapur (Baduria) Rural Hospital with 60 beds functions as the main medical facility in Baduria CD Block. There are primary health centres at Dakshin Chatra (with 6 beds), Jadurhati (with 6 beds), and Model Belghoria (Bajitpur PHC with 10 beds).There are over 250 registered chemist shops and local pharmacies located in and around the Baduria region. This includes popular national pharmacy chains like Apollo pharmacy, Medplus and Davaindia, and also local medical halls, and independent distributors.

== See also ==
- 2017 Baduria riots

== Baduria's Picture (Gallery) ==
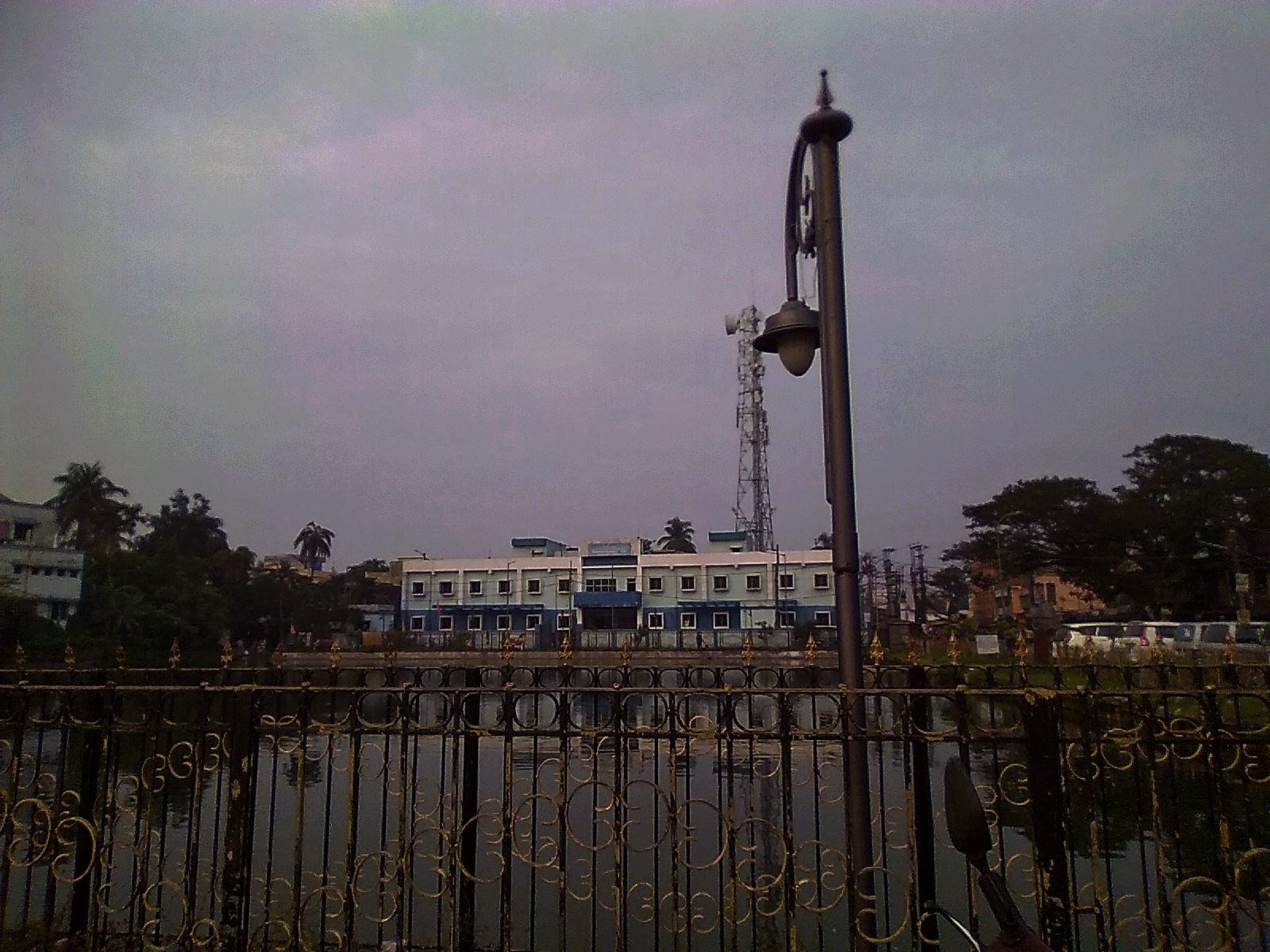
Baduria Karmatirtha

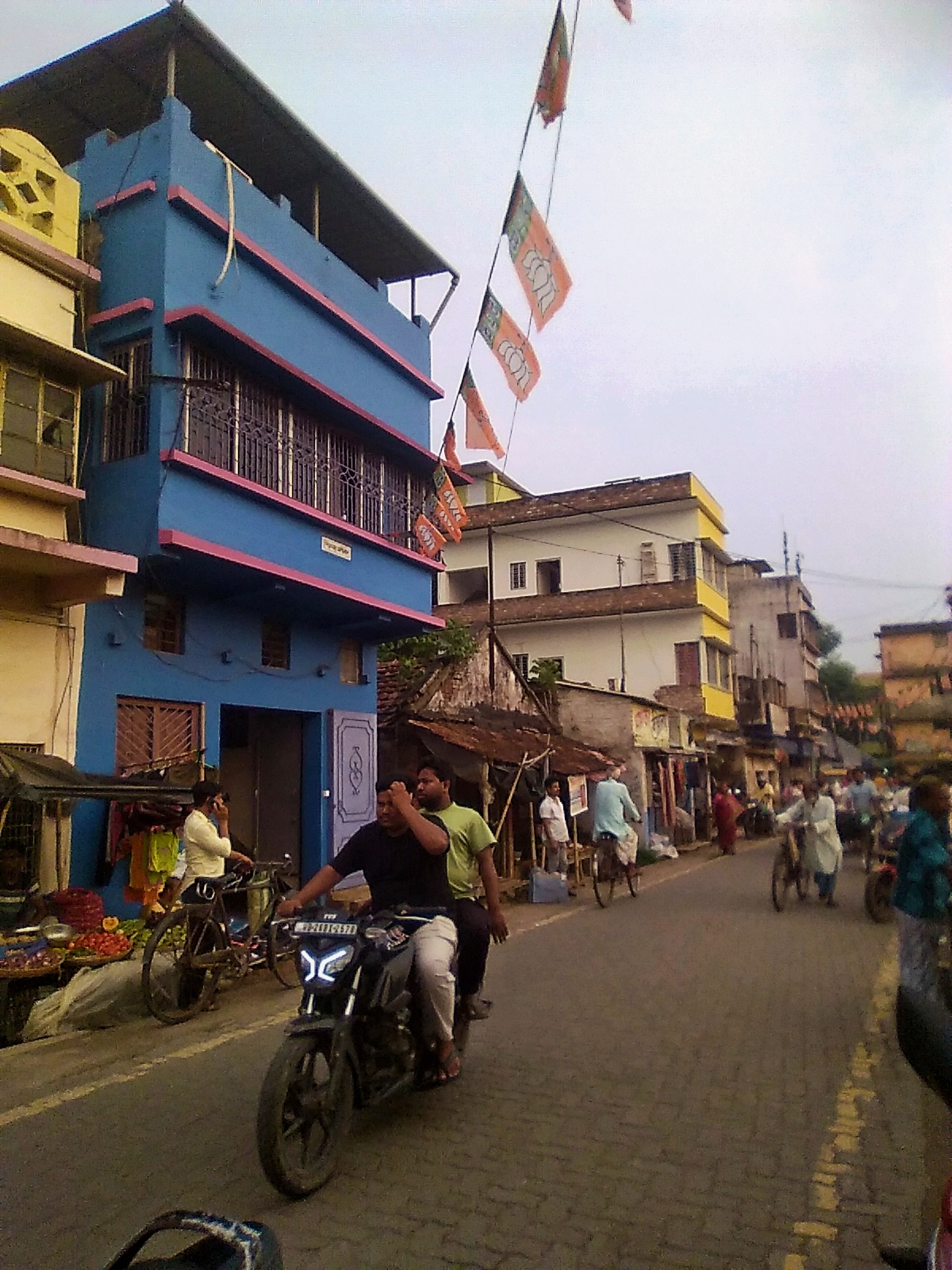
Baduria New Durga Mandir Area

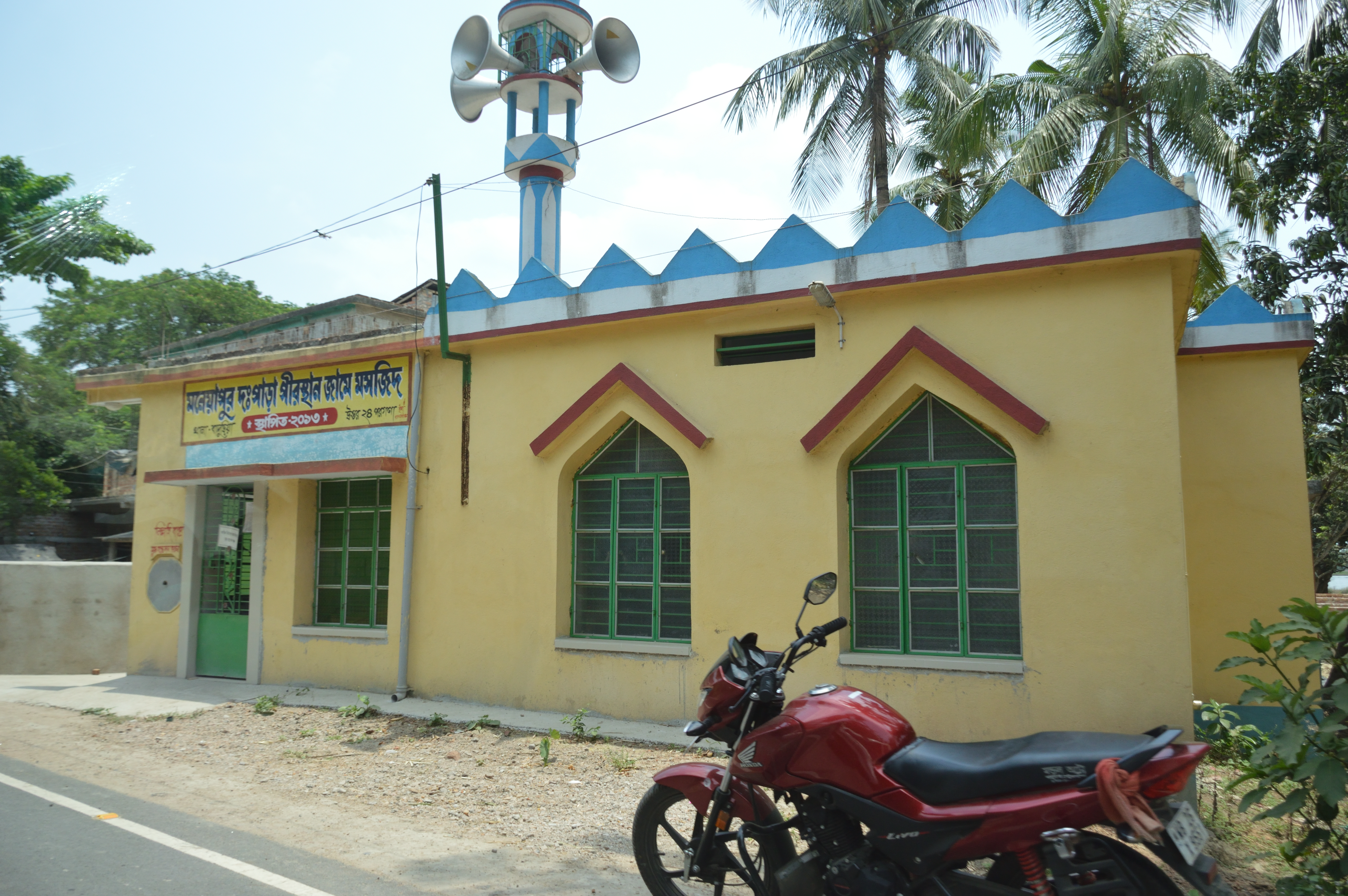
South Maleyapur Pirsthan Jame Mosque

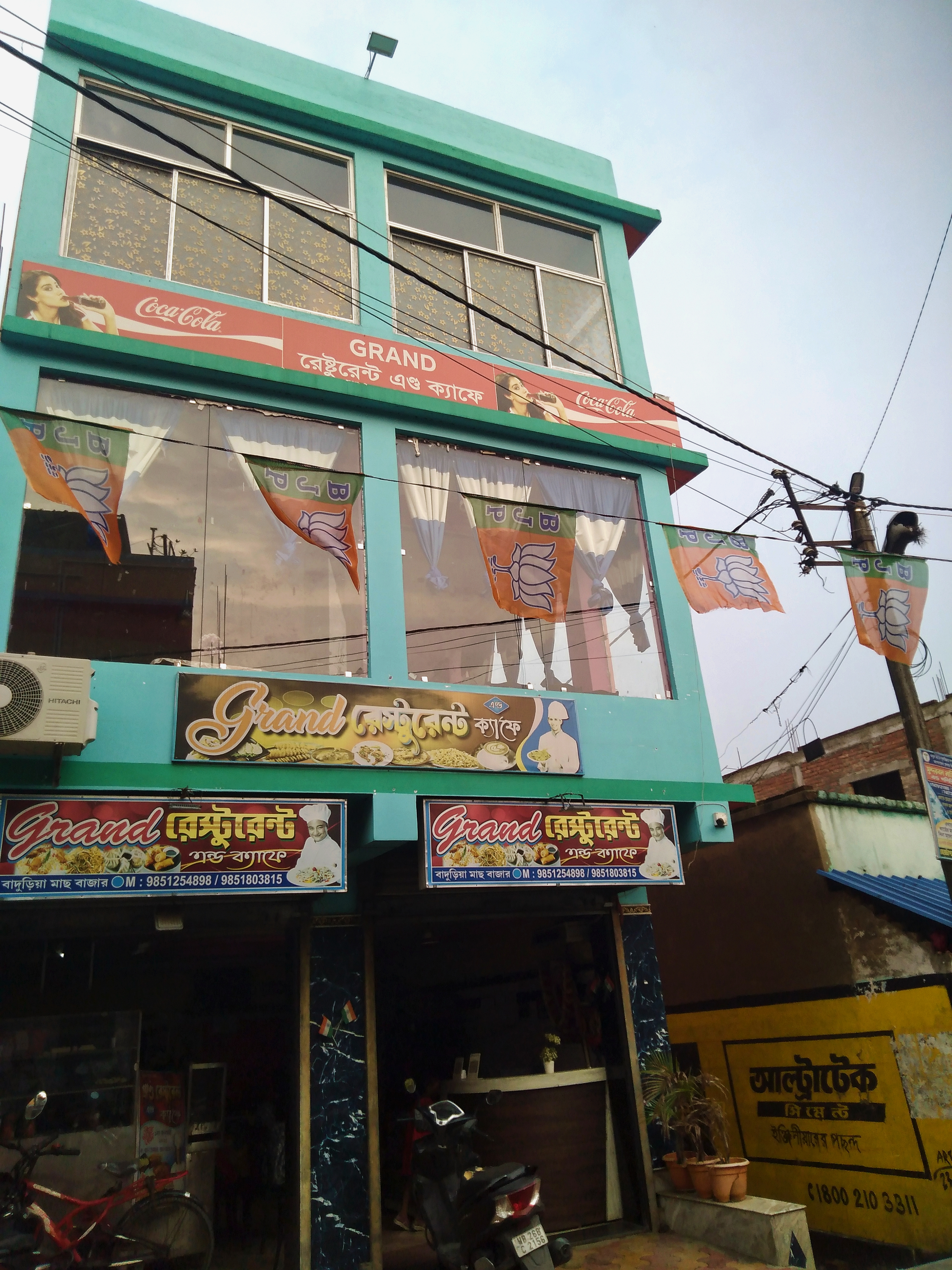
Baduria Grand Restaurant

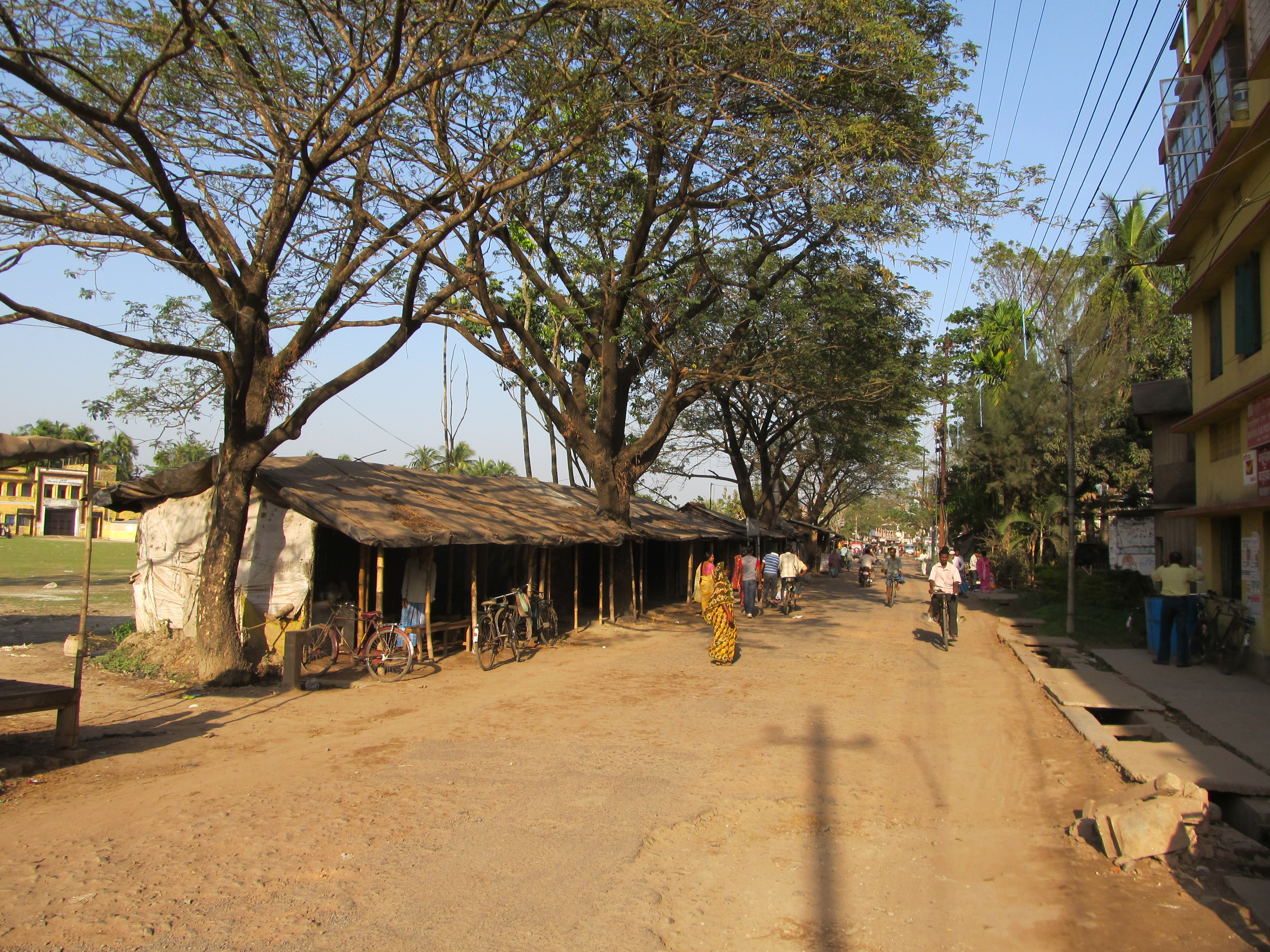
The Berachampa-Baduria Road at Baduria sub-post office

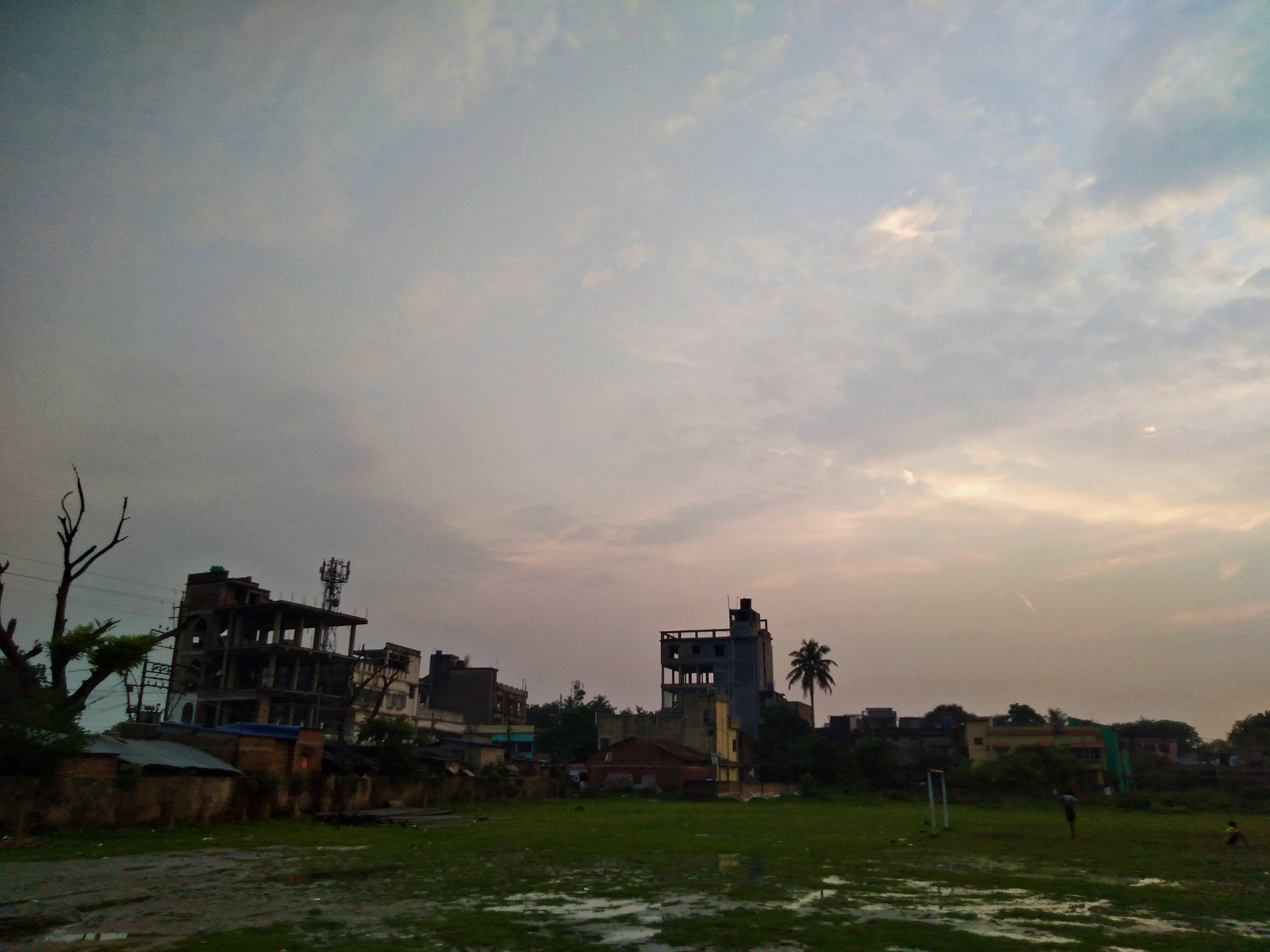
Baduria Chowmatha From DKM School.

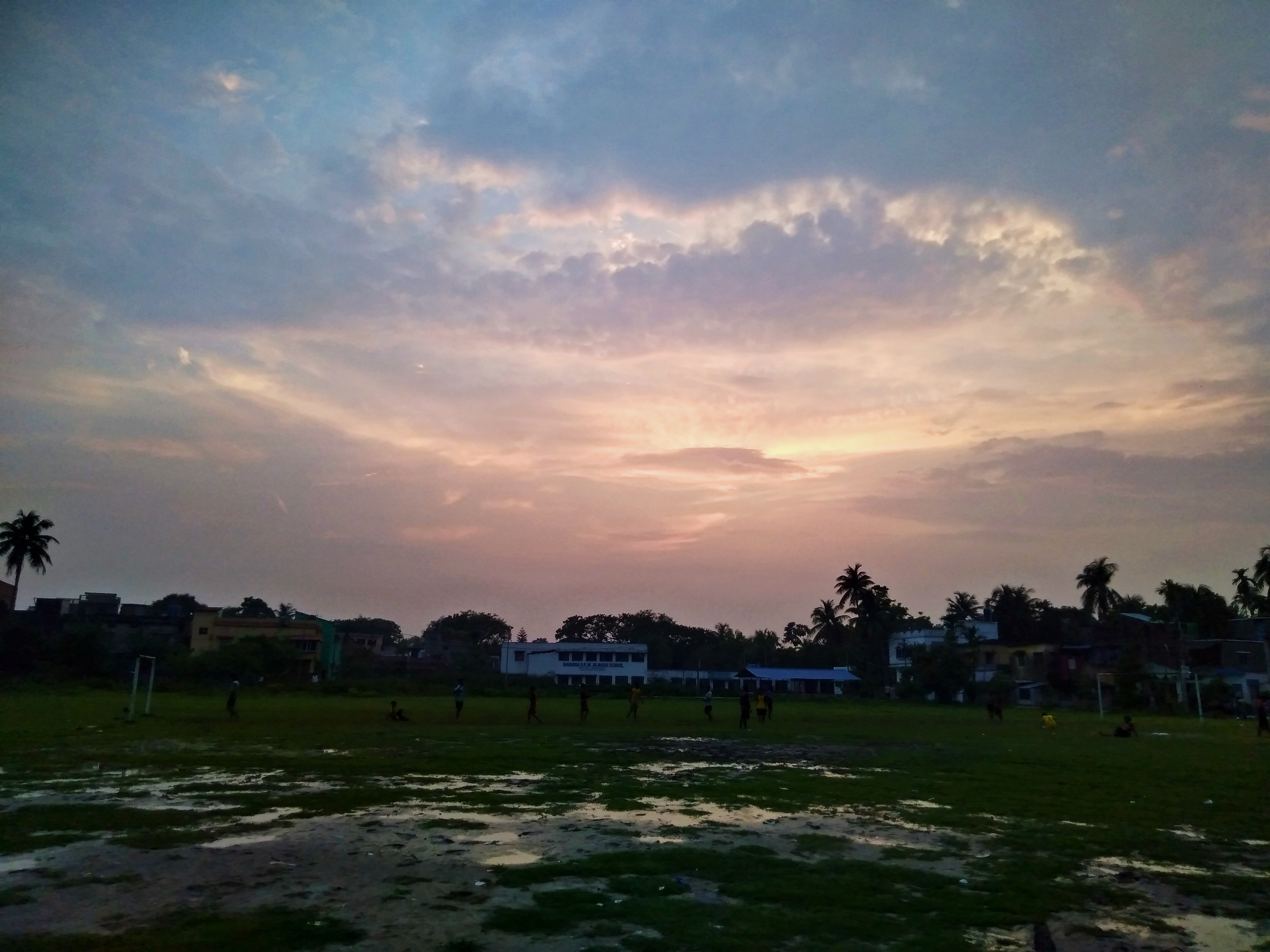
Baduria DKM School Ground

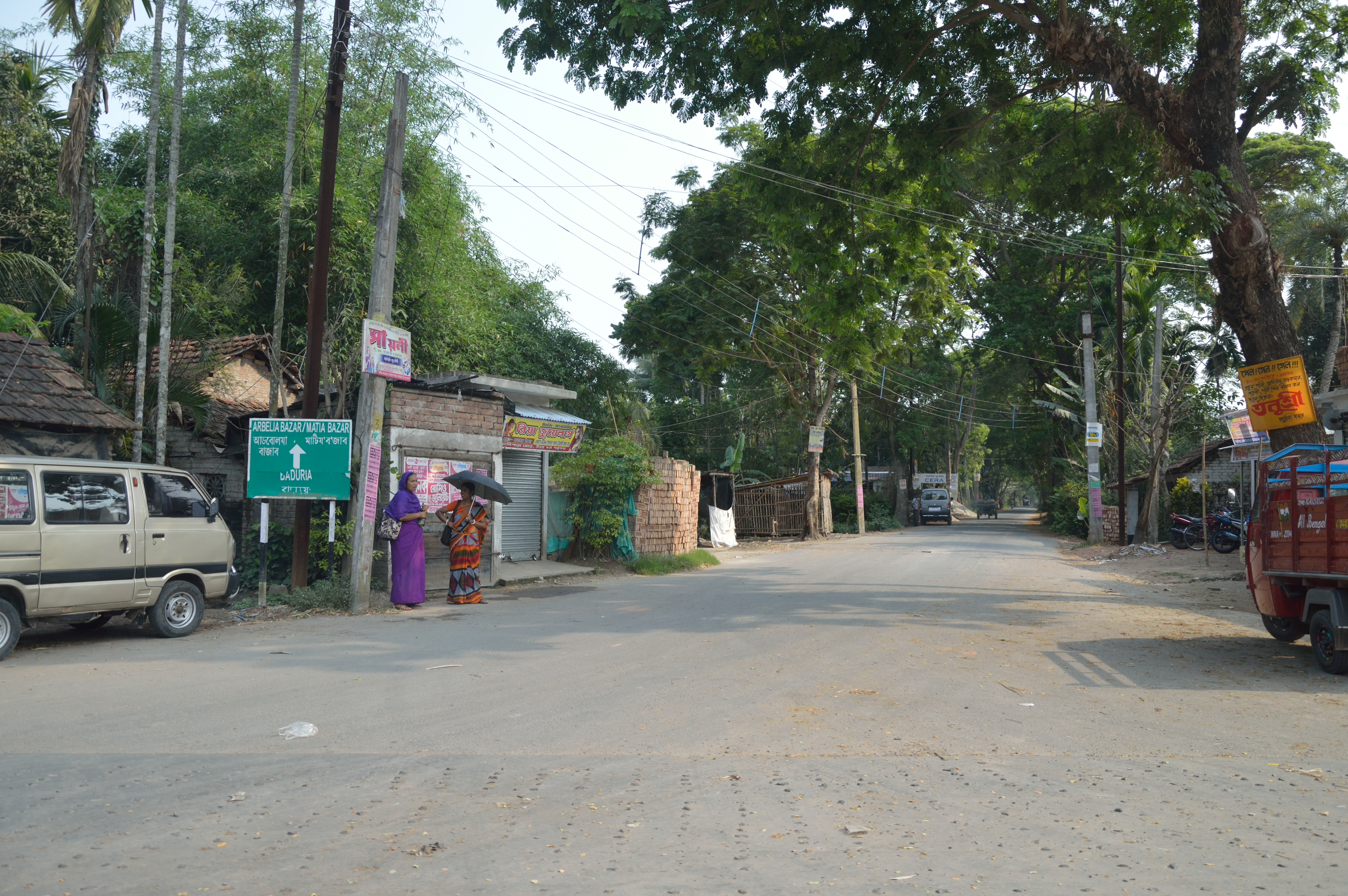
Matia-Baduria Road Dhalipara

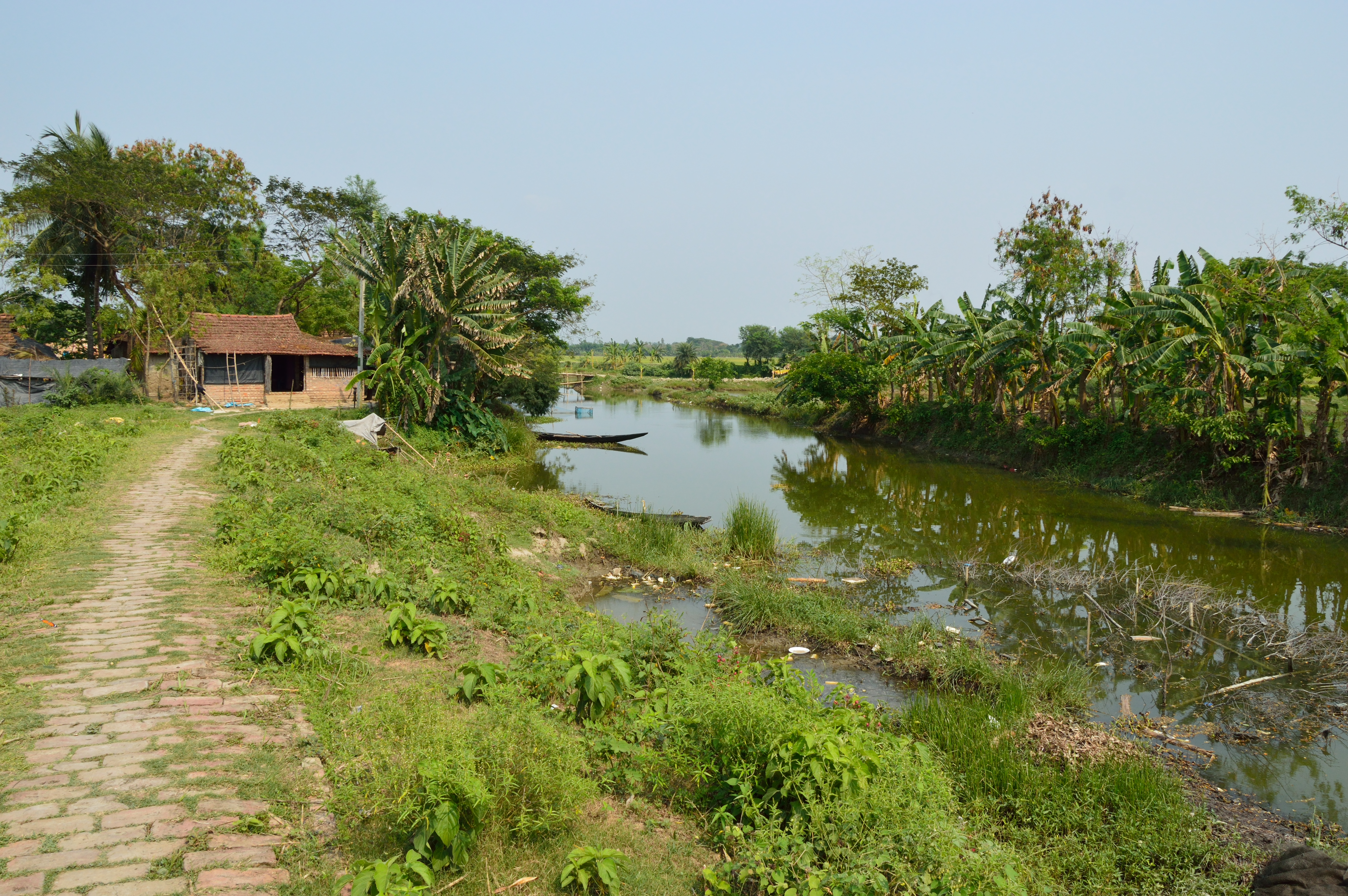
The Ichhamati at Purba Para

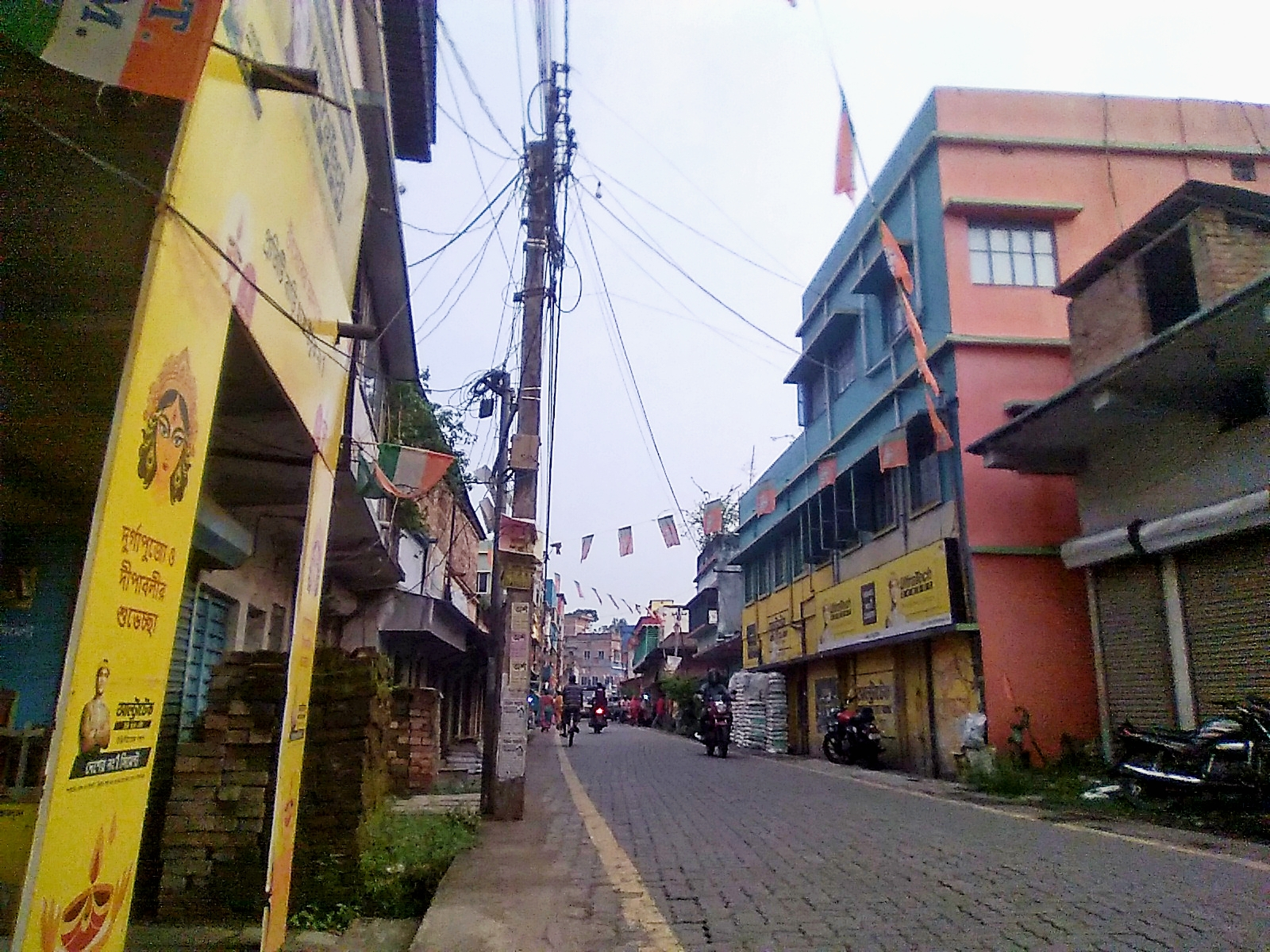
Baduria Kutubtala Kalimandir Side

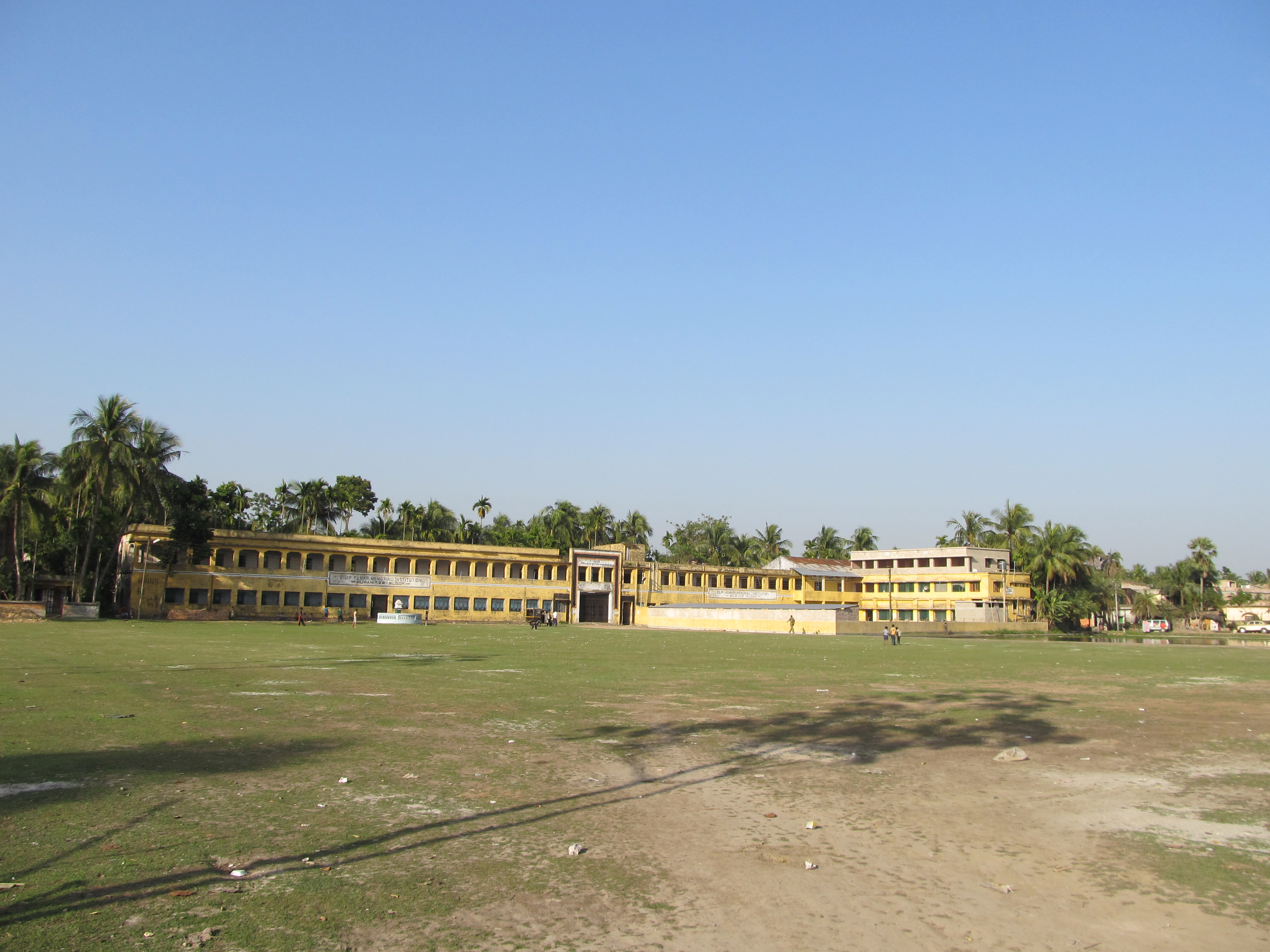
Dilip Kumar Memorial Institution

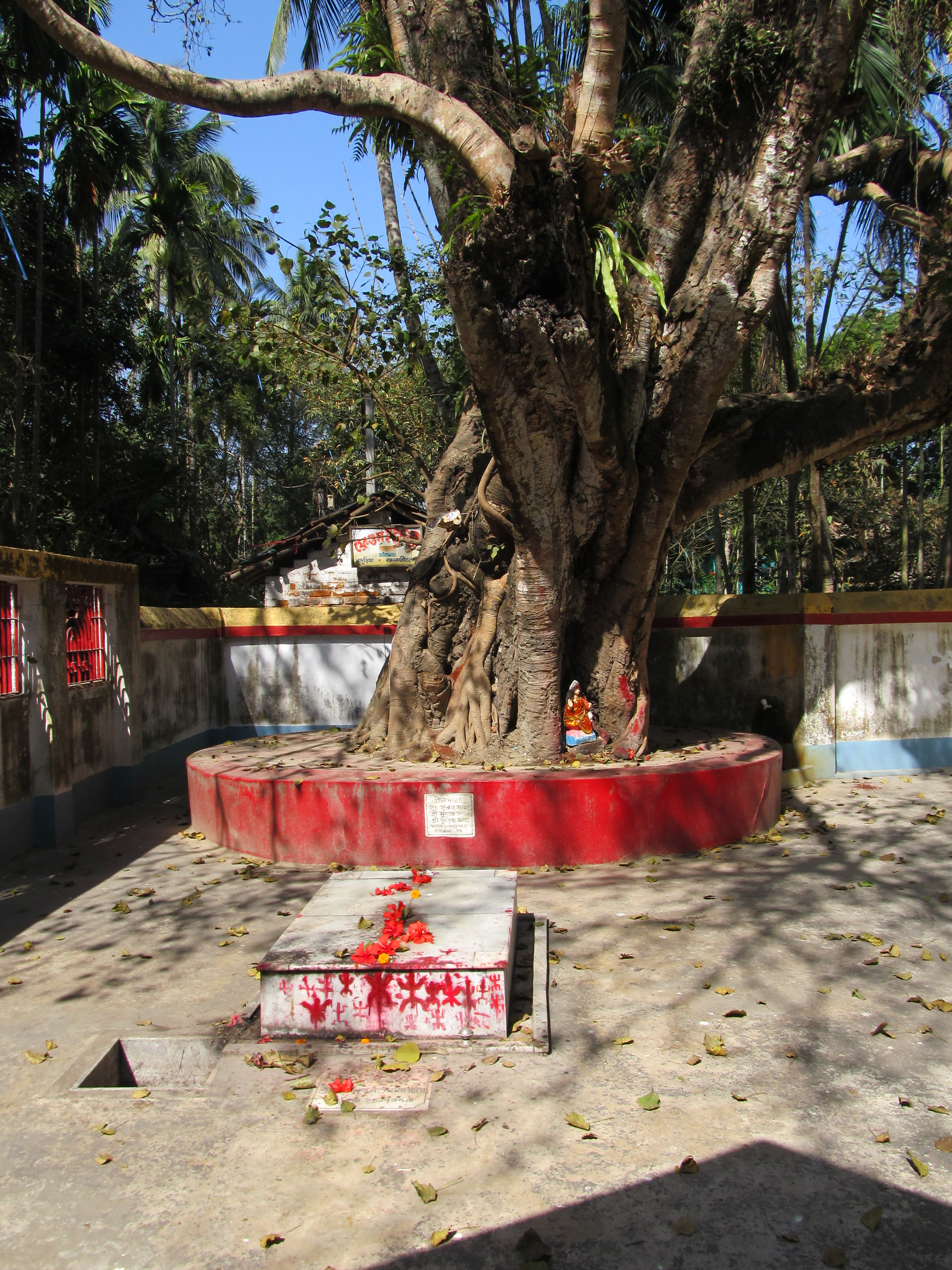
Raksha Kali shrine

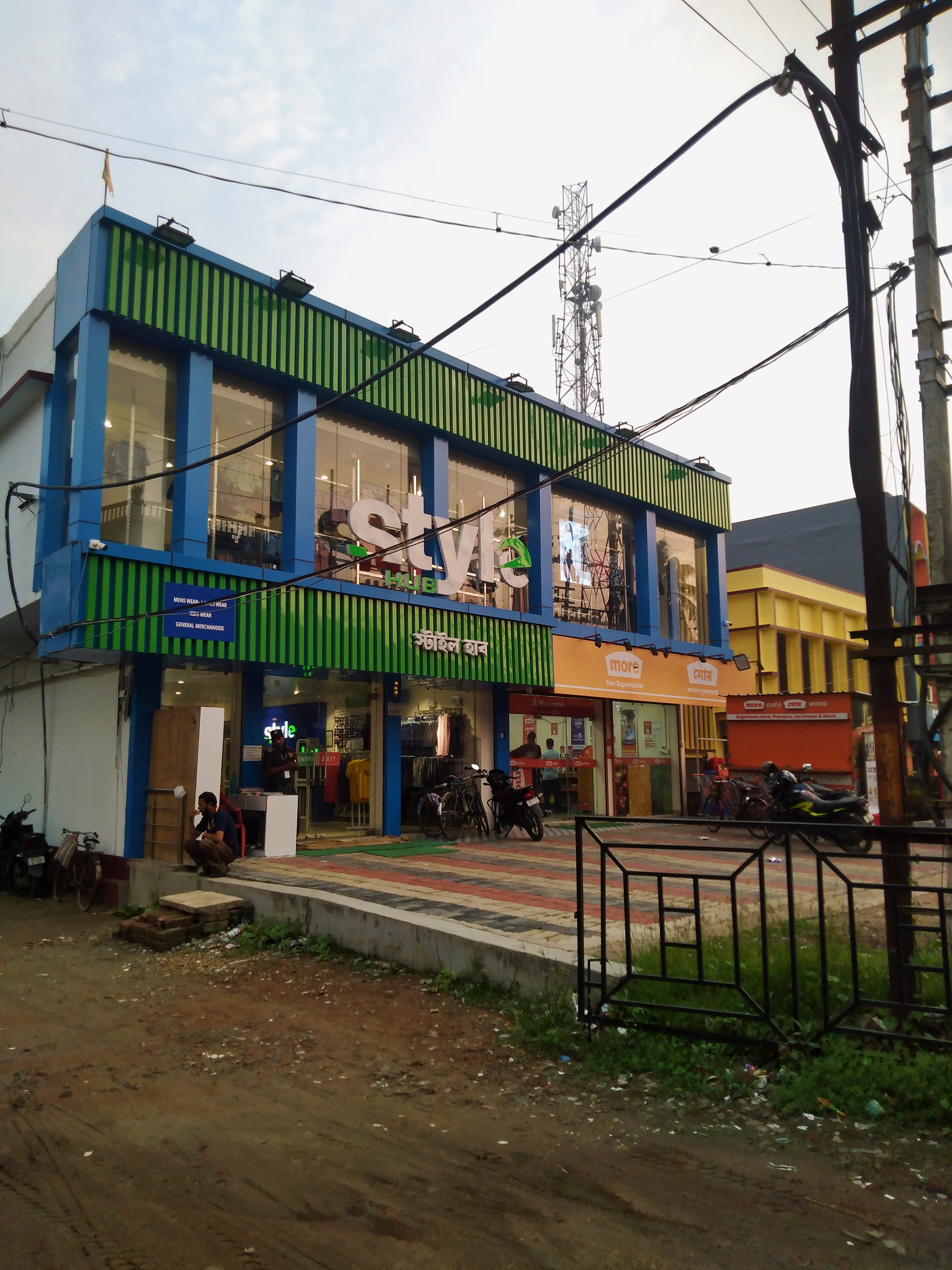
Baduria SmartHub Shopping Mall and More Super Market.

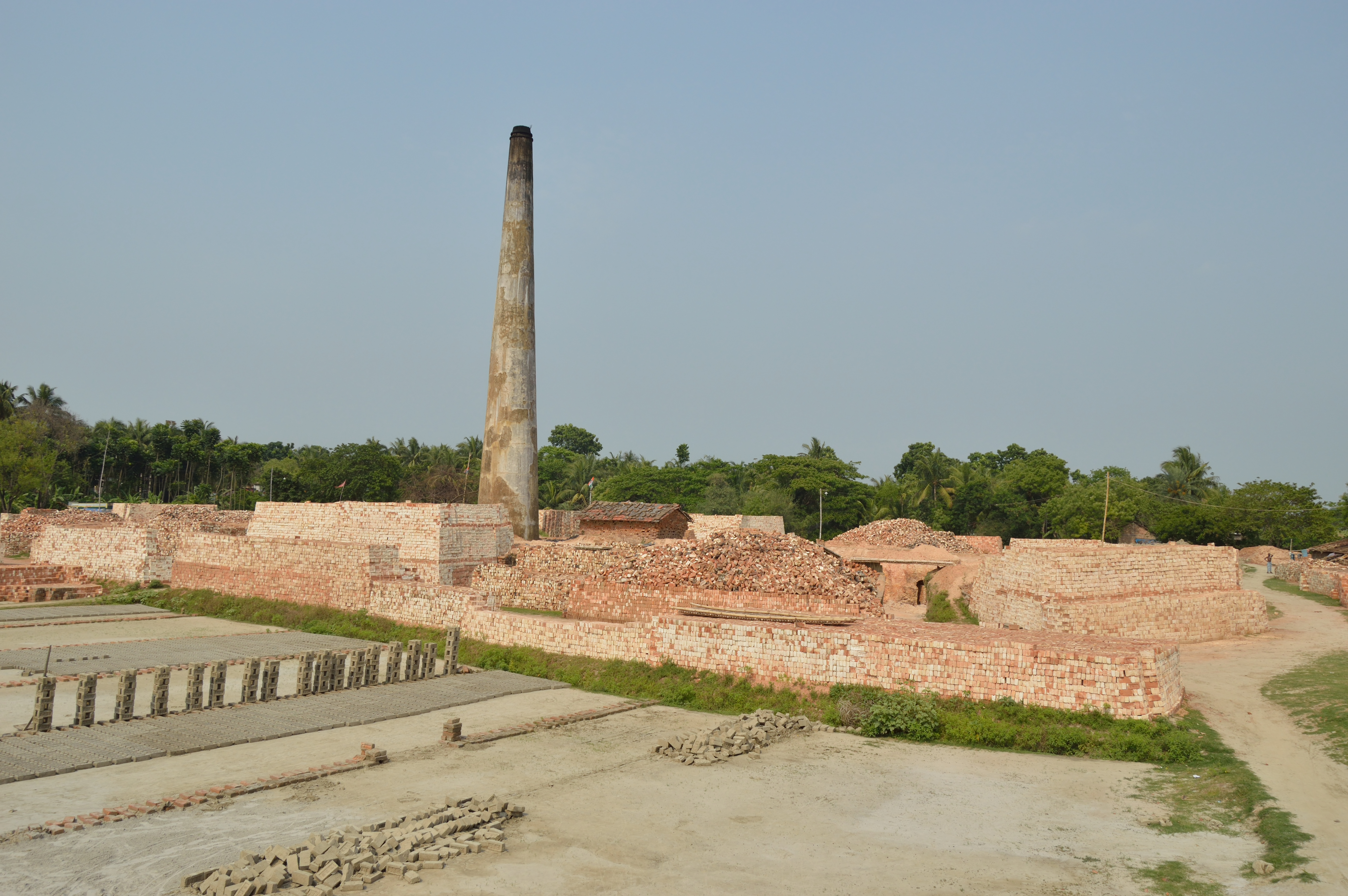
Brickfield

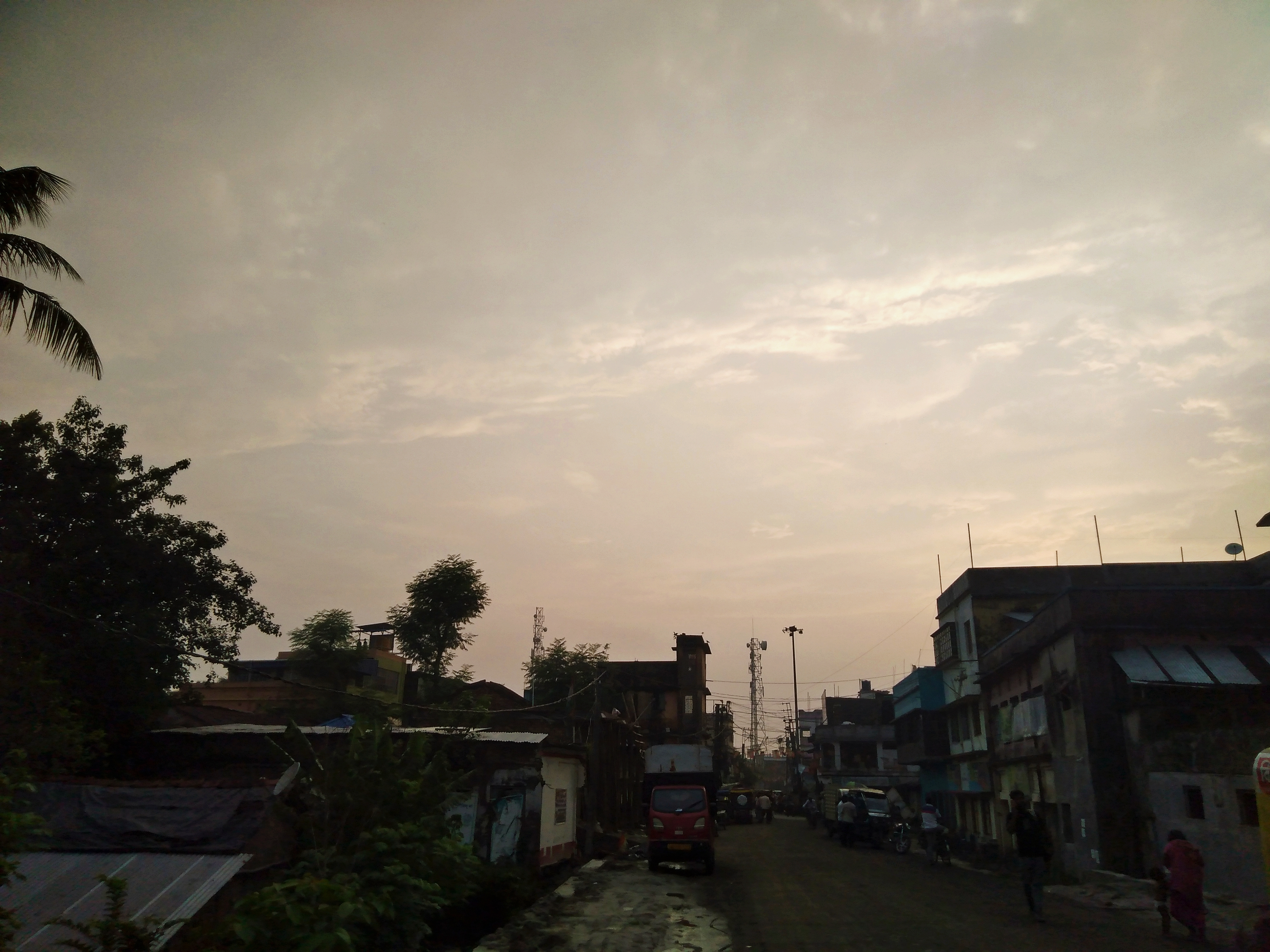
Baduria City From Bridge Way

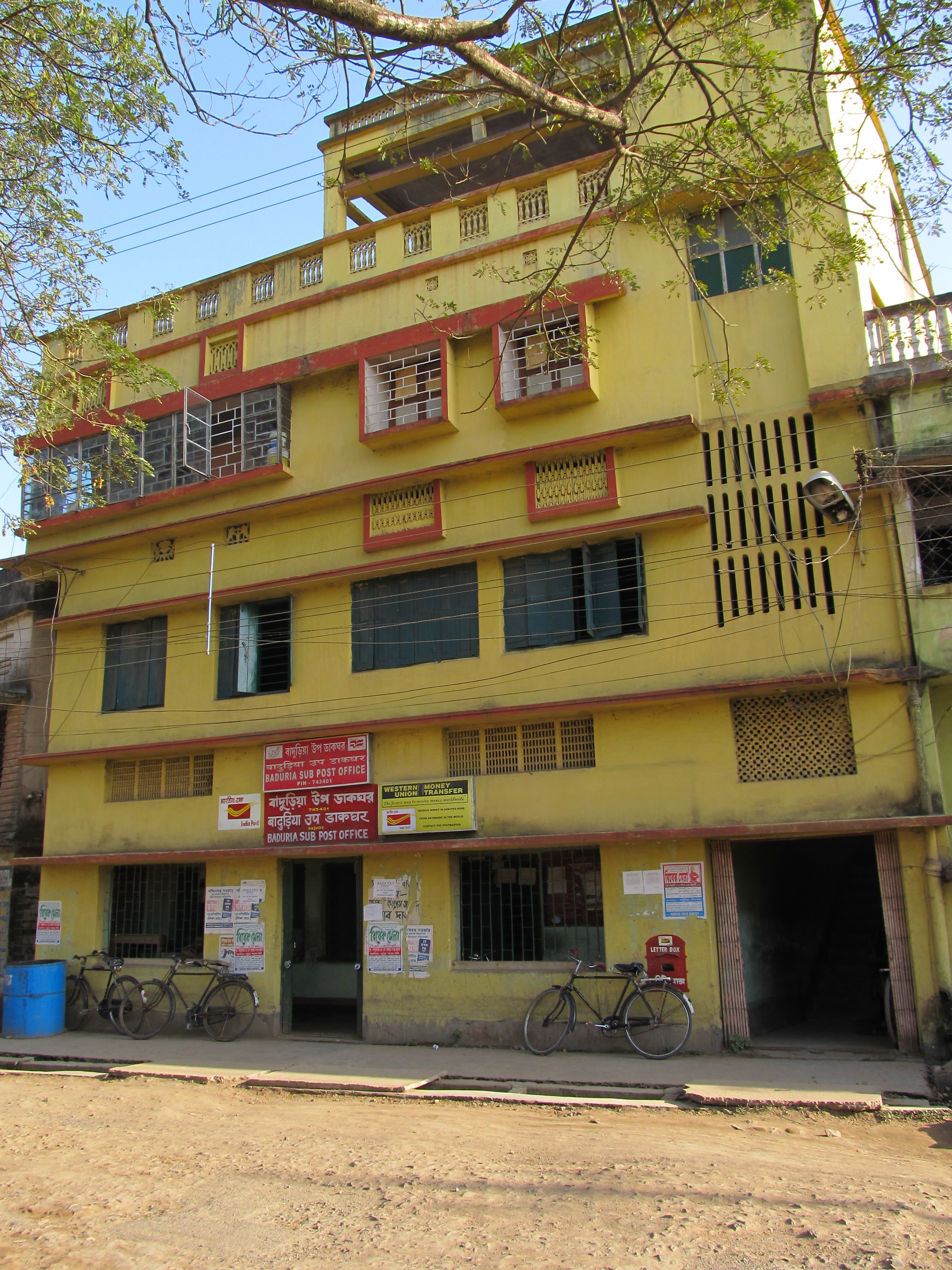
Baduria Sub-Post Office

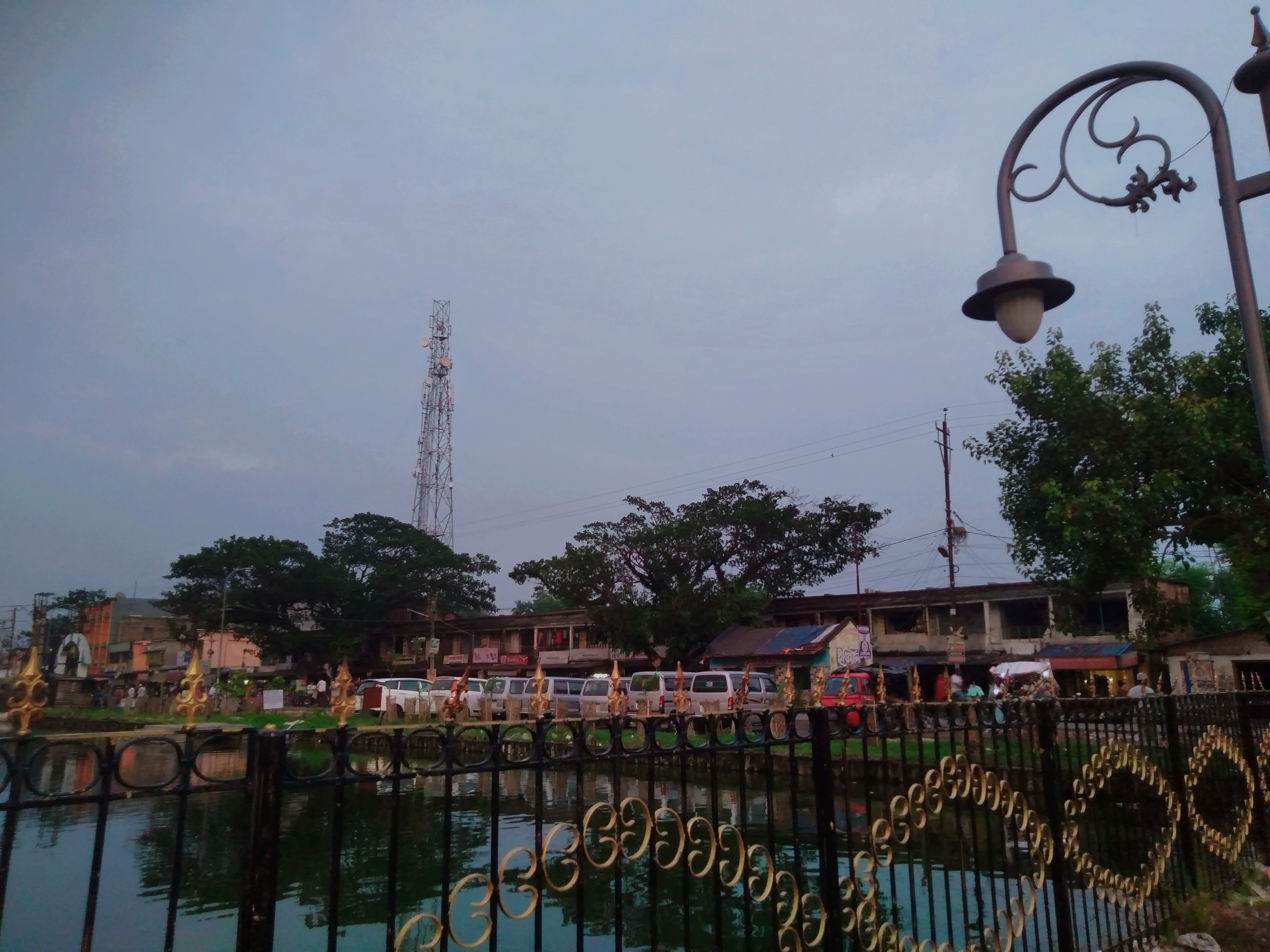
Baduria Barnalee Shopping Hub

== Notable people ==
- Abdul Gafar Siddiqui, writer
- Abdur Rahim Quazi
- Biswanath Basu
- Bipradas Pipilai
- Jahar Sen Majumdar
- Haricharan Bandopadhayaya
- Manabendra Nath Roy
- Titumir
