= Baduria Assembly constituency =

West Bengal Legislative Assembly constituency

Baduria
- Constituency No. 99 for the West Bengal Legislative Assembly
- Interactive Map Outlining Baduria Assembly Constituency

Constituency details
- Country: India
- Region: East India
- State: West Bengal
- District: North 24 Parganas
- Lok Sabha constituency: Basirhat
- Established: 1957
- Total electors: 243,747
- Reservation: None

Member of Legislative Assembly
- 18th West Bengal Legislative Assembly
- Incumbent Burhanul Mukaddim
- Party: Democratic Trinamool Congress
- Elected year: 2026

Party-wise wins in Baduria Assembly constituency
1. Indian National Congress (10) (58.8%)
2. Communist Party of India (Marxist) (5) (29.4%)
3. All India Trinamool Congress (2) (11.8%)

Baduria Assembly constituency is an assembly constituency in North 24 Parganas district in the Indian state of West Bengal.

== Overview ==
As per orders of the Delimitation Commission, No. 99 Baduria Assembly constituency is composed of the following: Baduria municipality, and Aturia, Bagjola, Bajitpur, Chandipur, Chhatra, South Jadurhati, North Jadurhati, Jagannathpur, Jasikati Atghara, Nayabastia Milani, Raghunathpur and Sayesta Nagar II gram panchayats of Baduria community development block.

Baduria Assembly constituency is part of No. 18 Basirhat (Lok Sabha constituency).

== Members of the Legislative Assembly ==
Election	Member	Party
1957	Muhammad Ziaul Haque	Indian National Congress
1962	Muhammad Ziaul Haque	Indian National Congress
1967	Quazi Abdul Gaffar	Indian National Congress
1969	Mir Abdus Sayeed	Communist Party of India (Marxist)
1971	Quazi Abdul Gaffar	Indian National Congress
1972	Quazi Abdul Gaffar	Indian National Congress
1977	Mustafa Bin Quasem	Communist Party of India (Marxist)
1982	Abdul Gaffar Kazi	Indian National Congress
1987	Mohammad Shelim	Communist Party of India (Marxist)
1991	Abdul Gaffar Kazi	Indian National Congress
1996	Abdul Gaffar Kazi	Indian National Congress
2001	Abdul Gaffar Kazi	Indian National Congress
2006	Mohammad Shelim	Communist Party of India (Marxist)
2011	Abdul Ghaffar Quazi	Indian National Congress
2016	Abdur Rahim Quazi	Indian National Congress
2021	Abdur Rahim Quazi	Trinamool Congress
2026	Burhanul Mukaddim	Trinamool Congress

== Election results ==
Vote share of Winning candidates
2026	45.45%
2021	51.53%
2016	50.17%
2011	53.17%
2006	45.62%
2001	51.26%
1996	47.84%
1991	43.08%
1987	46.82%
1982	51.28%
1977	52.84%
1972	64.29%
1971	51.40%
1969	54.95%
1967	37.38%
1962	52.68%
1957	57.53%

=== 2026 ===
2026 West Bengal Legislative Assembly election: Baduria
Party	Candidate	Votes	%	±%
AITC	Burhanul Mukaddim	103,334	45.45	
BJP	Sukriti Kumar Sarkar	63,273	27.83	
Indian Secular Front	Md. Kutubuddin Fatehe	49,700	21.86	
INC	Abdur Rahim Quazi	3,651	1.61	
NOTA	None of the Above	1,387	0.61	
IND	Bedora Bibi	1,211	0.53	
IND	Qutubuddin Ahmed	1,176	0.52	
IND	Abdul Hannan Sardar	835	0.37	
IND	Souptik Mondal	652	0.29	
BSP	Gopal Das	558	0.25	
AJUP	Ibrahim Molla	530	0.23	
IND	Ali Arshaf	481	0.21	
SUCI(C)	Nitaikrishna Pal	321	0.14	
VINPA	Safikul Islam Dafadar	256	0.11	
Majority		40,061	17.62	
Turnout		227,365	96.10	
AITC hold		Swing		

=== 2021 ===
2021 West Bengal Legislative Assembly election: Baduria
Party	Candidate	Votes	%	±%
AITC	Abdur Rahim Quazi	109,701	51.53	
BJP	Sukalyan Baidya	53,257	25.02	
INC	Abdus Sattar	45,231	21.25	
NOTA	None of the Above	1,953	0.92	
BSP	Gopal Das	1,278	0.60	
IND	Safikul Islam Dafadar	844	0.40	
SUCI(C)	Nitai Krishna Pal	619	0.29	
Majority		56,444	26.51	
Turnout		212,883	87.34	
Swing to AITC from INC		Swing		

=== 2016 ===
2016 West Bengal Legislative Assembly election: Baduria
Party	Candidate	Votes	%	±%
INC	Abdur Rahim Quazi	98,408	50.17	
AITC	Amir Ali	76,163	38.83	
BJP	Debika Mukherjee	17,629	8.99	
NOTA	None of the Above	1,654	0.84	
BSP	Gopal Das	1,166	0.59	
SUCI(C)	Nurul Amin Mondal	1,130	0.58	
Majority		22,245	11.34	
Turnout		196,150	87.75	
INC hold		Swing		

=== 2011 ===
2011 West Bengal Legislative Assembly election: Baduria
Party	Candidate	Votes	%	±%
INC	Abdul Gaffar Quazi	89,952	53.17	
CPI(M)	Md. Shelim Gain	66,992	39.60	
BJP	Sukumar Dey	6,616	3.91	
IND	Alauddin Amed	2,872	1.70	
BSP	Gopal Das	1,469	0.87	
SUCI(C)	Nurul Amin Mondal	1,278	0.76	
Majority		22,960	13.57	
Turnout		169,179	89.77	
Swing to INC from CPI(M)		Swing		

=== 2006 ===
2006 West Bengal Legislative Assembly election: Baduria
Party	Candidate	Votes	%	±%
CPI(M)	Md. Shelim Gain	63,456	45.62	
INC	Abdul Gaffar Kazi	63,289	45.50	
AITC	Sudhansu Mondal	8,361	6.01	
SP	Waliur Rahaman	2,523	1.81	
BSP	Gopal Das	1,455	1.05	
Majority		167	0.12	
Turnout		139,084		
Swing to CPI(M) from INC		Swing		

=== 2001 ===
2001 West Bengal Legislative Assembly election: Baduria
Party	Candidate	Votes	%	±%
INC	Qazi Abdul Gaffar	63,277	51.26	
CPI(M)	Sambhu Biswas	52,521	42.55	
BJP	Azizur Rahaman	5,102	4.13	
INL	Shah Alam	2,544	2.06	
Majority		10,756	8.71	
Turnout		123,470	82.12	
INC hold		Swing		

=== 1996 ===
1996 West Bengal Legislative Assembly election: Baduria
Party	Candidate	Votes	%	±%
INC	Quazi Abdul Guffar	58,967	47.84	
CPI(M)	Md. Shelim	53,664	43.54	
BJP	Pallab Chaudhuri	9,121	7.40	
IND	Akhil Chakraborty	570	0.46	
INL	Safikul Sohaji	512	0.42	
AMB	Dipak Kumar Sarkar	217	0.18	
IND	Md. Asraff Ali	208	0.17	
Majority		5,303	4.30	
Turnout		124,545	90.11	
INC hold		Swing		

=== 1991 ===
1991 West Bengal Legislative Assembly election: Baduria
Party	Candidate	Votes	%	±%
INC	Quazi Abdul Gaffar	46,179	43.08	
CPI(M)	Mohammad Shelim	42,840	39.96	
BJP	Ranajit Das	16,717	15.59	
JP	Asraf Ali	401	0.37	
IUML	Azizar	333	0.31	
AMB	Dipak Kumar Sarkar	305	0.28	
IND	Arun Ghosh	267	0.25	
IND	Siddiqui Hedayet Ulah	161	0.15	
Majority		3,339	3.12	
Turnout		108,928	85.64	
Swing to INC from CPI(M)		Swing		

=== 1987 ===
1987 West Bengal Legislative Assembly election: Baduria
Party	Candidate	Votes	%	±%
CPI(M)	Md. Shelim	43,102	46.82	
INC	Quazi Abdul Gaffar	41,677	45.27	
IUML	Md. Abibur Rahaman	5,738	6.23	
IND	Rasdha Raman Mondal	884	0.96	
IND	Arun Ghosh	364	0.40	
IND	Dipak Kumar Sarkar	290	0.32	
Majority		1,425	1.55	
Turnout		93,035	83.50	
Swing to CPI(M) from INC		Swing		

=== 1982 ===
1982 West Bengal Legislative Assembly election: Baduria
Party	Candidate	Votes	%	±%
INC	Quazi Abdul Gaffar	42,123	51.28	
CPI(M)	Mostafa Bin Quasem	39,286	47.82	
IND	Nibir Kumar Halder	742	0.90	
Majority		2,837	3.46	
Turnout		83,205	87.25	
Swing to INC from CPI(M)		Swing		

=== 1977 ===
1977 West Bengal Legislative Assembly election: Baduria
Party	Candidate	Votes	%	±%
CPI(M)	Mostafa Bin Quasem	25,756	52.84	
INC	Zulfiquer Ali	14,003	28.73	
JP	Azizur Rahman	8,628	17.70	
IUML	Molla Mohd. Yunus	356	0.73	
Majority		11,753	24.11	
Turnout		49,355	57.21	
Swing to CPI(M) from INC		Swing		

=== 1972 ===
1972 West Bengal Legislative Assembly election: Baduria
Party	Candidate	Votes	%	±%
INC	Quazi Abdul Gaffar	31,320	64.29	
CPI(M)	Mir Abdul Sayed	17,399	35.71	
Majority		13,921	28.58	
Turnout		49,460	66.44	
INC hold		Swing		

=== 1971 ===
1971 West Bengal Legislative Assembly election: Baduria
Party	Candidate	Votes	%	±%
INC	Ghazi Abdul Gaffar	23,117	51.40	
CPI(M)	Shrikh Ali Ahmad	13,163	29.27	
IND	Molla Nasirulla Haque	3,543	7.88	
CPI	Aktarul Haque Khan	3,199	7.11	
INC(O)	Harendra Nath Roy	1,607	3.57	
BAC	Harendra Mukherjee	342	0.76	
Majority		9,954	22.13	
Turnout		46,728	63.28	
Swing to INC from CPI(M)		Swing		

=== 1969 ===
1969 West Bengal Legislative Assembly election: Baduria
Party	Candidate	Votes	%	±%
CPI(M)	Mir Abdus Sayeed	29,718	54.95	
INC	Quazi Abdul Gaffar	22,103	40.87	
PML	Chisty Indad Hissain	1,507	2.79	
LKD	Sachinadan Baidya	591	1.09	
NDF	Md. Abdul Salam	163	0.30	
Majority		7,615	14.08	
Turnout		54,955	76.12	
Swing to CPI(M) from INC		Swing		

=== 1967 ===
1967 West Bengal Legislative Assembly election: Baduria
Party	Candidate	Votes	%	±%
INC	Quazi Abdul Gaffar	19,824	37.38	
CPI(M)	M. Sayeed	17,820	33.60	
BAC	K. M. Das	15,395	29.03	
Majority		2,004	3.78	
Turnout		55,511	78.27	
INC hold		Swing		

=== 1962 ===
1962 West Bengal Legislative Assembly election: Baduria
Party	Candidate	Votes	%	±%
INC	Md. Ziaul Haque	24,205	52.68	
CPI	Mir Abdus Sayeed	20,146	43.85	
ABJS	Kshitindra Nath Choudhury	1,023	2.23	
IND	Abdul Latif	572	1.24	
Majority		4,059	8.83	
Turnout		48,001	63.49	
INC hold		Swing		

=== 1957 ===
1957 West Bengal Legislative Assembly election: Baduria
Party	Candidate	Votes	%	±%
INC	Md. Zia Ul Haque	24,088	57.53	
CPI	Gopen Gaine	12,601	30.09	
IND	Nando Lal Sarkhel	3,374	8.06	
IND	Kased Ali	1,808	4.32	
Majority		11,487	27.44	
Turnout		41,871	63.32	
INC win (new seat)				
