= Baduria (community development block) =

- Community development block
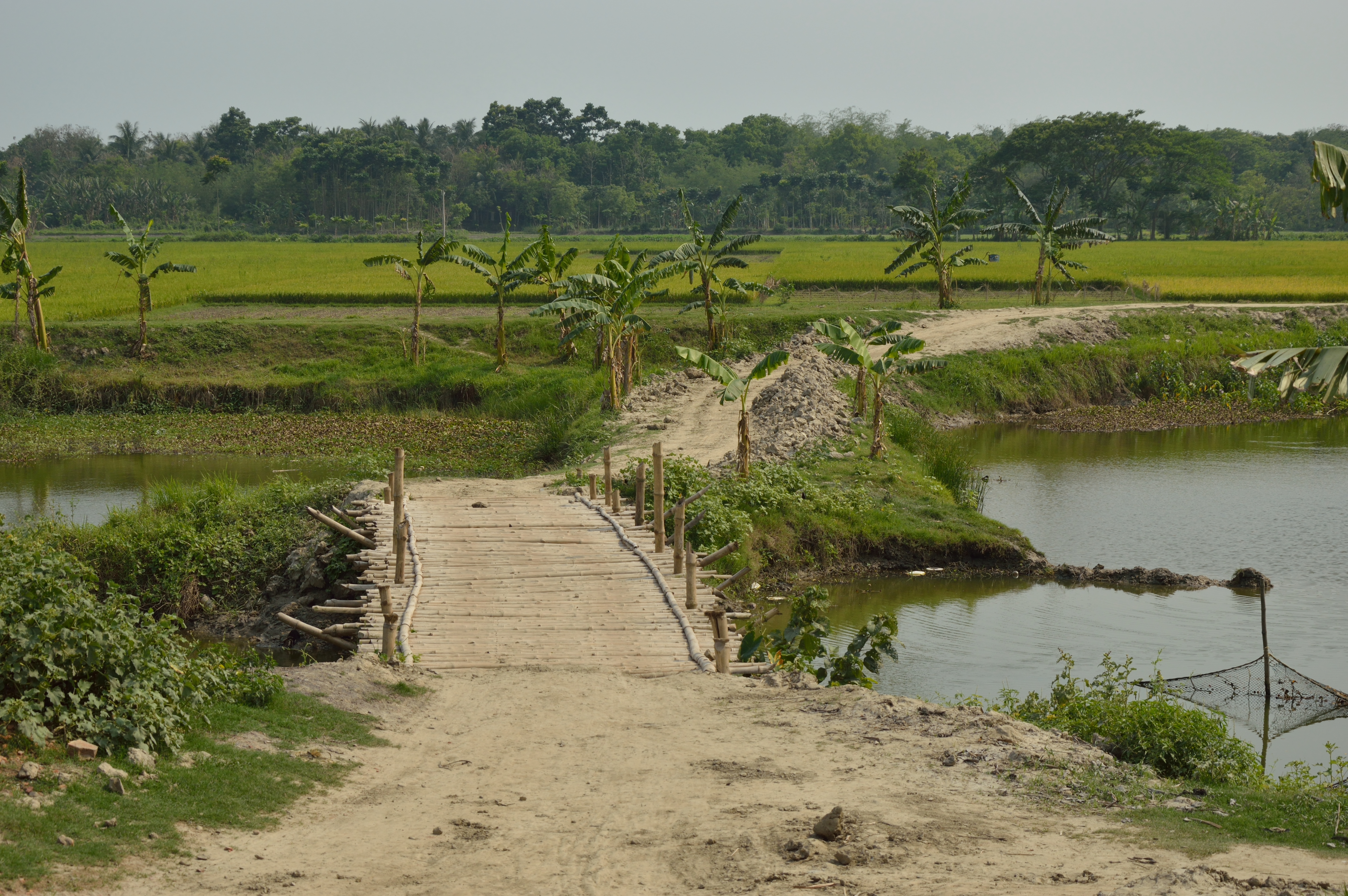
- Bamboo bridge across the Ichhamati

- Coordinates: 22.6979708°N 88.7803459°E
- Country: India
- State: West Bengal
- District: North 24 Parganas

Government
  - Type: Representative democracy

Area
  - Total: 179.72 km^{2} (69.39 sq mi)

Population (2011)
  - Total: 285,319
  - Density: 1,587.6/km^{2} (4,111.8/sq mi)

Languages
  - Official: Bengali, English

Literacy (2011)
  - Total literates: 199,549 (78.75%)
- Time zone: UTC+5:30 (IST)
- PIN: 743401 (Baduria); 743247 (Dakshin Chatra)
- Telephone/STD code: 03217
- ISO 3166 code: IN-WB
- Vehicle registration: WB-23, WB-24, WB-25, WB-26
- Lok Sabha constituency: Basirhat
- Vidhan Sabha constituency: Baduria
- Website: north24parganas.nic.in

Baduria is a community development block that forms an administrative division in Basirhat subdivision of North 24 Parganas district in the Indian state of West Bengal.

== Geography ==
Bajitpur, a constituent panchayat in Baduria block, is located at 22°41′53″N 88°46′49″E.

Baduria CD Block is bounded by Swarupnagar CD Block in the north and east. A small portion of its boundary borders Satkhira Sadar Upazila in Satkhira District of Bangladesh in the east. Basirhat I and Basirhat II CD Blocks are in the south, Deganga and Habra I CD Blocks are in west. While Gobardanga municipality is in the north, Baduria and Basirhat municipalities are in the south.

Baduria CD Block is part of the Ichhamati-Raimangal Plain, one of the three physiographic regions in the district located in the lower Ganges Delta. It contains soil of mature black or brownish loam to recent alluvium. The Ichhamati flows through the eastern part of the district. The Ichhamati flows through the CD Block.

Baduria CD Block has an area of 179.72 km^{2}. It has 1 panchayat samity, 14 gram panchayats, 171 gram sansads (village councils), 97 mouzas and 97 inhabited villages, as per District Statistical Handbook: North 24 Parganas. Baduria police station serves this block. Headquarters of this CD Block is at Iswarigachha.

Gram panchayats of Baduria block/ panchayat samiti are: Aturia, Chatra, Jadurhati Uttar, Sayestanagar II, Bagjola, Jagannathpur, Raghunathpur, Jadurhati Dakshin, Bajitpur, Jasikati Atghara, Ramchandrapur Uday, Chandipur, Nayabastia Milani and Sayestanagar I.

== Demographics ==
=== Population ===
As per 2011 Census of India Baduria CD Block had a total population of 285,319, of which 278,044 were rural and 7,275 were urban. There were 145,641 (51%) males and 139,678 (49%) females. Population below 6 years was 31,920. Scheduled Castes numbered 46,811 (16.41%) and Scheduled Tribes numbered 2,423 (0.85%).

As per 2001 census, Baduria block has a total population of 247,592 out of which 125,290 were males and 121,302 were females.

There is only one census town in Baduria CD Block (2011 census figure in brackets) : Dakshin Chatra (7,275).

Large villages in Baduria CD Block (2011 census figures in brackets): Ghoshpur (7,036), Salua (4,237), Chandipur (11,021), Bagjola (4,134), Bena (5,702), Ramchandrapur (5,650), Kankrasuti (5,345), Atghara (5,250), Haidarpur (4,098), Shimla Durgapur (7,225), Jashaikati (7,317), Narayanpur (4,116), Jangalpur (4,917), Serpur (4,874), Jadurhati Khaspur (4,016), Gokna (4,455), Maleapur (4,318), Fatullapur (4,589), Punra (P) (8,590), Gandharbbapur (5,038), Piyara (4,957), Katia (6,450), Aturia (7,182) and Sayestanagar (7,014).

North 24 Parganas district is densely populated, mainly because of the influx of refugees from East Pakistan (later Bangladesh). With a density of population of 2,182 per km^{2} in 1971, it was 3rd in terms of density per km^{2} in West Bengal after Kolkata and Howrah, and 20th in India. According to the District Human Development Report: North 24 Parganas, "High density is also explained partly by the rapid growth of urbanization in the district. In 1991, the percentage of urban population in the district has been 51.23."

Decadal Population Growth Rate (%)

The decadal growth of population in Baduria CD Block in 2001-2011 was 15.22%. The decadal growth of population in Baduria CD Block in 1991-2001 was 17.17%.

The decadal growth rate of population in North 24 Parganas district was as follows: 47.9% in 1951-61, 34.5% in 1961-71, 31.4% in 1971-81, 31.7% in 1981-91, 22.7% in 1991-2001 and 12.0% in 2001-11. The decadal growth rate for West Bengal in 2001-11 was 13.93%. The decadal growth rate for West Bengal was 17.84% in 1991-2001, 24.73% in 1981-1991 and 23.17% in 1971-1981.

Only a small portion of the border with Bangladesh has been fenced and it is popularly referred to as a porous border. It is freely used by Bangladeshi infiltrators, terrorists, smugglers, criminals et al.

=== Literacy ===
As per the 2011 census, the total number of literates in Baduria CD Block was 199,549 (78.75% of the population over 6 years) out of which males numbered 106,245 (82.13% of the male population over 6 years) and females numbered 93,304 (75.22% of the female population over 6 years). The gender disparity (the difference between female and male literacy rates) was 6.90%.

See also – List of West Bengal districts ranked by literacy rate

Literacy in CD blocks of
North 24 Parganas district
Barasat Sadar subdivision
Amdanga – 80.69%
Deganga – 79.65%
Barasat I – 81.50%
Barasat II – 77.71%
Habra I – 83.15%
Habra II – 81.05%
Rajarhat – 83.13%
Basirhat subdivision
Baduria – 78.75%
Basirhat I – 72.10%
Basirhat II – 78.30%
Haroa – 73.13%
Hasnabad – 71.47%
Hingalganj – 76.85%
Minakhan – 71.33%
Sandeshkhali I – 71.08%
Sandeshkhali II – 70.96%
Swarupnagar – 77.57%
Bangaon subdivision
Bagdah – 75.30%
Bangaon – 79.71%
Gaighata – 82.32%
Barrackpore subdivision
Barrackpore I – 85.91%
Barrackpore II – 84.53%
Source: 2011 Census: CD Block Wise
Primary Census Abstract Data

=== Language and religion ===
Religion in Baduria CD block (2011)
Islam	65.48%
Hinduism	34.35%
Other or not stated	0.17%

In the 2011 census Muslims numbered 186,836 and formed 65.48% of the population in Baduria CD Block. Hindus numbered 98,010 and formed 34.35% of the population. Others numbered 473 and formed 0.17% of the population.

In 1981 Muslims numbered 95,202 and formed 60.08% of the population and Hindus numbered 63,263 and formed 39.90% of the population. In 1991 Muslims numbered 130,634 and formed 61.81% of the population and Hindus numbered 80,693 and formed 38.18% of the population in Baduria CD Block. (In 1981 and 1991 census was conducted as per jurisdiction of the police station). In 2001 in Baduria CD block Muslims were 157,906 (63.76%) and Hindus 89,540 (36.16%)

Bengali is the predominant language, spoken by 99.67% of the population.

== Rural Poverty ==
40.74% of households in Baduria CD Block lived below poverty line in 2001, against an average of 29.28% in North 24 Parganas district.

== Economy ==
=== Livelihood ===
Livelihood
in Baduria CD Block
1. Cultivators (17.4%)
2. Agricultural labourers (31.5%)
3. Household industries (6.70%)
4. Other Workers (44.4%)

In Baduria CD Block in 2011, amongst the class of total workers, cultivators numbered 18,840 and formed 17.40% of the total workers, agricultural labourers numbered 34,088 and formed 31.47%, household industry workers numbered 7,261 and formed 6.70% and other workers numbered 48,116 and formed 44.43%. Total workers numbered 108,305 and formed 37.96% of the total population, and non-workers numbered 177,014 and formed 62.04% of the population.

In more than 30 percent of the villages in North 24 Parganas, agriculture or household industry is no longer the major source of livelihood for the main workers there. The CD Blocks in the district can be classified as belonging to three categories: border areas, Sundarbans area and other rural areas. The percentage of other workers in the other rural areas category is considerably higher than those in the border areas and Sundarbans area.

Note: In the census records a person is considered a cultivator, if the person is engaged in cultivation/ supervision of land owned by self/government/institution. When a person who works on another person's land for wages in cash or kind or share, is regarded as an agricultural labourer. Household industry is defined as an industry conducted by one or more members of the family within the household or village, and one that does not qualify for registration as a factory under the Factories Act. Other workers are persons engaged in some economic activity other than cultivators, agricultural labourers and household workers. It includes factory, mining, plantation, transport and office workers, those engaged in business and commerce, teachers, entertainment artistes and so on.

=== Infrastructure ===
There are 96 inhabited villages in Baduria CD Block, as per District Census Handbook: North 24 Parganas. 100% villages have power supply and drinking water supply. 26 villages (27.08%) have post offices. 92 villages (95.83%) have telephones (including landlines, public call offices and mobile phones). 69 villages (67.79%) have a pucca approach road and 42 villages (43.75%) have transport communication (includes bus service, rail facility and navigable waterways). 13 villages (13.54%) have agricultural credit societies and 7 villages (7.29% ) have banks.

=== Agriculture ===
The North 24 Parganas district Human Development Report opines that in spite of agricultural productivity in North 24 Parganas district being rather impressive 81.84% of rural population suffered from shortage of food. With a high urbanisation of 54.3% in 2001, the land use pattern in the district is changing quite fast and the area under cultivation is declining. However, agriculture is still the major source of livelihood in the rural areas of the district.

From 1977 on wards major land reforms took place in West Bengal. Land in excess of land ceiling was acquired and distributed amongst the peasants. Following land reforms land ownership pattern has undergone transformation. In 2010-11, persons engaged in agriculture in Baduria CD Block could be classified as follows: bargadars 1,597 (3.04%), patta (document) holders 5,084 (9.69%), small farmers (possessing land between 1 and 2 hectares) 2,305 (4.39%), marginal farmers (possessing land up to 1 hectare) 22,075 (42.07%) and agricultural labourers 21,416 (40.81%).

Baduria CD Block had 192 fertiliser depots, 91 seed stores and 4 fair price shops in 2010-11.

In 2010-11, Baduria CD Block produced 18,912 tonnes of Aman paddy, the main winter crop from 7,011 hectares, 14,664 tonnes of Boro paddy (spring crop) from 4,461 hectares, 2,459 tonnes of Aus paddy (summer crop) from 927 hectares, 950 tonnes of wheat from 331 hectares, 93,536 tonnes of jute from 4,949 hectares, and 76,770 tonnes of potatoes from 2,062 hectares. It also produced pulses and oilseeds.

In 2010-11, the total area irrigated in Baduria CD Block was 390 hectares, of which 20 hectares were irrigated by river lift irrigation, 326 hectares by deep tube well and 44 hectares by shallow tube well.

=== Pisciculture ===
In 2010-11, the net area under effective pisciculture in Baduria CD Block was 4,279.33 hectares. 27,805 persons were engaged in the profession. Approximate annual production was 128,379.9 quintals.

=== Banking ===
In 2010-11, Baduria CD Block had offices of 13 commercial banks and 2 gramin banks.

== Transport ==
In 2010-11, Baduria CD Block had 7 ferry services and 1 originating/ terminating bus route. The nearest railway station is 16 km from CD Block headquarters.

Local roads link this CD Block to Habra, Deganga and Basirhat.

== Education ==
In 2010-11, Baduria CD Block had 134 primary schools with 12,249 students, 3 middle schools with 1,038 students, 16 high schools with 10,930 students and 13 higher secondary schools with 16,005 students. Baduria CD Block and Baduria municipal area together had 470 institutions for special and non-formal education with 19,590 students.

As per the 2011 census, in Baduria CD Block, amongst the 96 inhabited villages, 4 villages did not have a school, 55 villages had more than 1 primary school, 44 villages had at least 1 primary and 1 middle school and 24 villages had at least 1 middle and 1 secondary school.

== Healthcare ==
In 2011, Baduria CD Block had 1 rural hospital and 4 primary health centres, with total 98 beds and 12 doctors (excluding private bodies). It had 35 family welfare subcentres. 6,163 patients were treated indoors and 145,973 patients were treated outdoor in the hospitals, health centres and subcentres of the CD Block.

Rudrapur (Baduria) Rural Hospital at Rudrapur with 60 beds functions as the main medical facility in Baduria CD Block. There are primary health centres at Dakshin Chatra (with 6 beds), Jadurhati (with 6 beds), and Model Belghoria (Bajitpur PHC with 10 beds).

Baduria block is one of the areas where ground water is affected by arsenic contamination.
