= Indian National Democratic Front =

Political party in India

Indian National Democratic Front was a political party in West Bengal, India, led by former Congress minister Ashu Ghosh. Ghosh had taken part in the maneuvers to bring down the United Front cabinet in 1967. However, as he did not become a minister in the P.C. Ghosh-led cabinet that replaced the UF, he revolted and formed the INDF. The INDF had the support of 18 members in the legislative assembly. The INDF pledged support from the governor to form a government in the state. After the INDF split, P.C. Ghosh no longer had a majority in the assembly, and on 28 February 1968, President's Rule was declared.

The INDF presented 97 candidates in 1969 assembly election. One only, Abdul Karim Choudhury in the Chopra constituency, was able to win a seat. In total the INDF got 118650 votes.
