= Narikelbaria =

- Location in Bangladesh
- Coordinates: 22°34′N 90°5′E
- Country: Bangladesh
- Division: Barisal Division
- District: Pirojpur District
- Time zone: UTC+6 (Bangladesh Time)

Narikelbaria is a village in Pirojpur District in the Barisal Division of southwestern Bangladesh.
